= 2025 Boston Red Sox season =

2025 Boston Red Sox
- American League Wild Card
- League: American League
- Division: East
- Ballpark: Fenway Park
- City: Boston, Massachusetts
- Record: 89–73 (.549)
- Divisional place: 3rd
- Owners: John W. Henry (Fenway Sports Group)
- President: Sam Kennedy
- Chief baseball officer: Craig Breslow
- Manager: Alex Cora
- Television: NESN: Dave O’Brien or Mike Monaco (play-by-play); Lou Merloni, Will Middlebrooks, Kevin Millar (analyst rotation); Jahmai Webster (in-game reporter); Tom Caron or Adam Pellerin (hosts); Jim Rice, Jonathan Papelbon, Lenny DiNardo, Alanna Rizzo, Deven Marrero (studio analyst)
- Radio: WEEI-FM / Boston Red Sox Radio Network: Will Flemming; (Note: Longtime Red Sox radio announcer Joe Castiglione retired at the end of the 2024 regular season.) Sean McDonough, Mike Monaco, Lou Merloni, Will Middlebrooks (rotation)

The 2025 Boston Red Sox season was the 125th season in Boston Red Sox franchise history, and their 114th season at Fenway Park. Alex Cora was the team's on-field manager, in the fifth season of his second stint in that role. The team opened the regular season in an away game against the Texas Rangers on March 27, and concluded at home against the Detroit Tigers on September 28.

On June 15, the Red Sox traded third baseman/designated hitter Rafael Devers to the San Francisco Giants. Devers was the last remaining player from the 2018 World Series-winning roster.

The Red Sox clinched their first postseason berth since 2021 on September 26, as they faced their longtime rivals, the New York Yankees, in the Wild Card Series. However, they were defeated by the Yankees in three games - their first postseason series loss against the Yankees since the 2003 ALCS.

The Boston Red Sox drew an average home attendance of 34,277, the 10th-highest of all MLB teams.

== Offseason ==
In September 2024, the team announced the introduction of the "City Connect 2.0" uniform for the 2025 season. The team retained its existing City Connect uniform (yellow and blue) while retiring their blue alternate road jersey that had been in use since 2009. By late November 2024, the team had 10 players under contract for the upcoming 2025 season: Brayan Bello, Rafael Devers, Lucas Giolito, Liam Hendriks, Ceddanne Rafaela, Rob Refsnyder, Trevor Story, Garrett Whitlock, Justin Wilson, and Masataka Yoshida.

October–December 2024

October–December 2024 Roster moves
Date	Roster move	Ref.
October 1	The team recalled Zack Kelly, Cam Booser, Zach Penrod, Bailey Horn, Cooper Criswell from Worcester; as well as Luis Perales and Wikelman Gonzalez from Portland. The team activated Rob Refsnyder, Rafael Devers, and David Hamilton from the 10-day injured list; as well as Kenley Jansen and Brennan Bernardino from the 15 day-injured list. Reese McGuire and Yohan Ramírez, not on the 40-man roster, elected free agency.	
October 9	It was reported that the team dismissed six members of the coaching staff—Ben Chadwick (trainer), Andy Fox (first base/infield coach), Rey Fuentes (mental skills coach), Mani Martinez (bullpen catcher), Luis Ortiz (assistant hitting coach), and Kevin Walker (bullpen coach).	
October 27	The team named Dillon Lawson assistant hitting coach.	
October 31	Eight players elected to become free agents: pitchers Luis García, Kenley Jansen, Chris Martin, James Paxton, Nick Pivetta, and Lucas Sims along with catcher Danny Jansen and outfielder Tyler O'Neill. Pitcher Lucas Giolito exercised his option to remain with the team for the 2025 season.	
November 4	The team activated players still remaining on the 60-day injured list from the 2024 season, bringing the number of players on their 40-man roster to 39, and exercised their $2.1 million club option to bring Rob Refsnyder back for 2025.	
November 5	The team declined a qualifying offer for Tyler O'Neill for $21.05 million, making him a free agent.	
November 13	The team hired Chris Holt to serve as bullpen coach.	
November 14	The team signed free-agent pitcher Justin Wilson to a one-year contract.	
November 19	Nick Pivetta declined the team's qualifying offer for 2025 and elected free agency, and in advance of the Rule 5 draft, the team added pitcher Hunter Dobbins and outfielder Jhostynxon Garcia to the 40-man roster; pitchers Isaiah Campbell and Bryan Mata were designated for assignment.	
November 22	The team named José David Flores as first-base coach and Parker Guinn as catching instructor/bullpen catcher.	
December 10	The team signed free-agent pitcher Aroldis Chapman to a one-year contract.	
December 11	The team acquired pitcher Garrett Crochet from the Chicago White Sox in exchange for minor-league prospects Kyle Teel, Braden Montgomery, Chase Meidroth and Wikelman González, acquired catcher Carlos Narváez from the New York Yankees in exchange for minor-league pitcher Elmer Rodriguez-Cruz and international signing bonus pool money, and designated Enmanuel Valdez for assignment.	
December 13	The team signed free agent pitcher Robert Moreno to the minor-league contract.	
December 15	The team acquired minor league pitcher Joe Vogatsky from the Pittsburgh Pirates in exchange for infielder/outfielder Enmanuel Valdez.	
December 20	The team invited non-roster pitchers Isaiah Campbell, Wyatt Mills, Michael Fulmer and Bryan Mata to spring training. The team also invited right-fielder Nate Eaton and catcher Seby Zavala.	
December 21	The team acquired minor league pitcher Yhoiker Fajardo from the Chicago White Sox in exchange for pitcher Cam Booser. They also agreed to a minor league contract with Noah Davis.	
December 23	The team signed free-agent pitcher Patrick Sandoval to a two-year contract.	
December 24	The team traded catcher Mickey Gasper to the Minnesota Twins in exchange for pitcher Jovani Morán.	
December 27	Ceddanne Rafaela, David Hamilton, and Nick Sogard changed their numbers to 3, 17, and 20 respectively.	
December 28	The team signed free agent pitcher Walker Buehler to a one-year contract, later reported to be worth $21.05 million with a $3.05 million signing bonus, $15 million base salary, and a mutual option for 2026 with a $3 million buyout.	

January–March 2025

January–March 2025 Roster moves
Date	Roster move	Ref.
January 9	The team avoid arbitration with pitchers Garrett Crochet, Tanner Houck, and Kutter Crawford, each agreeing to one-year deals, while they could not reach an agreement with outfielder Jarren Duran.	
January 14	The team signed free agent pitcher Sean Newcomb to a minor-league contract and invited him to spring training.	
January 15	The team acquired catcher Blake Sabol from the Giants in exchange for international bonus pool space. To make space for Sabol on the 40 man roster, Chase Shugart was designated for assignment. The team also signed multiple free agents to minor league contracts, and invited Robert Stock and Yovanny Cruz to spring training.	
January 17	The team avoided arbitration with outfielder Jarren Duran by signing him to a one-year contract with a club option for 2026, and traded pitcher Chase Shugart to the Pittsburgh Pirates in exchange for minor-league pitcher Matt McShane.	
January 24	The team signed catcher Mark Kolozsvary to a minor-league contract with an invitation to spring training.	
January 28	The team signed infielder Abraham Toro to a minor-league contract. They invited Toro, along with Nathan Hickey, Roman Anthony, Kristian Campbell, Jacob Webb, Brian Van Belle, Marcelo Mayer, and Jovani Morán, to spring training.	
February 15	The team signed free agent third baseman Alex Bregman. To create space on the roster, Patrick Sandoval was moved to the 60-day injured list.	
February 17	The team signed Trayce Thompson to a minor-league contract with an invitation to spring training.	
February 18	The team signed Adam Ottavino to a minor-league contract with an invitation to spring training.	
February 19	The team signed Matt Moore to a minor-league contract.	
February 21	Multiple minor-league players were assigned to the Red Sox team.	
February 22	Minor-league players Jose Adames, Shane Drohan and Gabriel Jackson were assigned to the Red Sox.	
March 23	The team released Adam Ottavino from his contract.	

== Spring training ==
Spring Training non-roster invitees

Player	Position	2024 team(s)	Source
Isaiah Campbell	Pitcher	Worcester Red Sox (AAA)	
Yovanny Cruz	Pitcher	San Antonio Missions (AA)	
Michael Fulmer	Pitcher	Worcester Red Sox (AAA)	
Bryan Mata	Pitcher	FCL Red Sox (Rookie) / Greenville Drive (High A) / Portland Sea Dogs (AA) / Worcester Red Sox (AAA)	
Wyatt Mills	Pitcher	—	
Matt Moore	Pitcher	Los Angeles Angels	
Jovani Morán	Pitcher	—	
Sean Newcomb	Pitcher	ACL Athletics (Rookie) / Las Vegas Aviators (AAA) / Oakland Athletics	
Adam Ottavino	Pitcher	New York Mets	
Robert Stock	Pitcher	—	
Brian Van Belle	Pitcher	Worcester Red Sox (AAA)	
Jacob Webb	Pitcher	Baltimore Orioles / Norfolk Tides (AAA) / Bowie Baysox (AA)	
Nathan Hickey	Catcher	Worcester Red Sox (AAA) / Portland Sea Dogs (AA)	
Mark Kolozsvary	Catcher	Worcester Red Sox (AAA)	
Seby Zavala	Catcher	Seattle Mariners / Tacoma Rainiers (AAA)	
Nate Eaton	Infielder	Omaha Storm Chasers (AAA)	
Abraham Toro	Infielder	Oakland Athletics / ACL Athletics (Rookie) / Las Vegas Aviators (AAA)	
Roman Anthony	Outfielder	Portland Sea Dogs (AA) / Worcester Red Sox (AAA)	
Kristian Campbell	Outfielder	Greenville Drive (High A) / Portland Sea Dogs (AA) / Worcester Red Sox (AAA)	
Marcelo Mayer	Outfielder	Portland Sea Dogs (AA)	
Trayce Thompson	Outfielder	Syracuse Mets (AAA) / Iowa Cubs (AAA)	

The team's equipment departed Fenway Park on February 3, known as "Truck Day", in preparation for their arrival in Fort Myers, Florida to begin Spring Training.

The first workout for the pitchers and catchers was held on February 12 at Fenway South, and their first full-squad workout took place on February 17, with the pitchers and catchers set to be joined by six infielders, six outfielders, and six infielder/outfielders for a total of 60 players, including 20 non-roster invitees. On February 19, pitcher Matt Moore was signed to a minor league contract, and invited to join the team for Spring Training on February 23.

The Red Sox' first spring training game was an exhibition contest against the Northeastern Huskies at Fenway South on February 21, which ended in a 5–2 victory for the team. The team's Grapefruit League schedule ran from February 22 through March 23, during which the Red Sox compiled a 15–12 record.

They concluded spring training with two games in Monterrey, Mexico against the Monterrey Sultanes on March 24–25, and won both games by 10–1 and 12–8 respectively.

== Regular season ==
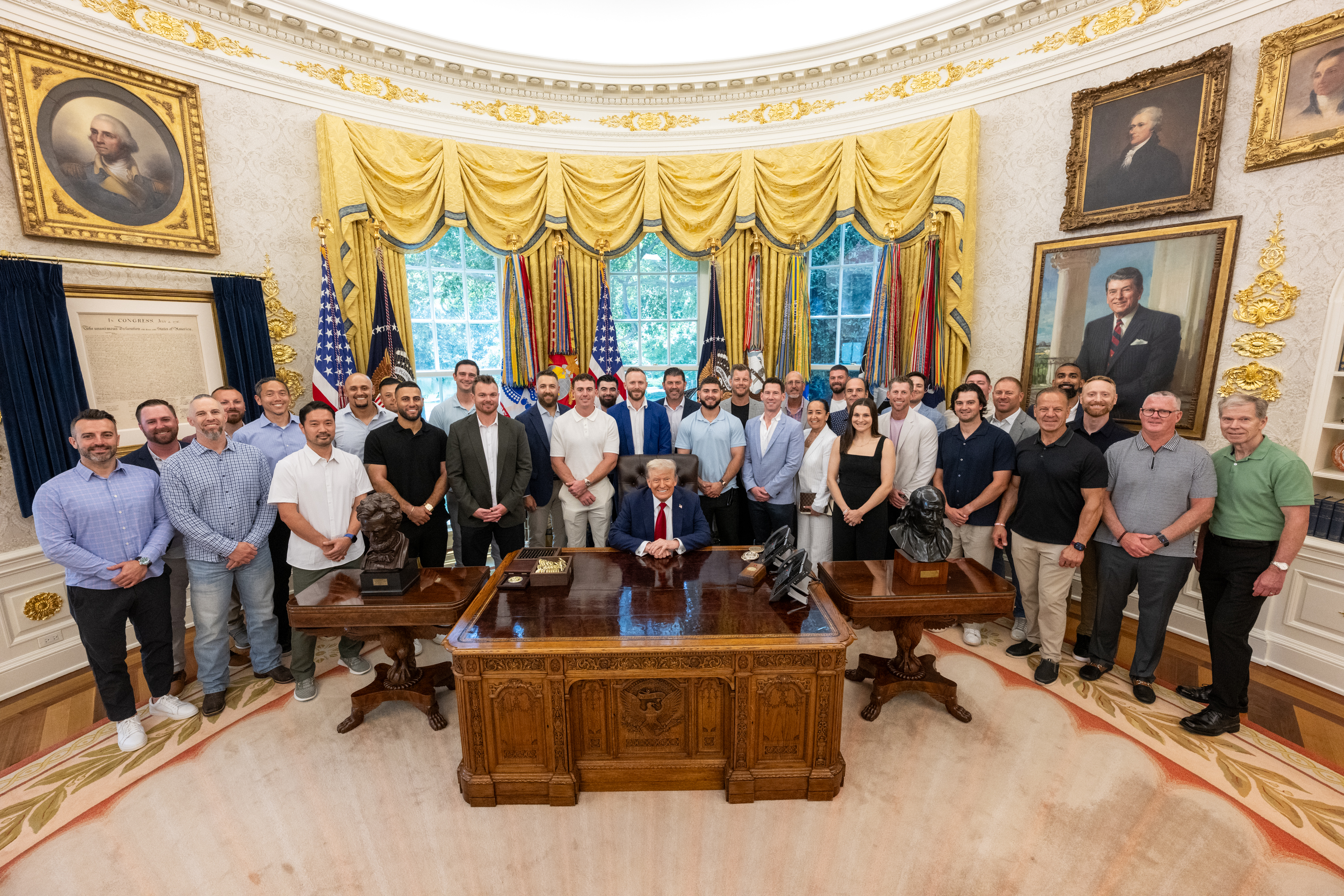
Members of the Boston Red Sox with the US president in the Oval Office on July 3, 2025

=== Opening Day lineup ===
Order	No.	Player	Pos.
1	16	Jarren Duran	LF
2	11	Rafael Devers	DH
3	2	Alex Bregman	3B
4	36	Triston Casas	1B
5	10	Trevor Story	SS
6	28	Kristian Campbell	2B
7	52	Wilyer Abreu	RF
8	12	Connor Wong	C
9	3	Ceddanne Rafaela	CF
—	35	Garrett Crochet	P

On March 26, manager Alex Cora announced that Rafael Devers would move to the designated hitter position while Alex Bregman would become the regular third baseman.

=== March/April ===
March/April game summaries

March 27–30, at Texas Rangers

The Red Sox began the season with a four-game away series against the Texas Rangers. On Opening Day, Wilyer Abreu hit two home runs in Boston's 5–2 victory. In the second game, Tanner Houck gave up four runs to Texas across his 5 2/3 innings start to result in a 1–4 loss. On March 29, although Kristian Campbell hit his first home run in the major leagues, Walker Buehler gave up four runs and issued only three strikeouts in 4 1/3 innings. Texas ultimately won the third game 4–3. Rookie starting pitcher Richard Fitts gave up one run through his first 5 innings in the final game of the series on March 30, before allowing two home runs by the Rangers 6th. The Rangers won the game 3–2 and took the series 3 games to 1.

Series result: Red Sox 1–3 Rangers (11–13 runs)

March 31–April 3, at Baltimore Orioles

On March 31, the Red Sox began a three-game away series against the Baltimore Orioles. Starting pitcher Sean Newcomb gave up four runs, eight hits, and two walks in 4 innings, while reliever Justin Slaten gave up another four runs in the 8th inning for an 8–5 loss. In the second game of the series, Trevor Story hit his first home run of the year, and Garrett Crochet recorded eight strikeouts with only four hits in 8 innings for a final 3–0 score, securing the team's first shutout win of the season. Tanner Houck faced Baltimore's Charlie Morton in the series finale; Houck allowed three runs, five hits, and recorded six strikeouts in 4 innings pitched, followed by reliever Zack Kelly, and Alex Bregman, Triston Casas, and Campbell each recorded home runs to earn Boston an 8–4 victory.

Series result: Red Sox 2–1 Orioles (16–12 runs)

April 4–6, vs. St. Louis Cardinals

The Red Sox held their first home game of the season at Fenway on April 4, in the first of a three-game series against the St. Louis Cardinals. Starting pitcher Walker Buehler recorded five runs and seven hits in 5 innings, followed by four combined runs scored against Zack Kelly and Cooper Criswell. Closer Aroldis Chapman earned a 13–9 win which featured home runs by Trevor Story and Wilyer Abreu. The second game of the series was scheduled to take place the following day, but due to rain delay was postponed into a day-night double-header to take place the day after, on April 6. The makeup game on Sunday afternoon was started by Red Sox pitcher Sean Newcomb and Cardinals pitcher Andre Pallante. Newcomb recorded one run, six hits and four strikeouts across 4 2/3 innings. The Red Sox forced extra innings, and in the bottom of the 10th, Abreu hit a single which brought home ghost runner Alex Bregman to earn the Red Sox a 5–4 victory. In the night game of the double-header, and final game of the series, pitcher Hunter Dobbins made his major league debut starting for the Red Sox against Miles Mikolas. Allowing two runs across 5 innings, Dobbins was supported by Boston's hitters, who gave the team a 10–1 lead over St. Louis after only three innings. Though the Cardinals scored a further five runs against reliever Cooper Criswell, the Red Sox earned another eight to take the series 2–1 with a final score of 18–7.

Series result: Red Sox 2–1 Cardinals (36–20 runs)

April 7–10, vs. Toronto Blue Jays

On April 7, Richard Fitts started for the Red Sox against José Berríos of the Blue Jays, going 6 innings with four strikeouts and three earned runs. Berríos allowed just one run across 7 innings of work, and the Blue Jays won the game 6–2, ending the Red Sox’ five-game winning streak. In the second game of the series, Boston's Garrett Crochet exited with only two runs allowed (one earned) through 5 2/3 innings, having gone scoreless through the first 5, before Toronto won the game 6–1. The Red Sox were dealt a 2–1 extra-innings loss in the third game of the series when the score remained tied through to the 11th until Ernie Clement scored a run for Toronto after a sacrifice fly, which the Red Sox were unable to answer in the bottom of the inning. On Thursday afternoon, Walker Buehler opposed Chris Bassitt, giving up one run and four hits against seven strikeouts across 6 1/3 innings. The Blue Jays held a 2–1 lead until wild pitch at the bottom of the 8th allowed Rob Refsnyder to even the score for Boston; David Hamilton then scored the winning run for the Red Sox on an error in the bottom of the 10th for a 4–3 victory.

Series result: Red Sox 1–3 Blue Jays (8–17 runs)

April 11–13, at Chicago White Sox

In the first game of this weekend series, Sean Newcomb faced Chicago's Davis Martin. The Red Sox’ only run of the game was from a sacrifice fly from Blake Sabol in the top of the 7th inning after Martin went 6 innings and collected six strikeouts, while the White Sox went on to score eleven runs for a final score of 11–1. The following day, Richard Fitts took the mound for game two, going 5 innings and striking out five White Sox, allowing just two hits and zero runs. Chicago's Martín Pérez held the Red Sox scoreless through four innings while the White Sox tied the game at the bottom of the 6th. Chicago earned a walk-off win with an RBI single for a 3–2 final score, the Red Sox’ fifth loss of their last six games. Garrett Crochet struck out eleven White Sox batters and threw a no-hitter through 7 1/3 innings in the final game of the series, with a final line of one run, one hit, and one walk across a total 7 1/3 innings pitched. After Trevor Story hit a 2-RBI double, and followed up with a solo home run in the 9th, Boston earned a 3–1 victory.

Series result: Red Sox 1–2 White Sox (6–15 runs)

April 14–16, at Tampa Bay Rays

The Red Sox opened their road series against the Rays with Tanner Houck, who only went 2 1/3 innings and exited with a scoreline of 12 runs and 10 hits. Kristian Campbell hit a solo home run off of Shane Baz at the top of the 3rd for Boston's only run of the game, while Baz recorded 11 Red Sox strikeouts and allowed only two further hits for a 16–1 Red Sox defeat. On April 15, Alex Bregman hit his first 5-hit and 5-for-5 game of his career, while Red Sox starter Walker Buehler finished with three strikeouts, two runs and three walks after 5 innings. Aroldis Chapman replaced reliever Zack Kelly for the save to bring the final score to a 7–4 Red Sox win. In game three, Sean Newcomb struck out four Tampa Bay batters and allowed four hits without a run in 4 2/3 innings pitched, followed by three pitchers from the bullpen who earned a total of nine strikeouts and allowed only one hit. The Red Sox accompanied their pitching performance with a solo home run by David Hamilton for a 1–0 shutout victory against the Rays’ Zack Littell.

Series result: Red Sox 2–1 Rays (9–20 runs)

April 18–21, vs. Chicago White Sox

The Red Sox opened their four-game Patriots' Day weekend series at Fenway against the White Sox with an early 3–0 lead after the first inning following a 2-RBI home run by Trevor Story. Boston recorded three more home runs, including the first major league home run for Carlos Narváez, and Red Sox starter Hunter Dobbins struck out six Chicago batters in 6 innings—allowing two runs and only three hits—to record a 10–3 win. In Garrett Crochet’s second start against Chicago he struck out seven and allowed only four hits across 6 innings before the game went into extra innings tied at 3–3. After Chicago went scoreless through the top of the 10th inning, Triston Casas hit an RBI single off the top of the Green Monster for the 4–3 victory.

On the Sunday afternoon, Tanner Houck struck out seven hitters and allowed only four hits in 6 innings, however Chicago were able to score runs against Liam Hendriks and Zack Kelly while hold the Red Sox scoreless for 7 innings to deal Boston an 8–4 loss. Notably, this game was Hendriks’ first in nearly two years after recovering from treatment for non-Hodgkin lymphoma and Tommy John surgery. On Patriots' Day, Red Sox starter Walker Buehler went 7 innings with four hits, three walks, one run and nine strikeouts against Chicago, which Boston's batters supported with a solo home run, an RBI single and a 2-RBI single to earn a 4–2 victory and a 3–1 series win.

Series result: Red Sox 3–1 White Sox (22–16 runs)

April 22–24, vs. Seattle Mariners

Brayan Bello started in the Red Sox’ first game against the Mariners at Fenway, opposing Bryce Miller through 5 innings for a scoreline of one run, four hits, and three strikeouts. Seattle then went scoreless through the remaining innings while Boston earned eight runs, including a 2-RBI home run by Triston Casas in the bottom of the 7th, for a Red Sox 8–3 win. In the second game of their series against Seattle on April 23, Sean Newcomb started for the Red Sox and allowed eight hits and four runs, while striking out eight Mariners in his 5 innings pitched. Despite a 2-RBI home run by Casas in the bottom of the 8th, Seattle closer Andrés Muñoz shut Boston down for the remainder of the game for an 8–4 loss. In the rubber game of the series, Garrett Crochet allowed four earned runs in five hits and five walks when he started for Boston, though he also struck out nine Mariners hitters in total across his 5 innings pitched. Seattle's starter Bryan Woo only gave up two runs—a home run in the bottom of the first and an RBI single, both by Alex Bregman—and three hits while striking out eight batters. Muños later came in to again make the save for Seattle and close out the game with a 4–3 defeat for Boston.

Series result: Red Sox 1–2 Mariners (15–16 runs)

April 25–27, at Cleveland Guardians

The first game of this three-game series, scheduled for Friday night, was postponed due to rain. It was rescheduled to Saturday as part of a day-night doubleheader. In the afternoon game on Saturday, Tanner Houck struck out six Cleveland batters while allowing four runs on eight hits and a walk through 5 innings. Despite two home runs early in the game, Boston were shut down through the remaining innings for a 5–4 loss. Later that evening, Walker Buehler started for Boston, allowing three runs and seven hits across 6 innings pitched. In the top of the 3rd inning, Jarren Duran hit an RBI triple against Cleveland starter Doug Nikhazy before stealing home with Rafael Devers at the plate, Boston's first straight steal of home in 16 years to the day. The Red Sox went on to claim a 7–3 victory. On April 27, Red Sox starter Brayan Bello kept Cleveland scoreless through the first 5 innings, only allowing a total of six hits and three runs against four strikeouts in 6 innings pitched. Guardians starter Logan Allen allowed seven earned runs from nine hits in 4 1/3 innings, before Cleveland's relievers allowed a further six runs, resulting in a 13–3 win in Cleveland to end the series.

During the 7th inning of the final game, a fan in attendance at Progressive Field heckled Jarren Duran within earshot, referring to Duran's 2022 suicide attempt which he had recently publicly disclosed. The fan was ejected from the game and removed from the premises, and the Guardians later released a statement apologizing to Duran directly and to the Red Sox as a whole.

Series result: Red Sox 2–1 Guardians (24–11 runs)

April 29–30, at Toronto Blue Jays

The Red Sox began this series against Blue Jays starter Bowden Francis, who went 3 innings pitched and gave up seven earned runs on eight hits with only one strikeout, including five home runs. In the meantime, Boston's starter Garrett Crochet struck out four Blue Jays and allowed only four hits and two runs, paired with scoreless innings by Boston's bullpen to give the Red Sox a 10–2 victory. On April 30, Lucas Giolito made his first start for the Red Sox, striking out seven Blue Jays hitters across 6 innings before allowing two home runs. Boston scored two runs in the top of the 1st inning, followed by a further four runs earned between Toronto's starter Yariel Rodríguez and relievers Eric Lauer and Chad Green. Rodríguez left the game after only one inning, having given up two runs on two hits, including a home run, with two walks and only one strikeout. After the Blue Jays tied the game to force extra innings, the Red Sox went scoreless through the top of the 10th, before Boston reliever Justin Slaten delivered the Red Sox a 7–6 walk-off defeat by allowing a single from Alejandro Kirk.

Series result: Red Sox 1–1 Blue Jays, continued into following month

=== May ===
May game summaries

==== May 1, at Toronto Blue Jays ====
In the final game of the Red Sox' three-game series against the Blue Jays, starter Tanner Houck went 7 innings pitched and recorded only one run off four hits while striking out six batters and allowing no walks. Comparably, Toronto's starter José Berríos struck out eight Red Sox batters across 6 2/3 innings, allowing seven hits and two runs, which came from a 2-RBI double by Alex Bregman which scored David Hamilton and Rob Refsnyder in the top of the 5th. Daulton Varsho scored the Blue Jays' only run against Houck with a solo home run in the bottom of the 7th inning. After Boston reliever Justin Slaten entered the game for the 8th inning, Vladimir Guerrero Jr. gave the Blue Jays the lead with a 2-RBI home run after Slaten allowed a single by Nathan Lukes and a double by Bo Bichette. The Red Sox were unable to score at the top of the 9th against Toronto's Yimi García, resulting in a 4–2 loss.

Series result: Red Sox 1–2 Blue Jays (18–13 runs)

==== May 2–4, vs. Minnesota Twins ====
Returning to Fenway, Brayan Bello started for the Red Sox in the opening game of their series against the Minnesota Twins and their starting pitcher Joe Ryan. In 6 2/3 innings, Bello struck out five Twins batters while only allowing one run and four hits, while Ryan also only allowed one run and four hits, striking out eight. Alex Bregman earned Boston's sole run against Ryan with a solo home run in the bottom of the 1st inning, before the game tied after Ryan Jeffers hit his own solo home run off Bello at the top of the 3rd. Both teams went scoreless until the bottom of the 7th inning, when Rafael Devers hit a 2-RBI single for the Red Sox to send home Connor Wong and David Hamilton. Boston scored again the following inning, beginning with an RBI double from Romy González, and followed by a double by Hamilton to score González before Jarren Duran hit an RBI single to send home Hamilton. Red Sox reliever Justin Wilson was credited with the 6–1 victory.

Notably, González entered the game in the bottom of the 2nd as a pinch-runner and replacement first baseman for Triston Casas, who was carted off the field after a left patellar tendon rupture running to first base. Casas underwent knee surgery a few days later, but the injury would make this game his final appearance of the 2025 season.

Hunter Dobbins started for Boston in the second game of the series on May 3, producing a scoreline of seven hits and four runs across 5 2/3 innings with two strikeouts. He opposed Bailey Ober, who allowed seven hits and only one run in 6 innings while striking out six Red Sox hitters. Boston scored first, with an RBI single by Devers in the bottom of the 3rd, before the Twins tied the game with a sacrifice fly from Ty France at the top of the 4th sending home Carlos Correa. Minnesota's Kody Clemens hit an RBI home run at the top of the 6th, followed by an RBI single from Trevor Larnach, before Duran hit an RBI triple against Twins reliever Brock Stewart in the bottom of the 7th and was then sent home with an RBI single by Devers. Both teams went scoreless for the remaining innings, resulting in a 4–3 loss for the Red Sox.

On Sunday, Red Sox starter Garrett Crochet opposed Twins starter Chris Paddack. Both pitchers went 5 innings, Crochet recording four hits and one run with two walks and six strikeouts against Paddack's five hits, three runs, two walks and two strikeouts. Byron Buxton hit a solo home run at the top of the 1st inning for Crochet's only allowed run, before Carlos Narváez hit a 2-RBI single in the 2nd to take the lead, followed by a sacrifice fly by Romy González to send Alex Bregman home in the following inning. Both teams then went scoreless through to the 7th inning, when Boston reliever Garrett Whitlock allowed a 2-RBI single from Ryan Jeffers to tie the game. The next inning, Minnesota's Harrison Bader’s RBI double was followed by a single from Trevor Larnach to send Bader home for 2 earned runs against Red Sox pitcher Justin Slaten. Wilyer Abreu hit a solo home run in the bottom of the 8th to reduce the Twins' lead to one run, before both teams went scoreless through the 9th, resulting in a 5–4 loss charged against Slaten and a series loss 1–2 against the Twins.

Series result: Red Sox 1–2 Twins (10–13 runs)

==== May 6–8, vs. Texas Rangers ====
Beginning their second series of the year against the Rangers, Lucas Giolito allowed six runs on ten hits and two strikeouts in 3 2/3 innings pitched. Wyatt Langford scored a run after Giolito threw a wild pitch while Langford stood on third base at the top of the 1st inning, though Giolito kept the Rangers scoreless for the next two innings before he 4th, where Texas scored 1 RBI each from a double by Joc Pederson, a sacrifice fly from Adolis García, and singles by Jonah Heim, Josh Smith, and Langford. Boston's Kristian Campbell hit an RBI single off Rangers starter Nathan Eovaldi in the bottom of the 6th to score Alex Bregman, while Red Sox relievers Brennan Bernardino and Sean Newcomb kept Texas scoreless for the remainder of the game, but Boston ultimately lost the game 6–1.

On Thursday, Tanner Houck recorded three runs and six hits with two walks and two strikeouts in 4 2/3 innings pitched as Boston's starter against Texas' Tyler Mahle. Both teams went scoreless through the first two innings, before Corey Seager earned the Rangers an RBI groundout in the top of the 3rd which García followed with a solo home run in the next inning. Solo home runs from Alex Bregman and Wilyer Abreu tied the game in the bottom of the 4th, before Texas regained the lead with a sacrifice fly by García to send Seager home. Beginning at the bottom of the 6th, Abreu hit an RBI double, Bregman scored a 2-RBI single, and Abreu earned a second solo home run in consecutive innings to give the Red Sox the lead. The Rangers recorded a solo home run by Josh Jung against Boston closer Aroldis Chapman in the top of the 9th, before Chapman earned the save and secured the Red Sox a 6–4 win. One of Chapman's pitches was recorded at 103.8 mph (167.0 km/h), the fastest of the 2025 season to that point.

Brayan Bello started for Boston on May 8, giving up four hits and walking five across 4 2/3 innings without allowing a run. The Red Sox meanwhile picked up five runs on six hits, beginning with a run by Trevor Story from a wild pitch in the bottom of the 2nd before Jarren Duran hit an RBI groundout. Rafael Devers and Carlos Narváez then earned RBI singles in the 5th and 6th innings, before Devers hit a solo home run in the 7th to bring Boston to a 5–0 shutout victory.

Series result: Red Sox 2–1 Rangers (12–10 runs)

==== May 9–11, at Kansas City Royals ====
Traveling to Kansas City, the Red Sox opened the weekend series with Hunter Dobbins up against Michael Lorenzen. Dobbins went six scoreless innings, allowing five hits and striking out six Royals, while Lorenzen struck out seven Red Sox and allowed only three hits. The contest went scoreless through all nine regulation innings as well as the 10th, until Rafael Devers hit an RBI ground out to bring ghost runner Ceddanne Rafaela in to score in the top of the 11th inning, which the Royals tied with an RBI single from Vinnie Pasquantino in the bottom half. The Red Sox then went scoreless through the top of the 12th before Kansas City's ghost runner Michael Massey was sent home with an RBI single from Freddy Fermín against Boston reliever Sean Newcomb for a 1–2 Red Sox loss.

Garrett Crochet started the second game of the series, posting a scoreline of one run and seven hits against nine strikeouts over 7 innings. Kansas City's sole run against Crochet came in the form of an RBI single by Mark Canha in the 3rd inning, while Royals starter Cole Ragans recorded four runs from seven hits, two walks, and eight strikeouts in 5 innings pitched. The Red Sox recorded their first run with an RBI double by Rafael Devers in the 3rd, shortly thereafter tied by Canha, before earning a three-run inning in the 5th with consecutive RBI singles by Jarren Duran, Devers, and Alex Bregman. Facing Royals reliever Angel Zerpa in the top of the 7th inning, Trevor Story extended Boston's lead with a 2-RBI home run, before Carlos Narváez hit an RBI home run off Zerpa in the next inning. After Zerpa was relieved by Chris Stratton, Devers delivered a second RBI single for what would be the final run of the game, with both teams scoreless through the remaining inning and a half, leading to Crochet being credited with Boston's 10–1 win.

The Red Sox faced Royals starter Seth Lugo on Sunday afternoon, whose final scoreline was three runs against six hits and five strikeouts across 6 innings pitched. After Boston's starter Lucas Giolito allowed Drew Waters to score on a throwing error in the bottom of the 3rd inning, Wilyer Abreu retaliated with a solo home run in the top of the 4th to tie the game before Devers hit an RBI home run in the 6th. Giolito was relieved in the bottom of the 7th, having recorded just one run and two hits, one walk, and five strikeouts across 6 2/3 innings, and the Red Sox bullpen—Justin Wilson, Greg Weissert, and Aroldis Chapman—then kept Kansas City scoreless to secure a 3–1 victory.

Series result: Red Sox 2–1 Royals (14–4 runs)

==== May 12–14, at Detroit Tigers ====
On May 12, the Red Sox faced off against the Detroit Tigers for the start of a three-game series which brought Boston starter Tanner Houck up against Detroit's Jackson Jobe. Wilyer Abreu hit a solo run in the top of the 6th for the only run Boston scored against Jobe, who posted a scoreline of one run and three hits with seven strikeouts, while Abraham Toro hit a solo home run of his own in the 9th off Tigers reliever John Brebbia. These were Red Sox' only runs of the game, while Houck exited the game after 2 1/3 innings having recorded 11 runs on 9 hits, including three walks and two home runs, without a single strikeout. After an RBI home run by Gleyber Torres in the bottom of the 1st, Houck kept the Tigers scoreless through to the bottom of the 3rd, when they earned 9 runs in the inning: first scoring a run from a wild pitch to Riley Greene, Greene then hit a 2-RBI inside-the-park home run, followed by a second 2-RBI home run by Trey Sweeney and an RBI single by Torres. Justyn-Henry Malloy then earned an RBI single, credited to Houck, after the Boston pitcher was relieved by Sean Newcomb. Newcomb remained in for the remainder of the game, allowing three further runs—two RBI singles by Javier Báez in the 4th and 6th innings, and a run by Malloy on an error in the 7th—for a 14–2 loss.

In the second game of the series, Brayan Bello started for the Red Sox, lasting 4 2/3 innings with two earned runs and six hits against four strikeouts. The first of these runs came from an RBI single by Greene in the bottom of the 1st, before a pickoff error in the bottom of the 3rd resulted in Báez scoring an unearned run with Zach McKinstry at the plate. Spencer Torkelson then hit a solo home run off Bello in the following inning for Detroit's only other earned run against Bello, tying the game after Carlos Narváez hit an RBI single in the 2nd and Alex Bregman hit a solo home run in the top of the 4th, both against Tigers reliever Keider Montero. This was followed by an RBI double from Ceddanne Rafaela and an RBI single by Jarren Duran to put the Red Sox in the lead. The Tigers retook the lead in the bottom of the 6th inning after a 2-RBI home run from Javier Báez off Boston reliever Garrett Whitlock, until David Hamilton tied the game in the top of the 8th with an RBI home run off Tommy Kahnle. Both teams then went scoreless for the remaining regulation innings, sending the contest into extra innings, which started with Red Sox ghost runner Nick Sogard scoring on a force out of Rafaela. Detroit re-tied the game with an RBI single by Trey Sweeney from Greg Weissert, pushing the game into the top of the 11th, where Kristian Campbell hit an RBI home run for a two-run lead. Báez then answered with a 2-RBI home run in the bottom of the inning for a 10–9 walk-off loss for the Red Sox.

Defending Cy Young Award winner Tarik Skubal opposed Boston's Hunter Dobbins in the final game of the series. Dobbins allowed five runs on nine hits, with no walks and four strikeouts, across 5 innings, while Skubal also allowed five runs—on seven hits and against eleven strikeouts—in 7 1/3 innings pitched. The Red Sox began the scoring in the top of the 1st inning with an RBI sacrifice fly by Rob Refsnyder to send home Rafael Devers, countered by an RBI single by Trey Sweeney in the bottom of the 2nd. Both teams earned a run in the 4th inning, starting with a solo home run by Alex Bregman for Boston before Detroit's Dillon Dingler created an RBI ground out. The tie was broken in the bottom of the 6th by an RBI home run from Riley Greene, followed by an RBI sacrifice fly by Sweeney, before the Red Sox scored three runs in the 7th from RBI singles each by Ceddanne Rafaela, Jarren Duran, and Rafael Devers to re-tie the game. Neither team scored in the 8th inning, and the Red Sox went scoreless through the top of the 9th, before Detroit secured the series sweep with an RBI walk-off single from Justyn-Henry Malloy for a 5–6 Red Sox defeat.

Series result: Red Sox 0–3 Tigers (16–30 runs)

==== May 16–18, vs. Atlanta Braves ====
Opening their three-game series at Fenway on May 16 against the Braves, the Red Sox started Garrett Crochet against Chris Sale. Both pitchers went 7 innings and recorded eight strikeouts, Crochet allowing two runs on seven hits against Sale's one run on five hits. Atlanta's two runs against Crochet came from solo home runs by Matt Olson and Sean Murphy at the top of the 2nd inning, while the Boston was kept scoreless until the bottom of the 7th inning, when Rob Refsnyder hit a solo home run of his own. In the top of the 9th inning, Red Sox reliever Brennan Bernardino walked home two runs after he inherited two runners on base from Liam Hendriks, before Braves closer Raisel Iglesias prevented Boston from securing a walk-off win despite allowing an RBI single by Trevor Story to make the final score a 4–2 loss for the Red Sox.

With Lucas Giolito pitching against Atlanta's Grant Holmes in the second game of the series, he pitched 4 innings and recorded a scoreline of six runs on eight hits with three strikeouts, while Holmes allowed two runs on three hits with five strikeouts across 6 innings pitched. Olson hit an RBI home run followed by a solo home run by Marcell Ozuna in the top of the 1st inning, before Giolito allowed a second RBI home run in the top of the 3rd by Drake Baldwin, while Red Sox recorded their first runs in the bottom of the 3rd with an RBI home run by Jarren Duran from Holmes. The Braves again scored a run from Giolito with an RBI single by Austin Riley in the following inning, before both teams went scoreless through to the bottom of the 7th inning. Facing Atlanta reliever Aaron Bummer in the 7th, Rafael Devers hit an RBI single followed by an RBI double by Alex Bregman which sent Devers home, before Garrett Whitlock from Boston's bullpen kept Atlanta scoreless in the top of the 8th. In the bottom of the inning, the Red Sox recorded a 2-RBI single by Jarren Duran to tie the game, before Devers hit a walk-off solo home run in the bottom of the 9th to record a 7–6 victory for Boston.

Up against Braves starter Spencer Schwellenbach, Red Sox pitcher Brayan Bello put up a scoreline of seven runs on ten hits and three strikeouts across 4 1/3 innings pitched which began with an RBI double by Baldwin and an RBI groundout from Ozzie Albies in the top of the 1st inning. Ozuna hit an RBI single against Bello in the 3rd, before the Red Sox recorded their first runs against Schwellenbach in the bottom of the inning with a grand slam by Rafael Devers to take the lead. The score was tied in the 4th inning by an RBI single from Riley, before Bello allowed three runs in the top of the 5th: a walked-in run by Ozuna, followed by an RBI single by Eli White and an RBI sacrifice fly by Nick Allen. Both teams then went scoreless through the next two innings, before the Braves earned an RBI sacrifice fly from Olson and an RBI home run by Ozuna in the top of the 8th which the Red Sox were unable to answer, resulting in a 10–4 defeat to conclude the series.

Series result: Red Sox 1–2 Braves (13–20 runs)

==== May 19–21, vs. New York Mets ====
Hunter Dobbins started for the Red Sox on May 19 against Kodai Senga of the New York Mets, going 4 2/3 and recording one earned run on five hits, with one walk and two strikeouts. He opposed New York's starter Kodai Senga, who pitched 6 innings and posted a scoreline of three runs on five hits and three walks with five strikeouts. After Boston had already earned two runs off Senga in the bottom of the 1st inning, and an RBI triple by Jarren Duran in the bottom of the 2nd, Dobbins' only allowed run came from an RBI single by Tyrone Taylor in the top of the 3rd inning. Both teams then went scoreless through the remainder of the game, resulting in a 3–1 Red Sox win.

On Tuesday, Boston starter Walker Buehler returned from the injured list to face New York's Clay Holmes. In 2 1/3 innings, Buehler recorded no hits, no runs, and four strikeouts before both Buehler and Red Sox manager Alex Cora were ejected from the game by home plate umpire Mike Estabrook after Buehler argued a strike zone call by Estabrook and Cora came to his defense. Holmes, meanwhile, went 6 innings and allowed only two runs on four hits while striking out five Red Sox batters. The two runs against Holmes both came at the bottom of the 5th with solo home runs by Carlos Narváez and Rafael Devers, before Mets reliever Max Kranick held the Red Sox scoreless through the final innings. Boston's bullpen—beginning with Buehler's replacement Brennan Bernardino—combined after Buehler's ejection to give up only four hits and record three strikeouts through the remainder of the game without allowing the Mets to record a single run, delivering Boston a 2–0 victory.

In the final game of the series, Garrett Crochet started for the Red Sox against Tylor Megill, and went 5 1/3 innings allowing one earned run and five hits with five Mets strikeouts against Megill's scoreline of one run on four hits and ten strikeouts across 4 2/3 innings pitched. New York scored first with an RBI single by Brett Baty at the top of the 2nd inning, before both teams went scoreless until Boston recorded an RBI sacrifice fly at the bottom of the 5th by Jarren Duran. After Red Sox reliever Liam Hendriks was replaced by Brennan Bernardino with bases loaded in the top of the 7th inning, Baty recorded a 2-RBI single to give the Mets the lead, followed by an RBI sacrifice fly from Juan Soto before the inning concluded. New York recorded a further run off Sean Newcomb with a solo home run at the top of the 9th, and otherwise held Boston scoreless to deliver a 5–1 Red Sox defeat.

Series result: Red Sox 2–1 Mets (6–6 runs)

==== May 22–25, vs. Baltimore Orioles ====
The first game of this series, scheduled for May 22, was postponed due to rain and rescheduled for the afternoon of May 23 as part of a day-night doubleheader.

After being postponed into a doubleheader, the first game set starter Brayan Bello against Cade Povich. Going 4 innings, Bello allowed two runs on six hits with seven strikeouts after Baltimore scored first with an RBI single by Jackson Holliday and an RBI ground out from Adley Rutschman in the top of the 3rd. Povich recorded one run on four hits with six strikeouts in his 5 innings pitched, the run against him coming from an RBI groundout by Nick Sogard in the bottom of the 4th inning. After Povich was relieved by Seranthony Domínguez for the bottom of the 6th, Ceddanne Rafaela hit an RBI single before Domínguez was replaced with Gregory Soto, who then allowed an RBI single by Jarren Duran and a 2-RBI home run from Rafael Devers to give Boston a four run lead before Ramón Urías recorded an RBI single off Red Sox reliever Justin Slaten in the top of the 8th to bring the Orioles within three. At the bottom of the inning, the Red Sox first faced Cionel Pérez, who allowed five runs to score including a 2-RBI home run from Rob Refsnyder, before he was relieved by Emmanuel Rivera. Boston then recorded a further eight runs with a grand slam by Devers among them. The Orioles earned back two runs at the top of the 9th from Abraham Toro, ordinarily a position player, in the form of an RBI double by Holliday and an RBI sacrifice fly from Ryan Mountcastle, before the game ended in a 19–5 victory for the Red Sox.

The second game of the doubleheader scheduled for May 23 after the May 22 postponement also had to be postponed, and was rescheduled for May 24 as part of a day-night doubleheader.

In Saturday's first game, Hunter Dobbins opposed Zach Eflin, recording a scoreline of four runs on five hits and seven strikeouts over 4 innings pitched. Comparatively, Eflin went 5 innings and allowed four earned runs on five hits. In the top of the 1st inning, Dobbins allowed the first two runs of the game after Ramón Urías hit a 2-RBI double, before the Red Sox tied the game in the bottom half of the inning with solo home runs from Jarren Duran and Wilyer Abreu. Neither team scored again until the top of the 5th, when Dobbins was relieved by Sean Newcomb with two runners on base, before Jackson Holliday hit into an RBI force out to break the tie. Newcomb then allowed an RBI double by Gunnar Henderson and gave up a run off a wild pitch. Abraham Toro reduced the Orioles' lead with a solo home run in the bottom of the inning, followed by a run scored by Devers on a throwing error in the 6th after Carlos Narváez hit into a force out. Nick Sogard then recorded an RBI ground out later in the inning to re-tie the game at the end of the 6th. After both teams remained scoreless through the rest of the regulation innings, the game went to extras, where Greg Weissert prevented Baltimore from scoring another run in the top of the 10th. In the bottom of the inning, Devers hit a single off Gregory Soto to send ghost runner Ceddanne Rafaela home and complete a 6–5 walk-off win.

Lucas Giolito started for the Red Sox on Saturday's second game against Tyler Rogers, giving up six hits without a run and striking out six Orioles batters in 7 innings pitched, while Rogers went 6 1/3 innings and recorded no runs from two hits and five strikeouts. Neither team scored a run until the top of the 8th inning when Ryan O'Hearn hit an RBI single off Boston reliever Luis Guerrero, followed by an RBI double from Dylan Carlson at the top of the 9th. In the bottom of the inning, Abraham Toro recorded a solo home run off Baltimore's Seranthony Domínguez, however Boston was prevented from scoring further, resulting in a 2–1 loss.

In the final game of the series, Walker Buehler pitched opposite Dean Kremer, who both went three scoreless innings before Ramón Urías hit an RBI sacrifice fly to give the Orioles a one-run lead. Buehler was relieved by Greg Weissert after allowing a solo home run by Carlson in the top of the 5th, recording a scoreline of two runs on four hits with three strikeouts across 5 innings, where Weissert allowed a solo home run of his own by O'Hearn before the end of the inning. In the 8th inning, O'Hearn hit an RBI double before scoring his own run after two throwing errors by the Red Sox. Kremer meanwhile had been relieved in the bottom of the 6th inning, allowing no runs from seven hits against four strikeouts, while the Baltimore bullpen kept Boston scoreless through to the bottom of the 9th inning. After a leadoff double by Marcelo Mayer, who had made his MLB debut with the Red Sox the day before, Abraham Toro hit a single off Orioles reliever Andrew Kittredge to send Mayer home, but the Red Sox could not score again and recorded a 5–1 defeat to Baltimore.

Series result: Red Sox 2–2 Orioles (27–17 runs)

==== May 26–28, at Milwaukee Brewers ====
Garrett Crochet started for the Red Sox on Memorial Day in their first game in Milwaukee, opposing Chad Patrick and recording two runs on five hits with eleven strikeouts across 2/3 innings pitched. Brewers leadoff hitter Jackson Chourio began the bottom of the 1st with a solo home run, before Crochet kept Milwaukee scoreless until the bottom of the 5th, when the Brewers received an RBI double from Andruw Monasterio. Patrick, meanwhile, went 4 2/3 innings and recorded three hits and six strikeouts without the Red Sox scoring a run. Boston were kept scoreless until the top of the 8th inning, when Kristian Campbell hit an RBI force out which sent Rafael Devers home, before Eric Haase scored an RBI single with bases loaded on Red Sox reliever Garrett Whitlock to give Milwaukee another run. Despite an RBI single by Jarren Duran at the top of the 9th, Boston could not make up ground on the Brewers and recorded a 2–2 loss.

On Tuesday evening, Richard Fitts went three innings for the Red Sox, with just two hits and two strikeouts, against the Brewers' Aaron Civale. Both pitchers went scoreless through five innings, before Civale allowed a double from Ceddanne Rafaela which resulted in a run after a wild pitch from Milwaukee reliever Aaron Ashby advanced him home. The Brewers remained scoreless until the 9th inning, when Sal Frelick hit an RBI single off Aroldis Chapman to push the game into extra innings. The Red Sox were unable to break the tie in the top of the 10th, before Liam Hendriks came out to pitch for Boston in the bottom of the inning and surrendered a walk-off grand slam to Christian Yelich, resulting in a 5–1 defeat for the Red Sox.

In the final game of the series, Brayan Bello opposed Freddy Peralta for Boston, going 4 2/3 innings and recording one earned run with three hits and two strikeouts while Peralta allowed three runs on six hits with six strikeouts in 5 innings pitched. The Red Sox scored first with a solo home run from Ceddanne Rafaela in the top of the 2nd inning, before Jake Bauers tied the game with his own solo home run at the bottom of the 3rd. Boston retook the lead win the 4th inning with a 2-RBI single by Rafael Devers, which Milwaukee countered with a run in the following inning and subsequent 2-RBI double by Caleb Durbin in the 6th. Wilyer Abreu hit a solo home run to tie the game in the 7th off Brewers reliever Nick Mears, forcing the game into extras with neither team able to score in the final two regulation innings. In the top of the 10th inning, David Hamilton hit into a force out which sent ghost runner Nick Sogard home to break the tie for Boston, before Milwaukee re-tied the game again in the bottom of the inning and then delivered an RBI sacrifice fly from Durbin to give the Red Sox a 6–5 walk-off loss.

Series result: Red Sox 0–3 Brewers (8–14 runs)

==== May 30–31, at Atlanta Braves ====
Red Sox starter Lucas Giolito faced Grant Holmes in the first game of a three-game series in Atlanta, allowing one run on five hits with three strikeouts across 4 1/3 innings; the one run coming from a throwing error off a single hit by Matt Olson which allowed Ronald Acuña Jr. to advance home. The Red Sox took the lead from the Braves with an RBI home run by Trevor Story in the top of the 4th, followed by an RBI double from Abraham Toro in the top of the 6th inning and a 2-RBI single by Rafael Devers in the top of the 9th, securing a 5–1 victory.

On Saturday, Walker Buehler started for Boston against Atlanta's Spencer Schwellenbach. While Schwellenbach pitched 6 1/3 scoreless innings with five hits and eleven strikeouts, Buehler allowed five runs on ten hits, with six strikeouts, in 5 2/3 innings pitched. The Braves' first run was a Olson RBI double in the bottom of the 1st, before Austin Riley hit a solo home run in the bottom of the 4th which was followed by an RBI single from Michael Harris II and an RBI home run by Acuña Jr.. Both teams' bullpens went scoreless through the remainder of the game, resulting in a 5–0 defeat for Boston and tying the series in the final game of the month.

Series result: Red Sox 1–1 Braves (5–6 runs), continued into following month

=== June ===
June game summaries

==== June 1, at Atlanta Braves ====
The Red Sox opened June desperately needing the change in the calendar after an 11–17 May. With burgeoning ace Garrett Crochet in the mound in the rubber game of the Sox' series in Atlanta, the Braves countered by dispatching Bryce Elder to the bump. Crochet outdueled Elder in yet another low-scoring game; the Mississippi native twirled seven full innings and gave up just one run on five hits while striking out twelve Atlanta hitters; Elder did not perform poorly but was shaky early, surrendering three runs, all of them earned, in the first inning – all the runs the Sox would need – on a total of six hits across 5 1/3 innings, walking three and striking out four. The Red Sox' run-scoring came all in the top 1st – indeed, all on one hit – but Crochet's strong outing would make them hold up. Rafael Devers doubled to deep right center field, and Abraham Toro singled to left to advance Devers to third two at-bats later. Marcelo Mayer then drew a walk from Elder to advance Toro to second load the bases. All the baserunners came home on a 3-RBI double that Trevor Story stroked to deep center, instantly putting the Sox up 3–0. A Kristian Campbell groundout got Elder out of the jam. In the bottom half of the inning, Marcell Ozuna hit a solo home run to right field following two Crochet strikeouts. Boston's starter recovered right away, though, inducing a Matt Olson groundout to end the inning. Crochet struck out two more in the 2nd and got revenge on Ozuna by fanning him in the 3rd with two outs and two men on for Atlanta. Crochet hurled only one inning out of seven – the bottom 5th – without striking out a Braves batter. Greg Weissert came on for the Sox in the bottom 8th and pitched a one-two-three frame to build a bridge to closer Aroldis Chapman, who in the 9th retired three of four Braves to secure the 3–1 win and earn his ninth save of the year. Crochet improved to 5–4 while Elder dropped to 2–3. It still was a frustrating road trip for Boston – a 2–4 journey through two cities that included consecutive walk-off losses – but the Red Sox ended the Braves series on a positive note, looking to establish further momentum with a three-game home series against the Angels. Richard Fitts was scheduled to start in the Monday opener, looking for his first win of the season.

Red Sox won the series, 2–1 (8–7 runs)

==== June 2–4, vs. Los Angeles Angels ====
The first contest of a three-game home series at Fenway was won by the Angels, 7–6. Boston starter Richard Fitts allowed six runs (five earned) in the first inning, including three home runs, and took the loss. It was the first time any visiting team had ever hit three first-inning home runs at Fenway Park. Reliever Hunter Dobbins pitched the next five innings and allowed just one run, giving Boston a chance to make the game competitive, mainly via a four-run bottom of the fourth inning. Entering the ninth with a one-run deficit, the Red Sox were unable to score against Los Angeles (and former Boston) closer Kenley Jansen. Jarren Duran had three hits and scored twice, while Ceddanne Rafaela homered. Defensively, Boston committed two errors.

The second game of the series went to extra innings, with the Angels winning, 4–3. Red Sox starter Brayan Bello had a no decision after allowing three runs on seven hits in six innings. The three runs he allowed all came in the third inning, putting Los Angeles ahead, 3–0. Boston tied the game after scoring once in the bottom of the third, and twice in the bottom of the sixth. After neither team could score in the final three innings of regulation, the Angels scored once in the top of the 10th off of Zack Kelly; he took the loss when the Red Sox were unable to score in the bottom of the frame. Rafaela again homered, but also committed one of Boston's three errors during the game.

Boston avoided being swept in the series by winning the closing game on Wednesday afternoon, 11–9. Starter Lucas Giolito left after 1 2/3 innings, having allowed seven runs on eight hits, but escaped with a no decision. Losing 7–5 through the first three innings, the Red Sox outscored the Angles in the final six innings, 6–2. Cooper Criswell, the seventh Boston pitcher of the game, recorded the final five outs and was credited with the win. Rafaela hit a two-run walk-off home run, his third consecutive game with a home run. The homer went around the Pesky Pole—measured at just 308 feet (94 m), it was the second-shortest major-league home run in the Statcast era (since 2015).

Red Sox lost the series, 1–2 (20–20 runs)

==== June 6–8, at New York Yankees ====
The Red Sox opened a three-game series at the belly of the beast – Yankee Stadium – against their hated rival New York Yankees in the two teams' first meeting of 2025. Boston sent Walker Buehler to the mound to oppose New York's Will Warren. The Yankees pounced on Buehler immediately, tagging the starter for a five-run bottom of the 1st, as Buehler gave up two home runs – a 3-run bomb to center by Jazz Chisholm Jr. that came with Aaron Judge and Trent Grisham on base, and a 2-run long ball over the infamous right-field "short porch", coming with Jasson Dominguez on base. Buehler was pulled after a bottom 2nd that went little better, as he gave up two New York runs to put the Yanks up 7–0. Chisholm struck again when his single with two men on brought home Judge and advanced Paul Goldschmidt to third, and, with the bases loaded, Goldschmidt was forced to jog home after Buehler hit Volpe with a pitch. The Red Sox would come back in this game, but the damage was done, as Buehler exited with an abysmal scoreline of seven runs (five earned) on seven hits and two walks across two innings. Zack Kelly relieved Buehler. In the top of the 5th, the Yankee bats having been quieted temporarily by the Sox pen, Boston got on the board when Marcelo Mayer turned on a pitch from Warren and sent it over the center-field wall for a lead-off solo shot – his first major league home run. The Yankees added an eighth run in the bottom 5th and a ninth in the bottom 7th (a Goldschmidt home run), but Boston scattered five runs across the top 6th and top 7th, efforts that included a Romy González 2-RBI single and a Rafael Devers solo home run, his 13th of the year. However, the Sox offense faltered in the 8th and 9th against the back end of New York's bullpen while trailing by three, and Warren was credited with the win (4 runs on 3 hits with six strikeouts in 5 1/3 innings), and Devin Williams earned his seventh save of the year for the Yankees. The Sox would look for better returns in the Saturday middle game with Garrett Crochet set to start.

In the Saturday evening tilt, nationally televised on FOX, Crochet took to the mound against the Yankees' Ryan Yarbrough, but this game would turn out to be a showcase of power bats rather than power arms. The Sox drew first blood with a Kristian Campbell RBI single in the top of the 2nd, but Crochet struggled in the bottom half of the frame, giving up a leadoff hit to Cody Bellinger and walking DJ LeMahieu prior to hanging a pitch to Yanks catcher Austin Wells that Wells let sail over the right field short porch, at a stroke putting New York up 3–1. Fortunately for the Red Sox, their offense not only recovered in the top 3rd but found a significant groove, keeping the line moving with a five-run inning that put Boston right back ahead, 6–3. The run-scoring started with Abraham Toro singling up the middle with the bases loaded, which allowed Rob Refsnyder to jog home and score to pull the Sox within a run. Trevor Story then laced a double to left field which allowed Toro to score the tying run, let Romy González score the go-ahead run, and enabled Carlos Narváez to hustle home ahead of the throw to score a third run, putting the Sox up 5–3. Boston added its sixth run of the evening two batters later when a Campbell base hit brought home Story. Crochet recovered in the bottom 3rd with a 1-2-3 inning, and in the top 4th González tagged Yarbrough for a 2-run shot to left field that put the Sox up by 5, 8–3. Yarbrough was pulled after four innings. The Yankees were not done, however, and a Wells RBI double and a Pablo Reyes RBI ground out in the bottom 4th pulled New York to within three runs with an 8–5 deficit. Crochet was pulled after six innings of work (a final scoreline of five runs on six hits, but with nine strikeouts), and LeMahieu's timely single with two men on in the bottom 8th scored two Yankee runners and cut Boston's lead to 8–7. Rather than risk their fortune in yet another one-run game, however, Boston's offense ignited again in the top of the 9th, as Story's bloop single to center with two men on scored Narváez and Mayer, refreshing Boston's lead to 10–7. Closer Aroldis Chapman then came on for the bottom 9th, and the former Yankee hurled a 1-2-3 frame to shut down his former team and earn his 10th save of 2025. With the victory, the series would again come down to a rubber game, this time a Sunday Night Baseball matchup between Hunter Dobbins and Carlos Rodón.

Dobbins, after a brief stint on bullpen duty, returned to the starting pitcher role in the rubber match against Rodón and the Yankees in what would prove to be another slugfest. Again, the Yankees took Boston deep early, as Aaron Judge smashed his 22nd long ball of the season – a 2-run homer – to center field to put New York ahead 2–0 after one inning. However, Dobbins recovered, and he and Rodón kept the game otherwise scoreless until the top of the 5th inning. In the 5th, the Red Sox finally put Yankee Stadium's short porch in right field to their advantage, as Campbell squeaked a Rodón offering over the wall with Ceddanne Rafaela on base, tying the game at 2–2. In the bottom 5th, however, DJ LeMahieu returned the favor with a solo homer, also to right, giving the Yankees a 3–2 lead. In the top 6th, Boston's bats broke the game open, beginning with a rather poetic home run – Carlos Narváez, who had spent nearly a decade in the Yankees organization before joining Boston prior to the 2025 campaign, smoked a pitch to left field for his first career home run at Yankee Stadium – against his former team. It was Narváez's 6th home run of the year and came with both Refsnyder and Devers on base, making for a 3-run jack that put Boston up 5–3. The Sox added two more runs on the inning when Jarren Duran's shallow infield single brought home baserunners Story and Toro. Up 7–3, the Red Sox went to the bullpen for the 6th inning after getting five solid frames from Dobbins, who finished with a scoreline of three earned runs on four hits; Rodón also had been pulled after five, having given up five runs on three hits and three walks. In the Yankees' bottom 6th, New York answered Boston's offense with a 2-run frame (a Jazz Chisholm Jr. RBI sac fly; a Trent Grisham bases-loaded walk forcing home a baserunner) to pull the score to 7–5. The 7th inning was scoreless, but Boston added two runs in the top 8th, both off solo long balls (Toro's 4th home run; Story's 8th). After a scoreless bottom 8th from the Boston pen, the Red Sox hitters could have eased off the gas – but did not, as Devers added his own solo home run and Toro continued a productive evening with an RBI double to score Marcelo Mayer. Now up 11–5, Boston hoped to give Aroldis Chapman a night of rest, but the Yankees tagged reliever Robert Stock for two runs in 2/3 of an inning, forcing Boston to summon Chapman, who closed the door on an 11–7 victory to seal the series win for the Sox. Boston took two consecutive and two of three games from the Yankees in the Bronx, and the team would return to Fenway Park for a homestand looking to build on some much-needed momentum. Starters Dobbins and Rodón were credited with the win and loss, bringing their records to 3–1 and 8–4, respectively.

Red Sox won the series, 2–1 (27–23 runs)

==== June 9–11, vs. Tampa Bay Rays ====
Boston returned to Fenway Park to open a three-game series against division rival Tampa Bay, a highly anticipated contest due to both the MLB debut of Roman Anthony, who had crushed a 498-foot home run with AAA Worcester over the weekend, and also because of Boston's impressive back-to-back wins at Yankee Stadium against a stalwart New York team. However, Anthony would go for 0-for-4 in an extra-inning heartbreaker that the Red Sox would lose in 11 innings, 10–8. Brayan Bello faced Tampa Bay's Shane Baz – neither starter would earn a decision. Bello's outing was middling (4 runs, 3 earned on 7 hits and a walk, with 4 strikeouts in 6 1/3 innings), while Baz hurled 5 1/3 innings while giving up 3 runs on 3 hits with 3 walks and striking out 5 Red Sox. Bello and Baz kept the contest scoreless through the first three innings, before Jake Mangum drew first blood in the 4th with an RBI single for Tampa. In the top 5th, Brandon Lowe stroked an RBI single to left and Yandy Diaz hit an RBI single to right to advanced all the way to third base on an Anthony fielding error. In the bottom half of the inning, trailing 3–0, Connor Wong hit into an RBI ground out to put Boston on the board. In the 6th, the Rays went scoreless while Boston tied the game courtesy of a 2-RBI double from Romy González, scoring Abraham Toro and Rafael Devers. In the 7th, though, the Rays would retake the lead off Sox reliever Brennan Bernardino. Josh Lowe doubled to deep right center to bring home Taylor Walls, and then scored on a Bernardino wild pitch to Jonathan Aranda, who singled in Díaz. Boston now trailed 6–3, but drew within two runs in the bottom 7th courtesy of a Toro RBI ground out followed by a Story single that drove in Jarren Duran. The 8th passed with neither team scoring, and then the Rays expanded their lead in the top 9th, as Aranda hit a sac fly to put Tampa Bay up by two. In the bottom 9th, the Sox were up against the wall, but scratched out two runs to tie the game at 7–7 and force extra innings – Anthony hit into a ground out that permitted Devers to scramble home, and Kristian Campbell singled in the infield to score Toro. In the top 10th, with the aid of a designated runner on second base, Walls hit a sac fly to put Tampa up by one, but Aroldis Chapman, pitching in his third consecutive game, put out the fire. In the bottom 10th, with Ceddanne Rafaela having been placed on second base, the Sox scored a very lucky game-tying run when Rafaela hustled all the way from second base to home plate on an infield dribbler from Toro, which appeared to be the game-ending putout, until Aranda committed both a fielding and a throwing error enabling Toro to reach and Rafaela to score. Rafaela perhaps angered the baseball gods, however, when he lost track of the score and celebrated as if he had scored the winning run; Story popped out to end the inning and reliever Zack Kelly subsequently allowed two runs to score, including one on a bases-loaded walk to Junior Caminero, in the top of the 11th. In the bottom 11th, needing another two runs just to force a 12th frame, Rob Refsnyder, pinch-hitting for Anthony, drew a walk, but Campbell lined out, González was called out on strikes (a pitch that appeared low to manager Alex Cora, who was subsequently ejected for arguing the call), and Rafaela lined out, ensuring Tampa the victory and Boston yet another extra-inning loss (in their 12th extra-inning game of the season, they fell to 4–8 in such games). Ian Seymour got the win in relief in his own major league debut, while Kelly was saddled with the loss, falling to 1–3. Struggling Lucas Giolito would look to provide a quality start for the Sox in game two of the series on Tuesday.

The Red Sox sent Giolito to the bump on Tuesday to oppose Ryan Pepiot. Giolito had a fine outing, overcoming three walks to give up just one run on three hits while striking out four Rays hitters across six innings of work. For Tampa Bay, Pepiot hurled 5 2/3 innings, and, despite striking out nine Boston batters, gave up three runs, all earned, on five hits, with two walks. Boston's bullpen would be strong enough to prop up Giolito's start and shut down the Rays in the late innings. Roman Anthony's middling performance in his major league debut was put in the past with an impressive game two performance, coming with his family in the stands. Anthony gave Boston its first lead of the game and notched his first major league hit and RBIs when, in the bottom of the 1st, he placed a Pepiot pitch in deep left field for a 2-RBI double that brought home baserunners Carlos Narváez and Devers. Giolito and Pepiot traded scoreless frames in the 2nd, 3rd, and 4th before Tampa Bay scratched out a run in the top 5th, courtesy of Díaz, who singled up the middle to score José Caballero. In the bottom of the 6th, the Sox added a pivotal insurance run when Story crushed a Pepiot offering over the Green Monster for a solo shot, giving Boston a 3–1 lead. After six innings pitched, Giolito was pulled in favor of reliever Garrett Whitlock, who struck out three Rays across two innings; in the top 9th, Boston entered a save situation, but with Chapman having pitched in three straight games, the Red Sox opted to rest Chapman in favor of Greg Weissert, who earned his first save of the season with a one-two-three inning. Giolito improved to 2–1 while Pepiot fell to 3–6. Having won three of their last four, Boston would look to take the deciding game of the series on Wednesday with Walker Buehler toeing the rubber.

Walker Buehler faced Rays starter Zack Littell in the rubber contest of this three-game series. Buehler twirled one of his finest outings of the season, giving up three runs on three hits but striking out seven Rays while lasting seven innings to give many members of Boston's bullpen some much-needed rest. The Sox, meanwhile, tagged Littell for four runs on eight hits across six frames. The Red Sox got the offense going in the bottom half of the 1st, when Duran blasted a pitch over the center field wall for a solo home run. In the top 2nd, Tampa Bay tied the score courtesy of a Josh Lowe force out that allowed Mangum to scurry home. But Boston answered back in the bottom 2nd, restoring their lead with another solo bomb, this one off the lumber of rookie Marcelo Mayer, who took Littell deep for his second career home run and first at Fenway. The 3rd inning was scoreless, but in the 4th Mayer pounced on Littell again for a second long ball to put the Sox up 3–1. Both home runs landed in the same area of the stands beyond right field. The home run derby-esque air of this contest continued with Yandy Díaz, who tied the game at 3–3 with a 2-run shot to left off of Buehler in the 5th. The BoSox went ahead for good, however, on a third Boston solo shot, this one to center field in the bottom 5th courtesy of Abraham Toro, who continued his hot streak. After pitching seven innings, Buehler left the mound and Justin Wilson worked the 8th with Weissert. Chapman was called upon in a save situation, and a rather perilous one given Boston's poor luck with one-run leads. However, the Sox closer fanned two of three batters he faced to rack up his twelfth save of 2025, giving Boston a much-needed second consecutive series win and victories in four of their last five games, important momentum heading into a weekend series where the Sox would redo battle with the Yankees, this team at Fenway. Garrett Crochet was scheduled to start the Friday opener after a Thursday off day.

Red Sox won the series, 2–1 (15–14 runs)

==== June 13–15, vs. New York Yankees ====
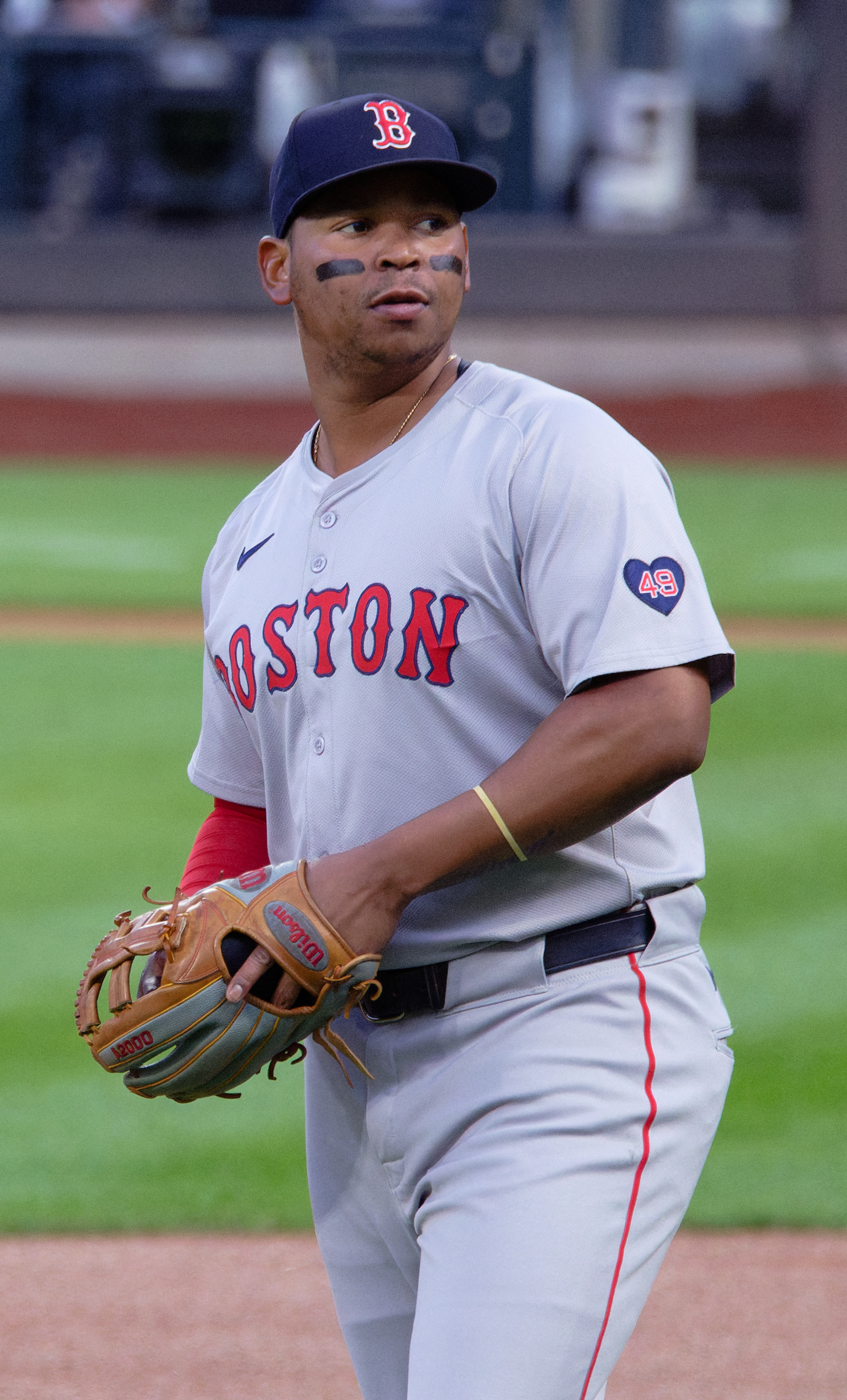
Fan favorite and franchise slugger Rafael Devers provided a home run in Sunday's victory against the Yankees, but the 2018 World Series champion was traded to the San Francisco Giants just hours after the game.

The Red Sox entered a weekend series against at their bitter rival Yankees having taken two of three from New York the previous weekend in the Bronx. Winners of four of their last five, they were determined to keep the positive momentum going and rack up more victories against their enemies. Ace Garrett Crochet took the hill in the Friday night opener alongside the Yanks' Ryan Yarbrough. Yarbrough pitched 4 2/3 innings and gave up one run on four hits with three strikeouts, and it was a bullpen game from then on – albeit an effective one – for the Bronx Bombers. Yarbrough's lone earned run came in the bottom of the 2nd inning, when Ceddanne Rafaela singled up the middle to score Trevor Story from second base, giving Boston a 1–0 advantage they would hold for six innings. Crochet, meanwhile, had one of the best games of his career – and certainly the longest outing of his career – by twirling eight masterful scoreless frames while fanning seven Yankee hitters. Crochet also struck out superstar slugger Aaron Judge thrice, continuing his mastery over Judge from his Saturday outing in the previous weekend's series. Unfortunately, Judge would have something to say about Crochet's success – after manager Alex Cora elected to keep Crochet in the game in the pursuit of a complete game shutout, Crochet entered the top 9th and induced a ground ball out from Ben Rice before staring down Judge again. Crochet worked Judge to a 3–2 count before Judge drilled a Crochet offering to deep left center field for a solo home run, tying the score at 1–1 and silencing the Fenway faithful. Cora summarily pulled Crochet in favor of Aroldis Chapman, who cleaned up the inning, and the Red Sox then had a scoreless bottom 9th to force extras. Crochet's final scoreline was 8 1/3 innings, one earned run on four hits, seven strikeouts and one walk – still a sterling evening by any measure, especially against the Yankees offense. However, Crochet would not be able to earn a win in the contest, as the decisions now fell to the relievers as the game entered the 10th inning. In the top 10th, Garrett Whitlock appeared in relief and faced the Yanks with Anthony Volpe as their designated runner on second base. Volpe attempted to steal third but catcher Carlos Narváez caught Whitlock's pitch to Jasson Domínguez and then threw to third beautifully, his throw reaching Marcelo Mayer in time for the tag. Dominguez was subsequently called out on strikes, and Whitlock then induced a DJ LeMahieu groundout. In the bottom of the 10th, Narváez struck gold again, this time with his bat. As the first hitter of the frame, he lined a Tim Hill pitch deep to left center field, scoring ghost runner David Hamilton from second, giving Boston the 2–1 walk-off victory, rescuing Crochet's splendid performance (though Whitlock was credited with the win), and giving the Red Sox their first three-game winning streak since April 26–29. The Sox would look to extend the streak to four in the middle game on Saturday, with Hunter Dobbins set for a rematch with the Yankees' Carlos Rodón.

The nationally televised middle game of the series was a rematch between Dobbins and Rodón who had faced each other just six days prior in the Bronx. Dobbins had a fine outing, going six innings and giving up just two hits and one walk while striking out five Yankee hitters. Rodón went five innings and gave up all of Boston's runs (four, though one was unearned), while surrendering seven hits and walking two while fanning four. Boston jumped on Rodón early, taking a 1–0 lead in the top 1st when Narváez hit the ball to Volpe at shortstop, who committed a throwing error allowing Narváez to reach base and Rob Refsnyder to score. After two scoreless innings, the Sox added on when Story continued his hot hitting with an RBI double to center that brought home Narváez. In the 5th, Romy González doubled to right center, scoring Kristian Campbell. The Sox kept the offense going with a Marcelo Mayer RBI sacrifice fly in the bottom 6th that enabled Story to score, giving Boston a 4–0 advantage. However, once Dobbins and Rodón were both out of the game, fortunes seemed to be reversing in New York's favor: Yerry De Los Santos came in relief for the Yanks and pitched the remainder of the game while giving up no hits in three innings, whereas the Yankees bats found life against the Boston pen. In the bottom of the 7th, New York got to Sox reliever Luis Guerrero for two runs: a Jasson Domínguez RBI single which scored Paul Goldschmidt, and an Austin Wells RBI single that scored Jazz Chisholm Jr.. Still down two, the Yankees were shut down in the 8th, but resurfaced in the 9th when Alex Cora opted to pitch Greg Weissert in the closer role instead of Chapman. Weissert immediately surrendered a double to Goldschmidt and then allowed him to advance to third on a groundout. Volpe then scored Goldschmidt on another groundout, putting the score at 4–3, and though Boston had the Yankees down to their final out, Domínguez cracked a double to deep left field to put the tying run 180 feet from home plate. Fortunately, Weissert induced a pop fly to center fielder Rafaela, which mercifully marked the game's final out as the Red Sox pulled a pivotal victory out by the skin of their teeth, ensuring a series win and granting them their fourth consecutive triumph. The win also put the Sox back at .500 for the first time since May 24. The Red Sox would look to sweep the Yankees, and take five of six from them in their two June series, with a win on Sunday afternoon with Brayan Bello scheduled to face Max Fried.

Bello faced Fried on Sunday afternoon in what would turn out to be a very bittersweet contest for the Red Sox. Bello reminded fans who were enamored with Crochet that not so long ago he was the Sox' flashy new pitcher, and did so by way of a seven-inning outing in which he gave up just three hits while striking out eight Yankee hitters. The bullpen was also sterling, with Brennan Bernardino and Garrett Whitlock combining to pitch the remaining two innings, allowing just two hits; Whitlock recorded his first save of the season, as the Sox held New York scoreless to give up just four runs from New York all weekend. The Sox, too, had a light day an offense, but with the pitching in such good shape, they did not require much. Story got things going with yet another 1st inning RBI for Boston, placing a Fried pitch in shallow left field to score Romy González. While Fried was efficient in innings two through four, he gave up a two-out jack to Rafael Devers in the bottom 5th, which bounced off the top of the Green Monster. This solo long ball gave Boston a 2–0 advantage and all the offense Boston would need, but little did anyone in the stands know that it would prove to be Devers' presumptive final home run in a Red Sox uniform. Bello struck out all three batters he faced in the 6th and ended his outing with a strikeout in the seventh, but as the bullpen cruised to victory, giving the Red Sox a three-game sweep of their mortal rivals, the good vibes would soon be upended. Boston's win put them at two games above .500 and put their June record at 9–4, sending their win streak to five games.

At 6:59 p.m., Jeff Passan sent out a post on X that announced Devers had been traded to the San Francisco Giants in exchange for pitchers Jordan Hicks and Kyle Harrison and two minor-leaguer players. The trade was later confirmed by the Red Sox. While Devers had made headlines early in the season for uncharacteristically poor plate appearances and internal drama regarding what position he should regularly play, Devers had returned to his usual All-Star numbers in May and June, and the front office disagreements appeared to have subsided. Now, however, the Sox would head out to Seattle to begin a 9-game West Coast road trip (which ironically would include a three—game set against the Giants at Devers' new stomping grounds in San Francisco) dealing with two very different emotions: the high of having played perhaps their best weekend of baseball of the entire season, against their division rivals no less, and the low of having traded away a face-of-the-franchise dominant hitter, the last remaining player who was on the Sox' World Series-winning roster in 2018. With how they respond to the trade potentially deciding the direction of their season, the Sox would enter the post-Devers era on Monday, with Lucas Giolito set to start against the Mariners' Logan Gilbert.

Red Sox won the series, 3–0 (8–4 runs)

==== June 16–18, at Seattle Mariners ====
One day after the stunning trade of Rafael Devers, it would have been sensible to expect the Red Sox to show some shakiness entering game one of the post-Devers era. However, the team – and especially its pitching staff – proved surprisingly competent, opening a three-game set against the Mariners in the Emerald City with a 2–0 win that pushed the Sox to two games over .500 (38–36) and stretched their win streak to a season-high six games. Lucas Giolito easily had his best outing to date in 2025, striking out ten Seattle hitters and allowing just three hits and one walk across six innings pitched. Seattle starter Logan Gilbert racked up ten strikeouts of his own while also surrendering just three hits, but the Red Sox made their offense count for two earned runs against Gilbert, all the offense they would require in another low-scoring victory. The Red Sox scoring began early and in a rather poetic fashion, as Boston took a 1–0 lead in the top 1st off of a solo home run to center field from highly anticipated rookie Roman Anthony. The blast was Anthony's first in the major leagues – in 2017, when Devers hit his first career long ball, it too came at T-Mobile Park in Seattle. In the top of the 3rd, Abraham Toro reached on an RBI infield single that drove in Jarren Duran to give Boston a 2–0 advantage. The Mariners loaded the bases with no outs in the bottom 3rd, but Giolito worked his way out of the jam by striking out Seattle sluggers J. P. Crawford, Julio Rodríguez, and Cal Raleigh in succession. In the 7th, the Sox turned to reliever Justin Wilson, who induced a pop fly out from Dominic Canzone and struck out Ben Williamson to end the inning after Seattle had had two men on base with one out. Greg Weissert worked the 8th for Boston, and again the Mariners got the tying run on base, this time with no outs, but Weissert induced a Rodríguez lineout, struck out Raleigh, and retired Jorge Polanco to again stifle a Seattle scoring threat. Closer Aroldis Chapman struck out all three batters he faced in the bottom 9th to shut the door on the Mariners and grab his 13th save of the season. All told, Giolito and the bullpen struck out a total of fifteen Seattle hitters. With the Sox having responded well in the wake of the Devers trade, the team would look to extend their win streak to seven on Tuesday in the middle game of the series; Walker Buehler was scheduled to take the mound for Boston against the Mariners' Bryan Woo.

The Red Sox' six-game winning streak had included several low-scoring victories, including back-to-back 2–0 wins Sunday and Monday, and it was clear that heavy pitching and light hitting would not be a sustainable strategy. This proved true in the middle game of the series as Buehler gave up eight runs and the Seattle pitching staff held Boston to just two hits in an 8–0 defeat, dashing any hopes of Boston extending their win streak to seven. Buehler lasted only 3 1/3 innings and finished with a blemished scoreline of eight runs (all earned) on eight hits, four walks and just two strikeouts. The Mariners got to Buehler in the bottom of the 2nd, when they stitched together a five-run inning. The M's began with a Rowdy Tellez single and a Tellez steal of second base followed by a fly out that preceded a Williamson walk. Cole Young then doubled deep to right field to drive in Tellez. Buehler then walked Crawford and Rodríguez in succession to load the bases, and Cal Raleigh turned on a Buehler offering and sent it into the right field seats for a grand slam, at a stroke putting Seattle up 5–0. Buehler induced a Jorge Polanco ground out to get out of the inning, and while he seemed to recover in the bottom of the 3rd, in the bottom 4th he got the hook as Seattle cobbled together three more runs across the first third of the frame. Specifically, Young led off the inning with a right field single, advanced to third on a Crawford single, and then both Crawford and Young scored on a Raleigh double to right. Zack Kelly came on in relief for the Sox at this point, but Raleigh promptly stole third and scored on a sac fly to Polanco – the eighth and final run of the night for the Mariners was also charged to Buehler. In the meantime, Bryan Woo was pitching a seven-inning gem for Seattle, allowing just one hit and fanning six Red Sox hitters while only walking two. Casey Legumina and closer Andrés Muñoz shut Boston down in the 8th and 9th innings, respectively. Marcelo Mayer began the 5th with a single to right, and Nate Eaton, just up from AAA Worcester, recorded a leadoff knock in the 9th, but those were the only hits the Sox would collect all night long, as Devers' absence (he gained his first hit and RBI as a Giant in San Francisco's win over Cleveland) loomed large on this evening. Buehler to a record of 5–5 while Woo improved to 6–4. The Sox, still just a half-game out of a playoff spot (the final berth being held by the Mariners) would look to win the series on Wednesday afternoon with a matchup of two aces – Boston's Garrett Crochet against Seattle's Luis Castillo.

In the Wednesday afternoon rubber game, Garrett Crochet continued his impressive June with another sterling outing to put the Sox in winning position. Crochet delivered six innings of work, and while he scattered six hits, he only gave up one run, he also twirled eight strikeouts and did not surrender any walks. Luis Castillo also went six frames, striking out five, but gave up three earned runs on just three hits and two walks, as the Red Sox continued to make their offensive opportunities count. Marcelo Mayer put Boston on the scoreboard first, with a solo bomb in the top of the 2nd inning, his 4th home run of the season. The Mariners responded in kind in the bottom half of the inning when Randy Arozarena scored from third base on a Crochet wild pitch with Donovan Solano at bat, but that was all the offense Seattle would get on this day. Mayer factored into the Sox' next big play, a 2-run homer from Trevor Story in the top 4th. The dinger to center field was Story's 10th of the year and gave him 12 RBIs in his last eleven games. Roman Anthony walked and stole second base in the 6th inning, his first career swiped bag, and though it came to nothing, it was enough to see Castillo pulled at the end of the 6th. The Mariner bullpen held the Red Sox hitless in the final three innings, but the Boston bullpen was just as strong, surrendering only a walk through three pitchers across three innings. In a somewhat interesting wrinkle, manager Alex Cora opted to put in usual closer Aroldis Chapman in the 8th, having Greg Weissert pitch the 9th in the closer role, but the shakeup did not alter the pitchers' effectiveness, and Weissert converted his third save of the season to give Boston a 3–1 victory and its seventh win in eight games. The team now would get a day off on Thursday before meeting up with recently departed Sox slugger Devers in San Francisco, as the Giants would host the Sox for a weekend series. Hunter Dobbins was scheduled to start on Friday at Oracle Park against San Francisco's Hayden Birdsong.

Red Sox won the series, 2–1 (5–9 runs)

==== June 20–22, at San Francisco Giants ====
The Red Sox found themselves in a bit of an awkward spot as they invaded Oracle Park for a three-game series – just five days removed from the team's stunning trade of Rafael Devers, they would already face their ex-teammate on his new home turf. Devers and the Giants would contend with Boston's Hunter Dobbins while San Francisco rolled out Hayden Birdsong; however, neither starter would earn a decision in a dramatic, back-and-forth contest. San Francisco seemed to have the Sox' number early, tagging Dobbins for a Wilmer Flores knock that scored Mike Yastrzemski in the bottom 1st (Flores reached on a David Hamilton fielding error) and for a Christian Koss RBI groundout and a Yastrzemski RBI single in the bottom 2nd, giving the Giants a 3–0 advantage through two innings. Hamilton redeemed his earlier error in the top 3rd with a 2-run home run to center that brought home Ceddanne Rafaela. In the top 4th, Boston tied the game at 3–3 when Rafaela singled in Wilyer Abreu. Koss struck again for the Giants in the bottom half of the frame, however, delivering another timely RBI ground out, this one scoring Willy Adames, to restore San Francisco to a 4–3 lead. Dobbins was pulled after four innings, having given up four earned runs and four hits while walking five and striking out only one Giant hitter. However, the Red Sox would soon drive Birdsong out of the game as well. In the top 5th, rookie Roman Anthony continued his hot streak with a single to center field that allowed Jarren Duran to cross the plate. Abraham Toro then reached on an error thanks to a Koss fielding error, enabling Anthony to scamper home. Now up 5–4, the Sox tapped Brennan Bernardino to take the hill in relief in the bottom 5th, and Heliot Ramos helped the Giants even the game yet again, scoring on a Wilmer Flores single in which he was ultimately tagged out at second base. In the top of the 6th, the Sox pulled ahead again, as Rafaela cracked his seventh home run of the season, a solo shot to center field that gave Boston a 6–5 lead. The Sox bullpen held the Giants scoreless in the bottom 6th and added an insurance run in the top 7th when Abreu singled home Toro. Trailing 7–5, San Francisco was held off the board in the 7th before creating perhaps the tensest moment of the game in the bottom 8th. Still down a pair and facing the Sox' Garrett Whitlock, the Giants got two men on base in between two outs before Weissert walked Dominic Smith, bringing Yastrzemski to bat. The grandson of Red Sox legend Carl, Mike Yastrzemski worked Weissert to a full count before striking out swinging, leaving the tying run on second base. After being set down quickly in the top 9th, the Sox rolled out Aroldis Chapman in the bottom 9th, and he earned his 14th save of the season by striking out two, including Devers, before inducing a pop out to end the contest. Devers went 0-for-5, leaving three men on base, in his first game against his former team. Meanwhile, Rafaela had one of the best outings of his career, going 3-for-4 with 3 hits, 2 RBIs, and 2 runs, while falling just a triple short of a cycle. Bernardino was credited both the win for the Sox, while Giants reliever Sean Hjelle was saddled with the loss. The Sox would look to win the series in the middle game on Saturday afternoon while pitting Brayan Bello against the Giants' Landen Roupp.

The Sox and Giants had a low-scoring affair in the middle game of the series on Saturday afternoon, with Bello facing Roupp. Roupp in particular handcuffed Boston's bats with no runs on just three hits and three walks along with seven strikeouts in a six-inning outing; Bello also went six, only allowing four hits but giving up three runs, albeit only one of them earned. San Francisco got the scoring started early when, with the count full, he turned on a Bello cutter and sent it exactly 400 feet into the center field stands for a 1–0 Giants lead, his 13th home run of the season. In the bottom 3rd, Andrew Knizner reached base on a fielding error by the Sox' Hamilton, his second error in as many days. Later in the inning, with Knizner still on base, Bello battled Rafael Devers, coming off an 0-for-5 performance in his first game against his former team on Friday night. Bello offered Devers a strike to start the at-bat, but his second pitch – a four-seam fastball – was smoked to the opposite field and over the left field fence for a 2-run jack, Devers' 16th home run of the year and first in the majors to not come in a Boston uniform. This home run would prove to be the difference maker in the final score. Once Roupp left the game after six frames, Boston was similarly puzzled by relievers Randy Rodríguez and Tyler Rogers, each of whom twirled scoreless and hitless innings in the 7th and 8th, respectively. Down 3–0 and facing a shutout at the hands of closer Camilo Doval, the Red Sox did manage to start a rally. Wilyer Abreu continued to perform well in his return from the injured list, scoring Anthony and advancing Story to third base on an RBI single to right field. Nate Eaton then pinch ran for Abreu and stole second base. With the Sox down to their final two outs, Marcelo Mayer put the ball in play for a ground out, but Knizner made a fielding error that allowed Story to scamper home, shaving the Sox deficit to 3–2, and also let Eaton reach third base, putting the game-tying run 90 feet away as Romy González came to the plate to pinch-hit for Connor Wong. Unfortunately for Boston, Doval induced an easy ground ball that ended the game and got Doval out of the jam, his twelfth save of 2025. Roupp got the win while Bello was saddled with the loss. With Boston's offense having been too little, too late in this one, they would enter yet another rubber game on Sunday afternoon with the pitching matchup slated to be Lucas Giolito against Giants veteran Robbie Ray.

Ray and Giolito stared each other down in the rubber game of the series with Boston looking to win their fifth consecutive series, but San Francisco would cruise to a 9–5 victory, giving the Sox their first losing streak since June 2–3. Giolito went six innings and allowed four runs (two earned) on four hits with five strikeouts, while Ray went five innings and struck out seven, but allowed four runs (three earned) on eight hits. The Sox pounced on Ray early in the top 1st when Anthony walked, advanced to second on a Carlos Narváez single, and scored on a Giants error after left fielder Heliot Ramos lost the ball in the sun. However, Story then struck out to end the inning, stranding a pair of baserunners. Down 1–0, the Giants got on the board in the bottom 3rd when Ramos redeemed himself with a 2-RBI single that drove home Patrick Bailey and Casey Schmitt. In the bottom 5th, down 2–1 after three scoreless frames on offense, the Sox jumped on Ray again, courtesy of home runs from both Rob Refsnyder and Romy González – their fifth and second long balls of the year respectively. Refsnyder's blast was a 2-run jack, coming with Nate Eaton on base, and so the three-run inning vaulted the Sox back into the lead by two runs, 4–2. In the bottom of the 5th, however, things would start to go south for the Red Sox. Giolito gave up solo homers to both Bailey and Yastrzemski, almost immediately surrendering Boston's lead. Ceddanne Rafaela continued his hit streak with a solo bomb to left in the top 6th, temporarily restoring the Sox' edge with a 5–4 score, but Boston's scoring was now done for the afternoon, and the Red Sox bullpen would not succeed in keeping San Francisco at bay. The Giants subsequently broke the game open in the bottom 7th in a four-run inning, highlights of which included a Tyler Fitzgerald RBI sac bunt, Schmitt scoring from third base when Yastrzemski reached on an error by González, and a 2-RBI Ramos double that scored Yastrzemski and ex-Sox Rafael Devers. In the bottom 8th, Willy Adames punctuated the victory with a crack to left field off Zack Kelly to give San Francisco another insurance run. Randy Rodríguez set the Sox down in the top 9th to shut the door on a 9–5 Giants win. Having gotten a fair day of hitting, but needing better relief pitching and more responsible fielding, Boston would head down to Orange County to finish their road trip with a three-game set against the Los Angeles Angels, who took two of three from the Sox at Fenway earlier in the month. Walker Buehler was slated to take the mound in Monday's game one against Angels hurler Jack Kochanowicz.

Red Sox lost the series, 1–2 (14–17 runs)

==== June 23–25, at Los Angeles Angels ====
The Red Sox slid into Anaheim for the final series of their nine-game road trip and lost their third consecutive game by a score of 9–5. Although Boston kept the Angels off the scoreboard from innings 2 through 7, Los Angeles bookended their scoring with two big, back-breaking frames that showcased the Sox' pitching woes in both starting and relieving. Walker Buehler's inconsistency continued with a four-inning outing in which he surrendered five earned runs on just three hits, but allowed seven walks. Jack Kochanowicz, the Angels' starter, went five innings and allowed four runs on six hits, striking out just one Boston batter – but the Angels' bullpen would pick up the slack by striking out a combined nine Sox, especially in key offensive situations. The Red Sox appeared to get off to a good start with a three-run top of the 1st which included a Wilyer Abreu 2-RBI infield hit (Roman Anthony, Abraham Toro scored) and a Ceddanne Rafaela RBI single (Trevor Story scored). In the bottom of the 1st, though, the Angels flexed their offensive muscles with a 5-run frame, one that felt eerily reminiscent of a 6-run 1st inning that the Angels had cobbled together at Fenway on June 2. Zach Neto began the offense with a solo home run to center field, and Jo Adell hit an RBI single to score Mike Trout. With the bases loaded, Luis Rengifo tied the game by drawing one of Buehler's many walks, as Taylor Ward jogged home. Christian Moore then walked in Adell to give L.A. their first lead of the game, 4–3. Having batted around, Neto came to the dish with the bases still juiced and was hit by a pitch, giving the Angels a 5–3 lead as LaMonte Wade Jr. took home plate. In the top of the 4th, Connor Wong hit into an RBI sacrifice fly that gave Rafaela enough time to score, giving the Sox one of their runs back, and Boston tied the game at 5–5 in the top 6th when Trevor Story turned on a Ryan Zeferjahn pitch and smoked it over the left field fence for his 12th home run of the season. Perhaps the most consequential - and demoralizing – inning for the Red Sox, however, came in the 7th, when Boston shook up Angels reliever Brock Burke. Wong began the inning with a single to left, and David Hamilton reached on a bloop into the shallow infield to advance Wong to second. Jarren Duran then laid down a shrewdly placed sacrifice bunt to advance the runners, allowing the go-ahead run to hold court just 90 feet away with only one out. At this point, however, Burke got the hook and was relieved by Reid Detmers. Romy González pinch-hit for Toro and was intentionally walked, bringing rookie sensation Anthony to the plate. Detmers, however, was locked in, and he struck out both Anthony and Story swinging, making them look silly as they appeared to be aiming for the fences. Having left the bases loaded, a discouraged Sox club made it through the bottom 7th but could not generate offense in the top 8th, and the Angels then broke the game completely open in the bottom 8th with a 4-run frame against Sox reliever Garrett Whitlock. The Angels took the lead on a Moore sac fly that scored Wade Jr.; with the bases loaded yet again for Los Angeles, Taylor Ward drew a walk to score Rengifo; and Travis d'Arnaud capped the inning with a 2-RBI single to left field that scored both Trout and Neto. The Sox appeared to potentially catch a break in the bottom 9th when talented closer (and ex-Sox) Kenley Jansen left the game in some discomfort after just four pitches. However, Hector Neris picked up the 2–2 count to Connor Wong and worked it into a ground out, and then struck out Hamilton and Duran swinging to mercifully end the game. Boston would try to flush this loss and get back in the win column Tuesday with ace Garrett Crochet set to face the Angels' Tyler Anderson.

Still reeling from their 9–5 loss in the opener, the Red Sox looked to rebound as Crochet took the mound in the middle game of the series determined to get the Sox a victory. Crochet did certainly put Boston on his back with a sterling outing, hurling seven innings of scoreless ball, surrendering just three hits and three walks while striking out ten Angel batters. Tyler Anderson had a nice performance as well, striking out five Red Sox and only giving up one run and two hits, but he was limited to 4 2/3 innings. On offense, the Sox bats continued to struggle providing Crochet with run support, though they did take a 1–0 lead in the top of the 3rd inning when Nate Eaton hit a sacrifice fly that scored Marcelo Mayer. However, Boston struck out 9 times and left a total of seven men on base. Once Crochet left the game after seven frames, Greg Weissert came on in the bottom of the 8th and gave up a one-out, solo home run from Christian Moore, who turned on an 0–1 Weissert fastball and launched it 387 feet into the left field seats. In the top 9th, the Red Sox appeared to get off to a good start against L.A. closer Kenley Jansen, as Romy González reached first on a Neto fielding error and then swiped second base. Carlos Narváez flied out, but Duran worked a walk to put runners on first and second with one out. Jansen got out of the jam, however, by inducing a Story pop out and a Rafaela fly out. Having missed a great chance to push a run across, it was up to Aroldis Chapman to force extra innings, which he did by striking out Ward, Logan O'Hoppe, and Scott Kingery. In the top of the 10th, Detmers took over on the mound for the Angels while Rafaela was placed on second base as the extra inning ghost runner. Mayer promptly smoked a Detmers pitch up the metal to give the Red Sox a 2–1 advantage, but Hamilton grounded into a double play, and after an Abreu single, Roman Anthony struck out looking to end the inning. Justin Wilson took over to pitch the bottom 10th in a crucial save situation, but the win was not to be on this night. With Kingery on second base as the ghost runner, Wilson struck out LaMonte Wade Jr. but then gave up a rocket of a line drive to Christian Moore, who had provided the Angels' lone run earlier in the game. The ball bounced off the wall and skipped past Rafaela in right, and it appeared as though Moore had not only scored Wade Jr. but had eked out a triple, sprinting all the way to third base. However, upon further review, it was determined the baseball actually bounced off the top of the right field wall over the yellow line before bouncing back onto the field, and the umpiring crew ruled it a home run, meaning Moore got to cross the plate as the winning run. Moore's second shot of the game marked a heartbreaking loss for Boston as their losing streak expanded to four games, and as their extra-inning record on the road dropped to 0–6. The Sox' number of one-run losses also crept up to an inexcusable nineteen on the year, behind only the Chicago White Sox. Boston would again have to trash this loss quickly and look to salvage the Angels series with a victory in the final game on Wednesday; Richard Fitts was set to start against the Angels' Yusei Kikuchi.

Fitts was given a short leash in the finale of the Red Sox' series in Anaheim, and though the Alabama product struck out six Angels batters, he also let in two runs on four hits and was pulled after just four innings. Kikuchi, meanwhile, was absolutely dealing for the Angels, as the Sox' offensive woes continued, their batters handcuffed by a total of twelve Kikuchi strikeouts. The Japanese import allowed only two runs on three hits. As with so many other games this season, Boston provided false hope by getting off to a good offensive start in the 1st inning – Duran reached on a Kingery fielding error, González singled to right field to advance Duran to third, and Story cashed in with a single to left off Kikuchi to push both runners across, handing the Sox an early 2–0 lead. Fitts kept the Angels scoreless through three innings, but in the fourth the starter gave up back-to-back long balls – both solo shots – that resulted in a tie game. Firstly, Adell – a real thorn in Boston's side this series (four hits and 3 RBI) – made contact with a Fitts slider and deposited it 433 feet into the left field seats. Not one batter later, Fitts faced Travis d'Arnaud, who rocketed the first pitch of the at-bat over the wall in right center. In the bottom 5th, with the score still tied, and Luis Guerrero on the bump for Boston, Adell and d'Arnaud struck again, this time by virtue of an Adell RBI single that scored Moore (he of two home runs in the Tuesday night game), and d'Arnaud single to left that allowed Trout to scamper home. In the bottom 6th, Trout closed the afternoon's scoring with an RBI single of his own, a blooper to right field on which Luis Rengifo jogged to the plate for a 5–2 Angels advantage. With Kikuchi pulled from the game, reliever Ryan Zeferjahn entered and pulled off a two-inning save, his second of the season, allowing only a Roman Anthony walk in the top 8th and putting down the Sox in order in the top 9th.

Red Sox lost the series, 0–3 (9–17 runs)

==== June 27–29, vs Toronto Blue Jays ====
The Red Sox entered a weekend series with the Blue Jays reeling from a five-game losing streak to end their West Coast road swing, and they returned to Fenway Park without the services of Rafael Devers. Brayan Bello made the start for the Sox against the Toronto, with the Jays sending to the mound José Berríos, a pitcher with a history of inflicting damage on Boston bats. For Berríos, Friday night would turn out to be no different, as the Puerto Rican allowed just four hits and yielded no runs across seven innings of work while striking out eight Red Sox hitters. Bello lasted six innings but only struck out while allowing three runs on eight hits and a trio of walks. Marcelo Mayer was added to the bereavement list ahead of the game, and his absence left another hole in the batting order, one filled by AAA Worcester call-up Nick Sogard, who went 0-for-3. Then again, there would be little use pointing fingers – between Berríos's masterclass and two strong relief innings from the Toronto pen, this game would be a shutout from the Jays, with the Sox only producing six baserunners in total. Toronto began their scoring right away, with George Springer singling home Vladimir Guerrero Jr.. Bo Bichette singled up the middle in the 2nd to score Ernie Clement, and Clement also went up the middle in the 3rd to let Springer scamper home for a 3–0 deal. Bello kept the Jays off the scoresheet in innings 4 through 6, but in the top of the 7th, with the embattled Boston bullpen having taken the reins, the Jays expanded their lead to 5–0: Alejandro Kirk doubled to left with two men aboard to bring home Addison Barger while advancing Guerrero Jr. to third base. After intentionally walking Clement, reliever Brennan Bernardino promptly walked Andrés Giménez with the bases juiced, enabling Guerrero to take home. In the top of the 8th, Toronto summarily broke the game open with a 4-run frame: Springer singled with the bases loaded to force home Barger; Myles Straw hit the ball deep enough for a sacrifice fly to score Guerrero Jr.; and Giménez blasted a 2-RBI single up the middle as Springer and Kirk each scurried home. With Berríos out of the game, Nick Sandlin and Paxton Schultz worked the 8th and 9th, respectively, and shut down the Sox for good (Sandlin allowed only one walk and no hits; Schultz had a one-two-three 9th.

Having scored just 16 runs over the course of their six-game losing streak, the Red Sox entered a Saturday matchup with the Blue Jays aiming to get the bats cracking – and gave the Fenway faithful an early fireworks display in the process, pushing across in one game almost all the runs they had mustered in their previous six, earning a 15–1 win to mercifully reinhabit the win column. Lucas Giolito also had a fine performance, continuing to improve from his early struggles by hurling seven innings of one-run ball while allowing six hits and one walk and fanning five Toronto hitters. On the pitching side, there was another feel-good story for Boston: reliever Chris Murphy made his 2025 debut and pitched two scoreless innings in his first major league appearance since 2023; Murphy had missed the entire 2024 campaign rehabbing from Tommy John surgery. But it was the bats that made the money for the Sox on this day, starting with Wilyer Abreu, who got things going in the bottom 1st with a 3-run home run into the right field seats, bringing Carlos Narváez and Abraham Toro home with him. Abreu struck again against Blue Jays starter Chris Bassitt just an inning later, his RBI double to right scoring Roman Anthony. Trevor Story then bloop-singled to right to bring home Toro. In the top 3rd, Toronto squeaked across what would prove to be their only run – a Barger RBI double – but the Sox answered again in the bottom 3rd, loading the bases before Bassitt walked Toro to plate run number six. Narváez then scored Jarren Duran on a sacrifice fly, and Anthony scored from third on a Kirk fielding error. Up 9–0 with three runs in each of their first three turns at bat, the Sox settled down briefly in the 4th and 5th before delivering another three runs in the 6th, as Nick Sogard singled in Story and Ceddanne Rafaela crushed a pitch over the Monster for his 9th home run of the season, scoring himself and Sogard for a 12–1 Boston advantage. Romy González got in on the fun in the 7th with a 2-run jack of his own with Narváez on base, and Toro gave the Sox their final bow in the 8th with a sac fly to score Duran, completing the eventual 15–1 final score. Giolito improved to 4–1 on the season as Bassitt fell to 7–4.

Boston entered the rubber game of their weekend series looking to keep their bats hot and give struggling pitcher Walker Buehler some run support, and while the Sox scattered seven hits across 4 1/3 innings from the Blue Jays' Eric Lauer, tagging him for three earned runs, Buehler barely managed to tread water against Toronto, coughing up four earned runs on four hits and three walks through just four innings of work, striking out four. Buehler toiled from the beginning, giving up solo bombs on consecutive pitches: first, Addison Barger took a Buehler slider and deposited it 404 feet into the right field seats; one pitch later, Vladimir Guerrero Jr. jumped on a cutter and dumped it 387 feet away, also in right. Briefly, it appeared that the Red Sox had it in them to fight back and make this a contentious game, as in the bottom 2nd Carlos Narváez hit a solo shot of his own, taking Lauer deep with a 337-foot right field jack, and Ceddanne Rafaela doubled to deep left center to score Trevor Story, tying the game. The top of the 4th was where the game would turn in Toronto's favor, as Buehler found himself in a jam he could not recover from. Although the inning began encouragingly when Guerrero Jr.'s would-be line drive landed in the glove of Rafaela, who raced to make a beautifully athletic full-extension diving catch for the first out, and George Springer then grounded out for the second out, a Nathan Lukes infield single kept the frame alive. Buehler than walked Ernie Clement and allowed an Andrés Gímenez single to right field, advancing Clement all the way to third base and scoring Lukes. With Jonatan Clase at bat, Gímenez stole second base before putting Clase on first with another walk. With the bases loaded and nowhere to put Tyler Heineman, Buehler walked Heineman, forcing home the Jays' fourth run of the afternoon. Buehler mercifully prevented further damage by picking off Heineman at first base. The Jays were not done with Boston's pitching, however, as Lukes tagged reliever Zack Kelly for an RBI single to make it a 5–2 contest. Romy González doubled home Eric Sogard in the bottom 5th to get the Red Sox back within a pair, but Toronto's bullpen only gave up a single hit and struck out five Sox batters, culminating in a Jeff Hoffman save when the Blue Jays closer struck out the side in the bottom 9th.

Red Sox lost the series, 1–2 (18–15 runs)

==== June 30, vs Cincinnati Reds ====
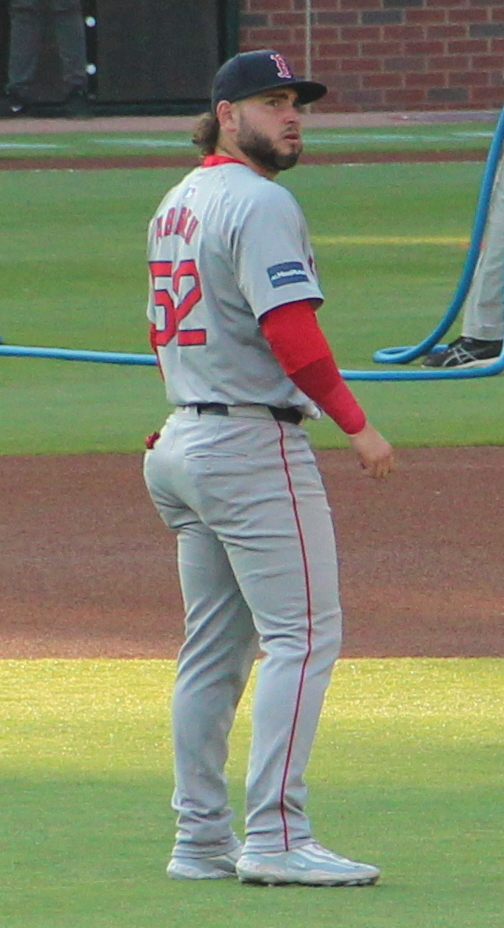
Wilyer Abreu sent Fenway into a frenzy on June 30, the opener of the Red Sox' series against the Cincinnati Reds, by hustling for an inside-the-park home run and then blasting a grand slam, only the sixth time in major league history that such endeavors had been achieved by the same player in the same game.

The Red Sox opened a three-game interleague series against the Cincinnati Reds and ex-Sox World Series-winning manager Terry Francona with ace Garrett Crochet on the mound pitching opposite the Reds' Chase Burns. Although Crochet did not have his best performance, allowing four runs on seven hits in six innings pitched, Crochet was bailed out by Boston's offense, particularly that of Wilyer Abreu, who had a massive game at the dish. The Sox also started out fast with a 7-run inning in the bottom of the 1st. Abraham Toro set things in motion with an RBI single to left to score Jarren Duran, and Carlos Narváez continued to be one of the Red Sox' best offensive contributors with a double to deep center to score rookie Roman Anthony. Trevor Story then took a struggling Burns deep for his 12th home run of the season, a 3-run shot with Narváez and Toro aboard that gave Boston a 5–0 advantage. David Hamilton singled in Marcelo Mayer, and, with Burns already out of the game, having not lasted beyond one-third of one inning, Anthony singled to right to allow Ceddanne Rafaela to jog home. After the Cincinnati bullpen – deployed in the first – got out of the jam, Boston's bats quieted and Cincinnati eventually began to press. The Reds got a 3-run frame in the top 4th (an Austin Hays 2-RBI triple and a Spencer Steer RBI ground out) and pushed home a run in the top 5th (a Matt McLain RBI single) to narrow the game to a 7–4 score with plenty of racetrack left. However, in the bottom 5th, Wilyer Abreu's memorable night began. Abreu led off the inning by turning on a Joe La Sorsa fastball and launching it toward the center field gap in the deepest part of Fenway Park, near the 420' sign. Abreu briefly admired the ball, thinking it was out of the park, but the ball took an awkward bounce off the wall and Abreu was forced to run – and run he did. As the errant baseball eluded Cincinnati outfielders, Abreu not only reached third base but was waved home, sliding home before any Reds fielder could even manage a throw to home. With this incredible inside-the-park home run in the books, Boston now led 8–4. The inside-the-parker counted as Abreu's 16th home run of the season. In the top 6th, the Reds got the Abreu run back with a Hays solo home run, and Tyler Stephenson walked to put the potential tying run in the on-deck circle. Crochet got out of the jam, however, to finish his evening. In the bottom 6th, Boston nabbed an insurance run when Jarren Duran cracked a solo homer to right field, giving the Sox a 9–5 lead. In the bottom 8th, Abreu stepped to the plate with the bases loaded, Rafaela having doubled and Jarren Duran and Toro having walked. Not intent on leaving the bases juiced, Abreu demolished a Connor Phillips fastball 408 feet into the bleachers to blow the game open with his first career grand slam, in the process making history by becoming just the sixth player in major league history to hit an inside-the-park home run and a grand slam in the same game. Abreu also became the first Red Sox player to hit an inside-the-park home run and a conventional home run (of any kind) in 21 years (Pokey Reese in 2004). Cincinnati eked out one more run in the top 9th, but the Sox otherwise put this game away without incident, a 13–6 victory.

Series won 1–0, continued into following month

=== July ===
July game summaries

==== July 1–2, vs. Cincinnati Reds ====
Opening the month of July looking to turn their season around after ending a mediocre June with an explosion of offensive power, the Red Sox continued their Cincinnati Reds series with the middle game scheduled for Tuesday, July 1. Spot starter Richard Fitts was scheduled to go up against Reds starter (and ex-Royals ace) Brady Singer. Fitts got off to a nice start in the top 1st, walking TJ Friedl but then retiring the next three batters he faced. The Red Sox again got their offense cracking in the bottom of the 1st, as Jarren Duran doubled and raced home to score when struggling rookie Roman Anthony got off the schneid with an RBI double of his own. An Abraham Toro fly out advanced Anthony to third base, and Anthony scored on a Carlos Narváez RBI single, giving Boston a 2–0 advantage. The 2nd inning was scoreless, but Cincinnati halved the lead in the top 2nd via a Matt McLain RBI ground out that enabled Will Benson to score.

Thunderstorms had been circling around Fenway Park since the game began, and after the third inning concluded, with the score 2–1 in favor of Boston, the game was officially suspended as the city settled in for an expected long night of rain. The Red Sox announced on social media that the game would resume in the top of the 4th inning at 2:30 p.m. on Wednesday afternoon, with the series finale to follow in the evening.

The Red Sox and Reds awoke to an overcast and muggy, but most importantly dry, day on Wednesday and the suspended game proceeded as scheduled. Brayan Bello, originally scheduled to start the evening contest for Boston, was tapped to take over for Fitts. Spencer Steer jumped on Bello early in the resumed game, his 2-run home run to left field with Gavin Lux aboard instantly turning a 2–1 Boston lead into a 3–2 Cincinnati advantage. Bello settled down in subsequent innings, however, and he turned a flawless outing, while not a "traditional" start, of five innings and just two earned runs on one hit (Steer's bomb) and one walk with three strikeouts. The fact that Bello "started" with the game already in the fourth meant that his five-inning performance would build a bridge straight to closer Aroldis Chapman – if the Sox could retake the lead. In the bottom of the 6th, the Sox tied the game at 3–3 when Narváez lifted a sacrifice fly ball deep enough to score baserunner Abraham Toro. In the bottom 8th, Boston added insurance with a 2-run inning, as Wilyer Abreu provided an RBI single to score Nate Eaton and Trevor Story blasted an RBI double to deep center field. While Story was tagged out at third base trying to stretch the double into a triple, he still managed to score Abreu, putting Boston up 5–3. And when Chapman came on, he was his usual unflappable self, setting down the Reds in order to secure the victory and earn his 15th save of the year.

In the evening, the Sox needed a new starting pitcher to take Bello's place after he twirled a masterclass in the resumption of the Tuesday game. Alex Cora opted to utilize the bullpen's rest in the afternoon to his advantage and cobbled together a bullpen game, with Brennan Bernardino getting the official "start", though he only hurled 1 2/3 innings. Cincinnati went with a conventional starting pitcher in Nick Martinez, who posted a line of four earned runs on nine hits and just two strikeouts across 6 2/3 innings. Boston got on the board in the bottom of the 2nd when Romy González hit a sacrifice fly deep enough to enable Ceddanne Rafaela to scamper home. Martinez then mostly handcuffed the Boston bats until the 6th, when Story singled to center field and then scored when Wilyer Abreu turned on a Martinez changeup and sent it 388 feet into the right field seats for a 2-run round-tripper, his team leading 17th home run. The long ball gave the Sox a 3–0 lead, but big things were in store for Cincinnati in the 7th. With Greg Weissert pitching, the Reds loaded the bases on a Tyler Stephenson single, a Rece Hinds fielder's choice which enabled Stephenson to advance to second base on a Toro fielding error, and a Gavin Lux walk. With nowhere to put young Reds star Christian Encarnacion-Strand, the first baseman came to the plate and absolutely hammered a Weissert fastball, depositing it over the Green Monster for a 439-foot grand slam. At once putting Cincinnati up 4–3, the bomb was Encarnacion-Strand's sixth of the year and his first career grand slam. The misery was not over for Weissert, however, who remained in the game as TJ Friedl doubled and was brought home to score on an RBI single from Elly de la Cruz. Only then did Jordan Hicks relieve Weissert, ending the inning on his first batter faced. Down 5–3, Boston briefly came back to life in the bottom 7th with a González RBI double that scored Marcelo Mayer that put the Sox back within a run. But Hicks had struggles of his own in the top of the 8th, immediately loading the bases of his own accord and allowing Santiago Espinal to single to right field to force home Hinds, putting Cincy up 6–4. Friedl then hit into a force out at shortstop, but Friedl reached base and a Story fielding error enabled Lux and Encarnacion-Strand to both score, breaking the game open with an 8–4 score as boos rained down from the Fenway faithful. Hicks, one of the pitchers the Sox received from San Francisco as part of a package in the June 15 Rafael Devers trade, was tagged for three runs on three hits while recording just two outs; Cooper Criswell relieved Hicks and mercifully pitched the remainder of the game without incident, but the Red Sox similarly were shut down at the plate in the bottom 8th and bottom 9th, handing the Reds the victory to salvage the series.

Red Sox won the series, 2–1 (22–17 runs)

==== July 4–6, at Washington Nationals ====
On the Fourth of July, the Red Sox found themselves in the nation's capital facing the Nationals and a traditional 11 a.m. start for the holiday in D.C. On this day, however, it was the Nationals who would appear groggy and the Red Sox who would look wide awake and unshaken by the early start. Lucas Giolito went for the Sox against Michael Soroka, and had an excellent outing, giving up just one run on four hits through 7 2/3 innings and fanning seven Washington hitters. Soroka, meanwhile, would give up seven runs on nine hits in just four innings of work as the Red Sox' offense came alive, their bats providing (no pun intended) fireworks. After a scoreless 1st, Boston got on the board with a Ceddanne Rafaela RBI double and a Jarren Duran RBI single in the top of the 2nd, giving the Sox a 2–0 lead. Giolito and Soroka dueled each other through the 3rd and 4th innings, keeping the score the same, until Soroka began to melt in the midst of an offensive onslaught from the Red Sox in the top 5th. The inning began with Soroka allowing a double from rookie Roman Anthony and walking Abraham Toro. Carlos Narváez then singled to advance both runners and load the bases. Still having not recorded an out, Soroka then walked Wilyer Abreu, scoring Anthony. Trevor Story then singled to center field, advancing Abreu to third while allowing both Narváez and Toro to jog home, putting Boston up 5–0. Soroka was summarily relieved by Zach Brzykcy, who immediately gave up a single to Marcelo Mayer, keeping the line moving as Story advanced to second and Abreu scored for a 6–0 Boston advantage. Brzykcy then got the first two outs of the inning, but could not escape more damage from the Sox as Duran laced a 2-RBI double to deep center field, scoring both Mayer and Story and putting Boston up 8–0. Yet more run-scoring was in the works when Anthony, batting for the second time in the inning, drew a walk and Toro singled to drive in Duran, putting Boston up 9–0 and completing a 7-run frame for the Sox, breaking this game wide open. The Nationals avoided the shutout when Luis García Jr. scored CJ Abrams on a sacrifice fly, but the Sox piled on more in the 8th when Story hit a 2-run bomb to left with Abreu on base to take an 11–1 lead. Daylen Lile's RBI double in the bottom 9th put the final score at 11–2 in favor of the Red Sox, but the most that could be said for the Lile hit was that it helped Washington avoid losing by ten runs. Having started this weekend series off right with a big win on the holiday (the 9,999th in franchise history), the Red Sox would hope to bring these hot bats into Saturday with Walker Buehler, still looking to turn things around, scheduled to start against the Nationals' Mitchell Parker.

The Red Sox cruised into Saturday's middle game of the series looking to get back to the .500 mark while also notching the 10,000th win in the history of their vaunted franchise. Two critical things happened to help the Sox achieve this goal: Walker Buehler got off the schneid with a quality start, and the Sox gave him run support to work with. Buehler, he of the 6.45 ERA headed into this game, pitched five innings and scattered eight Washington hits, but only allowed three runs (two earned). The ex-Dodger only struck out two batters but also surrendered no walks. The Boston bats, meanwhile, got going in defense of Buehler early. In the top of the 1st, Romy González hit an RBI double to drive in baserunner Nate Eaton and Rob Refsnyder smoked a double of his own to deep left center to drive home González, giving Buehler a two-run lead before he even took the mound. In the top of the 3rd, the Boston bats really got going with another round of holiday weekend fireworks, producing a 7-run inning for the second consecutive game. The runs scored thusly: Anthony singled to right field to score González; Duran sent the ball deep to right center and eked out a triple, scoring Story and Refsnyder; pitcher Mitchell Parker committed a fielding error that allowed Abraham Toro to reach base and Duran to score; Ceddanne Rafaela turned on a Parker pitch and sent it over the left field fence for a 2-run home run, his tenth blast of the season; and González singled to right field, scoring Eaton. Now up 9–0, the Sox found themselves wholly in command of the game after just three turns at bat. The Nationals had a few attempts to rough up offense against the embattled Buehler (a García RBI groundout that scored Abrams in the bottom 3rd; a Keibert Ruiz RBI fielder's choice in the 4th that enabled Nathaniel Lowe to scamper home; a Josh Bell RBI single in the 6th that also scored Lowe), but Washington never seemed able to frustrate Buehler enough to hang a crooked number on the board, and Boston's bullpen strung together an enviable afternoon from relievers Greg Weissert, Brennan Bernardino, and Jorge Alcala as they combined to allow just one baserunner across four innings of work. With a 9–3 win and their 10,000th victory in their pockets, the Red Sox would look to break out the brooms and get over .500 with a win in the Sunday finale. Burgeoning ace Garrett Crochet was set to toe the rubber opposite a Washington starter set to make his major league debut, Japanese hurler Shinnosuke Ogasawara.

The series finale between Boston and Washington was a much closer affair than the first two contests. Although Boston jumped all over the rookie pitcher Ogasawara in his major league debut, the Nationals would seize opportunities to make the game close. The Red Sox got a fine outing from Crochet, though his performance was a little subpar compared to what Sox fans had come to expect from the ace – he only pitched five innings, on the low end when contrasted with most of his 2025 outings, and the Mississippi native was tagged for nine hits, though the Nats' propensity to leave runners on base meant that Crochet was only tagged for two runs, and he struck out seven hitters. Ogasawara's debut scoreline consisted of four earned runs on seven hits with two strikeouts in 2 2/3 innings. Ogasawara showed jitters early, allowing a 4-run top 1st from the Sox, who got an RBI single from Roman Anthony, an RBI double from Abraham Toro, and Trevor Story's 14th home run of the season - a slider that Story dumped 429 feet into the left field seats, continuing an 8-game hitting streak. In the bottom 3rd, Washington cut the Sox' lead in half by tagging Crochet for a Paul DeJong RBI double that scored Amed Rosario and a Brady House RBI single that scored DeJong, putting Boston's lead at 4–2. After a scoreless 4th, 5th, and 6th, the Sox picked up an insurance run when Ceddanne Rafaela jogged home on a Romy González sac fly. In the bottom half of the inning, however, Greg Weissert walked Luis García Jr. with the bases loaded to force home the Nationals' fourth run of the game. Their lead again cut to two, Boston got their insurance run back in the top 9th when Rafaela launched a solo home run to center field off of reliever Andrew Chafin. Jordan Hicks jogged out to the mound for Boston in the bottom 9th, working closer duty, and though he allowed a run with two outs (Daylen Lile singled to right field to score House from first), the ex-Giant recovered to retire CJ Abrams and seal a 6–4 Boston victory, securing a sweep of the Sox' trip to the nation's capital. Riding a three-game win streak and having won five of their last six contests, Boston would look to make the most of their last homestand before the All-Star Break, which would start with a three-game visit from baseball's worst team, the Colorado Rockies. Richard Fitts was slated to get the start for the Red Sox at Fenway on Monday opposite the Rockies' Austin Gomber.

Red Sox won the series, 3–0 (25–11 runs)

==== July 7–9, vs. Colorado Rockies ====
The Red Sox returned home looking to extend their hot streak, and the schedule gave them just the perfect opponent against which to do so: MLB's worst team in the Rockies. Boston put Richard Fitts on the mound against Colorado and faced the Rockies’ Austin Gomber. Fitts lasted 5 2/3 innings while giving up three runs (two earned) on just five hits and one walk while striking out six Colorado hitters. Gomber, meanwhile, gave up five runs (four earned) on seven hits and a walk while fanning five Red Sox in 4 2/3 innings of work. Colorado got on the board first, scoring in the top 2nd when Brenton Doyle's RBI single drove in Thairo Estrada. Down 1–0, the Sox responded quickly in the bottom 2nd with Wilyer Abreu doubling to score Trevor Story and Abraham Toro hustling to second for a double on a hit to shallow right that scored Carlos Narváez and Abreu. Now up 3–1, Fitts settled in and held the Rockies scoreless in the top 3rd, 4th, and 5th, while Gomber also kept Boston off the board in the 3rd and 4th. In the bottom of the 5th, rookie Roman Anthony came to the plate and tagged Gomber for his second career major league home run (and his first at Fenway), a 418-foot blast to center field that followed a Romy González triple, giving the Sox a 5–1 advantage. In the top 6th, Colorado pushed across two runs (a Michael Toglia RBI fielder's choice; a Ryan McMahon RBI single) to pull back within a pair. However, the Sox put the game away late against the Colorado bullpen with two-run frames in both the 7th (a Jarren Duran RBI single and a Narváez RBI single) and 8th (solo home runs from both Ceddanne Rafaela – who ripped a fastball 407 feet over the Green Monster – and González, who annihilated a curveball and dumped it 454 feet, beyond right center field). Boston got a two-hit outing from their bullpen to shut down Colorado in the late innings and secure a 9–3 victory, their fourth consecutive win and sixth in their last seven games, putting them two games above .500.

Looking to feast further on the Rockies (who with the defeat amassed their 70th loss in just 91 games), Boston would send Brayan Bello to the hill on Tuesday to start the middle game of the series opposite Colorado's Kyle Freeland. The offense started off slow on both sides, with no runs being scored between the two teams through the first five innings of play. However, in the bottom of the 6th, with Romy González on second and Roman Anthony on first, Trevor Story hit a blooper into right field to score González and move Anthony to third, and with a fielder's choice, Story himself would find himself on second in scoring position. Colorado would turn to their bullpen to try and exit the inning, but it would not be successful, as Juan Mejía would give up a two RBI double to Cedanne Rafaela. The next batter, Jarren Duran, would drive in Rafaela to quickly give the Red Sox a 4–0 lead. Although the Rockies got out of the inning without further damage, Bello would continue to pitch excellently against the weak Colorado lineup, facing only three batters in the top of the 7th despite leading off the inning by hitting Mickey Moniak. In the bottom of the 7th, Boston would continue its offensive surge. After Marcelo Mayer singled with one out, González would triple to score him. The next two batters, Anthony and Rob Refsnyder, would single and walk, respectively, and Story would cap it off with a three-run home run for his fourth RBI of the game. After another Rockies pitching change, Zach Agnos would strike out Rafaela before giving up a solo home run to Duran, who hammered the ball 456 feet for the longest home run at Fenway Park this season thus far. Bello would carry a no-hitter into the 8th inning, however, after a quick first out, Rockies outfielder Brenton Doyle would end the no-hit bid with a single. Bello would be unfazed however, as he would retire the next two batters. After a 1-2-3 bottom of the 8th, Bello entered the 9th inning looking to earn his first ever complete game and shutout of his career. Also at 87 pitches, he was in contention for the Maddux. Unfortunately for Bello, the shutout and Maddux bid would end after letting up a leadoff single to Tyler Freeman and then a two-run home run to Hunter Goodman. Bello would then retire three of the next four batters, earning his first career complete game, amassing ten strikeouts while giving up five hits and only walking one. The 10–2 win gave the Red Sox their fifth consecutive victory, and their seventh in their past eight contests. Boston would look for the sweep against the hapless Rox on Wednesday night with Lucas Giolito looking to continue his recent success pitching opposite the Rockies' Antonio Senzatela.

The Red Sox looked to complete their second straight series sweep going into the series finale against the Rockies, and they were able to attempt to do so with Masataka Yoshida making his long-awaited return, starting at designated hitter for his season debut. The Red Sox seemed poised to continue their recent success in the first inning in the series finale, as Jarren Duran led off the Red Sox by reaching third base on a double and an error, and Roman Anthony would get hit by a pitch, leaving runners on the corners with no outs. Unfortunately, however, a Trevor Story strikeout and a Wilyer Abreu double play would quickly put an end to a promising inning. Giolito would continue his recent pitching success, going 1-2-3 in the second, and he was rewarded with run support when Carlos Narváez led off the bottom of the 2nd with his eighth home run of the season to put Boston up 1–0. The following at-bat, Yoshida earned his first hit of the season in his first at-bat, although the Red Sox would get three straight outs thereafter. After a quiet 3rd inning, the Rockies threatened to score when Tyler Freeman attempted to score from first on a Michael Toglia double, however, a relay shot down the opportunity at home plate, ending the inning. After a Narváez double in the bottom of the 4th, Yoshida earned his first RBI of the season on his second hit of the game, and the season. Giolito continued to hold the Rockies scoreless, and the Red Sox continued to add to their lead with a 2-run Abreu home run in the bottom of the 5th. In the bottom of the 6th, David Hamilton decided to join the hit party with an RBI single to make it 5–0. Giolito's night ended after the 6th, ending his line with six scoreless innings and six strikeouts. Newcomer Jorge Alcalá continued his success in a Red Sox uniform, putting down the Rockies in 1-2-3 fashion in the top of 7th. In the top of the 8th, Isaiah Campbell, who had been called up from the Worcester Red Sox the day prior, gave up a two-run home run to Kyle Farmer to break the shutout. However, he got out of the inning afterwards, and the Red Sox bats did their thing again in the bottom of the 8th, with Romy González hitting a two-run home run and Duran hitting a three-run home run to open the game up to 10–2. González's hit made it so that every starter in the Red Sox lineup earned a hit on the night. Campbell stayed out for the ninth and finished out the game, giving Boston their second straight series sweep, their sixth consecutive win, and eighth in the past nine games. Boston would welcome the Tampa Bay Rays to Fenway the following night, hoping to make gains on them in the AL East race.

Red Sox won the series, 3–0 (29–7 runs)

==== July 10–13, vs. Tampa Bay Rays ====
After three consecutive series against National League opponents, Tampa Bay came to Fenway at an opportune time for the Red Sox – Boston would look to extend their win streak to seven or more while also swiping valuable games from a division rival. The Sox sent Walker Buehler to the hill to start opposite the Rays’ Taj Bradley. However, neither starter would earn a decision in this contest. Buehler kept the Rays off the board in the 1st and 2nd innings, and Boston broke a scoreless tie in the bottom 3rd when Ceddanne Rafaela singled to center and then ran all the way home on a Roman Anthony RBI single to give the Sox a 1–0 advantage. The Rays would respond right away, however, shaking up Buehler in the top 4th. Josh Lowe drew a walk from Buehler and Ha-Seong Kim worked a 3–2 count into a 2-run home run, turning on a Buehler slider and depositing it 389 feet over the Green Monster to give Tampa Bay the lead with one swing of the bat. After a scoreless 5th, the Rays added to their lead in the top 6th when Junior Caminero swatted at a first-pitch cut fastball from Buehler and raked it 384 feet, also into the Monster seats. After six innings pitched, Buehler was pulled, his final scoreline coming out to three earned runs on five hits with three walks and just a pair of strikeouts. While it was an improvement over some of Buehler's outings earlier in the year, it still was not enough to put him in line for a win with Boston trailing 3–1. Fortunately, after being set down again in the bottom 6th, the Red Sox' bats came alive on the other side of the seventh-inning stretch with a 3-run frame. The inning began with Rays reliever Bryan Baker having freshly replaced Bradley. Baker immediately walked Trevor Story, who then proceeded to steal second base, and Romy González. With two men on, Marcelo Mayer doubled up the middle to advance González from first to third and score Story, pulling the Sox within a run. Still with no outs, Ceddanne Rafaela provided the hit of the night for the Sox, his single to center field enough to enable González to scamper home to tie the game and Mayer to score from second to provide the go-ahead run, giving Boston the lead back at 4–3. Baker then induced three consecutive outs to end the inning, but the damage had been done. In the top of the 8th, Garrett Whitlock hurled a critical 1-2-3 inning, and though the bottom 8th yielded nothing in the way of insurance for Boston, Aroldis Chapman came on in the 9th and struck out the last two batters he faced to earn his 16th save of the season. While Boston had engineered this winning streak on the strength of heavy hitting and high-scoring games against scuffling nonleague opponents, the Sox could now say they had earned their seventh consecutive victory by shutting down a fellow AL East rival in a one-run game. The Sox would send Hunter Dobbins to the mound on Friday night to face the Rays' Drew Rasmussen, hoping to make a figure eight out of this win streak. The series-opening win against Tampa Bay also put the Sox at a season-best five games above the .500 mark.

On Friday, Boston entered the second game of their series against the Rays by sending Hunter Dobbins to the mound opposite Tampa's Drew Rasmussen. Rasmussen only pitched two innings while Dobbins left after just 1 2/3 frames nursing an injury suffered while covering first base. This game would come down to the bullpens. Junior Caminero got on the board first, tagging Dobbins for an RBI single to left that scored Yandy Diaz, giving the Rays a 1–0 lead after a half-inning. In the bottom 2nd, Ceddanne Rafaela answered with an RBI single that scored Wilyer Abreu while advancing Abraham Toro to second base. In the top 3rd, however, the Rays got their lead back by loading the bases and then taking advantage of a Toro fielding error that allowed José Caballero to reach, forcing home Jonathan Aranda. Jake Mangum and Taylor Walls then scored on back-to-back passed balls from Sox reliever Brennan Bernardino, and just like that, the Rays cradled a 4–1 lead. The Sox responded, however, with a big inning in the bottom of the 4th, Marcelo Mayer's RBI double scored Abreu and Toro's RBI ground out on a fielder's choice enabled Trevor Story to scamper home, pulling Boston within a run. Headed into the 5th, both teams' bullpens settled in for a battle of wills: four Sox relievers combined to allow just two Rays hits in the final four innings of work. In the bottom of the 9th, still trailing by one run, Boston came to bat with Tampa needing three outs from Pete Fairbanks to snap Boston's seven-game win streak. Fairbanks induced a quick ground ball from Mayer, but then the Sox opted to play rookie sensation Roman Anthony as a pinch-hitter for Toro. Anthony was patient and drew a walk, suddenly putting the winning run at home plate in Rafaela. After taking a Fairbanks ball and fouling off two straight fastballs to fall into a 1-2 count, Rafaela said night-night to Fairbanks by annihilating an 86-mph slider and sending it in a high, arcing curve over the Green Monster for a come-from-behind walk-off 2-run home run that sent Fenway Park into absolute bedlam. The 409-foot explosion to left sealed a stunning 5–4 win and extended the Red Sox' win streak to eight straight games, and secured at least a split for Boston in a critical series against a division opponent. Friday night's game also marked a significant milestone in terms of the return of Alex Bregman to the lineup; although he failed to show up on the scoresheet, he went 1-for-4, striking out once. Now, owners of their franchise's first eight-game win streak since a stretch in April and May 2023, Boston would look to extend their streak to nine on Saturday in game three, with Garrett Crochet schedule to start alongside Tampa Bay's Shane Baz.

After Friday night's electrifying walk-off victory, the Red Sox floated into Saturday's game looking to power their way to a nine-game win streak behind their best starter in Crochet. However, the Mississippi native would need a masterful outing as Tampa Bay's Shane Baz was not about to roll over, either, shutting down the Sox for just one run on five hits in 6 1/3 innings. Crochet and Baz dueled each other for three and a half innings until the Sox pushed a run across in the bottom 4th, when Roman Anthony doubled off of Baz and was able to score on an RBI single from Carlos Narváez. However, unlike some other recent games in which the Sox piled on once drawing blood, Boston was shut down by Baz and reliever Edwin Uceta shut down Boston for the remainder of the contest, leaving the 1–0 Sox advantage to be protected by the pitching staff. Fortunately for the Boston bullpen, the term "pitching staff" on this day would consist entirely of Crochet, who was in the midst of twirling a phenomenal game. So dominant was Crochet that Alex Cora opted not to turn to closer Aroldis Chapman, leaving Crochet in for the top of the 9th. While all three Rays batters made contact in the 9th, Boston's defense bailed out Crochet with two ground outs and a line out, enabling Crochet to retire the side in order and lock up a 1–0 Sox victory and his first career complete game shutout. Crochet's final line: zero runs and just three hits and zero walks while striking out nine Tampa Bay hitters. Now riding a nine-game winning streak, their first since April 2021, Boston would look to sweep the Rays series and push their streak to double digits with a win in the series and first-half finale on Sunday afternoon with the Rays' Ryan Pepiot set to face a resurgent Brayan Bello.

Bello came out dealing on Sunday afternoon, looking to guide the Sox to a four-game sweep of the Rays. Bello twirled another magnificent outing, allowing just one run on six hits and no walks while striking out five Tampa Bay hitters in 6 1/3 innings of action. Pepiot, meanwhile, was strong early, but would fold in the sixth before being removed with a scoreline of four earned runs on seven hits and a walk, while striking out three Red Sox batters. Boston got on the board first courtesy of a Junior Caminero fielding error that enabled Marcelo Mayer to score from third base. The Rays answered in the top 4th with Josh Lowe's sacrifice fly that scored Jake Mangum, but this was all the run-scoring offense Tampa would be good for on this day. Boston broke the tie in the bottom of the 6th when Trevor Story laced an RBI single to left field that scored Roman Anthony. Ceddanne Rafaela then continued his hot streak with another electrifying hit, this one a bomb that ricocheted off the top of the Green Monster, enough to be declared a home run, a 2-run jack that also brought home Story and gave the Red Sox a 4–1 lead. Justin Wilson and Garrett Whitlock combined to allows just two baserunners, building a solid bridge from Bello to All-Star Game-bound closer Aroldis Chapman, who struck out all three batters he faced to lock up his 17th save of the season and send the Sox into the All-Star Break cradling a 10-game winning streak, their first since July 2018. Boston would look to extend their streak further within double-digit territory when beginning a series against the Chicago Cubs on Friday.

Red Sox won the series, 4–0 (14–8 runs)

==== July 14–17: All-Star Break in Atlanta, Georgia ====
Aroldis Chapman, Garrett Crochet, and Alex Bregman were all named to the American League All-Star Team for the Boston Red Sox. However, only Chapman would wind up rostered after Crochet and Bregman both opted out of the festivities: Crochet because he had pitched a full nine innings the preceding Saturday, and participating in the All-Star Game on Tuesday would have meant pitching on short rest; and Bregman because he had so recently returned from a long injury absence. Despite not suiting up for the game, Crochet and Bregman traveled to Atlanta along with Chapman. Chapman's role in the game would prove to be critical – having erased a 6–0 deficit to tie the game 6–6, the American League All-Stars turned to the Red Sox' Chapman to pitch the bottom of the 9th, and he shone by setting the National League down in order with a 1-2-3 inning, which included striking out the San Diego Padres' Fernando Tatis, Jr. For the first time ever, a tied All-Star Game after nine innings was neither declared over (as in 2002) nor sent to extra innings. Instead, a home run derby-style swing-off was declared the tiebreaker, with three hitters from each league participating. The National League won the swing-off 4–3 to take the game as a whole; the Philadelphia Phillies' Kyle Schwarber, a former Red Sox slugger, hit three home runs in the swing-off to lead the NL to victory.

==== July 18–20, at Chicago Cubs ====
The Red Sox came out of the All-Star Break looking to continue their ten-game winning streak, but it would not be easy, especially with a gauntlet of interleague series against National League blue-bloods – the NL Central-leading Cubs, NL East-leading Phillies, and NL West-leading Dodgers – on the schedule. Boston began this crucial stretch of their schedule by arriving at historic Wrigley Field for a Friday matinee to open a weekend series. Lucas Giolito got the nod on the hill for the Red Sox opposite Chicago's Colin Rea. Rea, though only lasting five innings, was solid, holding Boston to just one run on four hits and four walks while striking out five. Giolito, meanwhile, went 5 1/3 innings and gave up four earned runs on just five hits while allowing two walks and striking out six. Troubles began for Giolito as soon as he took the mound in the bottom 1st, as the righthander looked like he had yet to wake up and smell the second-half coffee, at pains to properly locate his pitches. Giolito walked Michael Busch and Kyle Tucker, then promptly gave up a Seiya Suzuki 3-run bomb to left center field. Giolito then gave up a double to Pete Crow-Armstrong after Alex Bregman lost a pop-up in the harsh midday sun. Fortunately, Giolito retired the next three batters in order, but trailing 3–0, the damage was already done. The Sox got a run back in the top of the 3rd when Jarren Duran drew a walk, advanced from first to third on a Bregman single, and then scored on a Roman Anthony. Unfortunately, Carlos Narváez then struck out to end the inning, stranding runners on second and third. The Red Sox would further frustrate their fans by letting another precious opportunity slip through their fingers in the top 5th. Abraham Toro began the inning by lacing a single to right field. Duran then walked to push Toro to second base. Alex Bregman then hit into what should have been a routine line out, but Toro made a break for third base and could not return to second nearly fast enough after the first out, being retired for a double play. The gaffe turned out what could have been two runners on with one out into a situation where only one runner was on with two outs, and Narváez promptly hit into a force out to end the inning, leaving the Sox scoreless in a frame where they might otherwise have been able to tie the game. In the bottom of the 6th, Giolito gave up an Ian Happ double to deep right field before being replaced by reliever Greg Weissert, who subsequently walked Dansby Swanson and gave up a Nico Hoerner double to score Happ, giving the Cubs a key insurance run. Up 4–1, the Cubs cobbled together a solid collection of relievers over the final four innings of the game, as Boston only gained three more hits after Rea left after five. Closer Daniel Palencia come on to protect Chicago's 3-run lead in the top 9th, and despite giving up a leadoff single to Marcelo Mayer, Palencia induced a ground ball double play and then a Toro fly out to end the game, securing a 4–1 Cubs win and shutting the door on the Sox' 10-game winning streak. The loss was only the second of the month for Boston, and their first since July 2. Off to a slow start after the four-day All-Star break, the Red Sox would look to even at a game apiece in a nationally televised Saturday evening contest at The Friendly Confines. Brayan Bello was scheduled to face Chicago's Shota Imanaga.

On the first pitch of the second game, Rob Refsnyder doubled against Shota Imanaga, providing what seemed to be a promising start for the Red Sox. However, Imanaga would retire the next three batters, and the Red Sox would strand Refsnyder at third base. To open the bottom of the first, Brayan Bello's first pitch of the game was sent into the Wrigley bleachers by Michael Busch to give the Cubs, and Kyle Tucker would homer the next at bat as well, giving the Cubs an early 2–0 lead. The Red Sox would once again strand a runner in scoring position in the top of the 2nd, this time Masataka Yoshida at second. The Cubs would add some offense in the bottom of the 2nd on a Vidal Bruján sacrifice fly. Both offenses would stay quiet in the game thereafter, with the Red Sox going three up, three down in every inning but the 4th until the 7th inning, where they managed to threaten the Cubs with runners at the corners, but with two outs. Catcher Connor Wong hoped to drive at least one of them in, but instead flew out on the first pitch of the at bat, continuing a season long struggle for him with runners in scoring position. Bello exited the game in the 7th, entering Chris Murphy, who managed to get the first batter out, but then let up a pinch hit home run to Matt Shaw, making the score 4–0 Cubs. After getting out of the inning, the Red Sox would once again go 1-2-3 in the top of the 8th, before Pete Crow-Armstrong and Ian Happ would hit back-to-back home runs to extend the Cubs lead to 6–0, and marking the second time in the game that the Cubs hit back-to-back home runs, and the fourth and fifth solo home run of the game for Chicago. The Red Sox would be unable to provide a rally in the 9th, ending the game, and hoping to turn the page the next game to end the series on a good note, as Garrett Crochet would go up against Cade Horton.

Hoping to leave Chicago without getting swept, the Red Sox got off to a better start than they had in the previous two games, keeping Chicago scoreless in the first inning, although they were not able to provide any offense of their own either. They were unable to get anything going in the top of the 2nd, but the Cubs looked to be threatening after a Pete Crow-Armstrong double to lead off the bottom of the inning. However, the Red Sox caught a break after Crow-Armstrong tried to steal third base, and was caught in a rundown, eventually being tagged out by Crochet in a situation where Crochet seemingly blocked the bag. Despite arguments from both Crow-Armstrong and Cubs manager Craig Counsell, no interference was called. This proved crucial, as Ian Happ singled in the next at-bat, scoring Dansby Swanson to give the Cubs a 1–0 lead that could have been 2–0. Happ would then be caught stealing to end the inning. The Red Sox offense would continue to struggle in the early games of the second half, as they would be held scoreless by Morton. In the bottom of the 5th, it looked like the Cubs would be adding on to their lead when Crochet walked both Kyle Tucker and Seiya Suzuki with two outs, loading the bases. However, Carson Kelly would ground out, getting Crochet and the Red Sox out of the inning unscathed. In the top of the 7th, Trevor Story would lead off the inning with a walk, and Wilyer Abreu would finally give the Red Sox a lead in the series with a two-run blast into the Wrigley bleachers, giving them a 2–1 lead. Garrett Whitlock would hold down the fort in the 7th, and all of a sudden, the Red Sox offense showed signs of life. A Jarren Duran walk and a Roman Anthony single turned into two baserunners with one out in the top of the 8th. With Masataka Yoshida due up, Alex Cora turned to Alex Bregman to pinch hit, even though Bregman was scheduled to take the game off to rest due to his hamstring injury. Instead, Bregman showed the Red Sox why they signed him, blasting a three-run pinch hit home run, and blowing the game open, 5–1 Red Sox. Just to put a cherry on top, Abreu would hit his second home run of the game (and 20th of the season) later in the inning, making it 6–1. In the bottom of the 8th, Jordan Hicks would make quick work of the heart of the Cubs lineup, and Jorge Alcalá continued his Boston success by doing the same to close out the game. The victory pushed the Red Sox to 11–3 in the month of July and gave them wins in 12 of their last 15 games as they traveled to the City of Brotherly Love to take on the Philadelphia Phillies, with Walker Buehler facing Zack Wheeler to open the series.

Red Sox lost the series, 1–2 (7–11 runs)

==== July 21–23, at Philadelphia Phillies ====
The Red Sox came into Philadelphia hoping to continue their momentum from the previous series finale, and that they did. In the first at-bat of the game, Jarren Duran hit a home run against Phillies ace Zack Wheeler and Boston jumped out to a very early 1–0 lead. Walker Buehler hoped to get back on track after a series of struggles, and despite a Bryce Harper double, got out of the inning unscathed. Both Wheeler and Buehler traded scoreless innings in the 2nd and 3rd, with Buehler getting two double plays over the next two innings, and Wheeler getting out of the innings despite the Red Sox having runners in scoring position in both. In the bottom of the 4th, however, Buehler would give up his first run, as Harper scored on a single from Nick Castellanos to tie the game, 1–1. After a passed ball moved Castellanos to second, he would then score on a J. T. Realmuto single, and all of a sudden, the Phillies led 2–1. Buehler would then strike out Brandon Walsh and let Otto Kemp fly out to get out of the inning without further damage. After a 1-2-3 top of the 5th, Marcelo Mayer would open the bottom of the 5th by robbing Max Kepler of at least a single with a stretching catch at second base. The next inning, the Red Sox would once again threaten Wheeler, after an Alex Bregman single and Roman Anthony double would put runners at second and third with one out for Trevor Story. This time, however, Boston managed to come through, and Story drove in Bregman to tie the game at 2–2. After a Wilyer Abreu strikeout, Story would steal second to once again put runners at second and third, this time for Ceddanne Rafaela. However, Rafaela would strikeout to hold the game at 2–2. A quick 1-2-3 6th put Buehler in a position to out-pitch Wheeler, an unexpected result. Wheeler would get replaced by Tanner Banks, who would let up a Abraham Toro single but got out of the inning scoreless. Buehler would once again pitch a 1-2-3 inning to finish his line at 7 innings pitched, a pleasant result. After Orion Kerkering replaced Banks for the Phillies, the Red Sox could not get any offense going, and Aroldis Chapman would make a rare appearance in the 8th inning for the Red Sox, facing four batters and striking out Harper to end in the inning. Neither team could score in the 9th, sending the game to extra innings. The Red Sox would manage to get the go-ahead run at third base against Max Lazar, but Anthony would strikeout to end the inning before they could score. Jordan Hicks entered the game for Boston, trying to send the game to the 11th, and walking Kemp to start the inning. After a wild pitch moved Marsh to third base and Kemp to second, Hicks opted to intentionally walk Kepler, loading the bases with no outs. In the at-bat against Edmundo Sosa, Hicks threw a pitch that was check-swung, and initially called a ball. However, after Philadelphia asked for a review of the pitch, it was determined that Sosa's bat had made contact with the glove of Red Sox catcher Carlos Narváez, meaning that catcher interference had taken place. As such, Sosa was rewarded a base, as with the bases loaded, the winning run was scored, ending the game, 3–2 in favor of Philadelphia. It was the first time since July 1, 1971, that a walk-off had occurred on catcher interference, and it gave the Red Sox their third loss in the last four games since the All-Star Game.

For the second game of the series, the Red Sox sent out Richard Fitts, who was starting his first game since earning his first career win against the Colorado Rockies prior to the All-Star Break. For the Phillies, it was Cristopher Sánchez, who got a quick first inning. Unfortunately for Fitts and the Red Sox, they did not receive the same luxury. A leadoff single from Trea Turner set the tone, and he was moved over to third on a Bryce Harper single, putting runners on the corners with only one out. Nick Castellanos would then hit another single to push Harper to third, and score Turner to give the Phillies an early 1–0 lead. After a J. T. Realmuto strikeout, Fitts seemed poised to get out of the inning without further damage. However, Harper attempted one of the most exciting plays in baseball, attempting a steal of home, but a balk was initially called on the play, scoring Harper regardless while also moving Castellanos to third. After an umpire review, it was determined that Red Sox catcher Carlos Narváez had committed catcher interference, his second in not just two games, but in back-to-back innings, given that a Narváez catcher interference had served as the game-winning walk-off play for Philadelphia the night before. With the interference call, not only did Harper score and Castellanos move to third, as had initially happened, but now, Brandon Marsh was awarded first base, giving Philadelphia runners on the corners once again. Fitts, however, would get out of the inning after an Otto Kemp flyout. Coming off an eventful 1st inning, the Red Sox hoped to turn the tide, but went down in order. Meanwhile, the Phillies built off the craziness that had previously happened, and Max Kepler led off with a home run, making it 3–0 Phillies. Once again, Fitts seemed like he would get out of the inning without further damage after two quick outs, but old friend Kyle Schwarber had other plans, blasting a home run to extend the Phillies lead to 4–0. Although the Red Sox would once again fail to get a baserunner in the third, Rob Refsnyder looked to give his team a spark, blasting a lead-off home run in the 4th to cut the lead to 4–1, but that was all the offense the Red Sox would get in the inning. In the bottom of the 4th, Brennan Bernardino replaced Fitts, and despite having runners on second and first, would hold the lead to 4–1. Bernardino would hold down the fort for 1.2 innings, letting up a lone hit and keeping the Phillies scoreless. Unfortunately, on the other side of the mound, Sánchez was making quick innings of the Red Sox offense, striking out the side in the 6th. Likewise, Chris Murphy would keep the Phillies scoreless for two innings after Bernardino, but the Red Sox could not get any offense going, managing only two hits after the 6th inning, and never getting a runner past first. Greg Weissert would pitch a scoreless 8th, and Sánchez would get his 11th and 12th strikeouts of the game in the top of the ninth, pitching a complete game against the Boston offense, as the Phillies won, 4–1. The loss sent the Red Sox to 1–5 after the All-Star Break, and for the second series in a row, the Red Sox were going into the final game hoping to avoid a sweep, sending Lucas Giolito against Jesús Luzardo.

Looking to salvage a game in the series, the Red Sox did not start the game off in a way that would help them do so. After a quick top of the 1st against Jesús Luzardo, Trea Turner singled, followed by Kyle Schwarber and Bryce Harper back-to-back home runs as the Phillies jumped to an early 3–0 lead against Lucas Giolito. The Red Sox seemed poised to repeat their trend of lacking offense, going three-up, three-down in the first three innings. Meanwhile, in the bottom of the 3rd, Nick Castellanos hit the third home run of the game for the Phillies to extend their lead to 4–0. After finally getting a baserunner in the 4th on a Rob Refsnyder walk, the Red Sox once again could not muster any momentum, staying scoreless. On the other hand, the Phillies continued to see the ball well against Giolito, as Bryson Stott hit yet another home run in the bottom of the 5th, making it 5–0 Phillies. However, a Masataka Yoshida leadoff double in the 6th would hope to set the tone for Boston. It was followed by a Cedanne Rafaela walk, putting two men on with no outs, but Wilyer Abreu and Carlos Narváez got out quickly to put Luzardo one out away from keeping it scoreless. Marcelo Mayer would walk to load the bases, and everything pointed to the Red Sox not being able to salvage a run in the inning when Rob Refsnyder got a high pop-up in foul ground, seemingly ending the inning. However, J.T. Realmuto could not find the ball, and it dropped, giving Refsnyder and the Red Sox a second chance. They would not let this chance go to waste, as Refsnyder walked to score Yoshida and keep the bases loaded, making it 5–1 Phillies. Then, Jarren Duran would walk, scoring Rafaela. The next at bat, Romy González decided he had enough and cleared the bases with a grand slam, and suddenly it was 6–5 Red Sox. With the heart of the Phillies lineup approaching, the Red Sox turned to Justin Wilson, who was able to retire Schwarber, Harper, and Castellanos out, in order. Meanwhile, in the top of the 7th, Boston would threaten to extend their lead, as Narváez led off with a double, followed by a walk by Roman Anthony, and after a force play, the Red Sox had runners on the corners with two outs for González, who would strikeout to end the inning. With Jordan Hicks in the game, the Phillies had a scoring threat of their own, with Trea Turner on second with two outs, and Schwarber at the plate. The Red Sox would turn to their All-Star closer Aroldis Chapman, and he would manage to get Schwarber to fly out to Rafaela, ending the inning. Chapman stayed on for the 8th after the Red Sox could not get any insurance, and would get two quick outs. However, Realmuto had to redeem himself for his blunder earlier, and he blasted a home run off Chapman to tie the game at 6–6. Neither team could earn the victory in the 9th, sending the game to extra innings for the second time in the series. Max Lazar started out extra innings for the Phillies, and let up a Trevor Story double that scored Duran, the ghost runner. The Red Sox could not score Story, and Garrett Whitlock would try to preserve the lead and earn the save. Quickly, however, Schwarber had a hit of his own that scored the ghost runner, tying the game 7–7. However, he was pinch ran for by Weston Wilson, who was caught stealing and ended the inning. In the top of the 11th, Narváez decided he wanted redemption of his own for his errors earlier in the series, and he eked out a home run that just snuck over the wall, making it 9–7 Red Sox. Jorge Alcalá would attempt the save for the Red Sox, but would give up a RBI single to Johan Rojas after two outs, entering Brennan Bernardino, who would get the one-out save, giving the Red Sox the victory. The victory gave the Red Sox their second victory post All-Star Game, and for the second series in a row, avoided the sweep. After an off-day, the Red Sox will travel back home to face the Los Angeles Dodgers with Brayan Bello facing Emmet Sheehan.

Red Sox lost the series, 1–2 (12–15 runs)

==== July 25–27, vs. Los Angeles Dodgers ====
The Red Sox returned to Fenway to take on the defending World Series Champions, the Los Angeles Dodgers. The first game of the Series ended in a 5–2 loss for the Sox.

The Red Sox evened the series with a 4─2 victory on Saturday as Garrett Crochet faced Dodger legend Clayton Kershaw. Boston rallied to take a 4–2 lead and Crochet struck out ten Dodger hitters after giving up home runs to Shohei Ohtani and Teoscar Hernandez in the first inning. A Jarren Duran triple in the 2nd brought home two runs before Abraham Toro's sac fly brought home Duran. In the 5th, Roman Anthony's 13th double of the season scored Alex Bregman to give the Sox some insurance, and Aroldis Chapman closed the game by striking out ex-Sox slugger Mookie Betts to earn his 18th save.

The Red Sox clinched the series with a 4–3 victory. Walker Buehler ran into trouble early against his old team, loading the bases and walking in the tying run in the top 3rd to squander a 1–0 Boston lead. Michael Conforto homered to right in the 4th before a Betts RBI single put Los Angeles ahead 3–1. In the 5th, however Roman Anthony hustled all the way to third base for an RBI triple that scored Toro, and Bregman sent Fenway Park into a frenzy with a 2-run home run–his first at Fenway since returning from injury–to put the Sox up by one. With Aroldis Chapman in some discomforts, the Sox turned to Jordan Hicks in the bottom of the 9th, and Hicks struck out Freddie Freeman, induced a ground ball from Andy Pages, and worked around a walk to induce a Tommy Edman ground out for his second save of the season, giving the Red Sox a 2–1 series victory against the defending World Series champions.

Red Sox won the series, 2–1 (10–10 runs)

==== July 28–30, at Minnesota Twins ====
The Red Sox entered their series in Minnesota shaken up after severe weather forced their turbulent charter flight, which gave some players motion sickness to divert to Detroit and the team arrived in Minneapolis later than expected. Still, the Red Sox refused to use the flight or a late rain delay as an excuse for a rough 5–4 walk-off loss. Richard Fitts had a decent but abbreviated outing, only lasting four innings and giving up two runs on four hits and three walks while striking out two. A 2-run home run from DaShawn Keirsey gave the Twins a 2–0 lead in the bottom 3rd. The Sox struck back to take the lead in the 5th as Alex Bregman continued his return to form with a 3-run long ball to center field that came with Roman Anthony and Abraham Toro on base, Bregman's 14th home run of 2025. In the bottom 6th, however, Minnesota tied the game on an RBI fly out from ex-Sox catcher Christian Vázquez, scoring Royce Lewis from third. In the top of the 9th with the game tied, Roman Anthony's RBI single up the middle drove home baserunner David Hamilton to give the Sox a 4–3 advantage, but the game soon thereafter entered a rain delay that would end up lasting 90 minutes. Jordan Hicks summarily entered the game looking to shut down Minnesota for good; instead, the results were disastrous as Hicks gave up a Keirsey single and hit both Willi Castro and Mickey Gasper to load the bases before Brooks Lee's RBI single brought home both the thing and winning runs to walk off a 5–4 Minnesota victory, adding yet another painful loss to the Sox' array of one-run defeats this season. The Sox would look to bounce back on Tuesday with a resurgent Lucas Giolito on the mound.

The Sox looked to bounce back from a dispiriting start to the series with Giolito on the mound against the Twins' Pierson Ohl, who was making his major league debut. Giolito continued to produce solid outings with a six-inning performance against the Twins in which he allowed just one earned run on five hits and fanned five Minnesota batters while only allowing two walks. Ohl, meanwhile, was roughed up by the Sox early and only lasted three innings, giving up four earned runs on five hits. Roman Anthony got a big Boston inning going in the top of the 3rd with an RBI single to center the scored Ceddanne Rafaela. Bregman then laced his 20th double to score Anthony with the aid of a fielding error by Willi Castro. Trevor Story then launched an Ohl pitch over the center field fence for his 16th home run of the year, a 2-run long ball that gave Boston a 4–0 lead. In the top 5th, Jarren Duran added on with a solo shot to center to make it a 5–0 advantage. Brooks Lee, Monday night's hero for Minnesota, struck again with a single to left field, advancing to second base on a Rafaela fielding error. Harrison Bader scored on the play, putting the Twins on the board, 5–1. In the top of the 6th, Rafaela redeemed himself with an RBI sac fly to center that brought home Carlos Narváez. Lee made it a 6–3 game in the 7th when he pounced on a pitch and sent it into the center field seats for a 2-run blast. In the top 9th, the Sox appeared to regain insurance with a 2-run frame that included RBI doubles from Story and Wilyer Abreu. However, in the bottom 9th, an increasingly stubborn Lee refused to roll over, hammering his second homer of the game, another 2-run blast that made it 8–5 Boston. Reliever Jorge Alcala was pulled in favor of Aroldis Chapman; with just one out left, the team had been hoping to give the closer a day of rest. Chapman succeeded in ending any further rallies from the Twins and earned his 19th save of the year. Having evened the series, the Red Sox would look to take the rubber game on Wednesday afternoon.

Brayan Bello made the start in the Wednesday afternoon getaway game in Minneapolis, played in hazy conditions due to smoke plumes coming into the Twin Cities from Canadian wildfires. The Red Sox appeared to be breathing just fine, however, as they would put forth one of their more enviable offensive performances of this season on this day. Bello went seven innings, giving up just one run on five hits and striking out four Twins hitters. Chris Murphy shut down Minnesota in the final two innings to give the rest of the bullpen a day off. On the other side of the field, the Twins used six pitchers and were hard pressed to find one who could contain a rolling Boston offense – only one Minnesota hurler did not give up an earned run in this game, and starter Zebby Matthews was charged with the loss (five earned runs on four hits in 4 1/3 innings). Boston showed signs of life offensively in the 2nd (Trevor Story solo home run, his 17th of the year) and 3rd (Abraham Toro's sac fly that scored Connor Wong), but their onslaught didn't begin in earnest until the 5th, when the Sox posted a 4-run frame. With Anthony and Wong on base, Jarren Duran's single to center brought both of them how, putting Boston up 4–1 and ending Matthews' day. After Story and Romy González both walked, Masataka Yoshida laced a 2-RBI single to right to score both runners, giving the Red Sox a 6–1 advantage. An inning later, in the top 6th with Anthony on base, Duran demolished a cut fastball from reliever Noah Davis and sent it 416 feet into the right center field seats. The Sox could have called it an afternoon there with a seven-run lead and strong pitching to protect it, but Boston piled on in the top of the 9th with a feel-good five-run inning that included two home runs. The inning began with Griffin Jax on the mound, who would not be able to record a single out. Abreu's single to right field brought home Duran. With Abreu and David Hamilton on base, González, facing position player Kody Clemens (son of ex-Sox and Yankees hurler Roger), launched a two-run bomb to center field. Yoshida then put an exclamation point on the afternoon by definitively announcing his return to the lineup with his first home run of 2025, a solo jack to right field that made it a 13–1 ballgame in Boston's favor. Minnesota's only run had come way back in the bottom 2nd – Matt Wallner's solo home run would wind up being the only blemish on Bello's scorecard. Having taken two of three on this quick roadie, the Red Sox would return to wait the Thursday trade deadline and possible changes to the makeup of their roster. On Friday, the always-intimidating Houston Astros would await to begin August with a three-game weekend series at Fenway Park.

Red Sox won the series, 2–1 (25–11 runs)

==== July 31: Trade deadline ====
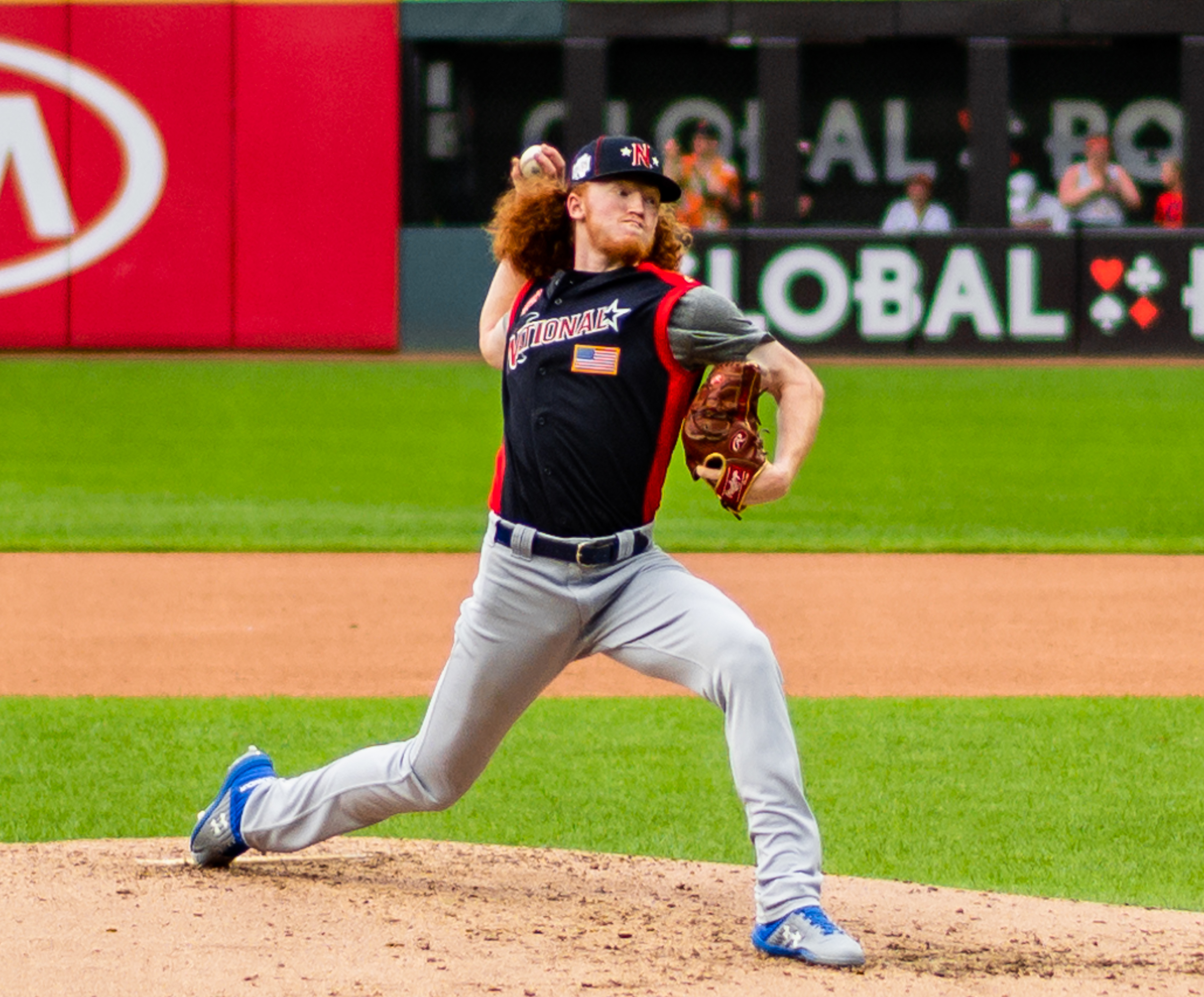
Dustin May was the primary acquisition for the Red Sox at the trade deadline; the ex-Los Angeles Dodger starter helped fortify the back end of Boston's rotation.

The Red Sox and chief of baseball operations Craig Breslow were quieter than expected ahead of and on Trade Deadline day, making only two moves, both to support the pitching staff, but they avoided selling or standing completely pat. The Sox also did not need to get rid of any players on the major league roster to acquire their two pieces. Seven minutes before midnight on July 30, Jeff Passan of ESPN announced that the Sox had dealt prospect Blaze Jordan to the St. Louis Cardinals in exchange for relief pitcher (and former starter) Steven Matz. The next day, at 5:48 pm, twelve minutes before the trade deadline was to officially close, Passan again was the first to announce a Sox trade, as Boston made another deal with frequent trade partners the Los Angeles Dodgers, with L.A. sending starting pitcher Dustin May to the Red Sox. Headed out to L.A. in the deal would be prospects Zach Ehrhard and James Tibbs III, who had been acquired in the Rafael Devers trade with the Giants on June 15.

=== August ===
August game summaries

==== August 1–3, vs. Houston Astros ====
In the Friday night opener, Boston rookie sensation Roman Anthony ended a duel of pitching staffs in the tenth inning with his first career walk-off hit, a single to deep center field with runners on second and third that scored Wilyer Abreu. The low-scoring thriller in which spot starter Cooper Criswell overcame an early Astros home run by Christian Walker to hurl seven innings of one-run, seven-hit ball with four strikeouts resulted in a 2–1 victory for the Red Sox (who had tied the game in the 7th on Abreu's RBI sacrifice fly). The Sox improved to 60–51 in their first game after the trade deadline, climbing to nine games above .500, their best mark of the season thus far.

In Saturday's contest, Walker Buehler faced Houston's Colton Gordon. Buehler twirled 4 1/3 innings and gave up three earned runs on nine hits, walking three Astros and failing to record a strikeout, but Boston's offense would bail him out as Gordon had the worse outing of the two (six earned runs on seven hits despite six strikeouts in four innings). For the second straight game, Houston got on the board first via a Christian Walker home run in the top of the 1st, but the Astros' advantage was short-lived, as Romy González belted a solo homer of his own to center field off of Gordon in the bottom half of the inning, making it 1–1 after one. After a scoreless second, Boston hung three runs on Houston in the 3rd (a Rob Refsnyder RBI single, scoring González; Trevor Story's 18th home run of the season, a 2-run bomb over the Monster with Refsnyder on base) and two runs on the visitors from H-Town in the 4th (Abraham Toro's homer to left came with Ceddanne Rafaela on base). Down 6–2, Houston added a run in the top 5th when Yainer Diaz singled home Carlos Correa, but Story put the game on ice in the 7th with an RBI double to score Refsnyder. Working with a four-run lead, Aroldis Chapman still earned a save – his 20th – by shutting down the Astros lineup in the 9th. After Buehler exited, Boston used six relievers, one of whom was Steven Matz, traded for on the night for July 31 deadline and who made his first appearance in a Red Sox uniform. Matz faced four batters and walked one and struck out one in one inning pitched. The 7–3 win put Boston ten games above .500, and the Sox would look to close out the series with a sweep on Sunday afternoon.

Sunday's matchup featured a showdown between Sox starter Lucas Giolito and Houston hurler Framber Valdez. Giolito was as advertised, giving up just one run and three hits with four strikeouts and one walk. Giolito worked eight solid innings, making this start the deepest Giolito had pitched in a game so far this season. Valdez, by contrast, went six innings but gave up six runs (five earned) on seven hits, striking out three and walking one. Correa opened the scoring with a 4th inning solo blast to center field that put Houston up 1–0, but Boston responded with a prolific six-run inning that would prove to be all the offense they needed on this afternoon. The frame began with Story singling home Roman Anthony to tie the game. Ceddanne Rafaela then laced a line drive that scored baserunner Romy González, and with Abraham Toro at the plate and Rafaela on first, Valdez committed a balk, allowing both runners to move 90 feet and enabling Story to jog home. Later in the inning, Wilyer Abreu brought out the sacrifice bunt to score Rafaela. Catcher Connor Wong's sacrifice fly then brought home Toro. Lastly, Abreu scored from third with two outs on a Rob Refsnyder ground out. Chris Murphy pitched the 9th with the Sox up five runs, giving Aroldis Chapman a day off. The Red Sox' victory put them 11 games above .500 and gave them their first sweep of the Astros since 2013. Boston would take a five-game win streak into the back half of their homestand, a three-game series against Kansas City beginning Monday; Brayan Bello was slated to start opposite Bailey Falter.

Red Sox won the series 3–0 (15–5 runs)

==== August 4–6, vs. Kansas City Royals ====
The Red Sox extended their winning streak to six games in the opener of their series against the Royals with an 8–5 victory over Kansas City at Fenway Park. Brayan Bello had a strong six-inning outing for the Sox, allowing only one run (zero earned runs) on six hits and a walk while fanning five Royal batters. Bailey Falter, meanwhile, struggled mightily on the mound for Kansas City, charged with seven earned runs on eight hits with two walks and just two strikeouts, being pulled after only four innings. Boston drew blood first and rattled Falter early with a five-run inning in the bottom of the 1st. Romy González and Alex Bregman hit back to back singles and Wilyer Abreu worked a walk to load the bases before Falter recorded a single out. Rob Refsnyder then singled to center for a 2-RBI hit that brought home Gonzàlez and Bregman. Falter got two quick outs, but could not get out of the inning prior to a 3-run home run to center field that gave Boston a 5–0 lead. The Sox tacked on another run in the 3rd via a Ceddanne Rafaela RBI single, the Royals got on the board in the top 4th with an Adam Frazier sac fly, and the Sox restored their 6-run cushion with a Bregman RBI single that scored Abraham Toro, putting Boston up 7–1. After a scoreless 5th and 6th, Abreu singled home González in the bottom 7th to give the Red Sox an 8–1 advantage. These insurance runs would prove critical, however, as Kansas City was readying an attack of its own. In the 8th, the Royals roughed up the Sox bullpen with a 4-run frame. With Jorge Alcala pitching, Vinnie Pasquantino and Maikel Garcia hit back-to-back solo bombs. Mike Yastrzemski, visiting his grandfather Carl's home ballpark after a trade deadline deal involving the Giants, continued to contribute for his new team, doubling to shallow left field and advancing to third base on an Abreu fielding error. Justin Wilson replaced Alcala, but also struggled to put out the flames, as Frazier singled home the younger "Yaz" to put the Royals within four runs. Nick Loftin's subsequent single brought home Frazier, putting Kansas City within three, still with just one out. Fortunately, Wilson struck out Randal Grichuk before being replaced by Garrett Whitlock, who gave up a single to Bobby Witt Jr. but got the inning-ending out when Abreu successfully unleashed a rocket of a throw to catcher Connor Wong, who tagged Loftin out at home. In the top of the 9th, still up three runs, the Red Sox toted out closer Aroldis Chapman, who struck out one in his 21st save of the season.

Tuesday was Garrett Crochet's turn on the mound for Boston, and the Red Sox' ace had another sterling performance, twirling seven innings of two-run, four-hit ball while striking out eight Kansas City hitters and only walking one. Crochet countered starter Ryan Bergert for Kansas City; Bergert, an ex-San Diego Padre making his first start with the Royals, gave up two runs on two hits while striking out two and walking two across 5 2/3 innings. Boston yet again scored first, as Jarren Duran's RBI double brought home González and gave the Red Sox a 1–0 advantage in the bottom 3rd. In the 4th, Crochet let an earned run go by in the form of a Maikel Garcia RBI double that scored Witt Jr., who had tripled. In the bottom of the 6th, Bregman's walk and Abreu's double put runners on second and third with two outs for Trevor Story, who singled home both runners to give the Sox a 3–1 lead. Kansas City closed to within a run in the top of the 7th, as Grichuk doubled to score Garcia, but Boston broke the game open for good with a 3-run bottom 7th as Abreu laced a 2-RBI single to score two baserunners (Duran and David Hamilton), and Story's bloop single scored Bregman. Up 6–2, the Sox pulled Crochet and put the lead in the hands of relievers Greg Weissert and Jordan Hicks, who pitched the 8th and 9th, respectively. Weissert hurled a hitless 8th and Hicks shut the door with a one-hit 9th, as the Red Sox extended their winning streak to seven games, with Dustin May set to make his Red Sox debut in the series finale on Wednesday.

Dustin May took the mound for his Sox debut looking to help the Red Sox to an eighth straight victory as well as a sweep of the Royals and of their six-game homestand. May was countered by Kansas City's starter, ex-Red Sox pitcher Michael Wacha. It would be unfair to call May's start disastrous, but it was not dazzling either, as the recently acquired former Dodger went just 3 2/3 innings while giving up three earned runs on six hits while walking one and striking out four. Wacha, meanwhile, went six frames and surrendered two earned runs on five hits while fanning three and walking none. Boston struck first, with Romy González's double to center in the bottom 1st scoring Jarren Duran and Trevor Story. After two scoreless innings, however May would begin to be rattled by the Royals in the top of the 3rd, as Bobby Witt Jr. singled home Mike Yastrzemski to tie the game. In the 4th, Kyle Isbel's 2-RBI single up the middle scored both John Rave and Jonathan India, and India himself broke the game open in the top of the 7th against reliever Jordan Hicks with a 3-run home run that cleared the Green Monster with Salvador Perez and Adam Frazier on base, putting the Royals up 6–2. K.C. got an extra insurance run in the top of the 8th when Vinnie Pasquantino singled home Tyler Tolbert for a 7–2 advantage. Story's line drive single in the bottom half of the inning scored Wong to pull the Sox within four runs, but Carlos Estévez shut down Boston in the 9th for a 7–3 Royals win. Licking their wounds, the Red Sox would board a long cross-country flight to San Diego to face the Padres in a weekend series, where they would endeavor to get back in the win column Friday night with Walker Buehler set to face another ex-Sox starter in Nick Pivetta.

Red Sox won the series, 2–1 (17–14 runs)

==== August 8–10, at San Diego Padres ====
The Red Sox won the opener of their series against the Padres on Friday night, 10–2, as Walker Buehler picked up his seventh win of the season (six scoreless innings pitched while surrendering just four hits and striking out four) and Masataka Yoshida and Connor Wong each provided 3 RBIs. Wong's 3-RBI double to deep left field was his first hit of the season with runners in scoring position. Yoshida crushed his second home run of the season and Wilyer Abreu blasted his team-leading 21st as the Sox went nuclear on former Boston starter Nick Pivetta, who gave up five earned runs on five hits and three walks across six innings.

The Sox' Lucas Giolito struggled in the middle game on Saturday, giving up four earned runs on five hits and six walks while only striking out one in 4 2/3 innings of work. Boston kept up with San Diego's offense, and tied the game in the top of the ninth off a Roman Anthony RBI double to force extra innings – but Boston's poor performances on the road in extra innings surfaced again, as Garrett Whitlock gave up a walk-off hit to Ramon Laureano that scored ex-Sox slugger Xander Bogaerts as the Padres won 5–4 in walk-off fashion in ten frames. The loss was Boston's league-high eleventh walk-off defeat.

In the Sunday finale, Brayan Bello's poor day on the mound for the Red Sox compounded a fine outing from Padres starter Dylan Cease and the San Diego bullpen. Bello struck out seven but allowed five earned runs on just six hits in 5 2/3 innings of work, while Cease went six innings and allowed just two runs on four hits while striking out seven. Luis Arráez jumped on Bello to open the scoring in the bottom 3rd with a 2-RBI double, and Fernando Tatis Jr. provided a 2-RBI single in the 5th. Bogaerts made his former team pay yet again with an RBI single in the 6th, and then, with the bases loaded, Bogaerts scored on Bello's walk to Jake Cronenworth. It was the 7th before Boston cooked up any offense, when Romy González's RBI fielder's choice coupled with a Bogaerts error scored two runs in Trevor Story and Jarren Duran. Still down 5–2, though, San Diego got an insurance run in the bottom half of the inning when Ryan O'Hearn's sac fly scored Tatis Jr., wrapping up the scoring in what proved to be a 6–2 victory as San Diego took the series with back-to-back wins on Saturday and Sunday.

Red Sox lost the series, 1–2 (16–13 runs)

==== August 11–13, at Houston Astros ====
Monday's opener against the Astros in Houston marked Alex Bregman's return to the Space City, and although Bregman got a nice hand and warm welcome from Astros fans, the third baseman quieted the home crowd with a 2-run home run in his first at-bat, a bomb to the left field "Crawford Boxes" that also scored Roman Anthony. However, the game was about to go south for the Red Sox in a major way. With ace Garrett Crochet pitching, nobody could have suspected that the Mississippi native was about to put in his first truly poor performance since joining Boston. Crochet lasted a season-low four innings after giving up five earned runs on seven hits. While Crochet kept the Astros at bay through two innings, Houston jumped all over him in the 3rd, with Carlos Correa's RBI single scoring Cam Smith while advancing Jeremy Peña. Correa and Peña then both scored on a Christian Walker double, allowing the Astros to take a 3–2 lead. In the 4th, Chas McCormick tagged Crochet for a 2-run homer to left, and in the 5th, with Crochet out of the game, Jordan Hicks ran into just as much trouble when Ramón Urías provided his own 2-run big fly. Down 7–2, things looked bleak for the Sox, but there was plenty of baseball left, and to their credit, Boston would nearly make a comeback. The Sox got a big 7th inning from Abraham Toro, Masataka Yoshida, and Roman Anthony – Toro hit a solo homer to center to get the Sox back on the scoreboard; Yoshida's double scored Ceddanne Rafaela to pull the Sox within three; and Anthony's third jack of the season with Connor Wong on base also scored two runs. Now trailing only 7–6, the Sox looked to tie the game but were unable to get past relievers Enyel De Los Santos and Bennett Sousa, who collected his fourth save. The 7–6 loss extended the Sox' winless streak to three and pushed their record down to 65–55, just ten games above .500.

Fortunately, the Red Sox responded in a big way in the middle game of the series as Dustin May took the mound for the second time in a Boston uniform. May had invited skepticism among fans after a skittish Red Sox debut, but May was on point against the Astros, twirling six scoreless innings and giving up five hits while fanning eight Houston hitters. Meanwhile, Boston's offense would go nuclear on this day, especially in the later innings. While they did not score until the 3rd, when Story was hit by a pitch with the bases loaded, forcing home Carlos Narváez, the Sox would soon make their hitting power very clear to starter Spencer Arrighetti and a parade of Houston relievers, none of whom could quite figure out how to stifle the Sox and which eventually included position player Chas McCormick. Yoshida's sac fly later in the 3rd scored Anthony, and while the Sox remained with just the 2–0 advantage over the next two frames, Boston's offensive explosion began in earnest in the 6th, when Narváez and Bregman each homered, Narváez providing a 3-run jack with Rafaela and Yoshida on base, and Bregman blasting a 2-run homer with Anthony on the basepaths. The five-run inning put Boston up 7–0, but they were not close to finished. Wilyer Abreu's double in the 7th brought home both Yoshida and Story for a 9–0 lead, and in the 8th, Anthony's leadoff solo homer made it double digits for the Sox. Toro's RBI single and Abreu's 2-RBI double made it a 12–0 contest as the inning continued, and the Sox kept their foot on the gas pedal in the 9th with a Story RBI single that also loaded the bases and a Yoshida RBI force out that enabled Bregman to scamper home, giving Boston an insurmountable 14–0 advantage. Houston did break up the shutout in the bottom 9th by pushing one run across, but otherwise it was sunshine and rainbows for the Red Sox as they evened the series with a much-needed breakout victory, climbing back to 11 games over .500 and setting up a rubber match Wednesday Walker Buehler and Hunter Brown.

The Astros won the rubber game 4–1 behind a 2-run first inning and home runs from Peña and Diaz. Rafaela provided the only Sox RBI with a 2nd-inning single. Walker Buehler pitched six innings and gave up four runs, all earned, on four hits and four walks. Hunter Brown scattered six hits in 6 2/3 innings, but Boston could not make them count after their 13-run outburst the previous day. The Red Sox headed home having gone 2–4 on their six-game road trip, losing two games each to the Padres and Astros. Fortunately for Boston, after a stretch of premier opponents, the as-yet mediocre Miami Marlins would come into town over the weekend.

Red Sox lost the series, 1–2 (21–12 runs)

==== August 15–17, vs. Miami Marlins ====
Boston opened its series with the Marlins by sending Lucas Giolito to the mound opposite Miami's Sandy Alcantara, and the matchup quickly became a pitcher's duel. Giolito went 6 1/3 innings and gave up just one run on seven hits while striking out five Miami hitters. Alcantara, meanwhile, twirled seven frames, gave up just one run on two hits, and struck out seven Red Sox. With the starting pitchers on the mound, the only Marlins run had been a Kyle Stowers RBI double in the 3rd, which was answered by an Alex Bregman RBI double in the 6th. After Giolito left the contest, Boston's bullpen held up with Justin Wilson, Garrett Whitlock, and Aroldis Chapman combining to allow no runs, just two hits, and no walks. The Red Sox took advantage of shakiness in the bottom of the 9th from Marlins reliever Josh Simpson, who began the inning by walking Roman Anthony and Bregman before hitting Jarren Duran with a pitch, enabling the Sox to load the bases without a single hit. Simpson was himself relieved by Calvin Faucher. Faucher faced Trevor Story, who immediately laced a single to right field that enabled Anthony to scamper home for the walk-off game-winning run. The 2–1 victory marked the fifth time in 2025 that Boston had won in walk-off fashion while wearing their "Fenway Greens" City Connect uniforms.

In the middle game on Saturday, Brayan Bello got the nod to pitch opposite Miami's Cal Quantrill. The Sox got on the board right away with a 2-RBI single from Masataka Yoshida in the bottom 1st that got buried deep in right field and brought home both Story and Anthony. In the 3rd, Duran doubled home Anthony before Trevor Story's 3-run jack over the Monster with both Duran and Bregman on base gave the Sox a 6–0 lead. Bregman kept the parade of runs going in the bottom 4th, singling home Ceddanne Rafaela for a 7–0 advantage. The Marlins would rally to make this game close, however – Troy Johnston's first major league home run for Miami off the schneid in the 5th, and Agustín Ramírez's solo blast to right in the 7th made it 7–2. The Fish really pressed, however, in the top of the 9th, facing a shaky Isaiah Campbell. Campbell gave up three runs on four hits in just 2/3 of an inning – more specifically, Campbell surrendered an RBI single to Heriberto Hernández, an RBI triple to Eric Wagaman and a single to Derek Hill that scored Wagaman from third base. With the Marlins having cut the Red Sox' lead to just two runs, manager Alex Cora thought it necessary to call upon Chapman with the game now in a save situation. Chapman induced a ground out from the first and only batter he faced to end the game, earn his 22nd save, and seal a 7–5 Red Sox victory, but Campbell's poor performance would come back to haunt the Sox in the Sunday finale.

Sunday saw ace Garrett Crochet take the mound on a steamy Sunday afternoon at Fenway Park. The Marlins sent out starter Janson Junk to try to salvage the finale of the series. Junk had a solid outing, giving up just three runs on six hits with six strikeouts in seven innings pitched. Crochet, however, gave up just one run on theee hits, also through seven, and set down eight Miami batters on strikers, and there was no beating a starting pitching performance of that caliber – or so it would seem. While Miami had struck first with Wagaman homering to center field in the 3rd, Abreu hit a two-run blast in the 4th that looked like a routine deep fly ball out until Marlins right fielder Dane Myers bobbled the ball at the last second and dropped it over the bullpen wall, and it was called a home run. Holding a 2–1 lead on this lucky break, Boston got an insurance run in the 7th when Abraham Toro scored Abreu from third base on a critical RBI sac fly. However, once Crochet left the game, things began to unravel for the Red Sox. It began when Garrett Whitlock allowed an RBI bloop single to left from Liam Hicks which scored Xavier Edwards, making it a 3–2 Boston advantage. While the Sox still held the lead going into the top of the 9th, thanks to Isaiah Campbell's troubled outing late in Saturday's game, closer Aroldis Chapman had made appearances on two straight days, and the Sox were ill at ease at the prospect of sending him out in a third straight contest. Therefore, the Sox charged Greg Weissert with notching the final three outs, and Weissert summarily gave up a solo home run to Myers, who avenged his misplay on the Abreu home run by tying the game with his own long ball. Weissert induced a ground ball to Troy Johnston but allowed a single from Wagaman, at which point Weissert was relieved in favor of Steven Matz. Matz compounded the issue by giving up a poorly placed sinker to Jakob Marsee, who stroked the pitch 394 feet over the right field fence for a 2-run home run, putting Miami up 5–3. Matz summarily retired the next two batters to stop the bleeding, but the damage had been done. Anthony Bender came on to close for Miami, and while Alex Bregman led off with a single and Ceddanne Rafaela walked, bringing the walk-off winning run to the plate in the form of Carlos Narváez, Bender struck out Narváez to end the game and steal a victory from the Red Sox, ending their chances at a series sweep. Boston fell to 11 games above .500 and were now tied with Seattle for the first Wild Card berth, as the New York Yankees lurked just half a game behind both teams. Boston would look to get back in the win column opening a quick two-game series on Monday against Baltimore, with Dustin May set to counter the Orioles’ Trevor Rogers.

Red Sox won the series, 2–1 (12–11 runs)

==== August 18–19, vs. Baltimore Orioles ====
In the Monday opener, Baltimore prevailed by a score of 6–3 as Trevor Rogers outpitched Dustin May. Rogers' line of just one run on four hits in seven innings pitched included eight punchouts of Red Sox batters. May went six innings and gave up two runs on eight hits with two walks while striking out five Orioles. While it was a very decent outing for May, Boston relievers Jovani Moran and Jordan Hicks each gave up two runs of their own. Gunnar Henderson had a 3rd inning solo home run and a 7th inning RBI triple, while Samuel Basallo scored on a Dylan Beavers single in the 4th and then provided a 2-RBI single in the 9th. All of Boston's three runs came off the bat of Jarren Duran, who got the Sox on the board in the bottom 7th with an RBI sac fly before hitting a 2-RBI double in the bottom of the 9th. Duran's offense proved to be too little, too late for the Sox on this day, however, and the Orioles handed the Sox their second straight loss.

On Tuesday, in the finale of this quick two-game series, Tomoyuki Sugano of the Orioles faced the Sox' Walker Buehler, though neither starter would factor in the decision. The Sox scored first when, in the 3rd, Sugano tried three times unsuccessfully to pick off a runner, which, per an MLB rule instituted in 2023, resulted in a balk that allowed Connor Wong to score from third base. The Orioles took the lead, however, with a three-run 5th. Ryan Mountcastle had an RBI single, Colton Cowser hit an RBI double that scored Luis Vázquez, and Mountcastle scored from third base on a wild pitch. In the 8th, Boston loaded the bases with no outs, but could not take advantage, as Duran, Trevor Story, and Masataka Yoshida all struck out swinging in order. The 9th began on a better note for Boston, as the Sox would tie the score at 3–3 thanks to a Nathaniel Lowe 2-run home run with Romy González on base (it was Lowe's first homer in a Red Sox uniform after being acquired off waivers from Washington the previous weekend). After Lowe's home run, Abraham Toro and Connor Wong struck out, but then Roman Anthony, Alex Bregman, and Duran all walked in succession, as Oriole reliever Yaramil Hiraldo could not find the strike zone. With the winning run 90 feet away, however, Story hit into a force out to end the inning and force extras. The O's were kept off the board in the top of the 10th by Aroldis Chapman, but in the bottom half of the inning the Red Sox wasted yet another golden opportunity. With Story as the ghost runner on second base, Yennier Cano hit Ceddanne Rafaela, putting runners on second and third. Two batters later, with one out and runners on second and third, the winning run again just 90 feet away, Toro hit into an inning-ending double play. In the 11th, Boston's inability to cash in with runners on base came back to haunt them as Baltimore took a 4–3 lead. In the bottom half of the inning, now trailing by a run, the Red Sox fought back as Wong hit a critical sac fly deep enough to advance pinch runner Nate Eaton from second to third base. The most controversial moment of the game came on the next at-bat, as Roman Anthony, batting with one out and the tying run on third base in the form of Eaton, hit a fly ball that was just deep enough to potentially score Eaton. However, the ball was caught by Colton Cowser, a Baltimore center fielder that the Red Sox coaching staff had identified before the game as an "impact arm", and Eaton began briefly to run home before being called back to remain on third. Cowser's throw to home plate was subsequently off-line, meaning the Sox' lack of risk-taking in a desperate situation wasted an opportunity to Eaton to score with ease. Bregman's pop-up in the next at-bat ended the game, and Baltimore escaped Fenway Park with a win after the Red Sox left 13 men on base. Boston's slump crept up to a three-game losing streak and their 68–59 record was now just nine games above .500. The Sox would look to right the ship by facing the redoubtable rival New York Yankees in the Bronx for a four-game series beginning Thursday. Boston had taken five of six games from the Yankees in June, and would look to replicate that success against a club with just one win more than them.

Red Sox lost the series, 0–2 (6–10 runs)

==== August 21–24, at New York Yankees ====
Neither Red Sox starter Lucas Giolito nor Yankees starter Luis Gil lasted more than five innings in a back-and-forth Thursday opener at Yankee Stadium that saw Boston pull away from a close contest late to win 6–3. The Sox benefited from three Yankee errors in the 2nd inning alone, as Masataka Yoshida reached on an error by Gil before Ceddanne Rafaela was able to reach first on a force out at second base and then scamper to second himself on a Jazz Chisholm Jr. throwing error. Rafaela then stole third base and then jogged home for the first run of the game on an error by Cohasset native Ben Rice. Rice atoned quickly for his error by taking Giolito deep for his 20th home run of the season in the bottom half of the inning, tying the game at 1–1. Paul Goldschmidt's RBI single scored Chisholm Jr. as New York took a 2–1 lead in the 4th, but the Red Sox quickly answered with more help from their new acquisition Nathaniel Lowe, who hit a sacrifice fly deep enough to score Roman Anthony, retying the contest. The Yankees pulled ahead for a 3–2 lead in the bottom of the 5th when Chisholm Jr.'s RBI single brought home Aaron Judge. In the top 6th, however, Anthony's RBI bloop single to center was enough to score David Hamilton, bringing home the tying run. After Lowe doubled to deep right field in the top 7th, scoring Trevor Story and giving the Sox the lead, Anthony punctuated his performance in style in the 9th with a no-doubt home run off of Yankee reliever Yerry De Los Santos. Anthony's 2-run bomb came with Hamilton on base and gave Boston a 6–3 advantage, which Aroldis Chapman used to record theee straight outs in the bottom 9th for his 23rd save. The win broke a three-game Red Sox losing streak and got the team off on the right foot with three games still left in the Bronx.

On Friday, Brayan Bello took the mound for the Red Sox opposite New York's Max Fried. Bello had one of his finest outings of the season, twirling seven scoreless innings and only allowing three hits and a walk while striking out five. Fried went six frames, also all scoreless, and allowed just four hits while striking out seven Red Sox. Once Fried left the game, however, Boston found an offensive opening against reliever Mark Leiter, as Nathaniel Lowe came on to pinch-hit for Nate Eaton and doubled to right field, then scored on Connor Wong's RBI double, giving the Sox a thin 1–0 lead. While the Yankees' bullpen kept Boston off the board for the remainder of the game, Boston's pitching staff remained without a blemish once Bello left the contest, with Garrett Whitlock and Chapman working the 8th and 9th innings, respectively, without allowing a single baserunner and each striking out two. Chapman slammed the door with his 24th save, and the Sox took a 2–0 series lead heading into Saturday's matinee.

If Friday was a day for a tense pitcher's duel, Saturday was a day for a certified blowout that left Yankees fans booing their own players and leaving their seats early. Ace Garrett Crochet went seven full innings, just as Bello had on Friday, and gave up just one run on five hits and a walk while punching out eleven New York hitters. Crochet's only blemish (and also the Yankees' only run) was a Giancarlo Stanton solo shot to center in the 4th. The Red Sox, on the other hand, began their assault on the Yankees in the 3rd with a Trevor Story 2-RBI double that scored Anthony and Narváez. In the 4th, Anthony's sacrifice fly scored Ceddanne Rafaela and Bregman's sac fly brought home Hamilton, and Story launched his 20th home run of the season to right field in the top 5th, giving Boston a serviceable 5–1 advantage. The team's bats were not close to done, however, as the Sox would explode for a seven-run 9th inning that included a Jarren Duran RBI single, a Lowe RBI single, a Rafaela RBI single, a Hamilton RBI single upon which Rafaela also scored courtesy of an Anthony Volpe throwing error. Narváez topped off the frame with a 2-run blast to center field to give the Sox a 12–1 lead, which Jordan Hicks easily protected for Boston's third straight victory.

In the Sunday finale, the Red Sox looked to sweep their bitter rivals on national television. Dustin May was sent to the pitcher's mound to oppose the Bronx Bombers' Carlos Rodón. May pitched a scoreless 1st, but got into trouble in subsequent innings, giving up a 2-run home run to Chisholm Jr. in the 2nd and a solo shot to Trent Grisham in the 3rd. In the 4th, José Caballero hit a sac fly deep enough to score Stanton, and Grisham got the best of May again in the 5th, hammering his second home run of the game over the short porch in right field. May recovered and struck out Aaron Judge, but then walked Ben Rice, and Alex Cora had had enough, pulling the ex-Dodger after 4 1/3 innings. May's final scoreline was five earned runs on five hits, three walks, and three strikeouts. In the meantime, Rodón had been frustrating the Boston batters, throwing five scoreless frames. In the 6th, Boston got on the board with a well-timed Nathaniel Lowe single that scored both Bregman and Romy González, making the score 5–2, but the Yanks busted the game back open with Chisholm Jr.‘a second home run of the game, a 2-run blast that came with Paul Goldschmidt on base. New York's bullpen trotted out Luke Weaver, Devin Williams, and Camilo Doval to shut down the Red Sox; the three pitchers combined to allow four hits but no runs. Having spoiled Boston's opportunity for a sweep, the Yanks escaped the series with a 7–2 victory. However, the Red Sox remained a half-game in front of the Yankees in the first wild card spot as they headed to Baltimore to refight the Orioles, who had swept a two-game series from the Sox the week prior.

Red Sox won the series, 3–1 (21–11 runs)

==== August 25–28, at Baltimore Orioles ====
The Sox opened a four-game series at Camden Yards looking to exact a measure of revenge against the O's for their two-sweep of Boston at Fenway the previous week. The Sox decided to utilize an opener strategy in the Monday night, with Brennan Bernardino pitching the first inning before giving way to Richard Fitts, recently recalled to the Red Sox from AAA Worcester, who pitched innings two through five. Fitts had a spotty outing, striking out six Orioles but also surrendering three earned runs across two hits and three walks. Thankfully, the Red Sox had gotten on the board first against Baltimore starter Tomoyuki Sugano, as Roman Anthony led off the 1st inning – and the contest – with a solo home run to right field to put Boston up 1–0. Colton Cowser tagged Fitts for a solo homer in the bottom 2nd to tie the game however, and the Orioles took the lead in the 3rd after Cowser laced a 2-RBI single to shallow center field, deep enough to score Ryan Mountcastle and Gunnar Henderson for a 3–1 Baltimore advantage. Boston answered back with a big 5th inning, however, as Connor Wong and Anthony both reached on singles and came home on a 407-foot rocket to center field off the bat of Jarren Duran, Duran's 13th home run of 2025. Although Boston would not score further, Fitts settled down to provide scoreless 4th and 5th innings before ceding to Steven Matz and Garrett Whitlock, who combined for three frames of scoreless ball. Aroldis Chapman then came on to close and retired the Baltimore side in order to lock up a 4–3 Red Sox victory. Boston bounced back from their series-closing loss to New York and now had four wins in their last five games.

Boston turned to Lucas Giolito to start the second game of the series as Baltimore sent Kyle Bradish to the bump. Giolito had perhaps his best outing of the season, going eight strong scoreless innings and only allowing four hits and one walk while fanning eight Oriole hitters. Trevor Story homered to left field off Bradish in the top 2nd to put Boston on the board, and David Hamilton added a solo long ball of his own in the 3rd. Bradish settled down afterward, however, and kept the Sox off the board for the rest of his six-inning outing. Boston got some much-needed insurance with a Carlos Narváez RBI fielder's choice that enabled Ceddanne Rafaela to scamper home. Hamilton then broke the game open with a 2-RBI double to shallow left field, deep enough to score two baserunners in Rafaela and Nathaniel Lowe. Justin Wilson was then the only reliever required, shutting down Baltimore in a non-save situation in the 9th to give the Sox their second straight win and at worst a split in the four-game set.

Wednesday evening pitted Brayan Bello against the Baltimore bullpen, with the Orioles' Dietrich Enns serving as the opener. Bello followed Giolito's Tuesday masterclass with a 6 2/3-inning slate in which he held Baltimore to two runs (one earned) across five hits while walking one and punching out five. Still, a low-scoring game from both offenses would ensure that Bello would not get the decision despite his fine performance. For the second time in three games, Roman Anthony led off the game with an instant dinger to give the Red Sox a 1–0 lead. Dylan Beavers tied it for Baltimore in the bottom 2nd by doubling home Coby Mayo. Innings 3 through 6 were scoreless, until the O's jumped ahead 2–1 on a Dylan Carlson RBI double that scored Beavers. Boston then had their backs against the wall in the top of the 9th, facing defeat against the Orioles' Keegan Akin. However, Jarren Duran led off with a bloop single, and Rafaela came to the plate and hammered a changeup from Akin 392 feet over the left-center field fence, at a stroke putting the Sox ahead 3–2. Although they still had no outs, Boston failed to add an insurance run, but would not need it, as Aroldis Chapman came on in the bottom 9th and struck out all three batters he faced to slam the door for his 26th save. Greg Weissert, who pitched the bottom of the 8th, got the win while Akin was saddled with the loss.

Boston looked to sweep the Orioles with a win in the Thursday afternoon getaway game. Ace Garrett Crochet opposed Orioles starter Cade Povich. Crochet went six strong innings, allowing two runs across six hits while racking up seven strikeouts. As with Bello the previous day, however, Boston's offense would not be enough to set up their starter for the victory. Trevor Story provided yet another 1st inning home run, a solo bomb to left, but Alex Jackson answered with a solo jack of his own in the bottom 3rd. Boston did get the run right back, with Rob Refsnyder continuing the home run derby with a solo bomb to center, his 7th of the year. Jeremiah Jackson, however, scored Alex Jackson with an RBI double in the 5th, tying the game again, and the Red Sox and Orioles were both kept off the board in the 6th and 7th. Boston scraped together their third run of the game in the top 8th by cobbling together an Anthony walk, a Storu ground out that advanced Anthony to second, and a Romy González single that allowed Anthony to race to the plate from second base. Up 3–2 late for the second straight game, Boston got a one-hit inning from Garrett Whitlock and, wanting to give Chapman a day of rest, got another one-run frame from Steven Matz, good enough to lock up the victory and the four-game sweep. Jordan Hicks was credited with the win as Matz collected the save, his second. The Red Sox would board a plane back to Boston awaiting a weekend series against the Pittsburgh Pirates coming off a 7–1 run road trip that left the club at a season-high 15 games above .500.

Red Sox won the series, 4–0 (15–7 runs)

==== August 29–31, vs Pittsburgh Pirates ====
The Red Sox came home floating on a 7–1 record in their New York and Baltimore road trip, and, with a rotation spot open after Boston released Walker Buehler, the club sent Worcester call-up Payton Tolle to the hill to make his major-league debut. Tolle flashed a brilliant, if brief, sneak peek at his potential, throwing five scoreless innings and lasting 5 1/3 innings while giving up two earned runs on just three hits and two walks while striking out eight Pittsburgh hitters. Unfortunately for Tolle, the Sox' offense, which had benefited in the Baltimore series from a poor opposing offense and being backed up sterling starting pitching, continued to struggle to manufacture runs, and on this night the Red Sox bats were up against Pirates wunderkind Paul Skenes. Skenes was at advertised in his first career start at Fenway Park, going six innings and, despite scattering seven hits, allowing just two runs (one earned) while fanning six Red Sox. The scoring didn't begin until the bottom 4th, when Ceddanne Rafaela's infield single coupled with an Isiah Kiner-Falefa throwing error enabled Masataka Yoshida to score. In the 5th, Roman Anthony took Skenes deep for his eighth home run of the year, a solo bomb to right that made it 2–0 Boston. However, as Tolle began pitching the third time through the Pirates' order in the 6th, the seeds for a Pittsburgh rally would be planted. Tolle began the inning by inducing a lineout, but was pulled after giving up consecutive singles to Nick Gonzales and Bryan Reynolds, giving way to reliever Greg Weissert. Tommy Pham immediately hit a 2-RBI double to tie the game, and Andrew McCutchen's RBI double gave the Pirates the lead in the wink of an eye. Weissert was able to stanch the bleeding and keep Pittsburgh's output to three runs on the inning, but Skenes pitched one more scoreless frame before the Pirates cobbled together a bullpen run of Dauri Moreta, Isaac Mattson, and Dennis Santana that would allow just three Sox baserunners for the rest of the game. Henry Davis brought home Ronny Simon on a sac bunt in the top of the 8th, scraping together a critical insurance run, and Santana's 11th save ended Boston's four-game win streak with a 4–2 Pirates victory for which Skenes was credited with the win and Weissert was charged with the loss, as Tolle earned a no-decision in his first big league start.

The Red Sox sent Dustin May to the mound in the middle game on Saturday opposite Pittsburgh's Johan Oviedo, but the trade deadline acquisition for Boston again struggled, going 5 1/3 innings and surrendering seven runs (six earned) on eight hits while striking out five but also walking four. The Pirates scratched out a run in the top 1st to take a 1–0 lead, but the Sox bounced back with a Carlos Narváez solo home run and a Romy González RBI single in the 3rd and 4th, respectively. It was in the top 5th that things began to unravel for May as he attempted to protect a 2–1 advantage. Reynolds tagged May for a 2-RBI single that put the Pirates back in top with one swing of the bat, and Pham laced an RBI single to left to make it 4–2. In the 6th, May gave up an Oneil Cruz solo bomb and a Joey Bart double before inducing a strikeout and a walk, at which point May was pulled in favor of Brennan Bernardino. Spencer Horwitz’s RBI single made it 6–2, and then 7–2 as Bart scored on a Sox error. Nick Gonzales then provided a 2-RBI single with the bases loaded to break the game open at 9–2. The Pirates' bullpen kept Boston mostly off the board in the late innings, and Pittsburgh added one more in the 9th as Pittsburgh locked up the series with a 10–3 victory.

The Red Sox salvaged the Sunday finale, 5–2, as Lucas Giolito went six strong innings while allowing just one run on three hits and striking put six Pirates. Boston got RBIs in the 5th from a Roman Anthony ground out with two men on and a hit from Jarren Duran with two on that the Pittsburgh defense lost in the Triangle, allowing Duran to not only score both runners but to race all the way around the basepaths himself for the first Red Sox inside-the-park home run at Fenway since 2011 (Jacoby Ellsbury). Boston followed up their four-run frame with a Ceddanne Rafaela RBI single in the 6th. Pittsburgh drew to within three runs on an Alexander Canario blast in the top 7th, but Garrett Whitlock and Aroldis Chapman stifled any further comeback attempts, with Chapman earning his 27th save in shutting the door on the 5–2 victory.

Series result: Red Sox 1–2 Pirates (10–16 runs)

=== September ===
September game summaries

==== September 1–3, vs Cleveland Guardians ====
Boston hosted a Monday Labor Day matinee to kick off their series against the Guardians, sending Brayan Bello to the mound to oppose Cleveland's Parker Messick. Bello went five innings and gave up three earned runs on six hits while walking three and striking out three; all of Cleveland's runs against Bello came in the second inning. The Red Sox led after the bottom 1st, 2–0, thanks to Roman Anthony advancing from third base on a Messick balk and Romy González singling in Alex Bregman. After the Guardians went ahead with a three-run 2nd, Trevor Story singled in Connor Wong to tie the game. Carlos Narváez's 2-RBI pinch-hit single in the 5th broke the deadlock, and a Story solo homer made the score 6–3. A Kyle Manzardo homer for Cleveland pulled the Guards within a pair, but Chapman again racked up the save – his 28th – to secure a 6–4 win. In the middle game on Tuesday, the feel of the game swung wildly as the Sox racked up a 5–1 lead after three innings, but then allowed a six-run top of the 6th from Cleveland to turn the game on its head, before Boston put together a two-run bottom 6th and a four-run bottom 8th to put the final score at 11–7. Key offensive moments for the Sox included Nathaniel Lowe's 18th home run of 2025, a Ceddanne Rafaela two-run bomb that came with Masataka Yoshida on base in the 6th, and an RBI single, an RBI double, and a 2-RBI double from Alex Bregman, Jarren Duran, and Story, respectively. Ace Garrett Crochet struggled to find his usual form for Boston, allowing seven runs on nine hits across six innings of work. Cleveland's Slade Cecconi went 5 1/3 innings while surrendering seven earned runs on eleven hits. The finale on Wednesday was all Cleveland, as the Sox attempted to stitch together a bullpen game headed by opener Brennan Bernardino, but to no avail (Bernardino only lasted two-thirds of an inning). José Ramírez got the Guardians on the board right away by hitting into an RBI ground out to bring home Steven Kwan. In the top of the 2nd, facing Jordan Hicks, Gabriel Arias sent a pitch over the center field wall for a 2-run blast, and Kwan hit an RBI single to make it 4–0 Cleveland. The Sox' second-inning woes were not nearly over, however, as Ramírez reached base on a catcher interference error, enabling Brayan Rocchio to score, and Kwan scampered home a second time on a wild pitch. Manzardo then singled and was tagged out trying to advance to second, but not before Ramírez scored to make it a 7–0 game after just two frames. Nick Sogard's RBI single in the 4th got the goose eggs off the scoreboard for the Red Sox, but a CJ Kayfus RBI sac fly restored the Guardians' seven-run advantage as they salvaged the final game of the series, 8–1.

Red Sox won the series, 2–1 (18–19 runs)

==== September 5–7, at Arizona Diamondbacks ====
Red Sox lost the series, 1–2 (13–19 runs)

==== September 8–10, at Athletics ====
This series was played at Sutter Health Park in West Sacramento, California, the temporary home of the Athletics prior to their move to Las Vegas in 2028. The Red Sox shut out the Athletics in both the Monday opener and Tuesday middle game. Connelly Early made his major league debut in the Tuesday affair, twirling five innings of scoreless, five-hit baseball punctuated by eleven strikeouts in 21 total batters faced. The Athletics salvaged the series, however, with a walk-off win in the Wednesday matinee, with Lawrence Butler singling in Shea Langeliers against closer Aroldis Chapman. The walk-off marked the first hit and first run allowed by Chapman since July 23, ending a 50-batter hitless streak.

Red Sox won the series, 2–1 (17–5 runs)

==== September 12–14, vs New York Yankees ====
The Red Sox hosted the Yankees for the final regular season series between the rivals in 2025. The Yankees, who had lost 8 of 10 games to Boston over the first three series, rebounded to win the closing slate by taking the Friday opener and Saturday middle game by respective scores of 4–1 and 5–3. Lucas Giolito and Brayan Bello were saddled with the losses in the first two contests, although both pitchers scattered just five hits each. Boston's bats were stifled on both days, first by New York starter Luis Gil, who pitched six innings while walking four but did not give up a hit, and then by Max Fried, who went 5 1/3 and gave up nine hits but just two runs. Aaron Judge's first-inning home run on Friday was the 362nd of his career as he surpassed Joe DiMaggio for fourth on the all-time Yankees franchise home run list. On Saturday, Jazz Chisholm Jr. starred for New York, hitting RBI singles in the 1st and 3rd and a solo home run in the 5th. The Red Sox made a comeback attempt in the second half of the game against the Yankee bullpen, with Alex Bregman and Jarren Duran sending solo homers to right field in the 5th and 8th innings, respectively, but the damage had been done. Sunday's nationally televised finale brought happier returns for the Red Sox – Garrett Crochet went six innings, and though he surrendered three runs on five hits, he also struck out twelve Yankee hitters. All of Boston's six runs came in a first-inning onslaught against Yankee starter Will Warren, and included a Duran triple, a Bregman RBI single, a Nathaniel Lowe RBI single, a Romy González RBI double, and was capped off by the 14th home run of the season for Carlos Narváez. The Red Sox' record stood at 82–68 after the Yankee series as the Sox would enter a critical series against the Athletics at Fenway before embarking on a road trip within the AL East.

Red Sox lost the series, 1–2 (10–13 runs)

==== September 16–18, vs Athletics ====
Connelly Early got his second major league start in the first of this three-game series, and once again pitched well for Boston, giving up one earned run in 5 1/3 innings pitched. Despite a good performance from Early and Boston's relief pitching staff giving up only one additional run (a single from Brett Harris to drive in Tyler Soderstrom), the Red Sox could not secure a victory, scoring only one run off a Carlos Narváez double and Lawrence Butler fielding error. Ultimately, the Sox lost the game 2–1 due to dominant pitching performances from the Athletics' Jeffrey Springs, Mitch Spence, and Hogan Harris.

Tuesday's contest got off to a shaky start for Lucas Giolito, giving up four runs on five hits in only 4 1/3 innings pitched. However, the Red Sox kept the game competitive by scoring three runs off Athletics starter Mason Barnett, thanks to a pair of RBI singles by Masataka Yoshida and a solo homer by Rob Refsnyder. An RBI single by Trevor Story in the sixth inning knotted the game at four runs apiece. The game remained tied until the bottom of the 10th inning, with began with an intentional walk for Nathaniel Lowe and a Carlos Narváez sacrifice bunt to move ghostrunner Nate Eaton to third base. Nick Sogard came in to pinch-hit for Ceddanne Rafaela, who had been struggling at the plate. A ground-ball fielders' choice from Sogard allowed Eaton to score, and the Red Sox won 5–4, evening up the series.

Brayan Bello started the final game of the series for the Sox, but like Giolito, struggled on the mound, giving up four runs (three earned) in four innings. Payton Tolle, in his first major league relief appearance, pitched three innings and gave up one unearned run, and Greg Weissert kept the game scoreless through the final two innings. Offensively, the Red Sox were unable to catch up to the A's, scoring only three runs on a sacrifice fly by Masataka Yoshida and solo homers by David Hamilton and Trevor Story (his twenty-fifth of the season). The Sox lost the game 5–3, losing the series two games to one.

Red Sox lost the series, 1–2 (9–11 runs)

==== September 19–21, at Tampa Bay Rays ====
Red Sox won the series, 2–1 (20–17 runs)

==== September 23–25, at Toronto Blue Jays ====
Red Sox won the series, 2–1 (12–8 runs)

==== September 26–28, vs Detroit Tigers ====
Red Sox won the series, 2–1 (9–8 runs)

== Season standings ==
=== American League East ===
AL East
Team	W	L	Pct.	GB	Home	Road
Toronto Blue Jays	94	68	.580	—	54‍–‍27	40‍–‍41
New York Yankees	94	68	.580	—	50‍–‍31	44‍–‍37
Boston Red Sox	89	73	.549	5	48‍–‍33	41‍–‍40
Tampa Bay Rays	77	85	.475	17	41‍–‍40	36‍–‍45
Baltimore Orioles	75	87	.463	19	39‍–‍42	36‍–‍45

=== American League Wild Card ===
Division leaders
Team	W	L	Pct.
Toronto Blue Jays	94	68	.580
Seattle Mariners	90	72	.556
Cleveland Guardians	88	74	.543

Wild Card teams (Top 3 teams qualify for postseason)
Team	W	L	Pct.	GB
New York Yankees	94	68	.580	+7
Boston Red Sox	89	73	.549	+2
Detroit Tigers	87	75	.537	—
Houston Astros	87	75	.537	—
Kansas City Royals	82	80	.506	5
Texas Rangers	81	81	.500	6
Tampa Bay Rays	77	85	.475	10
Athletics	76	86	.469	11
Baltimore Orioles	75	87	.463	12
Los Angeles Angels	72	90	.444	15
Minnesota Twins	70	92	.432	17
Chicago White Sox	60	102	.370	27

=== Record vs. opponents ===
==== Record vs. American League ====
2025 American League record Source: MLB Standings Grid – 2025
Team	ATH	BAL	BOS	CWS	CLE	DET	HOU	KC	LAA	MIN	NYY	SEA	TB	TEX	TOR	NL
Athletics	—	4–2	3–3	5–1	2–4	4–2	8–5	4–2	4–9	4–3	2–4	6–7	3–3	5–8	2–5	20–28
Baltimore	2–4	—	5–8	6–0	3–4	1–5	3–4	2–4	5–1	0–6	4–9	5–1	7–6	2–4	6–7	24–24
Boston	3–3	8–5	—	4–3	4–2	2–4	4–2	4–2	1–5	3–3	9–4	3–3	10–3	3–4	5–8	26–22
Chicago	1–5	0–6	3–4	—	2–11	5–8	3–3	3–10	3–3	8–5	1–6	1–5	4–2	2–4	3–3	21–27
Cleveland	4–2	4–3	2–4	11–2	—	8–5	4–2	8–5	3–3	9–4	3–3	2–4	5–2	2–4	3–3	20–28
Detroit	2–4	5–1	4–2	8–5	5–8	—	4–2	9–4	5–2	8–5	4–2	2–4	3–3	2–4	3–4	23–25
Houston	5–8	4–3	2–4	3–3	2–4	2–4	—	3–3	8–5	5–1	3-3	5–8	3–4	7–6	4–2	31–17
Kansas City	2–4	4–2	2–4	10–3	5–8	4–9	3–3	—	3–3	7–6	0–6	3–4	3–3	6-1	4–2	26–22
Los Angeles	9–4	1–5	5–1	3–3	3–3	2–5	5–8	3–3	—	2–4	3–4	4–9	3–3	5–8	2–4	22–26
Minnesota	3–4	6–0	3–3	5–8	4–9	5–8	1–5	6–7	4–2	—	2–4	3–4	3–3	3–3	2–4	20–28
New York	4–2	9–4	4–9	6–1	3–3	2–4	3–3	6–0	4–3	4–2	—	5–1	9–4	4–2	5–8	26–22
Seattle	7–6	1–5	3–3	5–1	4–2	4–2	8–5	4–3	9–4	4–3	1–5	—	3–3	10–3	2–4	25–23
Tampa Bay	3–3	6–7	3–10	2–4	2–5	3–3	4–3	3–3	3–3	3–3	4–9	3–3	—	3–3	7–6	28–20
Texas	8–5	4–2	4–3	4–2	4–2	4–2	6–7	1-6	8–5	3–3	2–4	3–10	3–3	—	2–4	25–23
Toronto	5–2	7–6	8–5	3–3	3–3	4–3	2–4	2–4	4–2	4–2	8–5	4–2	6–7	4–2	—	30–18

Updated with the results of all games through September 28, 2025.

==== Record vs. National League ====
2025 American League record vs. National League Source: MLB Standings
Team	AZ	ATL	CHC	CIN	COL	LAD	MIA	MIL	NYM	PHI	PIT	SD	SF	STL	WSH
Athletics	1–2	2–1	0–3	3–0	2–1	1–2	2–1	1–2	1–2	1–2	1–2	1–2	1–5	1–2	2–1
Baltimore	1–2	3–0	1–2	1–2	2–1	2–1	1–2	1–2	2–1	1–2	3–0	3–0	1–2	1–2	1–5
Boston	1–2	3–3	1–2	2–1	3–0	2–1	2–1	0–3	2–1	1–2	1–2	1–2	1–2	3–0	3–0
Chicago	1–2	1–2	1–5	2–1	2–1	0–3	2–1	1–2	1–2	2–1	3–0	1–2	2–1	0–3	2–1
Cleveland	1–2	0–3	0–3	1–5	2–1	1–2	2–1	2–1	3–0	1–2	3–0	0–3	2–1	0–3	2–1
Detroit	3–0	0–3	2–1	1–2	3–0	0–3	1–2	1–2	1–2	1–2	2–4	2–1	3–0	2–1	1–2
Houston	3–0	2–1	2–1	2–1	4–2	3–0	2–1	1–2	2–1	3–0	2–1	2–1	0–3	1–2	2–1
Kansas City	2–1	2–1	2–1	1–2	3–0	1–2	1–2	1–2	1–2	1–2	3–0	1–2	2–1	3–3	2–1
Los Angeles	2–1	2–1	0–3	1–2	1–2	6–0	1–2	0–3	0–3	2–1	1–2	1–2	2–1	2–1	1–2
Minnesota	1–2	0–3	2–1	1–2	1–2	1–2	1–2	2–4	2–1	1–2	2–1	2–1	3–0	0–3	1–2
New York	1–2	2–1	1–2	1–2	2–1	1–2	0–3	3–0	3–3	1–2	2–1	2–1	1–2	3–0	3–0
Seattle	0–3	2–1	2–1	2–1	3–0	0–3	2–1	1–2	1–2	0–3	3–0	5–1	0–3	3–0	1–2
Tampa Bay	2–1	2–1	1–2	0–3	2–1	1–2	3–3	2–1	3–0	0–3	2–1	3–0	2–1	2–1	3–0
Texas	2–4	3–0	1–2	2–1	3–0	1–2	0–3	3–0	2–1	0–3	2–1	1–2	1–2	2–1	2–1
Toronto	2–1	2–1	2–1	2–1	3–0	1–2	2–1	1–2	0–3	2–4	1–2	3–0	3–0	3–0	3–0

Updated with the results of all games through September 28, 2025.

== Game log ==
Red Sox Win	Red Sox Loss	Game postponed	Clinched Playoff Spot

2025 Boston Red Sox Season Game Log: 89–73 (Home: 48–33; Away: 41–40)
March / April: 17–15 (Home: 8–6; Away: 9–9)

#	Date	Opponent	Score	Win	Loss	Save	Stadium	Attendance	Record	Box/ Streak
1	March 27	@ Rangers	5–2	Chapman (1–0)	Jackson (0–1)	Slaten (1)	Globe Life Field	37,587	1–0	W1
2	March 28	@ Rangers	1–4	Leiter (1–0)	Houck (0–1)	Jackson (1)	Globe Life Field	26,766	1–1	L1
3	March 29	@ Rangers	3–4	Milner (1–0)	Buehler (0–1)	Martin (1)	Globe Life Field	32,251	1–2	L2
4	March 30	@ Rangers	2–3	Armstrong (1–0)	Fitts (0–1)	Jackson (2)	Globe Life Field	29,137	1–3	L3
5	March 31	@ Orioles	5–8	Domínguez (1–0)	Newcomb (0–1)	—	Camden Yards	45,002	1–4	L4
6	April 2	@ Orioles	3–0	Crochet (1–0)	Eflin (1–1)	Chapman (1)	Camden Yards	18,146	2–4	W1
7	April 3	@ Orioles	8–4	Kelly (1–0)	Morton (0–2)	—	Camden Yards	16,656	3–4	W2
8	April 4	Cardinals	13–9	Buehler (1–1)	Fedde (1–1)	Chapman (2)	Fenway Park	36,462	4–4	W3
–	April 5	Cardinals	Postponed due to rain. Makeup date April 6.							
9	April 6 (1)	Cardinals	5–4 (10)	Chapman (2–0)	Fernandez (0–1)	—	Fenway Park	31,495	5–4	W4
10	April 6 (2)	Cardinals	18–7	Dobbins (1–0)	Mikolas (0–1)	Criswell (1)	Fenway Park	28,276	6–4	W5
11	April 7	Blue Jays	2–6	Berríos (1–1)	Fitts (0–2)	—	Fenway Park	25,788	6–5	L1
12	April 8	Blue Jays	1–6	Lucas (2–0)	Crochet (1–1)	—	Fenway Park	25,575	6–6	L2
13	April 9	Blue Jays	1–2 (11)	Hoffman (1–0)	Winckowski (0–1)	Sandlin (1)	Fenway Park	29,441	6–7	L3
14	April 10	Blue Jays	4–3 (10)	Bernardino (1–0)	Sandlin (0–2)	—	Fenway Park	25,128	7–7	W1
15	April 11	@ White Sox	1–11	Martin (1–1)	Newcomb (0–2)	—	Rate Field	13,432	7–8	L1
16	April 12	@ White Sox	2–3	Gilbert (1–0)	Chapman (2–1)	—	Rate Field	30,423	7–9	L2
17	April 13	@ White Sox	3–1	Crochet (2–1)	Smith (0–1)	Chapman (3)	Rate Field	18,840	8–9	W1
18	April 14	@ Rays	1–16	Baz (2–0)	Houck (0–2)	—	George M. Steinbrenner Field	10,046	8–10	L1
19	April 15	@ Rays	7–4	Buehler (2–1)	Pepiot (1–2)	Chapman (4)	George M. Steinbrenner Field	10,046	9–10	W1
20	April 16	@ Rays	1–0	Weissert (1–0)	Littell (0–4)	Slaten (2)	George M. Steinbrenner Field	10,046	10–10	W2
21	April 18	White Sox	10–3	Dobbins (2–0)	Pérez (1–1)	—	Fenway Park	35,620	11–10	W3
22	April 19	White Sox	4–3 (10)	Whitlock (1–0)	Vasil (0–1)	—	Fenway Park	36,559	12–10	W4
23	April 20	White Sox	4–8	Eisert (1–0)	Kelly (1–1)	—	Fenway Park	32,632	12–11	L1
24	April 21	White Sox	4–2	Buehler (3–1)	Cannon (0–3)	Slaten (3)	Fenway Park	34,721	13–11	W1
25	April 22	Mariners	8–3	Bello (1–0)	Miller (1–3)	—	Fenway Park	33,027	14–11	W2
26	April 23	Mariners	5–8	Hancock (1–1)	Newcomb (0–3)	Muñoz (8)	Fenway Park	31,904	14–12	L1
27	April 24	Mariners	3–4	Woo (3–1)	Crochet (2–2)	Muñoz (9)	Fenway Park	35,655	14–13	L2
―	April 25	@ Guardians	Postponed due to rain. Makeup date April 26.							
28	April 26 (1)	@ Guardians	4–5	Herrin (3–0)	Bernardino (1–1)	Smith (3)	Progressive Field	17,367	14–14	L3
29	April 26 (2)	@ Guardians	7–3	Buehler (4–1)	Nikhazy (0–1)	—	Progressive Field	24,316	15–14	W1
30	April 27	@ Guardians	13–3	Bello (2–0)	Allen (1–2)	—	Progressive Field	24,621	16–14	W2
31	April 29	@ Blue Jays	10–2	Crochet (3–2)	Francis (2–4)	—	Rogers Centre	28,045	17–14	W3
32	April 30	@ Blue Jays	6–7 (10)	Hoffman (3–0)	Slaten (0–1)	—	Rogers Centre	26,498	17–15	L1

May: 11–17 (Home: 8–8; Away: 3–9)

#	Date	Opponent	Score	Win	Loss	Save	Stadium	Attendance	Record	Box/ Streak
33	May 1	@ Blue Jays	2–4	Fluharty (2–0)	Slaten (0–2)	García (2)	Rogers Centre	24,198	17–16	L2
34	May 2	Twins	6–1	Wilson (1–0)	Varland (1–3)	—	Fenway Park	35,914	18–16	W1
35	May 3	Twins	3–4	Ober (4–1)	Dobbins (2–1)	Durán (3)	Fenway Park	36,250	18–17	L1
36	May 4	Twins	4–5	Varland (2–3)	Slaten (0–3)	Durán (4)	Fenway Park	33,539	18–18	L2
37	May 6	Rangers	1–6	Eovaldi (3–2)	Giolito (0–1)	—	Fenway Park	29,858	18–19	L3
38	May 7	Rangers	6–4	Bernardino (2–1)	Webb (2–2)	Chapman (5)	Fenway Park	31,437	19–19	W1
39	May 8	Rangers	5–0	Slaten (1–3)	Leiter (2–2)	—	Fenway Park	27,800	20–19	W2
40	May 9	@ Royals	1–2 (12)	Cruz (1–0)	Newcomb (0–4)	—	Kauffman Stadium	30,348	20–20	L1
41	May 10	@ Royals	10–1	Crochet (4–2)	Ragans (2–2)	—	Kauffman Stadium	29,460	21–20	W1
42	May 11	@ Royals	3–1	Giolito (1–1)	Lugo (3–4)	Chapman (6)	Kauffman Stadium	25,785	22–20	W2
43	May 12	@ Tigers	2–14	Jobe (3–0)	Houck (0–3)	—	Comerica Park	20,136	22–21	L1
44	May 13	@ Tigers	9–10 (11)	Brieske (1–1)	Weissert (1–1)	—	Comerica Park	20,115	22–22	L2
45	May 14	@ Tigers	5–6	Vest (3–0)	Chapman (2–2)	—	Comerica Park	21,013	22–23	L3
46	May 16	Braves	2–4	Sale (2–3)	Crochet (4–3)	Iglesias (8)	Fenway Park	34,648	22–24	L4
47	May 17	Braves	7–6	Chapman (3–2)	Johnson (1–1)	—	Fenway Park	34,594	23–24	W1
48	May 18	Braves	4–10	Schwellenbach (3–3)	Bello (2–1)	—	Fenway Park	35,012	23–25	L1
49	May 19	Mets	3–1	Wilson (2–0)	Senga (4–3)	Chapman (7)	Fenway Park	33,548	24–25	W1
50	May 20	Mets	2–0	Whitlock (2–0)	Holmes (5–3)	Chapman (8)	Fenway Park	33,208	25–25	W2
51	May 21	Mets	1–5	Brazobán (3–0)	Hendriks (0–1)	—	Fenway Park	31,661	25–26	L1
―	May 22	Orioles	Postponed due to rain. Makeup date May 23.							
52	May 23 (1)	Orioles	19–5	Whitlock (3–0)	Domínguez (2–1)	—	Fenway Park	31,150	26–26	W1
―	May 23 (2)	Orioles	Postponed due to rain. Makeup date May 24.							
53	May 24 (1)	Orioles	6–5 (10)	Weissert (2–1)	Soto (0–2)	—	Fenway Park	30,958	27–26	W2
54	May 24 (2)	Orioles	1–2	Kittredge (1–0)	Bernardino (2–2)	Domínguez (1)	Fenway Park	34,604	27–27	L1
55	May 25	Orioles	1–5	Kremer (4–5)	Buehler (4–2)	—	Fenway Park	36,824	27–28	L2
56	May 26	@ Brewers	2–3	Hall (1–0)	Crochet (4–4)	Megill (10)	American Family Field	40,181	27–29	L3
57	May 27	@ Brewers	1–5 (10)	Zastryzny (1–0)	Hendriks (0–2)	—	American Family Field	26,489	27–30	L4
58	May 28	@ Brewers	5–6 (10)	Alexander (3–5)	Slaten (1–4)	—	American Family Field	24,603	27–31	L5
59	May 30	@ Braves	5–1	Whitlock (4–0)	Holmes (3–4)	—	Truist Park	39,842	28–31	W1
60	May 31	@ Braves	0–5	Schwellenbach (4–4)	Buehler (4–3)	—	Truist Park	41,444	28–32	L1

June: 14–12 (Home: 8–5; Away: 6–7)

#	Date	Opponent	Score	Win	Loss	Save	Stadium	Attendance	Record	Box/ Streak
61	June 1	@ Braves	3–1	Crochet (5–4)	Elder (2–3)	Chapman (9)	Truist Park	38,279	29–32	W1
62	June 2	Angels	6–7	Zeferjahn (3–1)	Fitts (0–3)	Jansen (12)	Fenway Park	31,688	29–33	L1
63	June 3	Angels	3–4 (10)	Jansen (1–2)	Kelly (1–2)	Detmers (1)	Fenway Park	33,003	29–34	L2
64	June 4	Angels	11–9	Criswell (1–0)	Burke (4–1)	—	Fenway Park	33,073	30–34	W1
65	June 6	@ Yankees	6–9	Warren (4–3)	Buehler (4–4)	Williams (7)	Yankee Stadium	46,783	30–35	L1
66	June 7	@ Yankees	10–7	Crochet (6–4)	Yarbrough (3–1)	Chapman (10)	Yankee Stadium	47,020	31–35	W1
67	June 8	@ Yankees	11–7	Dobbins (3–1)	Rodón (8–4)	Chapman (11)	Yankee Stadium	45,140	32–35	W2
68	June 9	Rays	8–10 (11)	Seymour (1–0)	Kelly (1–3)	—	Fenway Park	31,422	32–36	L1
69	June 10	Rays	3–1	Giolito (2–1)	Pepiot (3–6)	Weissert (1)	Fenway Park	31,917	33–36	W1
70	June 11	Rays	4–3	Buehler (5–4)	Littell (6–6)	Chapman (12)	Fenway Park	36,003	34–36	W2
71	June 13	Yankees	2–1 (10)	Whitlock (5–0)	Hill (3–2)	—	Fenway Park	36,622	35–36	W3
72	June 14	Yankees	4–3	Dobbins (4–1)	Rodón (8–5)	Weissert (2)	Fenway Park	36,414	36–36	W4
73	June 15	Yankees	2–0	Bello (3–1)	Fried (9–2)	Whitlock (1)	Fenway Park	36,475	37–36	W5
74	June 16	@ Mariners	2–0	Giolito (3–1)	Gilbert (1–2)	Chapman (13)	T-Mobile Park	24,490	38–36	W6
75	June 17	@ Mariners	0–8	Woo (6–4)	Buehler (5–5)	—	T-Mobile Park	26,974	38–37	L1
76	June 18	@ Mariners	3–1	Crochet (7–4)	Castillo (4–5)	Weissert (3)	T-Mobile Park	32,200	39–37	W1
77	June 20	@ Giants	7–5	Bernardino (3–2)	Hjelle (1–1)	Chapman (14)	Oracle Park	40,169	40–37	W2
78	June 21	@ Giants	2–3	Roupp (5–5)	Bello (3–2)	Doval (12)	Oracle Park	39,027	40–38	L1
79	June 22	@ Giants	5–9	Miller (4–0)	Weissert (2–2)	—	Oracle Park	40,350	40–39	L2
80	June 23	@ Angels	5–9	Bachman (1–0)	Whitlock (5–1)	—	Angel Stadium	30,137	40–40	L3
81	June 24	@ Angels	2–3 (10)	Detmers (3–2)	Wilson (2–1)	—	Angel Stadium	33,115	40–41	L4
82	June 25	@ Angels	2–5	Kikuchi (3–6)	Guerrero (0–1)	Zeferjahn (2)	Angel Stadium	28,301	40–42	L5
83	June 27	Blue Jays	0–9	Berríos (4–3)	Bello (3–3)	—	Fenway Park	35,719	40–43	L6
84	June 28	Blue Jays	15–1	Giolito (4–1)	Bassitt (7–4)	—	Fenway Park	34,927	41–43	W1
85	June 29	Blue Jays	3–5	Rodríguez (2–0)	Buehler (5–6)	Hoffman (18)	Fenway Park	35,214	41–44	L1
86	June 30	Reds	13–6	Crochet (8–4)	Burns (0–1)	—	Fenway Park	35,691	42–44	W1

July: 17–7 (Home: 10–2; Away: 7–5)

#	Date	Opponent	Score	Win	Loss	Save	Stadium	Attendance	Record	Box/ Streak
87	July 1 (Note: The July 1 game was suspended due to rain in the top of the fourth inning with the Red Sox leading 2–1; it was completed before the regularly scheduled game on July 2.)	Reds	5–3	Bello (4–3)	Richardson (0–3)	Chapman (15)	Fenway Park	32,355	43–44	W2
88	July 2	Reds	4–8	Martinez (6–8)	Weissert (2–3)	—	Fenway Park	35,845	43–45	L1
89	July 4	@ Nationals	11–2	Giolito (5–1)	Soroka (3–6)	—	Nationals Park	37,355	44–45	W1
90	July 5	@ Nationals	10–3	Buehler (6–6)	Parker (5–9)	—	Nationals Park	34,319	45–45	W2
91	July 6	@ Nationals	6–4	Crochet (9–4)	Ogasawara (0–1)	Hicks (1)	Nationals Park	26,771	46–45	W3
92	July 7	Rockies	9–3	Fitts (1–3)	Gomber (0–2)	—	Fenway Park	32,441	47–45	W4
93	July 8	Rockies	10–2	Bello (5–3)	Freeland (1–10)	—	Fenway Park	30,169	48–45	W5
94	July 9	Rockies	10–2	Giolito (6–1)	Senzatela (3–13)	—	Fenway Park	31,691	49–45	W6
95	July 10	Rays	4–3	Murphy (1–0)	Baker (3–3)	Chapman (16)	Fenway Park	31,884	50–45	W7
96	July 11	Rays	5–4	Murphy (2–0)	Fairbanks (4–3)	—	Fenway Park	34,452	51–45	W8
97	July 12	Rays	1–0	Crochet (10–4)	Baz (8–5)	—	Fenway Park	36,453	52–45	W9
98	July 13	Rays	4–1	Bello (6–3)	Pepiot (6–7)	Chapman (17)	Fenway Park	36,497	53–45	W10
ASG	July 15	All-Star Game	AL 6 – 6 NL^{*}	–	–	–	Truist Park	41,702	—	ASG
^{*}No extra innings were played; the National League was declared the winner after winning a home run swing-off 4–3.
The Red Sox were represented by Aroldis Chapman, Garrett Crochet, and Alex Bregman. Only Chapman played.
99	July 18	@ Cubs	1–4	Rea (8–3)	Giolito (6–2)	Palencia (13)	Wrigley Field	41,011	53–46	L1
100	July 19	@ Cubs	0–6	Imanaga (7–3)	Bello (6–4)	—	Wrigley Field	40,703	53–47	L2
101	July 20	@ Cubs	6–1	Crochet (11–4)	Pressly (2–3)	—	Wrigley Field	40,433	54–47	W1
102	July 21	@ Phillies	2–3 (10)	Lazar (1–0)	Hicks (1–6)	—	Citizens Bank Park	42,843	54–48	L1
103	July 22	@ Phillies	1–4	Sánchez (9–2)	Fitts (1–4)	—	Citizens Bank Park	43,409	54–49	L2
104	July 23	@ Phillies	9–8 (11)	Weissert (3–3)	Johnson (1–1)	Bernardino (1)	Citizens Bank Park	42,601	55–49	W1
105	July 25	Dodgers	2–5	Sheehan (2–1)	Bello (6–5)	Casparius (1)	Fenway Park	36,369	55–50	L1
106	July 26	Dodgers	4–2	Crochet (12–4)	Kershaw (4–2)	Chapman (17)	Fenway Park	36,687	56–50	W1
107	July 27	Dodgers	4–3	Bernardino (4–2)	May (6–7)	Hicks (2)	Fenway Park	35,465	57–50	W2
108	July 28	@ Twins	4–5	Durán (6–4)	Hicks (1–7)	—	Target Field	24,443	57–51	L1
109	July 29	@ Twins	8–5	Giolito (7–2)	Ohl (0–1)	Chapman (19)	Target Field	27,460	58–51	W1
110	July 30	@ Twins	13–1	Bello (7–5)	Matthews (2–3)	—	Target Field	29,146	59–51	W2

August: 17–11 (Home: 8–6; Away: 9–5)

#	Date	Opponent	Score	Win	Loss	Save	Stadium	Attendance	Record	Box/ Streak
111	August 1	Astros	2–1 (10)	Weissert (4–3)	Sousa (5–1)	—	Fenway Park	36,881	60–51	W3
112	August 2	Astros	7–3	Wilson (3–1)	Gordon (4–4)	Chapman (20)	Fenway Park	36,215	61–51	W4
113	August 3	Astros	6–1	Giolito (8–2)	Valdez (11–5)	—	Fenway Park	36,081	62–51	W5
114	August 4	Royals	8–5	Bello (8–5)	Falter (7–6)	Chapman (21)	Fenway Park	37,585	63–51	W6
115	August 5	Royals	6–2	Crochet (13–4)	Bergert (1–1)	—	Fenway Park	37,013	64–51	W7
116	August 6	Royals	3–7	Wacha (6–9)	May (6–8)	—	Fenway Park	37,012	64–52	L1
117	August 8	@ Padres	10–2	Buehler (7–6)	Pivetta (11–4)	—	Petco Park	44,061	65–52	W1
118	August 9	@ Padres	4–5 (10)	Adam (7–3)	Whitlock (5–2)	—	Petco Park	42,389	65–53	L1
119	August 10	@ Padres	2–6	Cease (5–10)	Bello (8–6)	—	Petco Park	43,323	65–54	L2
120	August 11	@ Astros	6–7	Javier (1–0)	Crochet (13–5)	Sousa (4)	Daikin Park	39,330	65–55	L3
121	August 12	@ Astros	14–1	May (7–8)	Arrighetti (1–3)	—	Daikin Park	34,396	66–55	W1
122	August 13	@ Astros	1–4	Brown (10–5)	Buehler (7–7)	Abreu (1)	Daikin Park	31,048	66–56	L1
123	August 15	Marlins	2–1	Chapman (4–2)	Simpson (2–2)	—	Fenway Park	36,854	67–56	W1
124	August 16	Marlins	7–5	Bello (9–6)	Quantrill (4–10)	Chapman (22)	Fenway Park	36,192	68–56	W2
125	August 17	Marlins	3–5	Phillips (2–1)	Weissert (4–4)	Bender (4)	Fenway Park	35,931	68–57	L1
126	August 18	Orioles	3–6	Rogers (6–2)	May (7–9)	—	Fenway Park	36,961	68–58	L2
127	August 19	Orioles	3–4 (11)	Canó (2–6)	Whitlock (5–3)	Martin (2)	Fenway Park	37,435	68–59	L3
128	August 21	@ Yankees	6–3	Weissert (5–4)	Weaver (3–4)	Chapman (23)	Yankee Stadium	47,036	69–59	W1
129	August 22	@ Yankees	1–0	Bello (10–6)	Leiter Jr. (5–7)	Chapman (24)	Yankee Stadium	46,064	70–59	W2
130	August 23	@ Yankees	12–1	Crochet (14–5)	Warren (7–6)	—	Yankee Stadium	45,512	71–59	W3
131	August 24	@ Yankees	2–7	Rodón (14–7)	May (7–10)	—	Yankee Stadium	44,640	71–60	L1
132	August 25	@ Orioles	4–3	Fitts (2–4)	Sugano (10–6)	Chapman (25)	Camden Yards	15,740	72–60	W1
133	August 26	@ Orioles	5–0	Giolito (9–2)	Bradish (0–1)	—	Camden Yards	14,776	73–60	W2
134	August 27	@ Orioles	3–2	Weissert (6–4)	Akin (4–6)	Chapman (26)	Camden Yards	16,790	74–60	W3
135	August 28	@ Orioles	3–2	Hicks (2–7)	Garcia (0–1)	Matz (2)	Camden Yards	15,374	75–60	W4
136	August 29	Pirates	2–4	Skenes (9–9)	Weissert (6–5)	Santana (11)	Fenway Park	36,344	75–61	L1
137	August 30	Pirates	3–10	Oviedo (2–0)	May (7–11)	—	Fenway Park	36,391	75–62	L2
138	August 31	Pirates	5–2	Giolito (10–2)	Keller (6–13)	Chapman (27)	Fenway Park	36,583	76–62	W1

September: 13–11 (Home: 6–6; Away: 7–5)

#	Date	Opponent	Score	Win	Loss	Save	Stadium	Attendance	Record	Box/ Streak
139	September 1	Guardians	6–4	Bello (11–6)	Sabrowski (0–1)	Chapman (28)	Fenway Park	36,021	77–62	W2
140	September 2	Guardians	11–7	Slaten (2–4)	Gaddis (1–2)	—	Fenway Park	34,902	78–62	W3
141	September 3	Guardians	1–8	Cantillo (4–3)	Bernardino (4–3)	—	Fenway Park	36,658	78–63	L1
142	September 5	@ Diamondbacks	5–10	Rodríguez (7–8)	Tolle (0–1)	—	Chase Field	39,126	78–64	L2
143	September 6	@ Diamondbacks	1–5	Pfaadt (13–8)	Giolito (10–3)	—	Chase Field	35,679	78–65	L3
144	September 7	@ Diamondbacks	7–4	Whitlock (6–3)	Rashi (0–1)	Chapman (29)	Chase Field	31,346	79–65	W1
145	September 8	@ Athletics	7–0	Crochet (15–5)	Morales (3–1)	—	Sutter Health Park	10,079	80–65	W2
146	September 9	@ Athletics	6–0	Early (1–0)	Springs (10–11)	—	Sutter Health Park	10,066	81–65	W3
147	September 10	@ Athletics	4–5	Harris (2–1)	Chapman (4–3)	—	Sutter Health Park	9,634	81–66	L1
148	September 12	Yankees	1–4	Gil (4–1)	Giolito (10–4)	Bednar (23)	Fenway Park	36,760	81–67	L2
149	September 13	Yankees	3–5	Fried (17–5)	Bello (11–7)	Bednar (24)	Fenway Park	36,315	81–68	L3
150	September 14	Yankees	6–4	Crochet (16–5)	Warren (8–7)	Chapman (30)	Fenway Park	35,437	82–68	W1
151	September 16	Athletics	1–2	Spence (3–5)	Weissert (6–6)	Harris (3)	Fenway Park	35,886	82–69	L1
152	September 17	Athletics	5–4 (10)	Murphy (3–0)	Kelly (4–4)	—	Fenway Park	36,404	83–69	W1
153	September 18	Athletics	3–5	Ginn (4–6)	Bello (11–8)	Harris (4)	Fenway Park	32,838	83–70	L1
154	September 19	@ Rays	11–7	Crochet (17–5)	Cleavinger (1–6)	—	George M. Steinbrenner Field	10,046	84–70	W1
155	September 20	@ Rays	6–3	Whitlock (7–3)	Scholtens (0–1)	Chapman (31)	George M. Steinbrenner Field	10,046	85–70	W2
156	September 21	@ Rays	3–7	Cleavinger (2–6)	Early (1–1)	—	George M. Steinbrenner Field	10,046	85–71	L1
157	September 23	@ Blue Jays	4–1	Wilson (4–1)	Gausman (10–11)	Chapman (32)	Rogers Centre	42,927	86–71	W1
158	September 24	@ Blue Jays	7–1	Crochet (18–5)	Scherzer (5–5)	—	Rogers Centre	39,438	87–71	W2
159	September 25	@ Blue Jays	1–6	Rodríguez (3–2)	Bello (11–9)	—	Rogers Centre	42,129	87–72	L1
160	September 26	Tigers	4–3	Chapman (5–3)	Kahnle (1–5)	—	Fenway Park	37,052	88–72	W1
161	September 27	Tigers	1–2	Hurter (4–3)	Early (1–2)	Vest (23)	Fenway Park	36,478	88–73	L1
162	September 28	Tigers	4–3	De León (1–0)	Paddack (5–12)	Weissert (4)	Fenway Park	35,503	89–73	W1

=== Grand slams ===
No.	Date	Red Sox batter	H/A	Pitcher	Opposing team	Ref.
1	May 18	Rafael Devers	H	Spencer Schwellenbach	Atlanta Braves	
2	May 23	Rafael Devers	H	Emmanuel Rivera†	Baltimore Orioles	
3	June 30	Wilyer Abreu	H	Connor Phillips	Cincinnati Reds	
4	July 23	Romy González	A	Jesús Luzardo	Philadelphia Phillies	

† Normally a position player

=== Ejections ===
No.	Date	Red Sox personnel	H/A	Opposing team	Ref.
1	May 20	Walker Buehler	Home	New York Mets	
2	May 20	Alex Cora	Home	New York Mets	
3	June 9	Alex Cora	Home	Tampa Bay Rays	
4	June 22	Jarren Duran	Away	San Francisco Giants	
5	June 22	Alex Cora	Away	San Francisco Giants	
6	June 23	Alex Cora	Away	Los Angeles Angels	
7	August 13	Alex Cora	Away	Houston Astros	

== Postseason ==
=== Game log ===
Boston Red Sox 2025 Postseason Game Log (1–2)
American League Wild Card Series vs. Yankees (1–2)

#/	Date	Opponent	Score	Win	Loss	Save	Stadium	Attendance	Series	Box/ Streak
1	September 30	@ Yankees	3–1	Crochet (1–0)	Weaver (0–1)	Chapman (1)	Yankee Stadium	47,027	1–0	W1
2	October 1	@ Yankees	3–4	Williams (1–0)	Whitlock (0–1)	Bednar (1)	Yankee Stadium	47,993	1–1	L1
3	October 2	@ Yankees	0–4	Schlittler (1–0)	Early (0–1)	—	Yankee Stadium	48,833	1–2	L2

=== American League Wild Card Series at New York Yankees ===
Game 1, September 30

Tuesday, September 30, 2025 6:08 p.m. EDT at Yankee Stadium, The Bronx, New York; Weather: 74 °F (23 °C), clear; TV: ESPN
Team	1	2	3	4	5	6	7	8	9	R	H	E
Boston Red Sox	0	0	0	0	0	0	2	0	1	3	8	0
New York Yankees	0	1	0	0	0	0	0	0	0	1	7	0
WP: Garrett Crochet (1–0, 7 2/3 IP, 1 run, 4 hits, 11 strikeouts) LP: Luke Weaver (0–1, 0/3 IP, 2 runs, 2 hits) Sv: Aroldis Chapman (1); Home runs: BOS: None; NYY: Anthony Volpe (1st); Attendance: 47,027; Notes: Yankees starter Max Fried pitched 6 1/3 innings and gave up 4 hits with 6 strikeouts. Boxscore

Game 2, October 1

Wednesday, October 1, 2025 6:08 p.m. EDT at Yankee Stadium, The Bronx, New York; Weather: 64 °F (18 °C), clear; TV: ESPN
Team	1	2	3	4	5	6	7	8	9	R	H	E
Boston Red Sox	0	0	2	0	0	1	0	0	0	3	6	0
New York Yankees	2	0	0	0	1	0	0	1	–	4	10	1
WP: Devin Williams (1 IP, 1 hit, 1 strikeout) LP: Garrett Whitlock (1 2/3 IP, 1 run, 3 hits, 3 strikeouts) Sv: David Bednar (1st); Home runs: BOS: Trevor Story (1st); NYY: Ben Rice (1st); Attendance: 47,993; Notes: Both starting pitchers had no-decisions; the Yankees' Carlos Rodón pitched 6 innings and gave up 3 runs on 4 hits while striking out 6 hitters; the Red Sox' Brayan Bello lasted only 2 1/3 innings, surrendering 2 runs on 4 hits and recording no strikeouts. Boxscore

Game 3, October 2

Thursday, October 2, 2025 8:08 p.m. EDT at Yankee Stadium, The Bronx, New York; Weather; 57 °F (14 °C), clear; TV: ESPN
Team	1	2	3	4	5	6	7	8	9	R	H	E
Boston Red Sox	0	0	0	0	0	0	0	0	0	0	5	2
New York Yankees	0	0	0	4	0	0	0	0	–	4	8	1
WP: Cam Schlittler (8 IP, 5 hits, 12 strikeouts) LP: Connelly Early (3 2/3 IP, 4 runs, 6 hits, 6 strikeouts); Home runs: BOS: None; NYY: None; Attendance: 48,833; Notes: Nathaniel Lowe was the only Red Sox player to reach second base (in the 5th); no players reached third; the Yankees allowed only one walk, to Alex Bregman in the 9th; both starting pitchers were rookies, with the Yankees' Schlittler having debuted on July 9 and the Red Sox' Early on September 9. Boxscore

With the loss, the Red Sox failed to defeat the Yankees in the playoffs for the first time since 2003 and also failed to reach the ALCS for the fourth consecutive year.

=== Postseason rosters ===
Playoff rosters
American League Wild Card Series

- Pitchers: 22 Garrett Whitlock • 32 Justin Wilson • 35 Garrett Crochet • 38 Kyle Harrison • 41 Steven Matz • 44 Aroldis Chapman • 57 Greg Weissert • 63 Justin Slaten • 66 Brayan Bello • 70 Payton Tolle • 71 Connelly Early • 76 Zack Kelly
- Catchers: 12 Connor Wong • 75 Carlos Narváez
- Infielders: 2 Alex Bregman • 10 Trevor Story • 17 David Hamilton • 37 Nathaniel Lowe
- Outfielders: 7 Masataka Yoshida • 16 Jarren Duran • 30 Rob Refsnyder • 52 Wilyer Abreu
- Infielders/Outfielders: 3 Ceddanne Rafaela • 20 Nick Sogard • 23 Romy González • 40 Nate Eaton

== Roster ==
2025 Boston Red Sox
Roster
Pitchers: 71 Jorge Alcalá; 66 Brayan Bello; 83 Brennan Bernardino; 0 Walker Buehler; 68 Nick Burdi; 48 Isaiah Campbell; 44 Aroldis Chapman; 64 Cooper Criswell; 35 Garrett Crochet; 78 José De León; 73 Hunter Dobbins; 71 Connelly Early; 80 Richard Fitts; 51 Michael Fulmer; 54 Lucas Giolito; 99 Luis Guerrero; 38 Kyle Harrison; 31 Liam Hendriks; 46 Jordan Hicks; 89 Tanner Houck; 76 Zack Kelly; 41 Steven Matz; 85 Dustin May; 47 Jovani Morán; 72 Chris Murphy; 19 Sean Newcomb; 63 Justin Slaten; 78 Robert Stock; 70 Payton Tolle; 57 Greg Weissert; 22 Garrett Whitlock; 32 Justin Wilson; 25 Josh Winckowski	Catchers: 75 Carlos Narváez; 18 Blake Sabol; 18 Ali Sánchez; 12 Connor Wong; Infielders: 2 Alex Bregman; 28 Kristian Campbell; 36 Triston Casas; 23 Romy González; 17 David Hamilton; 37 Nathaniel Lowe; 39 Marcelo Mayer; 20 Nick Sogard; 10 Trevor Story; 29 Abraham Toro	Outfielders: 52 Wilyer Abreu; 48,19 Roman Anthony; 16 Jarren Duran; 40 Nate Eaton; 51 Jhostynxon Garcia; 3 Ceddanne Rafaela; 30 Rob Refsnyder; 7 Masataka Yoshida; Other batters: 11 Rafael Devers	Manager: 13 Alex Cora; Coaches: 53 Andrew Bailey (pitching); 62 Peter Fatse (hitting); 58 José David Flores (first base/infield); 86 Parker Guinn (bullpen catcher/catching instructor); 59 Chris Holt (bullpen); 84 Kyle Hudson (third base/outfield); 88 Dillon Lawson (assistant hitting); 90 Charlie Madden (bullpen catcher); 85 Ben Rosenthal (assistant hitting); 91 Chris Stasio (director ML development); 33 Jason Varitek (game planning/run prevention); 60 Ramón Vázquez (bench)

=== Transactions ===
April transactions

==== April ====
- April 1: The team announced that they signed Garrett Crochet to a six-year extension worth $170 million.
- April 2: The team announced that they signed Kristian Campbell to an eight-year contract extension worth $60 million.
- April 7: The team traded pitcher Quinn Priester to the Milwaukee Brewers in exchange for minor-league outfielder Yophery Rodriguez, a Competitive Balance Round selection in the 2025 MLB draft, and a player to be named later (or cash considerations).
- April 8: The team placed catcher Connor Wong on the 10-day IL, designated pitcher Robert Stock for assignment. The team recalled catcher Blake Sabol and pitcher Josh Winckowski from Worcester.
- April 10: The team agreed to a minor-league deal with catcher Yasmani Grandal. The team also released pitcher Matt Moore from his minor league contract. The team sent pitcher Liam Hendricks on a rehab assignment to Worcester and pitcher Robert Stock outright to Worcester.
- April 13: The team placed pitcher Richard Fitts on the 15-day IL and selected the contract of pitcher Michael Fulmer from Worcester.
- April 15: The team sent pitcher Lucas Giolito on a rehab assignment to Portland.
- April 16: The team sent pitchers Liam Hendriks and Brayan Bello on rehab assignments to Portland, recalled second baseman Nick Sogard from Worcester, signed free agent pitcher Angel Lopez to a minor-league contract, and placed third baseman Alex Bregman on the paternity list.
- April 18: The team optioned Nick Sogard to Worcester recalled Hunter Dobbins from Worcester, activated Alex Bregman from the paternity list, and designated Michael Fulmer for assignment.
- April 19: The team activated pitcher Liam Hendriks from the 15-day injured list and optioned pitcher Hunter Dobbins to Worcester.
- April 20: Pitcher Michael Fulmer elected free agency.
- April 22: The team activated pitcher Brayan Bello from the 15-day injured list and optioned pitcher Zack Kelly to Worcester.
- April 24: The team optioned pitcher Josh Wincowski to Worcester and recalled pitcher Luis Guerrero from Worcester.
- April 25: The team sent pitcher Lucas Giolito on a rehab assignment to Worcester.
- April 26: The team recalled pitcher Cooper Criswell from Worcester.
- April 27: The team sent catcher Connor Wong on a rehab assignment to Worcester and optioned pitcher Cooper Criswell to Worcester.
- April 30: The team placed pitcher Brennan Bernardino on the bereavement list, activated pitcher Lucas Giolito from the 15-day injured list, and signed free agent pitcher Jay Allmer to a minor league contract.

May transactions

==== May ====
- May 2: The team activated catcher Connor Wong from the 10-day injured list and recalled pitcher Hunter Dobbins from Worcester; the team optioned catcher Blake Sabol to Worcester, and placed pitcher Walker Buehler on the 15-day injured list retroactive to April 29, 2025.
- May 3: The team activated pitcher Brennan Bernardino from the bereavement list, selected the contract of third baseman Abraham Toro from Worcester, optioned pitcher Luis Guerrero to Worcester, and placed Triston Casas on the 10-day injured list.
- May 5: The team acquired pitcher John Holobetz from the Brewers as the player to be named later from the April 7 trade of Quinn Priester to the Brewers.
- May 10: The team placed Romy González on the 10-day injured list retroactive to May 8; recalled Nick Sogard from Worcester.
- May 14: The team placed Tanner Houck on the 15-day injured list and recalled Cooper Criswell from Worcester.
- May 15: The team optioned Cooper Criswell to Worcester and transferred Kutter Crawford from the 15-day injured list to the 60-day injured list.
- May 16: The team selected the contract of Nick Burdi.
- May 20: The team activated Walker Buehler from the 15-day injured list and optioned Nick Burdi to Worcester.
- May 22: The Red Sox acquired Ryan Noda from the Angels in exchange for cash considerations and optioned him to Worcester; Masataka Yoshida was transferred to the 60-day injured list. The team also sent Richard Fitts on a rehab assignment to Portland and signed free agent pitcher P. J. Labriola to a minor league contract.
- May 24: The team moved Triston Casas to the 60-day injured list, placed Alex Bregman on the 10-day disabled list, and added Marcelo Mayer to the active roster. Additionally, the team designated Sean Newcomb for assignment and recalled Luis Guerrero from Worcester.
- May 25: The team optioned Cooper Criswell and Luis Guerrero to Worcester; recalled Zack Kelly from Worcester.
- May 27: The team traded Sean Newcomb to the Athletics in exchange for cash considerations. The team also activated Richard Fitts from the 15-day injured list.
- May 30: The team placed Liam Hendriks on the 15-day injured list retroactive to May 28 and recalled Nick Burdi from Worcester.

June transactions

==== June ====
- June 1: The team designated Blake Sabol for assignment, optioned Nick Sogard to Worcester, recalled Luis Guerrero from Worcester, and added Nate Eaton to the active roster. The team also placed Justin Slaten on the 15-day injured list retroactive to May 29.
- June 4: Yasmani Grandal informed Worcester that he was stepping away from his minor league deal.
- June 5: The team sent Blake Sabol outright to Worcester.
- June 7: The team selected the contract of Robert Stock from Worcester, and Josh Winckowski was placed on the 60-day injured list.
- June 9: The team selected the contracts of Roman Anthony and Brian Van Belle from Worcester, and designated Robert Stock and Ryan Noda for assignment. The team also placed Wilyer Abreu on the 15-day injured list.
- June 10: The team designated Brian Van Belle for assignment.
- June 11: The team acquired pitcher Jorge Alcala from the Minnesota Twins in exchange for minor-league infielder Andy Lugo. The team also sent pitcher Robert Stock outright to Worcester.
- June 12: The team signed free agent pitcher Michael Manjarres to a minor-league contract.
- June 13: The team sent Nick Burdi on a rehab assignment to Worcester, whilst the White Sox claimed Ryan Noda off of waivers from the team.
- June 14: The team traded Brian Van Belle to the Reds in exchange for cash considerations.
- June 15: The team traded Rafael Devers to the San Francisco Giants in exchange for pitchers Kyle Harrison and Jordan Hicks and minor-league players James Tibbs III and Jose Bello. The team designated Zach Penrod for assignment.
- June 17: The team sent Wilyer Abreu on a rehab assignment to Worcester.
- June 18: The team sent Tanner Houck on a rehab assignment to Worcester.
- June 20: The team traded Zach Penrod to the Dodgers in exchange for cash considerations, optioned Kristian Campbell to Worcester and reinstated Wilyer Abreu from the 10-day injured list.
- June 21: The team signed free agent Wascar Berroa to a minor-league contract.
- June 22: The team sent Jordan Hicks on a rehab assignment to Worcester. The team sent Hunter Dobbins on the 15-day injured list retroactive to June 21 and recalled Richard Fitts from Worcester.
- June 27: The team placed Marcelo Mayer on the bereavement list and recalled Nick Sogard from Worcester.
- June 28: The team reinstated Chris Murphy from the 60-day injured list, placed Luis Guerrero on the 15-day injured list, and moved Justin Slaten from the 15-day injured list to the 60-day injured list.
- June 30: The team activated Jordan Hicks from the 15-day injured list and Marcelo Mayer from the bereavement list; the team optioned Nick Sogard to Worcester.

July transactions

==== July ====
- July 1: The team sent Masataka Yoshida on a rehab assignment to Worcester.
- July 2: The team signed Rony Claderon to a minor league contract and recalled Cooper Criswell from Worcester.
- July 3: The team optioned Cooper Criswell to Worcester.
- July 4: The team sent Tanner Houck and Masataka Yoshida on rehab assignments to Portland.
- July 5: The team sent Hunter Dobbins on a rehab assignment to Worcester and signed free agent Alexander Heredia to a minor league contract.
- July 8: The team transferred Liam Hendriks from the 15-day injured list to the 60-day injured list and optioned Richard Fitts to Worcester. The team selected the contract of Isaiah Campbell from Worcester.
- July 9: The team placed Nick Burdi on the 60-day injured list. The team also activated Masataka Yoshida from the 60-day injured list, while optioning Nate Eaton and sending Tanner Houck on a rehab assignment, both to Worcester.
- July 11: The team optioned both David Hamilton and Isaiah Campbell to Worcester, and activated Alex Bregman and Hunter Dobbins from the 10-day and 15-day injured lists, respectively.
- July 12: The team traded Blake Sabol from Worcester to the Chicago White Sox in exchange for cash considerations. The team also placed Hunter Dobbins on the 15-day injured list with a right ACL tear and recalled Richard Fitts from Worcester.
- July 18: The team signed free agent Ronaldo Hernández to a minor league contract.
- July 20: The team signed free agent Andrews Opata to a minor league contract. The team also signed 2025 MLB draft selections Kyson Witherspoon, Marcus Phillips, Anthony Eyanson, Christian Foutch, Leighton Finley, Jacob Mayers, Maximus Martin, Barrett Morgan, Ethan Walker, Jack Winnay, Carter Rasmussen, Skylar King, Jason Gilman, Patrick Galle, Cade Fisher, and Fabian Bonilla to the organization.
- July 22: The team signed 2025 MLB draft selections Henry Godbout, Mason White, Myles Patton, and Dylan Brown to the organization.
- July 24: The team signed Ty Hodge and free agent Caleb Berry, Berry to a minor league contract. The team also sent Zack Kelly on a rehab assignment to Greenville Drive.
- July 25: The team placed Marcelo Mayer on the 10-day injured list, retroactive to July 24, with a right wrist sprain. Correspondingly, the team recalled David Hamilton from Worcester.
- July 29: The team optioned Richard Fitts to Worcester and recalled Cooper Criswell from Worcester.
- July 31: The team traded minor-league infielder Blaze Jordan to the St. Louis Cardinals in exchange for pitcher Steven Matz. The team also traded minor-league players James Tibbs III and Zach Ehrhard to the Los Angeles Dodgers in exchange for pitcher Dustin May.

August transactions

==== August ====
- August 1: The team activated Steven Matz, optioned Brennan Bernardino to Worcester and sent Nick Burdi on rehab assignment to Worcester.
- August 2: The team transferred Luis Guerrero from the 15-day injured list to the 60-day injured list with a right elbow strain. The team also optioned both Cooper Criswell and Zack Kelly to Worcester, and activated Dustin May.
- August 5: The team designated Jorge Alcalá for assignment and recalled Isaiah Campbell from Worcester.
- August 6: The team signed Roman Anthony to an eight-year contract extension covering the 2026–2033 seasons with a club option for 2034 worth $130 million.
- August 8: The team claimed Ali Sánchez off waivers from the Toronto Blue Jays.
- August 11: The team designated Nick Burdi for assignment, and optioned both Chris Murphy and David Hamilton to Worcester. The team also activated Ali Sánchez and recalled Jovani Morán from Worcester.
- August 13: The team sent Nick Burdi outright to Worcester.
- August 18: The team signed first baseman Nathaniel Lowe to a one-year contract for 2025, wearing number 37. The team also placed outfielder Rob Refsnyder on the 10-day injured list (retroactive to August 15) with a left oblique strain, recalled infielder/outfielder Nate Eaton from Worcester, and designated catcher Ali Sánchez for assignment.
- August 19: The team optioned Jovani Morán and sent Justin Slaten to Worcester, the latter on rehab assignment. The team also recalled Brennan Bernardino from Worcester.
- August 20: The team optioned Isaiah Campbell to Worcester.
- August 21: The team recalled both David Hamilton and Richard Fitts from Worcester, and designated Abraham Toro for assignment. The team also placed Wilyer Abreu on the 10-day injured list (retroactive to August 18) with a right calf strain, and selected outfielder Jhostynxon Garcia to fill his place on the roster, wearing number 51.
- August 23: The team sent Abraham Toro outright to Worcester.
- August 26: The team placed Richard Fitts on the 15-day injured list with right arm neuritis and recalled Jovani Morán from Worcester.
- August 28: The team activated Justin Slaten and Rob Refsnyder. The team also placed Nathaniel Lowe on the paternity list and optioned Jovani Morán to Worcester.
- August 29: The team optioned Jhostynxon Garcia to Worcester and recalled Nick Sogard from Worcester. The team also released Walker Buehler and selected Payton Tolle from Worcester, wearing number 70.
- August 30: The team reinstated Nathaniel Lowe from the paternity list and optioned Nick Sogard to Worcester.
- August 31: The team received Ali Sánchez in a trade from the New York Mets.

September transactions

==== September ====
- September 1: The team transferred Marcelo Mayer from the 10-day injured list to the 60-day injured list, recalled Zack Kelly from Worcester, and selected the contract of Ali Sánchez from Worcester.
- September 2: The team sent Luis Guerrero on rehab assignment to Portland.
- September 3: The team placed Roman Anthony on the 10-day injured list with a left oblique strain, and recalled Nick Sogard from Worcester.
- September 5: The team placed Jordan Hicks on the 15-day injured list, retroactive to September 4, with right shoulder tendinitis and recalled Chris Murphy from Worcester.
- September 9: The team selected Connelly Early from Worcester, sent Luis Guerrero to Worcester on rehab assignment, recalled Vaughn Grissom from Worcester, and placed both Grissom and Dustin May on the injured list; Grissom on the 60-day with plantar fasciitis, and May on the 15-day (retroactive to September 6) with right elbow neuritis.
- September 10: The team recalled Kyle Harrison from Worcester, and optioned Chris Murphy to Worcester.
- September 12: The team placed Brennan Bernardino on the 15-day injured list, retroactive to September 10, with a left latissimus dorsi strain, and recalled Chris Murphy from Worcester.
- September 13: The team signed free agent John Brebbia to a minor league contract.
- September 21: The team activated Wilyer Abreu from the 10-day injured list and designated Ali Sánchez for assignment.
- September 23: The team sent Ali Sánchez outright to Worcester.
- September 28: The team optioned Chris Murphy to Worcester and selected the contract of José De León from Worcester.

=== MLB debuts ===
- March 27: Kristian Campbell
- April 6: Hunter Dobbins
- May 24: Marcelo Mayer
- June 9: Roman Anthony
- August 22: Jhostynxon Garcia
- August 29: Payton Tolle
- September 9: Connelly Early

== Season statistics ==
Red Sox batting team leaders
Batting
Batting average†	Trevor Story	.263
Hits	Trevor Story	161
Runs scored	Trevor Story	91
Home runs	Trevor Story	25
RBIs	Trevor Story	96
Triples	Jarren Duran	13
Stolen bases	Trevor Story	31
Games played	Jarren Duran; Trevor Story	157

Red Sox pitching team leaders
Pitching
ERA‡	Garrett Crochet	2.59
WHIP‡	Garrett Crochet	1.03
Strikeouts	Garrett Crochet	255
Innings pitched	Garrett Crochet	205 1/3
Games started	Garrett Crochet	32
Wins	Garrett Crochet	18
Saves	Aroldis Chapman	32
Games pitched	Greg Weissert	72

Updated through September 28, 2025
† Minimum 3.1 plate appearances per team games played
AVG qualified batters: Duran, Rafaela, Story
‡ Minimum 1 inning pitched per team games played
ERA & WHIP qualified pitchers: Bello, Crochet

=== Batting ===
Key to statistic abbreviations

- G — Games played
- AB — At bats
- R — Runs
- H — Hits
- 2B — Doubles
- 3B — Triples
- HR — Home runs
- RBI — Runs batted in
- BB — Walks
- SO — Strikeouts
- SB — Stolen bases
- AVG — Batting average †
- OBP — On-base percentage
- SLG — Slugging percentage
- OPS — On-base plus slugging

Statistics in bold are team leaders
† Minimum 3.1 plate appearances per team games played
* Traded midseason to the Red Sox

§ = Indicates league leader

2025 Batting statistics
Player	G	AB	R	H	2B	3B	HR	RBI	BB	SO	SB	AVG	OBP	SLG	OPS
Jarren Duran	**157**	**620**	86	159	**41**	**13**§	16	84	**60**	169	24	.256	**.332**	**.442**	**.774**
Trevor Story	**157**	612	**91**	**161**	29	0	**25**	**96**	33	**176**	**31**	**.263**	.308	.433	.741
Ceddanne Rafaela	156	546	84	136	34	4	16	63	28	117	20	.249	.290	.406	.696
Carlos Narváez	118	403	51	97	27	0	15	50	38	111	1	.241	.306	.419	.726
Alex Bregman	114	433	64	118	28	0	18	62	51	70	1	.273	.360	.462	.821
Wilyer Abreu	115	373	53	92	17	0	22	69	40	101	6	.247	.317	.469	.786
Romy González	96	315	47	96	23	3	9	53	18	81	6	.305	.343	.483	.826
David Hamilton	91	177	27	35	4	1	6	19	13	47	22	.198	.257	.333	.590
Abraham Toro	77	259	33	62	13	0	7	27	14	42	2	.239	.289	.371	.659
Roman Anthony	71	257	48	75	18	1	8	32	40	84	4	.292	.396	.463	.859
Rob Refsnyder	70	182	29	49	12	0	9	30	24	54	3	.269	.354	.484	.838
Kristian Campbell	67	229	24	51	10	0	6	21	29	72	2	.223	.319	.345	.664
Connor Wong	63	168	16	32	8	0	0	7	16	42	2	.190	.262	.238	.500
Masataka Yoshida	55	188	16	50	11	0	4	26	10	24	3	.266	.307	.388	.696
Marcelo Mayer	44	127	20	29	8	1	4	10	8	41	0	.228	.272	.402	.674
Nate Eaton	41	81	16	24	4	0	1	4	6	19	9	.296	.348	.383	.731
Nathaniel Lowe*	34	100	14	28	6	1	2	16	15	29	0	.280	.370	.420	.790
Triston Casas	29	99	5	18	3	0	3	11	11	27	0	.182	.277	.303	.580
Nick Sogard	30	96	13	25	8	0	0	9	5	24	2	.260	.317	.344	.661
Jhostynxon Garcia	5	7	0	1	1	0	0	0	2	5	0	.143	.333	.286	.619
Ali Sánchez*	4	2	0	0	0	0	0	0	0	1	0	.000	.000	.000	.000
**Totals**	**162**	**5562**	**786**	**1414**	**324**	**24**	**186**	**748**	**518**	**1419**	**139**	**.254**	**.324**	**.421**	**.745**

Updated through September 28, 2025

=== Pitching ===
Key to statistic abbreviations

- GP — Games pitched
- GS — Games started
- W — Wins
- L — Losses
- SV — Saves
- HLD — Holds
- IP — Innings pitched
- H — Hits allowed
- ER — Earned Runs allowed
- HR — Home runs allowed
- BB — Walks allowed
- K — Strikeouts
- ERA — ERA †
- WHIP — WHIP

Statistics in bold are team leaders
† Minimum 1 inning pitched per team games played
* Traded midseason to the Red Sox
# Traded midseason away from the Red Sox
‡ Normally a position player

§ = Indicates league leader

2025 Batting statistics
Pitcher	GP	GS	W	L	SV	HLD	IP	H	ER	HR	BB	K	ERA	WHIP
Garrett Crochet	32	**32**	**18**	5	0	0	**205.1**§	**165**	59	**24**	46	**255**§	**2.59**	**1.03**
Brayan Bello	28	27	11	**9**	0	0	166.2	147	62	16	**59**	124	3.35	1.24
Lucas Giolito	26	26	10	4	0	0	145.0	131	55	17	56	121	3.41	1.29
Walker Buehler#	23	22	7	7	0	0	112.1	120	**68**	22	55	84	5.45	1.56
Garrett Whitlock	62	0	7	3	1	**24**	72.0	54	18	2	24	91	2.18	1.08
Greg Weissert	**72**	0	6	6	4	17	67.0	57	21	6	21	57	2.82	1.16
Hunter Dobbins	13	11	4	1	0	0	61.0	61	28	6	17	45	4.13	1.28
Aroldis Chapman	67	0	5	3	**32**	4	61.1	28	8	3	15	85	1.17	0.70
Brennan Bernardino	55	3	4	3	1	2	51.2	39	18	1	26	43	3.14	1.26
Justin Wilson	61	0	4	1	0	19	48.1	48	18	3	20	57	3.35	1.41
Richard Fitts	11	10	2	4	0	0	45.0	43	25	11	16	40	5.00	1.31
Tanner Houck	9	9	0	3	0	0	43.2	57	39	10	17	32	8.04	1.70
Sean Newcomb#	12	5	0	4	0	0	41.0	55	18	3	17	41	3.95	1.76
Zack Kelly	28	0	1	3	0	3	35.1	35	18	3	12	35	4.58	1.33
Justin Slaten	36	0	2	4	3	7	34.0	27	16	3	10	25	4.24	1.09
Chris Murphy	23	0	3	0	0	2	34.2	21	12	4	20	30	3.12	1.18
Dustin May*	6	5	1	4	0	0	28.1	35	17	5	13	26	5.40	1.69
Steven Matz*	21	0	0	0	1	6	21.2	17	5	4	2	12	2.08	0.88
Jordan Hicks*	21	0	1	2	2	1	18.2	25	17	3	12	15	8.20	1.98
Cooper Criswell	7	1	1	0	1	0	17.2	23	7	3	5	9	3.57	1.59
Luis Guerrero	13	0	0	1	0	0	17.1	9	8	0	14	10	4.15	1.33
Jorge Alcala#	19	0	0	0	0	1	16.1	19	6	4	8	18	3.31	1.65
Payton Tolle	7	3	0	1	0	0	16.1	18	11	5	8	19	6.06	1.59
Connelly Early	4	4	1	2	0	0	19.1	17	5	0	4	29	2.33	1.09
Liam Hendriks	14	0	0	2	0	0	13.2	12	10	2	7	12	6.59	1.39
Josh Winckowski	6	0	0	1	0	0	11.2	11	5	0	5	9	3.86	1.37
Kyle Harrison	3	2	0	0	0	0	12.0	14	4	0	5	13	3.00	1.58
Isaiah Campbell	6	0	0	0	0	0	7.2	13	6	1	1	3	7.04	1.83
Nick Burdi	4	0	0	0	0	0	5.1	5	0	0	2	5	0.00	1.31
Jovani Morán	2	0	0	0	0	0	4.0	5	3	0	3	5	6.75	2.00
Michael Fulmer#	1	0	0	0	0	0	2.2	4	3	1	2	2	10.13	2.25
Robert Stock	2	0	0	0	0	0	2.2	4	3	1	4	1	10.13	3.00
Abraham Toro‡	1	0	0	0	0	0	1.0	4	2	0	1	0	18.00	5.00
Nate Eaton‡	1	0	0	0	0	0	1.0	2	0	0	0	0	0.00	2.00
**Totals**	**162**	**162**	**89**	**73**	**45**	**86**	**1448.1**	**1333**	**598**	**164**	**530**	**1361**	**3.72**	**1.29**

Updated through September 28, 2025

== Awards and honors ==
Recipient	Award	Date awarded	Ref.
Alex Bregman	AL Player of the Week	April 7, 2025	
Kristian Campbell	AL Rookie of the Month	May 2, 2025	
Rafael Devers	AL Player of the Week	May 12, 2025	
Ceddanne Rafaela	MLB Play of the Week	May 12, 2025	
Alex Bregman	All-Star Reserve	July 6, 2025	
Aroldis Chapman	All-Star Reserve	July 6, 2025	
Garrett Crochet	All-Star Reserve	July 6, 2025	
Trevor Story	AL Player of the Week	August 4, 2025	
Roman Anthony	AL Rookie of the Month	September 3, 2025	
Aroldis Chapman	AL Reliever of the Month	September 3, 2025	
Ceddanne Rafaela	MLB Play of the Week	September 8, 2025	
Ceddanne Rafaela	Fielding Bible Award (CF)	October 23, 2025	
Wilyer Abreu	AL Gold Glove Award (OF)	November 2, 2025	
Ceddanne Rafaela	AL Gold Glove Award (OF)	November 2, 2025	
Aroldis Chapman	AL Reliever of the Year	November 13, 2025	
Garrett Crochet	All-MLB Team	November 13, 2025	
Aroldis Chapman	All-MLB Team	November 13, 2025	

Garrett Crochet and Aroldis Chapman finished 8th and 18th respectively in the American League MVP voting. Crochet also finished 2nd in the AL Cy Young Award vote, while Chapman placed 7th. Further, Roman Anthony finished 3rd in the AL Rookie of the Year Award voting.

== Farm system ==
Minor-league coaching assignments were announced on January 16.

Level	Team	League	Division	Manager	Record (Note: Overall records for the entire season are presented—some minor leagues play a split season, with first-half and second-half results determining playoff participants.)
Triple-A	Worcester Red Sox	International League	East	Chad Tracy	76–73 (.510)
Double-A	Portland Sea Dogs	Eastern League	Northeast	Chad Epperson	64–71 (.474)
High-A	Greenville Drive	South Atlantic League	South	Liam Carroll	66–66 (.500)
Single-A	Salem Red Sox	Carolina League	North	Ozzie Chavez	56–74 (.431)
Rookie	FCL Red Sox	Florida Complex League	South	Chase Illig	25–34 (.424)
Rookie	DSL Red Sox Blue	Dominican; Summer League	North	Sandy Madera	32–22 (.593)
Rookie	DSL Red Sox Red	Dominican; Summer League	Northwest	Amaury Garcia	25–30 (.455)

== Amateur draft ==
The 2025 MLB draft was held on July 13–14, 2025, in Cumberland, Georgia, site of the season's All-Star Game. With their 21 picks, the Red Sox selected 15 pitchers; the team only selected one high school player, in the 19th round, as all their other selections were college baseball players.

The Red Sox acquired a Competitive Balance Round A pick (between the first and second rounds) as part of the April 7 trade that sent pitcher Quinn Priester to the Brewers. The Red Sox received a Compensatory round pick (between the second and third rounds) due to the San Diego Padres signing Nick Pivetta. The Red Sox did not have a pick in the second round, due to Alex Bregman signing with the team in February.

Round	Pick	Name	Position†	School (state)	Birthplace	Signing date	Ref.
1	15	Kyson Witherspoon	RHP	Oklahoma (OK)	USA	July 20	
Comp. Bal. A	33	Marcus Phillips	RHP	Tennessee (TN)	USA	July 20	
Comp.	75	Henry Godbout	SS	Virginia (VA)	USA	July 22	
3	87	Anthony Eyanson	RHP	LSU (LA)	USA	July 20	
4	118	Mason White	SS	Arizona (AZ)	USA	July 22	
5	148	Christian Foutch	RHP	Arkansas (AR)	USA	July 20	
6	178	Leighton Finley	RHP	Georgia (GA)	USA	July 20	
7	208	Myles Patton	LHP	Texas A&M (TX)	USA	July 22	
8	238	Dylan Brown	LHP	Old Dominion (VA)	USA	July 22	
9	268	Jacob Mayers	RHP	Louisiana State (LA)	USA	July 20	
10	298	Maximus Martin	SS	Kansas State (KS)	USA	July 20	
11	328	Barrett Morgan	RHP	Cowley College (KS)	USA	July 20	
12	358	Ethan Walker	LHP	Kentucky (KY)	USA	July 20	
13	388	Jack Winnay	3B	Wake Forest (NC)	USA	July 20	
14	418	Carter Rasmussen	RHP	Wofford (SC)	USA	July 20	
15	448	Skylar King	OF	West Virginia (WV)	USA	July 20	
16	478	Jason Gilman	LHP	Kean (NJ)	USA	July 20	
17	508	Patrick Galle	RHP	Ole Miss (MS)	USA	July 20	
18	538	Cade Fisher	LHP	Auburn (AL)	USA	July 20	
19	568	Fabian Bonilla	OF	Christian Military Academy (PR)	PR	July 20	
20	598	Garrison Sumner	RHP	BYU (UT)	USA		

† Positions are per MLB Draft Tracker.
