= 2026 Boston Red Sox season =

2026 Boston Red Sox
- American League Wild Card
- League: American League
- Division: East
- Ballpark: Fenway Park
- City: Boston, Massachusetts
- Record: 87–75 (.537)
- Divisional place: 3rd
- Owners: John W. Henry (Fenway Sports Group)
- President: Sam Kennedy
- Chief baseball officer: Craig Breslow
- Manager: Alex Cora (until April 25); Chad Tracy (interim April 25–September 22; permanent from September 22)
- Television: NESN: Dave O’Brien, Mike Monaco, Lou Merloni, Will Middlebrooks, Kevin Millar, Jahmai Webster, Tom Caron, Adam Pellerin, Alanna Rizzo, Matt Barnes, Manny Delcarmen, Lenny DiNardo, Rich Hill, Jonathan Papelbon, J. P. Ricciardi, Jim Rice
- Radio: WEEI-FM / Boston Red Sox Radio Network: Will Flemming, Sean McDonough, Mike Monaco, Cooper Boardman, or Joe Castiglione (play-by-play); Will Middlebrooks or Lenny DiNardo (analysts)

The 2026 Boston Red Sox season was the 126th season in Boston Red Sox franchise history, and their 115th season at Fenway Park. The team opened the regular season in an away game against the Cincinnati Reds on March 26 and concluded the regular season with a home game (played in Florida due to inclement weather in Boston) against the Chicago Cubs on September 27.

After a 10–17 (.370) start, including a sweep at home against their rival New York Yankees, the Red Sox fired manager Alex Cora on April 25. (Note: Bench coach Ramón Vázquez, hitting coach Peter Fatse, assistant hitting coach Dillon Lawson, and third base coach Kyle Hudson were also fired, while game planning coach Jason Varitek was reportedly reassigned to a non-uniformed role. No new role was announced for Varitek and at the end of the season Red Sox leadership stated that Varitek was no longer part of the organization.) Triple-A Worcester Red Sox manager Chad Tracy was subsequently named as the team's interim manager by chief baseball officer Craig Breslow. Tracy was officially named as the team's permanent manager on September 22.

On July 22, the team won its 15th game in a row to tie the franchise record for consecutive games won, established 80 years earlier by the 1946 Red Sox. At the end of the month, the Red Sox' 21–4 (.840) record set a new record for their highest monthly winning percentage in franchise history. (Note: The previous franchise record for a month was a .800 winning percentage, set in June 1901 (20–5) and matched in August 1950 (24–6).)

Facing the Kansas City Royals on September 13, starting pitcher Payton Tolle became the first Red Sox pitcher to record an immaculate inning since Chris Sale accomplished the feat in 2021, and the first to do so in the first inning of the game since Pedro Martínez in 2002.

The Red Sox clinched their second consecutive playoff berth on September 20, when the Atlanta Braves defeated the Houston Astros. The Red Sox became the fourth team in major-league history to clinch a playoff spot after being 14 or more games below .500 during the season. (Note: The other three teams were the 1914 Boston Braves, 1974 Pittsburgh Pirates, and 2005 Houston Astros.) They were swept by their division rival New York Yankees in the American League Wild Card Series in two games.

== Offseason ==
At the conclusion of the 2025 season, the Red Sox had 11 players under contract for the 2026 season: Roman Anthony, Brayan Bello, Kristian Campbell, Aroldis Chapman, Garrett Crochet, Jarren Duran, Jordan Hicks, Ceddanne Rafaela, Patrick Sandoval, Garrett Whitlock, and Masataka Yoshida. Four players had contract options and/or opt-outs, four players were eligible to become free agents, nine players were eligible for arbitration, and an additional 22 players were not yet eligible for arbitration due to their limited service time in MLB, and could therefore be retained by the team for the league-minimum salary or released.

October–December 2025

October–December 2025 Roster moves
Date	Roster move	Ref.
October 3	The team recalled Chris Murphy from Worcester, and activated Roman Anthony, Brennan Bernardino, Isaiah Campbell, Kristian Campbell, Cooper Criswell, José De León, Richard Fitts, Jhostynxon García, Lucas Giolito, Jordan Hicks, Dustin May, Jovani Morán, and Luis Perales from Worcester, the 10-day injured list, or the 15-day injured list.	
October 10	The team signed free agents Sebastian Rondon, Steven Garcia, Hicter Ruiz, and Cristopher Silvestre to minor league contracts.	
October 13	The team dismissed Ben Rosenthal as assistant hitting coach.	
October 16	The team sent Isaiah Campbell and José De León outright to Worcester.	
October 23	The team hired John Soteropulos as assistant hitting coach.	
October 27	The team signed free agent Jason Delay to a minor league contract.	
November 2	Outfielder Rob Refsnyder and pitchers Steven Matz, Dustin May, and Justin Wilson elected free agency.	
November 3	Third baseman Alex Bregman opted out of his contract and pitcher Lucas Giolito's mutual option was declined, resulting in both players becoming free agents.	
November 4	The team re-signed outfielder Jarren Duran to a one-year, $7.7m contract for 2026 after declining the option on his prior contract. Shortstop Trevor Story opted in to the remaining two years of his contract to remain with the team, and the team declined their mutual option for pitcher Liam Hendriks, making him a free agent.	
November 6	The team activated Triston Casas, Kutter Crawford, Hunter Dobbins, Vaughn Grissom, Tanner Houck, Marcelo Mayer, Patrick Sandoval, and Josh Winckowski from the 60-day injured list, and to clear room on the 40-man roster, the team designated Luis Guerrero for assignment. The team re-signed pitcher Cooper Criswell to a one-year major league contract for 2026.	
November 18	The team designated Josh Winckowski and Nathaniel Lowe for assignment, selected Shane Drohan, David Sandlin, and Tyler Uberstine to the Red Sox roster from Worcester, and completed a series of trades: Luis Guerrero was traded to the Tampa Bay Rays for infielder Tristan Gray, Brennan Bernardino was traded to the Colorado Rockies for minor league outfielder Braiden Ward, Chris Murphy was traded to the Chicago White Sox for minor league catcher Ronny Hernandez, and minor league pitcher Alex Hoppe was traded to the Seattle Mariners for minor league catcher Luke Heyman.	
November 20	The team re-signed catcher Connor Wong to a one-year, $1.3m contract for 2026 to avoid arbitration.	
November 21	The team tendered contracts to all 26 remaining unsigned players on the major league roster, excluding Nathaniel Lowe and Josh Winckowski, who became free agents.	
November 25	The team traded pitchers Brandon Clarke and Richard Fitts to the St. Louis Cardinals in exchange for Sonny Gray and cash.	
December 4	The team designated pitcher Cooper Criswell for assignment, and traded minor league prospects Jhostynxon García and Jesus Travieso to the Pittsburgh Pirates in exchange for Johan Oviedo, Tyler Samaniego and Adonys Guzman.	
December 9	The team traded Vaughn Grissom to the Los Angeles Angels in exchange for outfield prospect Isaiah Jackson.	
December 10	The team traded minor league prospect Justin Riemer to the Athletics for minor league pitcher Ryan Watson. Watson was originally a Rule V selection from the Giants.	
December 15	The team traded minor league pitcher Luis Perales to the Washington Nationals for minor league pitcher Jake Bennett.	
December 21	The team traded pitcher Hunter Dobbins and minor league pitching prospects Yhoiker Fajardo and Blake Aita to the St. Louis Cardinals for first baseman Willson Contreras.	
December 30	Infielders Marcelo Mayer and Nate Eaton changed their player numbers to 11 and 18, respectively.	

January–March 2026

January–March 2026 Roster moves
Date	Roster move	Ref.
January 6	The team signed free agent pitcher T.J. Sikkema to a minor league contract and invited him to spring training, and further announced Osvaldo Berrios, Vinny Capra, Jason Delay, Alec Gamboa, Hobie Harris, and Devin Sweet as non-roster invitees to spring training. Boston also avoided arbitration with Kutter Crawford, signing him to a one year contract for $2.75 million.	
January 9	The team reached one-year agreements with their four remaining arbitration-eligible players (Triston Casas, Romy González, Tanner Houck, and Johan Oviedo), avoiding arbitration.	
January 21	The team signed pitcher Ranger Suárez to five-year, $150 million contract, and further announced that they traded infielder Tristan Gray to the Minnesota Twins for minor league catcher Nate Baez.	
January 23	The team announced Nate Baez, Allan Castro, Max Ferguson, Tayron Guerrero, Nathan Hickey, Seth Martinez, Tyler McDonough, Wyatt Olds, Ronald Rosario, Mikey Romero, Noah Song, Braiden Ward, Jacob Webb, and Jeremy Wu-Yelland as non-roster invitees to Spring Training.	
January 31	The team signed free agent catcher Matt Thaiss to a minor league contract with an invite to spring training. Thaiss previously made 60 major league appearances with the Chicago White Sox and Tampa Bay Rays in 2025.	
February 1	The team traded pitcher Jordan Hicks and pitching prospect David Sandlin to the Chicago White Sox, as well as two players to be named later, in exchange for minor league pitcher Gage Ziehl and a player to be named later. The trade included the Red Sox providing Chicago with $8 million in cash, and in turn the White Sox agreed to cover the remaining $16 million of Hicks' $24 million contract.	
February 2	The team signed free agent pitcher Vinny Nittoli to a minor league contract with an invite to spring training.	
February 3	The team signed free agent pitcher Kyle Keller to a minor league contract with an invite to spring training. Keller spent the 2025 season playing in Nippon Professional Baseball (NPB) for the Yomiuri Giants.	
February 4	The team claimed utility player Mickey Gasper off waivers from the Washington Nationals, having previously appeared in 13 games for the Red Sox in 2024. The team also signed free agent infielder Isiah Kiner-Falefa to a one-year contract. Kiner-Falefa previously made 138 major league appearances with the Pittsburgh Pirates and Toronto Blue Jays in 2025.	
February 6	The team claimed infielder Tsung-Che Cheng off waivers from the Washington Nationals.	
February 9	The team traded pitchers Kyle Harrison and Shane Drohan, and infielder David Hamilton, to the Milwaukee Brewers in exchange for infielders Caleb Durbin, Andruw Monasterio, and Anthony Seigler, and a Compensatory round draft pick (Round B).	
February 10	The team signed infielder Brendan Rodgers to a minor league contract with an invite to spring training.	
March 9	The team optioned pitcher Jake Bennett, and reassigned pitchers Osvaldo Berrios, Hobie Harris, Vinny Nittoli, Devin Sweet, and Jeremy Wu-Yelland, as well as catchers Nate Baez and Ronald Rosario, all to Minor League camp.	
March 12	The team signed free agent pitcher Danny Coulombe to a one-year major league contract, and placed utility player Romy González on the 60-day injured list following a successful debridement surgery on his left shoulder.	
March 13	The team reassigned pitcher Jacob Webb to minor league camp.	
March 17	The team reassigned pitchers T.J. Sikkema, Seth Martinez, Wyatt Olds, and Noah Song to minor league camp.	
March 19	The team signed Tommy Kahnle to a minor league contract with an invitation to spring training, and reassigned players Max Ferguson, Tyler McDonough, Mikey Romero, Allan Castro, and Nathan Hickey to minor league camp. The team also optioned Tsung-Che Cheng and Nick Sogard to minor league camp.	

== Spring training ==
Spring Training non-roster invitees

Player	Position	2025 team(s)	Source
Osvaldo Berrios	Pitcher	Memphis Redbirds (AAA) / Springfield Cardinals (AA)	
Alec Gamboa	Pitcher	Lotte Giants (KBO)	
Tayron Guerrero	Pitcher	Chiba Lotte Marines (NPB)	
Hobie Harris	Pitcher	Worcester Red Sox (AAA) / FCL Red Sox (Rookie)	
Kyle Keller	Pitcher	Yomiuri Giants (NPB)	
Seth Martinez	Pitcher	Miami Marlins / Jacksonville Jumbo Shrimp (AAA)	
Vinny Nittoli	Pitcher	Nashville Sounds (AAA) / Norfolk Tides (AAA)	
Wyatt Olds	Pitcher	Worcester Red Sox (AAA) / Portland Sea Dogs (AA)	
T.J. Sikkema	Pitcher	Louisville Bats (AAA) / Chattanooga Lookouts (AA)	
Noah Song	Pitcher	Worcester Red Sox (AAA) / Portland Sea Dogs (AA) / Greenville Drive (High A) / Salem Red Sox (A) / FCL Red Sox (Rookie)	
Devin Sweet	Pitcher	Lehigh Valley IronPigs (AAA)	
Jacob Webb	Pitcher	Worcester Red Sox (AAA) / Portland Sea Dogs (AA) / Greenville Drive (High A)	
Jeremy Wu-Yelland	Pitcher	Portland Sea Dogs (AA) / Greenville Drive (High A)	
Nate Baez	Catcher	Wichita Wind Surge (AA) / Cedar Rapids Kernels (High A)	
Jason Delay	Catcher	Gwinnett Stripers (AAA) / Columbus Clingstones (AA)	
Ronald Rosario	Catcher	Portland Sea Dogs (AA)	
Matt Thaiss	Catcher	Tampa Bay Rays / Chicago White Sox	
Nathan Hickey	Catcher / Infielder	Worcester Red Sox (AAA)	
Vinny Capra	Infielder	Milwaukee Brewers / Chicago White Sox / Charlotte Knights (AAA)	
Brendan Rodgers	Infielder	Houston Astros	
Mikey Romero	Infielder	Worcester Red Sox (AAA) / Portland Sea Dogs (AA)	
Max Ferguson	Infielder / Outfielder	Worcester Red Sox (AAA) / Portland Sea Dogs (AA)	
Tyler McDonough	Infielder / Outfielder	Worcester Red Sox (AAA)	
Allan Castro	Outfielder	Portland Sea Dogs (AA)	
Braiden Ward	Outfielder	Albuquerque Isotopes (AAA) / Hartford Yard Goats (AA)	

The team's equipment departed Fenway Park on February 2, colloquially known as "Truck Day", in preparation for their arrival in Fort Myers, Florida to begin Spring Training.

The Red Sox' first spring training was an exhibition contest against the Northeastern Huskies at Fenway South on February 20. The team's Grapefruit League schedule ran from February 21 through March 24, including a game on March 3 against Puerto Rico as one of Puerto Rico's friendly preparation games ahead of the 2026 World Baseball Classic. The Red Sox compiled a 13–16 record across their Grapefruit League contests.

=== 2026 World Baseball Classic ===
The World Baseball Classic (WBC), an international baseball tournament held every three to six years, took place from March 5 to March 17. The WBC coincided with MLB's spring training schedule, so the following Red Sox players did not take part in the full spring training schedule:

Player	Position	National team
Wilyer Abreu	Outfielder	Venezuela
Roman Anthony	Outfielder	United States
Brayan Bello	Pitcher	Dominican Republic
Willson Contreras	Infielder	Venezuela
Jarren Duran	Outfielder	Mexico
Nate Eaton	Infielder	Great Britain
Jovani Morán	Pitcher	Puerto Rico
Ceddanne Rafaela	Utility	Netherlands
Ranger Suárez	Pitcher	Venezuela
Greg Weissert	Pitcher	Italy
Garrett Whitlock	Pitcher	United States
Masataka Yoshida	Outfielder	Japan

Eight Red Sox players were on teams which reached the semifinal round of the WBC, and four players appeared in the final: Anthony and Whitlock for the United States and Abreu and Contreras for Venezuela. Abreu, Contreras, and Suárez were crowned champions of the tournament after Venezuela defeated the U.S. 3–2 in the final, and Anthony was subsequently named to the All-WBC Team.

== Regular season ==
=== Opening Day lineup ===
Order	No.	Player	Pos.
1	19	Roman Anthony	LF
2	10	Trevor Story	SS
3	16	Jarren Duran	DH
4	40	Willson Contreras	1B
5	5	Caleb Durbin	3B
6	52	Wilyer Abreu	RF
7	2	Isiah Kiner-Falefa	2B
8	75	Carlos Narvaez	C
9	3	Ceddanne Rafaela	CF
—	35	Garrett Crochet	P

== Season standings ==
=== American League East ===
AL East
Team	W	L	Pct.	GB	Home	Road
Tampa Bay Rays	98	64	.605	—	55‍–‍26	43‍–‍38
New York Yankees	93	68	.578	4½	46‍–‍34	47‍–‍34
Boston Red Sox	87	75	.537	11	41‍–‍40	46‍–‍35
Baltimore Orioles	79	82	.491	18½	39‍–‍42	40‍–‍40
Toronto Blue Jays	79	83	.488	19	42‍–‍39	37‍–‍44

=== American League Wild Card ===
Division leaders
Team	W	L	Pct.
Tampa Bay Rays	98	64	.605
Cleveland Guardians	85	77	.525
Houston Astros	81	81	.500

Wild Card teams (Top 3 teams qualify for postseason)
Team	W	L	Pct.	GB
New York Yankees	93	68	.578	+9½
Boston Red Sox	87	75	.537	+3
Chicago White Sox	84	78	.519	—
Texas Rangers	80	82	.494	4
Baltimore Orioles	79	82	.491	4½
Toronto Blue Jays	79	83	.488	5
Minnesota Twins	77	85	.475	7
Detroit Tigers	76	86	.469	8
Seattle Mariners	76	86	.469	8
Kansas City Royals	69	93	.426	15
Athletics	64	98	.395	20
Los Angeles Angels	62	100	.383	22

=== Record vs. opponents ===
==== Record vs. American League ====
2026 American League record Source: MLB Standings Grid – 2026
Team	ATH	BAL	BOS	CWS	CLE	DET	HOU	KC	LAA	MIN	NYY	SEA	TB	TEX	TOR	NL
Athletics	—	2–4	3–4	1–5	1–5	0–6	6–7	2–5	8–5	3–3	3–3	7–6	0–6	7–6	2–4	19–29
Baltimore	4–2	—	4–9	4–2	3–4	4–2	5–1	5–1	3–3	3–3	3–9	3–4	8–5	2–4	7–6	21–27
Boston	4–3	9–4	—	6–0	3–3	5–2	1–5	5–1	4–2	1–5	6–7	3–3	6–7	3–3	4–9	27–21
Chicago	5–1	2–4	0–6	—	7–6	9–4	2–5	9–4	4–2	8–5	3–4	3–3	2–4	4–2	5–1	21–27
Cleveland	5–1	4–3	3–3	6–7	—	10–3	2–4	7–6	6–0	6–7	2–4	4–3	1–5	2–4	2–4	25–23
Detroit	6–0	2–4	2–5	4–9	3–10	—	2–5	6–7	3–3	5–8	4–2	4–2	4–2	4–2	3–3	24–24
Houston	7–6	1–5	5–1	5–2	4–2	5–2	—	4–2	7–6	2–4	3–3	3–10	2–4	9–4	3–3	21–27
Kansas City	5–2	1–5	1–5	4–9	6–7	7–6	2–4	—	5–1	8–5	0–6	5–1	2–5	1–5	3–3	19–29
Los Angeles	5–8	3–3	2–4	2–4	0–6	3–3	6–7	1–5	—	3–4	3–4	6–7	3–3	8–5	2–4	15–33
Minnesota	3–3	3–3	5–1	5–8	7–6	8–5	4–2	5–8	4–3	—	3–3	2–4	1–5	5–1	4–3	18–30
New York	3–3	9–3	7–6	4–3	4–2	2–4	3–3	6–0	4–3	3–3	—	4–2	6–7	4–2	7–6	27–21
Seattle	6–7	4–3	3–3	3–3	3–4	2–4	10–3	1–5	7–6	4–2	2–4	—	1–5	5–8	2–4	23–25
Tampa Bay	6–0	5–8	7–6	4–2	5–1	2–4	4–2	5–2	3–3	5–1	7–6	5–1	—	4–3	9–4	27–21
Texas	6–7	4–2	3–3	2–4	4–2	2–4	4–9	5–1	5–8	1–5	2–4	8–5	3–4	—	6–1	25–23
Toronto	4–2	6–7	9–4	1–5	4–2	3–3	3–3	3–3	4–2	3–4	6–7	4–2	4–9	1–6	—	24–24

Updated with the results of all games through September 27, 2026.

==== Record vs. National League ====
2026 American League record vs. National League Source: MLB Standings
Team	AZ	ATL	CHC	CIN	COL	LAD	MIA	MIL	NYM	PHI	PIT	SD	SF	STL	WSH
Athletics	1–2	1–2	2–1	0–3	2–1	1–2	0–3	2–1	3–0	1–2	1–2	1–2	2–4	1–2	1–2
Baltimore	1–2	1–2	1–2	2–1	1–2	2–1	2–1	0–3	3–0	1–2	0–3	1–2	2–1	2–1	2–4
Boston	2–1	2–4	2–1	1–2	1–2	3–0	2–1	2–1	3–0	1–2	1–2	1–2	3–0	2–1	1–2
Chicago	2–1	2–1	3–3	1–2	2–1	2–1	1–2	0–3	2–1	1–2	0–3	2–1	1–2	1–2	1–2
Cleveland	1–2	1–2	2–1	4–2	3–0	2–1	3–0	1–2	0–3	2–1	1–2	1–2	2–1	1–2	1–2
Detroit	1–3	1–2	2–1	1–2	3–0	1–2	3–0	2–1	0–3	1–2	3–3	2–1	2–1	2–1	1–2
Houston	1–2	0–3	3–0	1–2	2–4	1–2	3–0	1–2	2–1	2–1	1–2	1–2	2–1	0–3	1–2
Kansas City	1–2	1–2	1–2	2–1	0–3	0–3	1–2	1–2	1–2	2–1	0–3	2–1	3–0	3–3	1–2
Los Angeles	1–2	1–2	1–2	2–1	1–2	1–5	1–2	1–2	1–2	0–3	1–2	1–2	1–2	2–1	0–3
Minnesota	2–1	3–0	1–2	0–3	2–1	0–3	2–1	2–4	1–2	0–3	0–3	0–3	2–1	2–1	1–2
New York	1–2	2–1	2–1	1–2	3–0	1–2	2–1	0–3	3–3	2–1	2–1	1–2	3–0	1–2	3–0
Seattle	3–0	2–1	2–1	1–2	2–1	1–2	0–3	1–2	2–1	2–1	1–2	0–6	2–1	3–0	1–2
Tampa Bay	3–0	2–1	1–2	1–2	3–0	0–3	3–3	1–2	1–2	2–1	1–2	3–0	3–0	1–2	2–1
Texas	4–2	1–2	2–1	0–3	2–1	1–2	1–2	1–2	1–2	2–1	2–1	2–1	2–1	2–1	2–1
Toronto	1–2	1–2	1–2	2–1	1–2	1–2	2–1	1–2	2–1	3–3	2–1	1–2	2–1	2–1	2–1

Updated with the results of all games through September 27, 2026.

== Game log ==
Color key
Red Sox win	Red Sox loss	Postponed	Clinched playoff spot

2026 Boston Red Sox Season Game Log: 87–75 (Home: 41–40; Away: 46–35)
March / April: 12–19 (Home: 5–8; Away: 7–11)

#	Date	Opponent	Score	Win	Loss	Save	Stadium	Attendance	Record	Box/ Streak
1	March 26	@ Reds	3–0	Crochet (1–0)	Johnson (0–1)	Chapman (1)	Great American Ball Park	43,897	1–0	W1
2	March 28	@ Reds	5–6 (11)	Phillips (1–0)	Slaten (0–1)	—	Great American Ball Park	38,298	1–1	L1
3	March 29	@ Reds	2–3	Burke (1–0)	Weissert (0–1)	Pagán (1)	Great American Ball Park	27,084	1–2	L2
4	March 30	@ Astros	1–8	McCullers Jr. (1–0)	Suárez (0–1)	—	Daikin Park	23,532	1–3	L3
5	March 31	@ Astros	2–9	Brown (1–0)	Bello (0–1)	Bolton (1)	Daikin Park	26,930	1–4	L4
6	April 1	@ Astros	4–6	Burrows (1–1)	Crochet (1–1)	Abreu (1)	Daikin Park	25,272	1–5	L5
7	April 3	Padres	5–2	Gray (1–0)	King (0–1)	Chapman (2)	Fenway Park	36,233	2–5	W1
8	April 4	Padres	2–3	Morejón (1–0)	Chapman (0–1)	Miller (3)	Fenway Park	36,405	2–6	L1
9	April 5	Padres	6–8	Estrada (1–1)	Uberstine (0–1)	Miller (4)	Fenway Park	29,240	2–7	L2
10	April 6	Brewers	6–8	Ashby (3–0)	Whitlock (0–1)	Zerpa (1)	Fenway Park	35,107	2–8	L3
11	April 7	Brewers	3–2	Crochet (2–1)	Misiorowski (1–1)	Chapman (3)	Fenway Park	33,193	3–8	W1
12	April 8	Brewers	5–0	Gray (2–0)	Drohan (0–1)	—	Fenway Park	28,660	4–8	W2
13	April 10	@ Cardinals	2–3	May (1–2)	Kelly (0–1)	O'Brien (4)	Busch Stadium	27,125	4–9	L1
14	April 11	@ Cardinals	7–1	Suárez (1–1)	Leahy (1–2)	—	Busch Stadium	31,664	5–9	W1
15	April 12	@ Cardinals	9–3	Bello (1–1)	Pallante (1–1)	—	Busch Stadium	25,122	6–9	W2
16	April 13	@ Twins	6–13	Ober (2–0)	Crochet (2–2)	—	Target Field	14,535	6–10	L1
17	April 14	@ Twins	0–6	Abel (1–2)	Gray (2–1)	—	Target Field	16,220	6–11	L2
18	April 15	@ Twins	9–5	Early (1–0)	Woods Richardson (0–3)	—	Target Field	21,276	7–11	W1
19	April 17	Tigers	1–0 (10)	Whitlock (1–1)	Vest (1–3)	—	Fenway Park	34,866	8–11	W2
20	April 18	Tigers	1–4	Skubal (3–2)	Bello (1–2)	Jansen (5)	Fenway Park	36,527	8–12	L1
21	April 19	Tigers	2–6	Valdez (2–1)	Crochet (2–3)	—	Fenway Park	34,650	8–13	L2
22	April 20	Tigers	8–6	Whitlock (2–1)	Holton (0–1)	Chapman (4)	Fenway Park	34,880	9–13	W1
23	April 21	Yankees	0–4	Gil (1–1)	Early (1–1)	—	Fenway Park	34,391	9–14	L1
24	April 22	Yankees	1–4	Fried (3–1)	Suárez (1–2)	—	Fenway Park	34,049	9–15	L2
25	April 23	Yankees	2–4	Schlittler (3–1)	Coulombe (0–1)	Bednar (7)	Fenway Park	36,565	9–16	L3
26	April 24	@ Orioles	3–10	Young (2–0)	Bello (1–3)	—	Camden Yards	26,776	9–17	L4
27	April 25	@ Orioles	17–1	Crochet (3–3)	Rogers (2–3)	—	Camden Yards	33,582	10–17	W1
28	April 26	@ Orioles	5–3	Early (2–1)	Bradish (1–3)	Chapman (5)	Camden Yards	32,511	11–17	W2
29	April 27	@ Blue Jays	5–0	Suárez (2–2)	Cease (1–1)	—	Rogers Centre	41,785	12–17	W3
30	April 28	@ Blue Jays	0–3	Yesavage (1–0)	Tolle (0–1)	Varland (4)	Rogers Centre	41,949	12–18	L1
31	April 29	@ Blue Jays	1–8	Fisher (2–0)	Bello (1–4)	—	Rogers Centre	41,314	12–19	L2

May: 13–14 (Home: 4–11; Away: 9–3)

#	Date	Opponent	Score	Win	Loss	Save	Stadium	Attendance	Record	Box/ Streak
32	May 1	Astros	3–1	Bennett (1–0)	Burrows (1–4)	Chapman (6)	Fenway Park	34,630	13–19	W1
33	May 2	Astros	3–6	Arrighetti (4–0)	Early (2–2)	King (2)	Fenway Park	34,158	13–20	L1
34	May 3	Astros	1–3 (10)	Abreu (1-2)	Kelly (0-2)	—	Fenway Park	35,406	13–21	L2
35	May 4	@ Tigers	5–4	Tolle (1–1)	Vanasco (0–1)	Chapman (7)	Comerica Park	22,321	14–21	W1
36	May 5	@ Tigers	10–3	Bello (2–4)	Valdez (2–2)	—	Comerica Park	20,674	15–21	W2
37	May 6	@ Tigers	4–0	Gray (3–1)	Flaherty (0–3)	—	Comerica Park	17,334	16–21	W3
38	May 7	Rays	4–8	Bigge (1–0)	Bennett (1–1)	—	Fenway Park	33,961	16–22	L1
39	May 8	Rays	2–0	Early (3–2)	Scholtens (3–2)	Chapman (8)	Fenway Park	35,052	17–22	W1
—	May 9	Rays	Postponed due to rain. Makeup date July 17.							
40	May 10	Rays	1–4	Martinez (4–1)	Tolle (1–2)	Baker (10)	Fenway Park	33,489	17–23	L1
41	May 12	Phillies	1–2	Wheeler (2–0)	Morán (0–1)	Durán (6)	Fenway Park	36,795	17–24	L2
42	May 13	Phillies	3–1	Gray (4–1)	Banks (0–3)	Chapman (9)	Fenway Park	35,451	18–24	W1
43	May 14	Phillies	1–3	Keller (2–1)	Samaniego (0–1)	Durán (7)	Fenway Park	31,046	18–25	L1
44	May 15	@ Braves	2–3 (10)	Fuentes (3–0)	Samaniego (0–2)	—	Truist Park	39,288	18–26	L2
45	May 16	@ Braves	3–2	Tolle (2–2)	Elder (4–2)	Chapman (10)	Truist Park	39,336	19–26	W1
46	May 17	@ Braves	1–8	Holmes (3–1)	Bello (2–5)	—	Truist Park	37,800	19–27	L1
47	May 18	@ Royals	3–1	Gray (5–1)	Lugo (1–4)	Chapman (11)	Kauffman Stadium	15,531	20–27	W1
48	May 19	@ Royals	7–1	Whitlock (3–1)	Falter (0–1)	—	Kauffman Stadium	14,047	21–27	W2
49	May 20	@ Royals	4–3	Early (4–2)	Cruz (0–2)	Chapman (12)	Kauffman Stadium	14,091	22–27	W3
50	May 22	Twins	6–8	Adams (1–0)	Slaten (0–2)	Banda (1)	Fenway Park	34,740	22–28	L1
51	May 23	Twins	2–4	Bradley (5–1)	Morán (0–2)	Rogers (2)	Fenway Park	37,105	22–29	L2
52	May 24	Twins	5–6	Ober (6–2)	Guerrero (0–1)	Adams (1)	Fenway Park	31,050	22–30	L3
53	May 26	Braves	6–7	Strider (3–0)	Suárez (2–3)	Iglesias (9)	Fenway Park	34,126	22–31	L4
54	May 27	Braves	8–0	Early (5–2)	Elder (4–3)	—	Fenway Park	34,093	23–31	W1
55	May 28	Braves	2–10	Sale (8–3)	Coulombe (0–2)	—	Fenway Park	30,901	23–32	L1
56	May 29	@ Guardians	3–4	Holderman (3–0)	Samaniego (0–3)	Smith (20)	Progressive Field	34,404	23–33	L2
57	May 30	@ Guardians	9–1	Gray (6–1)	Festa (1–1)	—	Progressive Field	35,740	24–33	W1
58	May 31	@ Guardians	9–4	Morán (1–2)	Holderman (3–1)	—	Progressive Field	28,798	25–33	W2

June: 12–14 (Home: 8–7; Away: 4–7)

#	Date	Opponent	Score	Win	Loss	Save	Stadium	Attendance	Record	Box/ Streak
59	June 2	Orioles	2–4	Baz (3–5)	Early (5–3)	Garcia (4)	Fenway Park	35,004	25–34	L1
60	June 3	Orioles	8–1	Tolle (3–2)	Bassitt (4–4)	Watson (1)	Fenway Park	36,872	26–34	W1
61	June 4	Orioles	2–8	Rogers (3–6)	Bello (2–6)	—	Fenway Park	33,180	26–35	L1
62	June 5	@ Yankees	5–3	Gray (7–1)	Weathers (2–4)	Chapman (13)	Yankee Stadium	43,750	27–35	W1
—	June 6	@ Yankees	Postponed due to rain. Makeup date August 29.							
63	June 7	@ Yankees	1–6	Hill (3–2)	Slaten (0–3)	—	Yankee Stadium	46,144	27–36	L1
64	June 8	@ Rays	1–3	Legumina (2–1)	Early (5–4)	Baker (17)	Tropicana Field	14,579	27–37	L2
65	June 9	@ Rays	3–4	Martinez (6–2)	Tolle (3–3)	Baker (18)	Tropicana Field	15,503	27–38	L3
66	June 10	@ Rays	5–7	Rasmussen (6–2)	Bennett (1–2)	Cleavinger (2)	Tropicana Field	16,504	27–39	L4
67	June 12	Rangers	10–1	Gray (8–1)	Leiter (3–6)	—	Fenway Park	33,919	28–39	W1
68	June 13	Rangers	6–3	Whitlock (4–1)	Winn (2–2)	Chapman (14)	Fenway Park	34,556	29–39	W2
69	June 14	Rangers	4–6	Eovaldi (6–7)	Early (5–5)	Latz (12)	Fenway Park	32,006	29–40	L1
70	June 16	Blue Jays	1–6	Cease (4–3)	Tolle (3–4)	Varland (13)	Fenway Park	32,392	29–41	L2
71	June 17	Blue Jays	0–3	Woods Richardson (1–7)	Bennett (1–3)	Varland (14)	Fenway Park	35,817	29–42	L3
72	June 18	Blue Jays	3–4	Nance (1–2)	Chapman (0–2)	Fluharty (1)	Fenway Park	32,027	29–43	L4
73	June 19	@ Mariners	6–2	Suárez (3–3)	Miller (3–1)	—	T-Mobile Park	45,775	30–43	W1
74	June 20	@ Mariners	5–1	Early (6–5)	Hancock (5–4)	—	T-Mobile Park	45,663	31–43	W2
75	June 21	@ Mariners	1–3	Gilbert (6–4)	Tolle (3–5)	Muñoz (13)	T-Mobile Park	45,577	31–44	L1
76	June 22	@ Rockies	2–3	Vodnik (2–2)	Chapman (0–3)	―	Coors Field	26,910	31–45	L2
77	June 23	@ Rockies	5–2	Gray (9–1)	Sullivan (0–2)	—	Coors Field	29,961	32–45	W1
78	June 24	@ Rockies	6–8	Senzatela (8–0)	Slaten (0–4)	Herget (2)	Coors Field	27,879	32–46	L1
79	June 25	Yankees	6–3	Early (7–5)	Schlittler (8–4)	Chapman (15)	Fenway Park	36,307	33–46	W1
80	June 26	Yankees	6–1	Tolle (4–5)	Warren (7–3)	—	Fenway Park	33,353	34–46	W2
81	June 27	Yankees	4–1	Bennett (2–3)	Cole (2–3)	Chapman (16)	Fenway Park	36,026	35–46	W3
82	June 28	Yankees	5–4 (10)	Slaten (1–4)	Cruz (4–3)	—	Fenway Park	34,573	36–46	W4
83	June 29	Nationals	6–3	Suárez (4–3)	Mikolas (2–7)	Whitlock (1)	Fenway Park	32,000	37–46	W5
84	June 30	Nationals	1–8	Cavalli (5–4)	Weissert (0–2)	—	Fenway Park	33,669	37–47	L1

July: 21–4 (Home: 8–3; Away: 13–1)

#	Date	Opponent	Score	Win	Loss	Save	Stadium	Attendance	Record	Box/ Streak
85	July 1	Nationals	2–10	Alvarez (2–1)	Tolle (4–6)	—	Fenway Park	32,574	37–48	L2
86	July 3	@ Angels	5–2	Bennett (3–3)	Detmers (3–6)	Chapman (17)	Angel Stadium	43,747	38–48	W1
87	July 4	@ Angels	8–1	Gray (10–1)	Aldegheri (3–4)	—	Angel Stadium	43,599	39–48	W2
88	July 5	@ Angels	7–5	Suárez (5–3)	Johnson (1–4)	Chapman (18)	Angel Stadium	35,992	40–48	W3
89	July 7	@ White Sox	8–1	Tolle (5–6)	Schultz (2–6)	—	Rate Field	25,392	41–48	W4
90	July 8	@ White Sox	5–0	Bennett (4–3)	Martin (9–4)	—	Rate Field	23,973	42–48	W5
91	July 9	@ White Sox	2–1	Guerrero (1–1)	Kay (6–4)	Chapman (19)	Rate Field	19,148	43–48	W6
92	July 10	@ Mets	6–2	Gray (11–1)	McLean (6–6)	—	Citi Field	38,090	44–48	W7
93	July 11	@ Mets	4–0	Morán (2–2)	Peralta (5–8)	—	Citi Field	38,371	45–48	W8
94	July 12	@ Mets	3–2 (10)	Chapman (1–3)	Raley (4–4)	Whitlock (2)	Citi Field	37,638	46–48	W9
ASG	July 14	All-Star Game	4–0	Cease (1–0)	Sánchez (0–1)	—	Citizens Bank Park	43,916	―	―
95	July 17 (1)	Rays	10–0	Bennett (5–3)	Jax (5–7)	Gamboa (1)	Fenway Park	36,774	47–48	W10
96	July 17 (2)	Rays	5–3	Weissert (2–2)	Englert (0–3)	Chapman (20)	Fenway Park	34,255	48–48	W11
97	July 18	Rays	7–6	Watson (1–0)	Cleavinger (2–3)	Chapman (21)	Fenway Park	30,077	49–48	W12
98	July 19	Rays	6–1	Gray (12–1)	McClanahan (8–6)	—	Fenway Park	32,950	50–48	W13
99	July 20	Orioles	6–5	Whitlock (5–1)	Wells (2–2)	Chapman (22)	Fenway Park	37,659	51–48	W14
—	July 21	Orioles	Postponed due to rain. Makeup date July 22.							
100	July 22 (1)	Orioles	6–3	Bennett (6–3)	Kremer (1–3)	Chapman (23)	Fenway Park	35,039	52–48	W15
101	July 22 (2)	Orioles	1–5	Bradish (7–9)	Rivera (0–1)	—	Fenway Park	38,005	52–49	L1
102	July 24	Blue Jays	6–4	Whitlock (6–1)	Van Eyk (0–1)	Chapman (24)	Fenway Park	37,405	53–49	W1
103	July 25	Blue Jays	0–6	Cease (7–5)	Gray (12–2)	—	Fenway Park	36,902	53–50	L1
104	July 26	Blue Jays	6–1	Weissert (3–2)	Gausman (4–10)	—	Fenway Park	36,795	54–50	W1
105	July 27	@ Athletics	4–2	Tolle (6–6)	Perkins (2–6)	Chapman (25)	Sutter Health Park	10,486	55–50	W2
106	July 28	@ Athletics	3–4	Jump (4–6)	Bennett (6–4)	Harris (9)	Sutter Health Park	10,356	55–51	L1
107	July 29	@ Athletics	4–2 (10)	Chapman (2–3)	Suárez (1–3)	Weissert (1)	Sutter Health Park	9,674	56–51	W1
108	July 30	@ Athletics	5–4	Gray (13–2)	Medina (2–3)	Chapman (26)	Sutter Health Park	10,246	57–51	W2
109	July 31	@ Dodgers	9–4	Bello (3–6)	Irvin (0–1)	—	Dodger Stadium	47,903	58–51	W3

August: 17–11 (Home: 10–3; Away: 7–8)

#	Date	Opponent	Score	Win	Loss	Save	Stadium	Attendance	Record	Box/ Streak
110	August 1	@ Dodgers	3–2	Slaten (2–4)	Yamamoto (11–7)	Chapman (27)	Dodger Stadium	49,291	59–51	W4
111	August 2	@ Dodgers	8–4	Bennett (7–4)	Sheehan (4–8)	—	Dodger Stadium	46,834	60–51	W5
112	August 4	White Sox	14–2	Sandoval (1–0)	Martin (9–6)	Bello (1)	Fenway Park	37,669	61–51	W6
113	August 5	White Sox	4–0	Gray (14–2)	Burke (7–6)	—	Fenway Park	37,517	62–51	W7
114	August 6	White Sox	12–11 (13)	Bello (4–6)	Fedde (6–7)	—	Fenway Park	37,082	63–51	W8
115	August 7	Athletics	13–1	Tolle (7–6)	Perkins (2–8)	Burgos (1)	Fenway Park	37,227	64–51	W9
116	August 8	Athletics	3–7	Jump (5–7)	Bennett (7–5)	Harris (10)	Fenway Park	36,696	64–52	L1
117	August 9	Athletics	3–4	Alvarado (4–3)	Chapman (2–4)	Harris (11)	Fenway Park	36,817	64–53	L2
118	August 10	@ Blue Jays	1–2	Woods Richardson (2–7)	Gray (14–3)	Varland (25)	Rogers Centre	42,511	64–54	L3
119	August 11	@ Blue Jays	3–5	Lee (1–0)	Sandoval (1–1)	Miles (1)	Rogers Centre	42,419	64–55	L4
120	August 12	@ Blue Jays	4–6	Rogers (2–2)	Guerrero (1–2)	Varland (26)	Rogers Centre	42,888	64–56	L5
121	August 13	@ Blue Jays	7–0	Tolle (8–6)	Scherzer (1–5)	—	Rogers Centre	43,422	65–56	W1
122	August 14	@ Pirates	4–8	Chandler (6–8)	Bennett (7–6)	Montgomery (4)	PNC Park	32,036	65–57	L1
123	August 15	@ Pirates	4–0	Gray (15–3)	Jones (2–5)	—	PNC Park	38,408	66–57	W1
124	August 16	@ Pirates	3–8	Yates (1–5)	Sandoval (1–2)	—	PNC Park	25,575	66–58	L1
125	August 17	Diamondbacks	11–1	Bello (5–6)	Bratt (1–2)	—	Fenway Park	36,511	67–58	W1
126	August 18	Diamondbacks	9–4	Suárez (5–3)	Kelly (8–11)	—	Fenway Park	36,592	68–58	W2
127	August 19	Diamondbacks	6–7 (10)	Loáisiga (4–3)	Morán (2–3)	—	Fenway Park	36,540	68–59	L1
128	August 21	Giants	6–4	Gray (16–3)	Webb (8–8)	Chapman (28)	Fenway Park	37,007	69–59	W1
129	August 22	Giants	3–2	Olds (1–0)	Hentges (1–6)	—	Fenway Park	36,478	70–59	W2
130	August 23	Giants	5–4	Bennett (8–6)	Wilkinson (0–1)	Chapman (29)	Fenway Park	36,278	71–59	W3
131	August 24	@ Marlins	4–2	Miller (3–0)	Fairbanks (4–5)	Chapman (30)	LoanDepot Park	16,247	72–59	W4
132	August 25	@ Marlins	7–3 (11)	Gamboa (1–0)	Gibson (2–1)	—	LoanDepot Park	16,821	73–59	W5
133	August 26	@ Marlins	0–4	Gusto (2–3)	Gray (16–5)	—	LoanDepot Park	17,472	73–60	L1
134	August 28	@ Yankees	0–1	Schlittler (12–6)	Sandoval (1–3)	Bednar (31)	Yankee Stadium	43,476	73–61	L2
135	August 29 (1)	@ Yankees	6–0	Bennett (9–6)	Rodón (4–3)	—	Yankee Stadium	47,314	74–61	W1
136	August 29 (2)	@ Yankees	2–9	Blackburn (7–2)	Bello (5–7)	—	Yankee Stadium	44,266	74–62	L1
137	August 30	@ Yankees	1–16	Warren (9–6)	Suárez (5–4)	—	Yankee Stadium	45,256	74–63	L2
138	August 31	Mariners	9–8 (10)	Chapman (3–4)	Criswell (2–2)	—	Fenway Park	37,487	75–63	W1

September: 13–11 (Home: 6–8; Away: 6–4)

#	Date	Opponent	Score	Win	Loss	Save	Stadium	Attendance	Record	Box/ Streak
139	September 1	Mariners	9–6	Woo (10–9)	Páez (0–1)	—	Fenway Park	35,758	75–64	L1
140	September 2	Mariners	3–8	Criswell (3–2)	Sandoval (1–4)	—	Fenway Park	33,922	75–65	L2
141	September 3	@ Orioles	6–5	Miller (4–0)	De León (0–2)	Chapman (31)	Camden Yards	19,720	76–65	W1
142	September 4	@ Orioles	1–0	Suárez (6–4)	Baz (5–15)	Chapman (32)	Camden Yards	19,821	77–65	W2
143	September 5	@ Orioles	5–0	Gray (17–4)	Bassitt (6–5)	—	Camden Yards	32,207	78–65	W3
144	September 6	@ Orioles	3–1	Tolle (9–6)	Bradish (7–13)	Chapman (33)	Camden Yards	27,596	79–65	W4
145	September 7	Angels	5–2	Bello (6–7)	Rodriguez (4–7)	Whitlock (3)	Fenway Park	36,787	80–65	W5
146	September 8	Angels	1–6	Detmers (5–8)	Sandoval (1–5)	—	Fenway Park	36,028	80–66	L1
147	September 9	Angels	4–6	Johnson (4–8)	Bennett (9–7)	Joyce (4)	Fenway Park	35,428	80–67	L2
148	September 11	Royals	2–3	Lugo (7–8)	Gray (17–5)	Cruz (7)	Fenway Park	36,890	80–68	L3
149	September 12	Royals	5–1	Suárez (7–4)	Dobnak (3–4)	—	Fenway Park	36,877	81–68	W1
150	September 13	Royals	4–1	Whitlock (7–1)	Kimbrel (1–5)	Chapman (34)	Fenway Park	34,966	82–68	W2
151	September 15	@ Rangers	2–4	deGrom (11–9)	Sandoval (1–6)	Latz (30)	Globe Life Field	30,907	82–69	L1
152	September 16	@ Rangers	3–7	Eovaldi (11–9)	Miller (4–1)	—	Globe Life Field	26,364	82–70	L2
153	September 17	@ Rangers	4–3	Olds (2–0)	Latz (3–3)	Whitlock (4)	Globe Life Field	30,828	83–70	W1
154	September 18	@ Rays	4–2	Suárez (8–4)	Seymour (9–7)	Miller (5)	Tropicana Field	23,342	84–70	W2
155	September 19	@ Rays	1–2	Baker (4–2)	Whitlock (7–2)	—	Tropicana Field	27,402	84–71	L1
156	September 20	@ Rays	1–5	Jax (8–10)	Sandoval (1–7)	—	Tropicana Field	24,654	84–72	L2
157	September 22	Guardians	2–3	Gaddis (5–3)	Miller (4–2)	Smith (40)	Fenway Park	37,416	84–73	L3
158	September 23	Guardians	1–0	Gray (18–5)	Griffin (15–6)	Chapman (35)	Fenway Park	36,360	85–73	W1
159	September 24	Guardians	0–1	Cantillo (11–9)	Suárez (8–5)	Smith (41)	Fenway Park	36,711	85–74	L1
160	September 25	Cubs (1)	4–3	Weissert (4–2)	Civale (6–8)	Burgos (2)	Fenway Park	33,506	86–74	W1
161	September 25	Cubs (2)	2–0	Páez (1–1)	Assad (6–2)	—	Fenway Park	36,449	87–74	W2
—	September 26	Cubs	Rescheduled due to inclement weather, see Note							
162	September 27	Cubs	2–6	Garrett (1–1)	Houck (0–1)	Rea (2)	Tropicana Field	20,411	87–75	W1

Note: due to inclement weather, changes were made to the final three games of the regular season, which were originally scheduled for September 25, 26, and 27. The September 27 game was moved to September 25 as part of a split-admission doubleheader. The September 26 game was subsequently rescheduled to September 27 and relocated to Tropicana Field in St. Petersburg, Florida. This Red Sox "home" game became the first to be played outside of Boston since the team faced the Yankees in the MLB London Series in 2019, and the first instance of a Boston-scheduled home game being relocated in franchise history.

=== Grand slams ===
No.	Date	Red Sox batter	H/A	Pitcher	Opposing team	Ref.
1	April 25	Andruw Monasterio	A	Keegan Akin	Baltimore Orioles	
2	July 27	Ceddanne Rafaela	A	José Suárez	Athletics	
3	August 4	Caleb Durbin	H	Davis Martin	Chicago White Sox	
4	August 13	Caleb Durbin	A	Chase Lee	Toronto Blue Jays	
5	August 25	Jarren Duran	A	Cade Gibson	Miami Marlins	

=== Immaculate innings ===
No.	Date	Red Sox pitcher	Red Sox catcher	H/A	Batters	Opposing team	Ref.
1	September 13	Payton Tolle	Adley Rutschman	H	Nick Loftin; Bobby Witt Jr. Jac Caglianone	Kansas City Royals	

=== Ejections ===
No.	Date	Red Sox personnel	H/A	Opposing team	Ref.
1	March 28	Alex Cora	Away	Cincinnati Reds	
2	June 25	Andrew Bailey	Home	New York Yankees	
3	June 29	Willson Contreras	Home	Washington Nationals	
4	June 30	Willson Contreras	Home	Washington Nationals	
5	June 30	Nate Eaton	Home	Washington Nationals	
6	June 30	Chad Tracy	Home	Washington Nationals	

=== All-Star Game representation ===
Position	Player	Statistics
1B	Willson Contreras	1 AB, 1 H; Home Run Derby participant: 21 HR total
CF	Ceddanne Rafaela	2 AB, 0 H, 1 K
RP	Aroldis Chapman	2/3 IP, 0.00 ERA, 1 K
SP	Ranger Suárez	Selected as All-Star, did not play (injury)

== Postseason ==
=== Game log ===
Boston Red Sox 2026 Postseason Game Log (0–2)
American League Wild Card Series vs. Yankees (0–2)

#	Date	Opponent	Score	Win	Loss	Save	Stadium	Attendance	Series	Box/ Streak
1	September 29	@ Yankees	0–9	Schlittler (1–0)	Tolle (0–1)	—	Yankee Stadium	48,437	0–1	L1
2	September 30	@ Yankees	2–9	Fried (1–0)	Gray (0–1)	—	Yankee Stadium	49,004	0–2	L2

=== American League Wild Card Series at New York Yankees ===
Game 1, September 29

Tuesday, September 29 8:15 pm (EDT) at Yankee Stadium in The Bronx, New York; 69 °F (21 °C), Cloudy
Team	1	2	3	4	5	6	7	8	9	R	H	E
Boston	0	0	0	0	0	0	0	0	0	0	3	0
New York	0	1	0	0	1	0	2	5	X	9	12	0
WP: Cam Schlittler (1–0) LP: Payton Tolle (0–1); Home runs: BOS: None; NYY: Ben Rice (2); Attendance: 48,437; Boxscore

Game 2, September 30

Wednesday, September 30, 2026 8:00 p.m. EDT at Yankee Stadium, The Bronx, New York; 68 °F (20 °C), Overcast
Team	1	2	3	4	5	6	7	8	9	R	H	E
Boston	0	0	0	0	0	1	1	0	0	2	4	1
New York	0	0	0	1	1	6	1	0	X	9	14	0
WP: Max Fried (1–0) LP: Sonny Gray (0–1); Home runs: BOS: Willson Contreras (1), Nick Sogard (1); NYY: Luis García Jr. (1), Cody Bellinger (1); Attendance: 49,004; Boxscore

=== Postseason rosters ===
Playoff rosters
American League Wild Card Series

- Pitchers: 66 Brayan Bello 64 Jake Bennett 44 Aroldis Chapman 35 Garrett Crochet 68 Alec Gamboa 54 Sonny Gray 67 Erik Miller 75 Wyatt Olds 55 Ranger Suárez 70 Payton Tolle 57 Greg Weissert 22 Garrett Whitlock
- Catchers: 31 Adley Rutschman 12 Connor Wong
- Infielders: 40 Willson Contreras 5 Caleb Durbin 2 Isiah Kiner-Falefa 32 Andruw Monasterio 10 Trevor Story
- Outfielders: 52 Wilyer Abreu 19 Roman Anthony 16 Jarren Duran 37 Jahmai Jones 3 Ceddanne Rafaela
- Infielders/Outfielders: 18 Nate Eaton 20 Nick Sogard

== Roster ==
2026 Boston Red Sox
Roster
Pitchers: 77 Jack Anderson; 66 Brayan Bello; 64 Jake Bennett; 79 Raymond Burgos; 44 Aroldis Chapman; 67 Danny Coulombe; 35 Garrett Crochet; 71 Connelly Early; 68 Alec Gamboa; 54 Sonny Gray; 41 Tyron Guerrero; 89 Tanner Houck; 46 Tommy Kahnle; 76 Zack Kelly; 60 Joe La Sorsa; 51 Seth Martinez; 67 Erik Miller; 47 Jovani Morán; 75 Wyatt Olds; 29 Johan Oviedo; 65 Jedixson Páez; 99 Eduardo Rivera; 78 Tyler Samaniego; 43 Patrick Sandoval; 63 Justin Slaten; 55 Ranger Suárez; 70 Payton Tolle; 79 Tyler Uberstine; 56 Ryan Watson; 57 Greg Weissert; 22 Garrett Whitlock	Catchers: 30 Mickey Gasper; 75 Carlos Narváez; 46 Jake Rogers; 31 Adley Rutschman; 12 Connor Wong; Infielders: 39 Tsung-Che Cheng; 40 Willson Contreras; 5 Caleb Durbin; 23 Romy González; 25 Brett Harris; 2 Isiah Kiner-Falefa; 11 Marcelo Mayer; 25 Curtis Mead; 32 Andruw Monasterio; 48 Anthony Seigler; 20 Nick Sogard; 10 Trevor Story	Outfielders: 52 Wilyer Abreu; 19 Roman Anthony; 16 Jarren Duran; 18 Nate Eaton; 37 Jahmai Jones; 3 Ceddanne Rafaela; 38 Eli White; 7 Masataka Yoshida	Manager: 13 Alex Cora; 17 Chad Tracy; Coaches: 53 Andrew Bailey (pitching); 83 Pablo Cabrera (first base/outfield, interim); 81 Joe Cronin (hitting strategist); 81 Chad Epperson (third base, interim); 62 Peter Fatse (hitting); 58 José David Flores (first base/infield) (bench, interim); 86 Parker Guinn (bullpen catcher/catching instructor); 84 Collin Hetzler (interim hitting); 59 Chris Holt (bullpen); 84 Kyle Hudson (third base/outfield); 88 Dillon Lawson (assistant hitting); 90 Charlie Madden (bullpen catcher); 88 Nelson Paulino (hitting, interim); 82 Devin Rose (pitching strategist); 92 Jack Simonetty (interim hitting assistant); 85 John Soteropulos (hitting); 91 Chris Stasio (director ML development); 33 Jason Varitek (game planning/run prevention); 60 Ramón Vázquez (bench)

=== Transactions ===
April transactions

==== April ====
- April 3: The team placed pitcher Johan Oviedo on the 15-day injured list with right elbow strain, retroactive to March 31, and pitcher Garrett Whitlock on the paternity list. The team also recalled pitchers Tyler Uberstine and Zack Kelly from the Worcester Red Sox.
- April 5: The team traded pitching prospect Patrick Galle to the St. Louis Cardinals as the PTBNL to complete their trade with St. Louis for Sonny Gray.
- April 6: The team optioned pitcher Tyler Uberstine to Worcester, and activated pitcher Garrett Whitlock from the paternity list.
- April 8: The team recalled pitcher Tyler Samaniego from Worcester, and sent Patrick Sandoval to Worcester on rehab assignment.
- April 9: The team sent second baseman Anthony Seigler to Worcester on rehab assignment.
- April 10: The team activated Anthony Seigler from the 10-day injured list, and optioned him to Worcester.
- April 11: The team sent Kutter Crawford to Worcester on rehab assignment.
- April 14: The team transferred pitcher Johan Oviedo from the 15-day injured list to the 60-day injured list with right elbow strain, optioned pitcher Tyler Samaniego to Worcester, and selected pitcher Jack Anderson to the Red Sox.
- April 21: The team recalled Tyler Samaniego from Worcester, and placed pitcher Sonny Gray on the 15-day injured list with a right hamstring strain.
- April 22: The team optioned Jack Anderson to Worcester, selected the contract of Eduardo Rivera to the Red Sox, and transferred Triston Casas from the 10-day injured list to the 60-day injured list for recovery from left patellar tendon repair.
- April 23: The team optioned Eduardo Rivera to Worcester, and recalled Payton Tolle from Worcester to the Red Sox.
- April 29: The team placed pitcher Garrett Crochet on the 15-day injured list, retroactive to April 26, with left shoulder inflammation. The team also recalled Nate Eaton from Worcester.
- April 30: The team optioned Nate Eaton to Worcester.

May transactions

==== May ====
- May 1: The team recalled pitcher Jake Bennett from Worcester.
- May 4: The team placed pitchers Danny Coulombe on the 15-day injured list, retroactive to May 2, with cervical spasms, and placed Patrick Sandoval on the 60-day injured list for recovery from UCL surgery. The team also selected the contract of pitcher Alec Gamboa from Worcester.
- May 6: The team optioned pitcher Alec Gamboa to Worcester, and activated pitcher Sonny Gray from the 15-day injured list. The team also sent Justin Slaten to Worcester on rehab assignment.
- May 7: The team recalled catcher Mickey Gasper from Worcester, and placed Roman Anthony on the 10-day injured list with a right wrist sprain, retroactive to May 5.
- May 8: The team optioned Jake Bennett and recalled Jack Anderson between Worcester.
- May 9: The team optioned Jack Anderson to Worcester, and activated Justin Slaten from the 15-day injured list.
- May 15: The team sent Danny Coulombe on rehab assignment to the Portland Sea Dogs.
- May 16: The team recalled Nick Sogard from Worcester, and placed shortstop Trevor Story on the 10-day injured list, retroactive to May 15, with a sports hernia.
- May 19: The team sent Danny Coulombe on rehab assignment to Worcester.
- May 22: The team optioned Zack Kelly to Worcester, and selected the contract of Tyron Guerrero from Worcester.
- May 24: The team optioned Tyler Samaniego to Worcester, and activated Danny Coulombe from the 15-day injured list.
- May 28: The team placed Garrett Whitlock on the 15-day injured list with left knee inflammation, retroactive to May 25, and recalled Tyler Samaniego from Worcester.

June transactions

==== June ====
- June 3: The team placed infielder Nick Sogard on the 10-day injured list for a right oblique strain, retroactive to May 31, and recalled infielder Anthony Seigler from Worcester.
- June 4: The team selected the contract of pitcher Tommy Kahnle from Worcester, and optioned pitcher Tyler Samaniego to Worcester. The team also transferred shortstop Trevor Story from the 10-day injured list to the 60-day injured list with a sports hernia, and received pitcher Joe La Sorsa in a trade with the Pittsburgh Pirates.
- June 5: The Team optioned pitcher Brayan Bello to Worcester, and selected the contract of pitcher Joe La Sorsa from Worcester. The team also sent pitcher Patrick Sandoval on rehab assignment to Worcester, and transferred pitcher Garrett Crochet from the 15-day injured list to the 60-day injured list with left shoulder inflammation.
- June 6: The team sent pitcher Garrett Whitlock on rehab assignment to Worcester, recalled pitcher Alec Gamboa from Worcester, and placed pitcher Jovani Morán on the 15-day injured list retroactive to June 5 with left elbow inflammation.
- June 8: The team recalled outfielder Nate Eaton from Worcester, and optioned pitcher Joe La Sorsa to Worcester.
- June 9: The team optioned infielder Anthony Seigler to Worcester, and activated pitcher Garrett Whitlock from the 15-day injured list.
- June 10: The team optioned pitcher Alec Gamboa to Worcester, and recalled pitcher Jake Bennett from Worcester.
- June 16: The team sent utility Romy González on rehab assignment to Portland.
- June 17: The team sent pitcher Patrick Sandoval on rehab assignment to Portland.
- June 20: The team placed utility Isiah Kiner-Falefa on the 10-day injured list retroactive to June 19 with left forearm inflammation, and recalled infielder Anthony Seigler from Worcester.
- June 23: The team sent utility Romy González and pitcher Patrick Sandoval on rehab assignments to Worcester.
- June 25: The team sent pitcher Jovani Morán on rehab assignment to Worcester.
- June 26: The team placed infielder Marcelo Mayer on the 10-day injured list with a bone stress reaction to the left ulna, and recalled infielder Tsung-Che Cheng from Worcester.
- June 28: The team activated utility Romy González from the 60-day injured list, transferred outfielder Roman Anthony from the 10-day injured list to the 60-day injured list, and optioned catcher Mickey Gasper to Worcester.

July transactions

==== July ====
- July 1: The team designated pitcher Tommy Kahnle for assignment and recalled pitcher Alec Gamboa from Worcester, activated pitcher Jovani Morán from the 15-day injured list and placed pitcher Connelly Early on the 15-day injured list with left elbow inflammation, and traded minor league pitcher Ben Hansen to the Athletics in exchange for third baseman Brett Harris.
- July 2: The team sent infielder Nick Sogard on rehab assignment to Portland.
- July 3: The team sent pitcher Tommy Kahnle outright to Worcester.
- July 4: The team sent pitcher Patrick Sandoval on rehab assignment to Portland.
- July 6: The team activated pitcher Patrick Sandoval from the 60-day injured list, placed pitcher Ranger Suarez on the 15-day injured list with left groin strain, optioned pitcher Alec Gamboa to Worcester and designated pitcher Jack Anderson for assignment.
- July 7: The team sent infielder Nick Sogard on rehab assignment to Worcester. Outfielder Nate Eaton was suspended.
- July 9: The team recalled infielder Brett Harris from Worcester, and first baseman Willson Contreras was suspended. Nate Eaton was activated from suspension.
- July 11: The team recalled pitcher Eduardo Rivera from Worcester, and optioned infielder Brett Harris to Worcester.
- July 12: The team activated infielder Nick Sogard from the 10-day injured list and optioned him to Worcester, recalled pitcher Brayan Bello from Worcester, and designated pitcher Danny Coulombe for assignment.
- July 14: The team traded a player to be named later to the Detroit Tigers for outfielder Jahmai Jones, and optioned outfielder Nate Eaton to Worcester.
- July 17: The team recalled pitcher Alec Gamboa from Worcester, and Willson Contreras was activated from suspension. The team also activated outfielder Jahmai Jones.
- July 18: The team optioned pitcher Alec Gamboa to Worcester, and released pitcher Danny Coulombe.
- July 21: The team placed pitcher Zack Kelly on the 60-day injured list with right elbow inflammation, and recalled pitcher Alec Gamboa from Worcester.
- July 23: The team optioned pitcher Eduardo Rivera to Worcester.
- July 26: The team traded pitcher Connelly Early to the Washington Nationals for infielder Curtis Mead. The team also optioned pitcher Alec Gamboa to Worcester, and activated pitcher Ranger Suarez from the 15-day injured list.
- July 27: The team optioned shortstop Tsung-Che Cheng to Worcester, and activated infielder Curtis Mead.
- July 29: The team placed infielder Curtis Mead on the 10-day injured list retroactive to July 28 with a left wrist fracture, and recalled infielder Nick Sogard from Worcester.

August transactions

==== August ====
- August 3: The team traded Enddy Azócar, Anthony Eyanson, Carlos Narváez, Kyson Witherspoon and a player to be named later or cash considerations to the Baltimore Orioles in exchange for Adley Rutschman, Jake Rogers, and cash considerations. The team also traded Tyler Uberstine to the Atlanta Braves in exchange for Eli White, and Marcelo Mayer to the San Francisco Giants in exchange for Erik Miller and Carlos Gutierrez.
- August 4: The team optioned Romy Gonzalez to Worcester, designated Ryan Watson for assignment, and activated Eli White, Jake Rogers, and Erik Miller.
- August 7: The team optioned Greg Weissert to Worcester and selected the contract of Raymond Burgos.
- August 8: The team sent Adley Rutschman on rehab assignment to Worcester.
- August 9: The team optioned Raymond Burgos to Worcester and selected the contract of Seth Martinez.
- August 11: The team designated Jake Rogers for assignment, activated Adley Rutschman from the 10-day injured list, and transferred Isiah Kiner-Falefa from the 10-day injured list to the 60-day injured list.
- August 12: The team designated Seth Martinez for assignment and recalled Alec Gamboa from Worcester.
- August 13: The team recalled Greg Weissert from Worcester and placed Garrett Whitlock on the 15-day injured list retroactive to August 10 with right elbow inflammation.
- August 14: Jake Rogers was claimed off waivers by the Chicago White Sox, and Seth Martinez was sent outright to Worcester.
- August 16: The team recalled Raymond Burgos and Mickey Gasper from Worcester, sent Trevor Story on a rehab assignment to Worcester, placed Justin Slaten on the 15-day injured list retroactive to August 13 with right elbow inflammation, and placed Masataka Yoshida on the 10-day injured list with a left hamstring strain.
- August 17: The Team optioned Raymond Burgos to Worcester, selected the contract of Wyatt Olds from Worcester, and placed Eduardo Rivera on the Restricted List.
- August 18: The Team sent Roman Anthony on a rehab assignment to Portland.
- August 19: The team sent Isiah Kiner-Falefa on a rehab assignment to Worcester
- August 25: The team sent Roman Anthony on a rehab assignment to Worcester.
- August 28: The team signed free agent Tomas Nido to a minor league contract.
- August 29: The team optioned Wyatt Olds to Worcester, recalled Raymond Burgos from Worcester, and activated Garrett Whitlock from the 15-day injured list.
- August 30: The team optioned Raymond Burgos, Mickey Gasper, and Anthony Seigler to Worcester, and activated Trevor Story, and Roman Anthony from the 60-day injured list.
- August 31: The team recalled Mickey Gasper from Worcester, and placed Willson Contreras on the 10-day injured list with a left hamstring strain.

September Transactions

==== September ====
- September 1: The team recalled Wyatt Olds from Worcester, selected the contract of Jedixson Paez from Worcester, Recalled Eduardo Rivera from Worcester, and subsequently placed him on the 60-day injured list due to a lumbar strain. They also placed Tyron Guerrero on the 15-day Injured list due to shoulder inflammation, activated Isiah Kiner-Falefa from the 60-day injured list, and designated Brett Harris for assignment.
- September 2: The team recalled Raymond Burgos from Worcester, and optioned Jedixson Paez to Worcester.
- September 3: Brett Harris was claimed off waivers by the San Francisco Giants.
- September 6: The team placed Ceddanne Rafaela on the 10-day injured list retroactive to September 3 with a right quadriceps strain, and recalled Nate Eaton from Worcester.
- September 8: The team sent Tanner Houck on a rehab assignment to Portland.
- September 11: The team recalled Anthony Seigler from Worcester, Sent Willson Contreras on a rehab assignment to Portland, and placed Eli White on the 10-day injured list retroactive to September 3 with a right foot ligament injury
- September 13: The team placed Anthony Seigler on the 10-day injured list with right wrist inflammation, and activated Willson Contreras from the 10-day injured list.
- September 15: The team sent Tanner Houck on a rehab assignment to Worcester.
- September 17: The team sent Johan Oviedo on a rehab assignment to Worcester.
- September 20: The team optioned Wyatt Olds to Worcester, Activated Tyron Guerrero from the 15-day injured list.
- September 23: The team activated Ceddanne Rafaela from the 10-day injured list, and optioned Nate Eaton to Worcester.
- September 25: The team recalled Jedixson Paez from Worcester, and optioned Raymond Burgos to Worcester.
- September 27: The team recalled Nate Eaton and Wyatt Olds from Worcester, optioned Jedixson Paez to Worcester, Activated Tanner Houck from the 60-day injured list, transferred Eli White from the 10-day injured list to the 60-day injured list, placed Mickey Gasper on the 15-day injured list retroactive to Sep 26 with a right biceps strain, and placed Tyron Guerrero on the 15-day injured list with a right shoulder strain.

=== MLB debuts ===
- March 28: Ryan Watson
- April 5: Tyler Uberstine
- April 8: Tyler Samaniego
- April 14: Jack Anderson
- April 22: Eduardo Rivera
- May 1: Jake Bennett
- May 5: Alec Gamboa
- August 17: Wyatt Olds

== Season statistics ==
Red Sox batting team leaders
Batting
Batting average†	Ceddanne Rafaela	.282
Hits	Ceddanne Rafaela	153
Home runs	Willson Contreras	27
RBIs	Willson Contreras	81
Runs scored	Wilyer Abreu	81
Games played	Wilyer Abreu	157
Stolen bases	Jarren Duran	21
Triples	Jarren Duran	5

Red Sox pitching team leaders
Pitching
ERA‡	Sonny Gray	2.72
WHIP‡	Sonny Gray	1.15
Wins	Sonny Gray	18
Innings pitched	Sonny Gray	169
Games started	Sonny Gray	29
Strikeouts	Payton Tolle	171
Saves	Aroldis Chapman	35
Games pitched	Greg Weissert	63

Updated through September 27, 2026
† Minimum 3.1 plate appearances per team games played
AVG qualified batters: Abreu, Contreras, Duran, Durbin, Rafaela
‡ Minimum 1 inning pitched per team games played
ERA & WHIP qualified pitchers: Gray

=== Batting ===
Key to statistic abbreviations

- G — Games played
- AB — At bats
- R — Runs
- H — Hits
- 2B — Doubles
- 3B — Triples
- HR — Home runs
- RBI — Runs batted in
- BB — Walks
- SO — Strikeouts
- SB — Stolen bases
- AVG — Batting average †
- OBP — On-base percentage
- SLG — Slugging percentage
- OPS — On-base plus slugging

Statistics in bold are team leaders
† Minimum 3.1 plate appearances per team games played
* Traded midseason to the Red Sox
# Traded midseason away from the Red Sox

§ = Indicates league leader

2025 Batting statistics
Player	G	AB	R	H	2B	3B	HR	RBI	BB	SO	SB	AVG	OBP	SLG	OPS
Wilyer Abreu	**157**	**597**	**81**	148	**38**§	4	24	76	**71**	141	8	.248	.327	.446	.773
Roman Anthony	55	212	24	52	11	3	5	15	29	66	2	.245	.339	.396	.735
Tsung-Che Cheng	14	39	7	10	1	0	0	5	4	14	0	.256	.318	.282	.600
Willson Contreras	130	448	68	123	21	3	**27**	**81**	59	135	3	.275	**.386**	**.516**	**.901**
Jarren Duran	151	551	66	114	15	**5**	20	69	41	**165**	**21**	.207	.266	.361	.627
Caleb Durbin	153	508	74	126	25	1	13	64	51	79	20	.248	.332	.378	.710
Nate Eaton	24	50	4	8	2	0	1	6	8	16	2	.160	.300	.260	.560
Mickey Gasper	67	191	26	48	9	1	10	24	27	39	0	.251	.357	.466	.823
Romy González	19	65	7	12	3	1	1	7	5	21	1	.185	.264	.308	.572
Brett Harris*	1	2	0	0	0	0	0	0	0	0	0	.000	.333	.000	.333
Jahmai Jones*	37	65	13	20	4	1	4	9	7	23	3	.308	.408	.585	.993
Isiah Kiner-Falefa	66	161	23	39	5	0	2	16	19	27	8	.242	.322	.311	.633
Marcelo Mayer#	70	205	19	45	10	0	3	22	16	44	3	.220	.282	.312	.594
Curtis Mead*	1	1	0	0	0	0	0	0	0	0	1	.000	.500	.000	.500
Andruw Monasterio	107	313	35	73	23	1	6	43	26	68	4	.233	.295	.371	.665
Carlos Narváez#	62	171	17	32	6	0	3	10	14	66	1	.187	.260	.275	.535
Ceddanne Rafaela	138	541	67	**153**	32	3	16	70	22	117	17	**.283**	.319	.442	.761
Jake Rogers*	3	6	4	3	2	0	0	2	2	2	0	.500	.556	.833	1.389
Adley Rutschman*	32	117	14	26	7	0	5	13	9	28	0	.222	.278	.410	.688
Anthony Seigler	49	150	21	37	12	1	3	13	18	28	2	.247	.327	.400	.727
Nick Sogard	66	239	29	61	14	1	5	19	31	56	1	.255	.342	.385	.727
Trevor Story	64	251	24	59	14	0	5	29	11	86	5	.235	.271	.351	.621
Eli White*	27	58	10	16	3	0	1	12	2	14	1	.276	.300	.379	.679
Connor Wong	77	210	22	49	12	0	4	25	17	57	3	.233	.308	.348	.655
Masataka Yoshida	87	263	34	72	16	1	5	28	28	33	2	.274	.347	.399	.746
**Totals**	**162**	**5414**	**689**	**1326**	**285**	**26**	**163**	**658**	**517**	**1326**	**107**	**.245**	**.319**	**.397**	**.717**

Updated through September 27, 2026

=== Pitching ===
Key to statistic abbreviations

- GP — Games pitched
- GS — Games started
- W — Wins
- L — Losses
- SV — Saves
- HLD — Holds
- IP — Innings pitched
- H — Hits allowed
- R — Runs allowed
- ER — Earned Runs allowed
- HR — Home runs allowed
- BB — Walks allowed
- K — Strikeouts
- ERA — ERA †
- WHIP — WHIP

Statistics in bold are team leaders
† Minimum 1 inning pitched per team games played
* Traded midseason to the Red Sox
# Traded midseason away from the Red Sox
‡ Normally a position player

§ = Indicates league leader

2025 Batting statistics
Pitcher	GP	GS	W	L	SV	HLD	IP	H	R	ER	HR	BB	K	ERA	WHIP
Jack Anderson	3	0	0	0	0	0	8.0	8	3	3	1	2	6	3.38	1.25
Brayan Bello	26	11	6	**7**	1	0	116.1	123	**61**	**56**	12	36	92	4.33	1.37
Jake Bennett	20	19	9	**7**	0	0	113.1	104	47	46	12	21	91	3.65	1.10
Raymond Burgos	9	0	0	0	2	0	21.1	17	11	10	3	1	16	4.22	0.84
Aroldis Chapman	53	0	3	4	**35**	0	51.2	35	13	11	3	23	71	1.92	1.12
Danny Coulombe	29	0	0	2	0	7	22.0	18	11	11	1	15	10	4.50	1.50
Garrett Crochet	6	6	3	3	0	0	30.0	33	23	21	5	11	37	6.30	1.47
Connelly Early#	17	17	7	5	0	0	91.2	81	35	35	15	34	93	3.44	1.25
Alec Gamboa	21	3	1	0	1	2	33.0	27	8	7	1	11	23	1.91	1.15
Sonny Gray	29	**29**	**18**§	5	0	0	**169.0**	**148**	52	51	**16**	**46**	149	**2.72**	**1.15**
Tyron Guerrero	40	0	1	2	0	19	40.2	37	18	14	2	8	41	3.10	1.11
Tanner Houck	1	1	0	1	0	0	3.0	4	3	3	2	0	1	9.00	1.333
Tommy Kahnle	8	0	0	0	0	0	9.0	12	8	8	2	6	5	8.00	2.00
Zack Kelly	17	0	0	2	0	3	16.1	14	8	6	1	7	14	3.31	1.29
Joe La Sorsa	1	0	0	0	0	0	0.1	1	1	1	1	0	1	27.00	3.00
Seth Martinez	1	0	0	0	0	0	1.0	2	1	1	0	0	1	9.00	2.00
Erik Miller*	19	1	2	2	1	4	18.2	14	8	7	1	12	29	3.38	1.39
Andruw Monasterio‡	1	0	0	0	0	0	0.2	3	5	5	2	3	0	67.50	9.00
Jovani Morán	50	3	2	3	0	5	65.2	42	24	23	9	33	73	3.15	1.14
Wyatt Olds	14	0	2	0	0	1	15.2	11	5	2	2	8	20	1.15	1.21
Johan Oviedo	1	0	0	0	0	0	3.2	6	4	4	2	1	3	9.82	1.91
Jedixson Páez	2	1	1	1	0	0	8.2	13	8	8	2	2	8	8.31	1.73
Eduardo Rivera	4	3	0	1	0	0	10.0	8	7	7	1	6	10	6.30	1.40
Tyler Samaniego	20	1	0	3	0	1	20.1	22	8	6	1	8	17	2.66	1.48
Patrick Sandoval	15	13	1	7	0	0	70.1	86	44	40	7	32	73	5.12	1.68
Justin Slaten	36	0	2	4	0	17	31.1	35	20	16	4	8	39	4.60	1.37
Ranger Suarez	28	28	8	5	0	0	148.1	130	56	53	10	**46**	140	3.22	1.19
Payton Tolle	26	26	9	6	0	0	148.2	123	54	50	15	40	**171**	3.03	1.10
Tyler Uberstine	1	0	0	1	0	0	2.2	3	1	1	1	1	2	3.38	1.50
Ryan Watson	35	0	1	0	1	1	55.2	54	28	28	8	19	43	4.53	1.31
Greg Weissert	**63**	0	4	2	1	8	60.2	55	23	22	8	20	60	3.26	1.24
Garrett Whitlock	54	0	7	2	4	**26**	52.1	38	13	10	3	9	59	1.72	0.90
**Totals**	**162**	**162**	**87**	**75**	**46**	**94**	**1440.0**	**1307**	**611**	**566**	**153**	**469**	**1398**	**3.54**	**1.233**

Updated through September 27, 2026

== Awards and honors ==
Recipient	Award	Date awarded	Ref.
Willson Contreras	AL Player of the Week	May 26, 2026	
Ranger Suárez (Note: Ranger Suárez was replaced on the American League roster by Nick Martinez due to injury.)	All-Star Team	July 4, 2026	
Aroldis Chapman	All-Star Team	July 4, 2026	
Willson Contreras (Note: Willson Contreras was added to the American League roster as an injury replacement for Vladimir Guerrero Jr.)	All-Star Team	July 7, 2026	
Ceddanne Rafaela (Note: Ceddanne Rafaela was added to the American League roster as an injury replacement for Aaron Judge.)	All-Star Team	July 10, 2026	
Wilyer Abreu	AL Player of the Week	July 20, 2026	
Ceddanne Rafaela	AL Player of the Week	August 3, 2026	
Aroldis Chapman	AL Reliever of the Month	August 3, 2026	
Wilyer Abreu	AL Player of the Week	August 10, 2026	
Ceddanne Rafaela	Fielding Bible Award (CF)	October 22, 2026	
Wilyer Abreu	Fielding Bible Award (RF)	October 22, 2026	
Ceddanne Rafaela	AL Gold Glove Award (CF)	November 1, 2026	
Wilyer Abreu	AL Gold Glove Award (RF)	November 1, 2026	
Caleb Durbin	AL Gold Glove Award (3B)	November 1, 2026	

Chad Tracy was named a finalist for AL Manager of the Year and Payton Tolle was named a finalist for AL Rookie of the Year.

== Farm system ==
Coaching assignments in the Red Sox' farm system were announced on January 16.

Level	Team	League	Division	Manager	Record	Notes
Triple-A	Worcester Red Sox	International League	East	Chad Tracy	76–67 (.531)	Iggy Suarez acting manager (April 26 – end of season)
Double-A	Portland Sea Dogs	Eastern League	Northeast	Chad Epperson	71–65 (.522)	Kyle Sasala acting manager (April 26 – end of season)
High-A	Greenville Drive	South Atlantic League	South	Liam Carroll	59–70 (.457)	
Single-A	Salem RidgeYaks	Carolina League	North	Ozzie Chavez	56–75 (.427)	
Rookie	FCL Red Sox	Florida Complex League	South	Chase Illig	23–33 (.411)	
Rookie	DSL Red Sox Blue	Dominican; Summer League	North	Sandy Madera	20–33 (.377)	
Rookie	DSL Red Sox Red	Dominican; Summer League	Northwest	Amaury Garcia	17–37 (.315)	

== Amateur draft ==
The 2026 MLB draft was held on July 11–12, 2026, in Philadelphia, Pennsylvania, site of the season's All-Star Game.

The Red Sox acquired a Competitive Balance Round B pick (between the second and third rounds) as part of the offseason trade with the Milwaukee Brewers for Caleb Durbin, Andruw Monasterio and Anthony Seigler.

Round	Pick	Name	Position†	School (state)	Birthplace	Signing date	Ref.
1	20	Jake Schaffner	SS	North Carolina (NC)	USA	July 17	
Comp. Bal. B	67	Owen Hull	OF	North Carolina (NC)	USA	July 17	
3	96	Jace Mataczynski	SS	Hudson HS (WI)	USA	July 17	
5	156	Lucas Davenport	RHP	Baylor (TX)	USA	July 17	
6	185	Brett Lanman	LHP	Abilene Christian (TX)	USA	July 17	
7	214	Kide Adetuyi	LHP	Florida Atlantic (FL)	USA	July 17	
8	244	Josh Volmerding	LHP	Cal Poly (CA)	USA	July 17	
9	274	Martin Shelar	OF	Marist School (GA)	USA	July 17	
10	304	Kaleb LeFavor	RHP	Bishop Heelan HS (IA)	USA	July 17	
11	334	Wills Maginnis	SS	Georgia State (GA)	USA	July 17	
12	364	Jacob Webster	SS	Oak Hills HS (CA)	USA	July 17	
13	394	Mason Lei	RHP	Illinois-Chicago (IL)	USA	July 17	
14	424	Jase Evangelista	RHP	Nevada-Las Vegas (NV)	USA	July 17	
15	454	Chase Frey	LHP	Grand Canyon (AZ)	USA	DNS	
16	484	Colton Coates	SS	Louisiana Tech (LA)	USA	July 17	
17	514	Alex Kranzler	RHP	Vanderbilt (TN)	USA	July 17	
18	544	Ethan Offing	OF	Dutch Fork HS (SC)	USA	DNS	
19	574	Luis Calderon	RHP	El Shaddai Christian HS (PR)	PR	July 17	
20	604	Aiden VanDeHatert	LHP	Dallas Baptist (TX)	USA	July 18	

† Positions are per MLB Draft Tracker.
