= Chad Epperson =

American baseball coach (born 1972)

Boston Red Sox – No. 81
- Coach
- Born: March 26, 1972 (age 54); Elizabethtown, Kentucky, U.S.
- Bats: Left Throws: Right

Teams
- Boston Red Sox (2026)

Chad Aaron Epperson (born March 26, 1972) is an American professional baseball coach, and a former minor-league player, instructor and managerwho is currently the manager for the Worcester Red Sox, the Triple-A affiliate of the Boston Red Sox of Major League Baseball (MLB).

Epperson served as the manager of the Red Sox Double-A affiliate, the Portland Sea Dogs since 2022, before being named the acting third-base coach of the Boston Red Sox for the 2026 season after multiple coaching changes following a 10–17 start.

== Career ==
During his playing career, Epperson was a catcher who batted left-handed, threw right-handed, stood 6 feet 3 inches (1.91 m) tall and weighed 215 pounds (98 kg).

A 1990 graduate of Bishop Verot High School in Fort Myers, Florida, Epperson attended Seminole Community College and was selected by the New York Mets in the 40th round of the 1992 MLB draft. His professional playing career extended through 2000, and included stints in the Mets (1992–1995), Red Sox (1997–1999) and Baltimore Orioles (2000) farm systems, as well as service in independent league baseball.

Epperson reached the Double-A level for three Eastern League teams, the Binghamton Mets, Trenton Thunder and Bowie Baysox. In 2002, after a year as a manager in the independent Frontier League, Epperson rejoined the Red Sox organization as batting coach of the Sarasota Red Sox of the Class A Florida State League.

After two years in that role, Epperson became a manager in the Red Sox system with the Class A Augusta Greenjackets (2004), Greenville Bombers (2005), Wilmington Blue Rocks (2006), Lancaster JetHawks (2007–2008), and Salem Red Sox (2009). He was the California League Manager of the Year in successive seasons during his two years with Lancaster. His managerial record as of his promotion to the MLB Red Sox was 798–766 (.510) over 13 seasons.

On April 25, 2026, he was reassigned from his role as manager of the Portland Sea Dogs of the Double-A Eastern League to acting third-base coach of the Boston Red Sox of Major League Baseball (MLB).

Epperson lives in Andover, Massachusetts.

Preceded by Kyle Hudson	Boston Red Sox third-base coach 2026 (Interim)	Succeeded by Vacant
