= Nate Eaton =

American baseball player (born 1996)

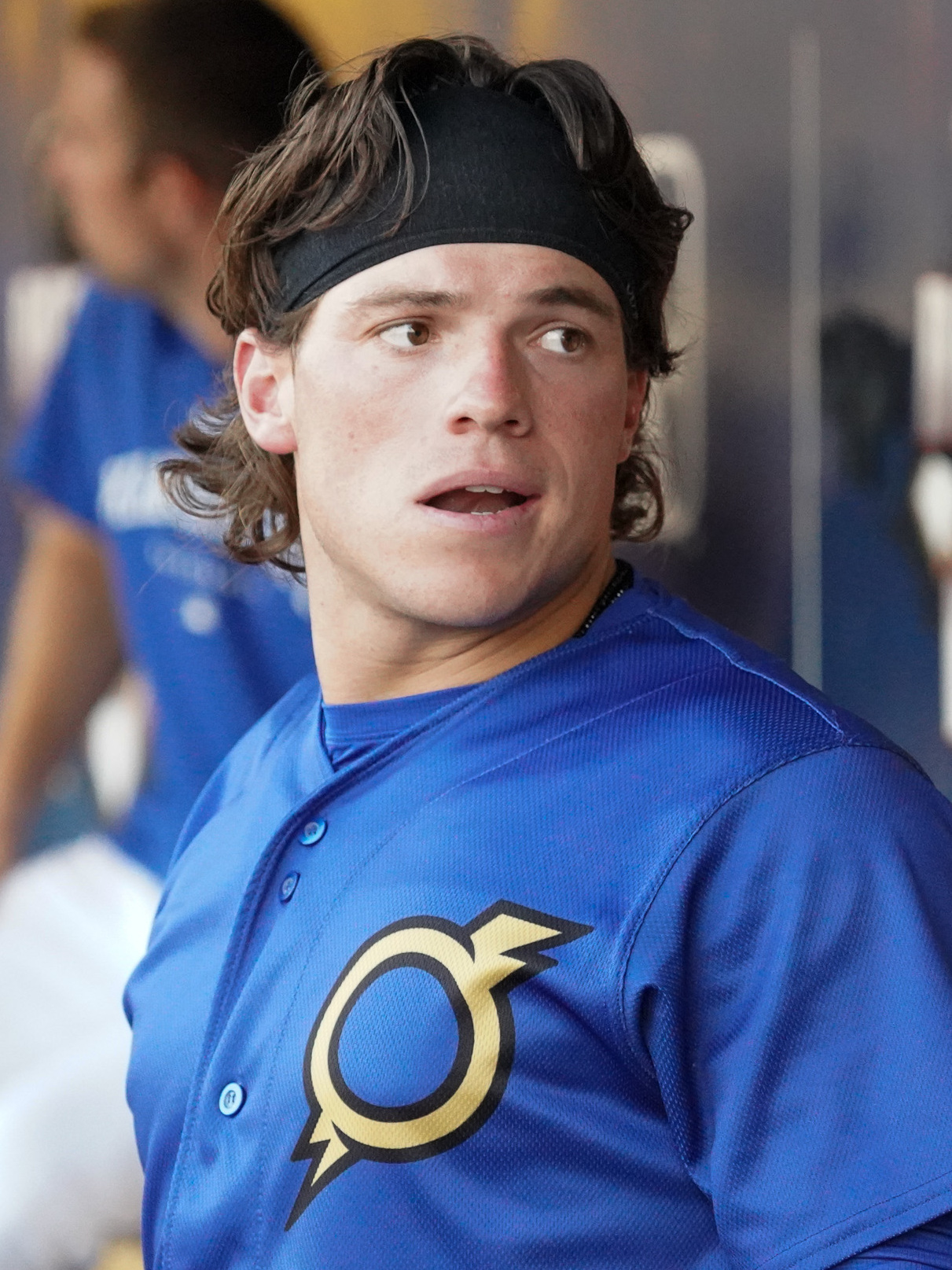
- Eaton with the Omaha Storm Chasers in 2023

Athletics – No. 98
- Outfielder / Third baseman
- Born: December 22, 1996 (age 29); Chester, Virginia, U.S.
- Bats: Right Throws: Right

MLB debut
- July 14, 2022, for the Kansas City Royals

MLB statistics (through 2026 season)
- Batting average: .221
- Home runs: 3
- Runs batted in: 23
- Stats at Baseball Reference

Teams
- Kansas City Royals (2022–2023); Boston Red Sox (2025–2026)

Nathan Wyatt Eaton (born December 22, 1996) is an American professional baseball outfielder and third baseman for the Athletics of Major League Baseball (MLB). He has previously played in MLB for the Kansas City Royals and Boston Red Sox. He played college baseball at the Virginia Military Institute, and was drafted by the Royals in the 21st round of the 2018 MLB draft, and made his MLB debut with them in 2022. He played for the Great Britain national baseball team at the 2026 World Baseball Classic.

== Career ==
=== Kansas City Royals ===
Eaton attended Thomas Dale High School in Chester, Virginia, and played college baseball at the Virginia Military Institute. In 2018, he posted a .287/.402/.507 slash line while leading the Southern Conference with 36 steals and being caught five times. He was drafted by the Kansas City Royals in the 21st round of the 2018 Major League Baseball draft. He made his professional debut with the Idaho Falls Chukars and played in 2019 with the Lexington Legends, slashing .233/.305/.336 in 497 at bats and stealing 18 bases in 19 attempts.

Eaton did not play for a team in 2020 due to the Minor League Baseball season being cancelled because of the COVID-19 pandemic. He played 2021 with the Arizona Complex League Royals and Quad Cities River Bandits, and for three minor league teams that season slashed .243/.350/.368 in 272 at bats with 23 stolen bases in 26 attempts. After the season, he played in the Arizona Fall League and was selected to play in the Fall Stars Game.

Eaton started 2022 with Northwest Arkansas Naturals before being promoted to the Omaha Storm Chasers, and in 2022 between the two teams he slashed .285/.358/.465 in 388 at bats with 23 stolen bases in 28 attempts.

The Royals promoted Eaton to the major leagues for the first time on July 14, 2022. That same day, Eaton logged his first career hit, a solo home run off of Anthony Banda. The blast helped fuel the Royals to a 3-1 victory over the Toronto Blue Jays. He was removed from the 40-man roster and returned to the minors on July 18. He had his contract selected back to the major league roster on August 3. In 2022 with the Royals, he slashed .264/.331/.387 in 106 at bats with 11 steals in 12 attempts.

Eaton made Kansas City's Opening Day roster to start the 2023 season. Eaton pitched in a game against the Texas Rangers on April 10, 2023. He pitched a scoreless ninth inning, hitting 94 mph (151 km/h) with his fastball and striking out Adolis García. Eaton struggled for Kansas City in 2023, playing in 28 games and slashing just .075/.125/.075 with no home runs, one RBI, and three stolen bases. On November 2, Eaton was designated for assignment by the Royals. He cleared waivers and was sent outright to Triple–A Omaha on November 8.

Eaton spent the 2024 campaign with Triple–A Omaha, playing in 116 games and slashing .252/.299/.439 with 16 home runs, 60 RBI, and 27 stolen bases. Eaton elected free agency on November 6, 2024.

=== Boston Red Sox ===
On November 20, 2024, Eaton signed a minor-league contract with the Boston Red Sox. He was assigned to the Triple-A Worcester Red Sox to begin the 2025 season. On June 1, the Red Sox selected Eaton's contract and added him to their active roster; he was optioned back to Triple-A the following day, then recalled on June 16. After being optioned to Triple-A on July 9, he was again recalled on August 18.

Eaton was again optioned to Triple-A Worcester to begin the 2026 season. He made 24 appearances for Boston during the regular season, batting .160/.300/.260 with one home run, six RBI, and two stolen bases.

=== Athletics ===
On October 28, 2026, Eaton was traded to the Athletics in exchange for Jareth Rayo.

== International career ==
Eaton was on the Great Britain team during the 2026 World Baseball Classic. He had all three of Britain's hits in a 9–1 defeat to Team USA, including a first-pitch home run off reigning AL Cy Young Award Winner Tarik Skubal, and finished the tournament with a batting average of .316 across the four games Britain played.
