= Brett Harris =

American baseball player (born 1998)

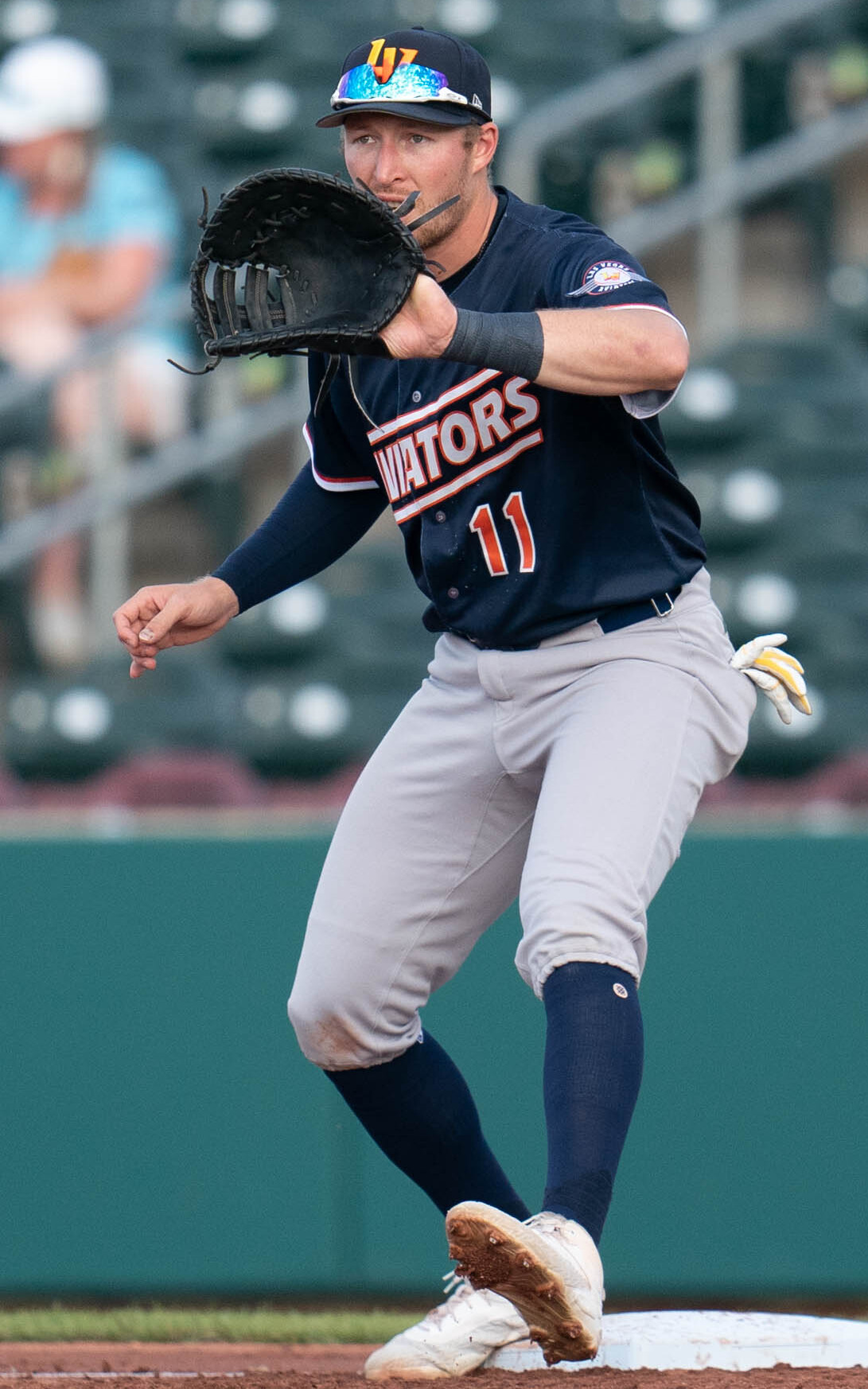
- Harris with the Las Vegas Aviators in 2026

Free agent
- Third baseman
- Born: June 24, 1998 (age 28); Arlington Heights, Illinois, U.S.
- Bats: Right Throws: Right

MLB debut
- May 3, 2024, for the Oakland Athletics

MLB statistics (through 2026 season)
- Batting average: .186
- Home runs: 3
- Runs batted in: 19
- Stats at Baseball Reference

Teams
- Oakland Athletics / Athletics (2024–2026); Boston Red Sox (2026); San Francisco Giants (2026)

Brett Steven Harris (born June 24, 1998) is an American professional baseball third baseman who is a free agent. He has previously played in Major League Baseball (MLB) for the Oakland Athletics / Athletics, Boston Red Sox, and San Francisco Giants. He made his MLB debut in 2024.

== Amateur career ==
Harris attended John Hersey High School in Arlington Heights, Illinois, where played baseball and graduated from in 2016. He enrolled at the University of Houston to play college baseball for the Houston Cougars, but did not appear in a game, and transferred to Central Arizona College for the 2018 season. He then transferred to Gonzaga University, where he played three years of college baseball for the Gonzaga Bulldogs, batting .355 with six home runs during his senior season in 2021. He was also named the West Coast Conference Defensive Player of the Year.

In 2020, Harris played summer league baseball with the K-Town Bobbers of the Northwoods League.

== Professional career ==
=== Oakland Athletics / Athletics ===
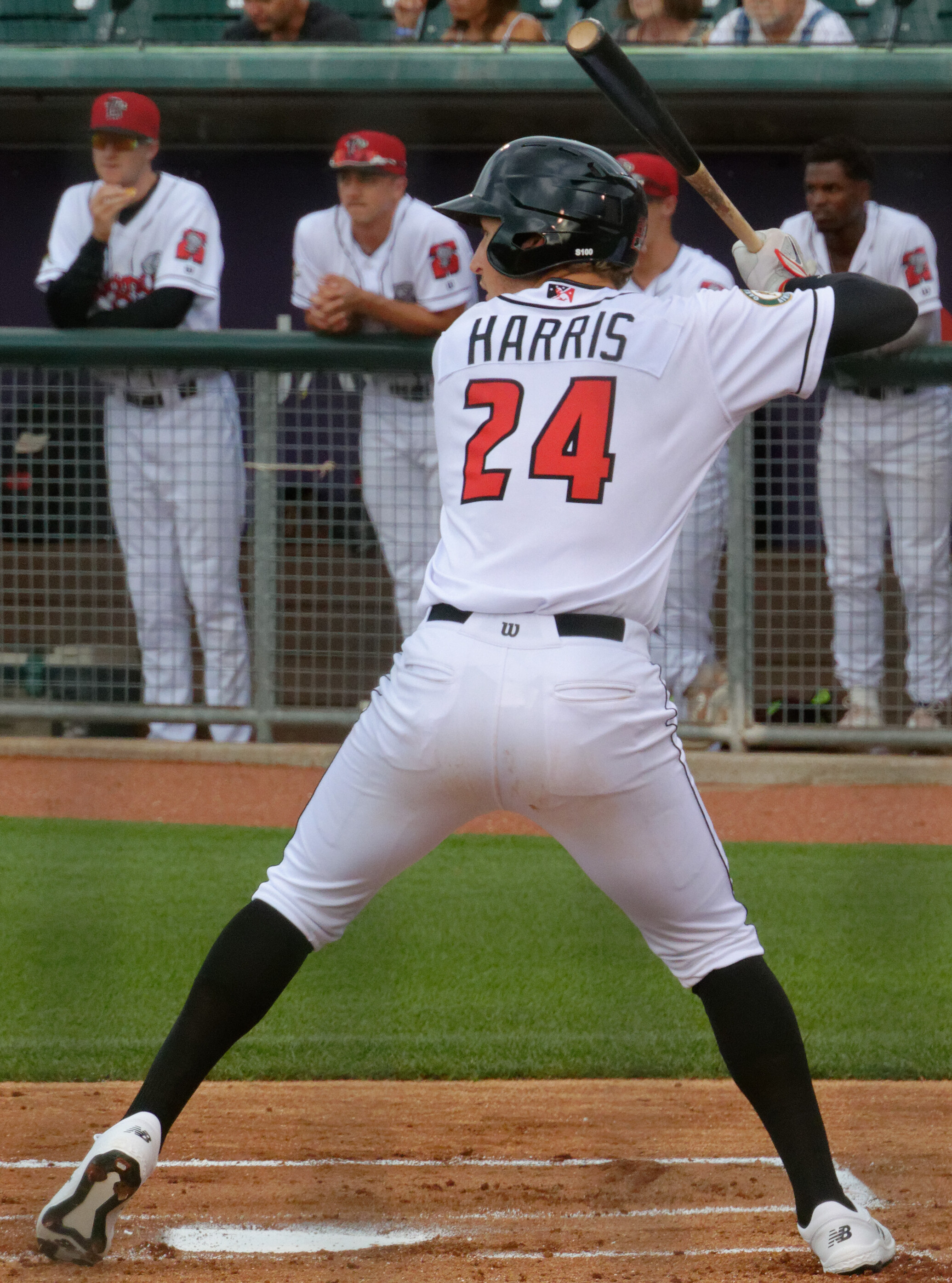
Harris with the Lansing Lugnuts in 2021

The Oakland Athletics selected Harris in the seventh round of the 2021 Major League Baseball draft. He signed with the team and made his professional debut with the Arizona Complex League Athletics and was promoted to the Lansing Lugnuts during the season. Over 27 games between both teams, he batted .238 with three home runs. He opened the 2022 season with Lansing and was promoted to the Midland RockHounds in late May. Over 113 games between the two teams, he slashed .290/.374/.475 with 17 home runs, 63 RBI, and 11 stolen bases. To open the 2023 season, he was assigned to Midland. In mid-July, he was promoted to the Las Vegas Aviators. Over 105 games, he batted .279 with nine home runs and 62 RBI. He was selected to play in the Arizona Fall League with the Mesa Solar Sox. Harris was assigned to Las Vegas to open the 2024 season.

On May 3, 2024, Harris was promoted to the major leagues for the first time. Over 36 games for the Athletics, he hit .146 with three home runs and 12 RBI. Harris recorded the first two hits and first two home runs off of Darren McCaughan on May 4 in a 20-4 win over the Miami Marlins. Harris opened the 2025 season on the injured list with an oblique injury and then optioned to Las Vegas.

Harris was again optioned to Triple-A Las Vegas to begin the 2026 season. He made five appearances for the Athletics, going 0-for-6 with one walk. Harris was designated for assignment by the Athletics on June 27, 2026.

=== Boston Red Sox ===
On July 1, 2026, Harris was traded to the Boston Red Sox in exchange for Ben Hansen. He made one appearance for the Red Sox, going 0–for–2 in a 2–1 victory over the Chicago White Sox on July 9. Harris was designated for assignment by Boston on September 1.

=== San Francisco Giants ===
On September 3, 2026, Harris was claimed off waivers by the San Francisco Giants. He appeared in 15 games for the Giants and batted .158 with two RBI and two doubles.

=== Philadelphia Phillies ===
On November 2, 2026, Harris was claimed off of waivers by the Philadelphia Phillies. On November 20, he was non-tendered by the Phillies and became a free agent.
