= Tyler Samaniego =

American baseball player (born 1999)

Boston Red Sox – No. 78
- Pitcher
- Born: January 30, 1999 (age 27); Huntsville, Alabama, U.S.
- Bats: Right Throws: Left

MLB debut
- April 8, 2026, for the Boston Red Sox

MLB statistics (through 2026 season)
- Win–loss record: 0–3
- Earned run average: 2.66
- Strikeouts: 17
- Stats at Baseball Reference

Teams
- Boston Red Sox (2026–present)

Robert Tyler Samaniego (born January 30, 1999) is an American professional baseball pitcher for the Boston Red Sox of Major League Baseball (MLB). He made his MLB debut in 2026.

== Career ==
=== Pittsburgh Pirates ===
Samaniego played college baseball at the University of South Alabama, making 23 relief appearances over two seasons. He was selected by the Pittsburgh Pirates in the 15th round (433rd overall) of the 2021 Major League Baseball draft. He made five relief appearances for the Single-A Bradenton Marauders during the 2021 season.

During the 2022 season, Samaniego pitched for the High-A Greensboro Grasshoppers and the Double-A Altoona Curve. In 38 total appearances, all in relief, he compiled a 4–4 win–loss record and 2.45 earned run average (ERA) in 47 2/3 innings pitched. He returned to Altoona for the 2023 season; in 41 appearances (one start) he posted a 3–3 record and 3.52 ERA in 30 2/3 innings pitched. After the regular season, he pitched for the Salt River Rafters in the Arizona Fall League. Again with Altoona for the 2024 season, he made 13 appearances, all in relief, and had a 3.57 ERA with no decisions in 17 2/3 innings pitched. He missed the second half of the season due to surgery (an internal brace procedure).

Samaniego split the 2025 season between the Bradenton Marauders, Greensboro Grasshoppers, Altoona Curve, and rookie-level Florida Complex League Pirates; in 30 appearances for the four affiliates, he compiled a 3–3 record and 3.99 ERA with 44 strikeouts and three saves across 38 1/3 innings pitched. On November 18, 2025, the Pirates added Samaniego to their 40-man roster to protect him from the Rule 5 draft.

=== Boston Red Sox ===
On December 4, 2025, the Pirates traded Samaniego, Johan Oviedo, and Adonys Guzman to the Boston Red Sox in exchange for Jhostynxon García and Jesus Travieso. Samaniego was optioned to the Triple-A Worcester Red Sox to begin the 2026 season. On April 8, 2026, Samaniego was promoted to the major leagues for the first time following an injury to Justin Slaten. Samaniego made his major-league debut that day at Fenway Park in a game against the Milwaukee Brewers; he pitched one inning, giving up one walk while recording three strikeouts. He became the first Red Sox pitcher to record his first three major-league outs via strikeout since Don Aase in 1977.
