= Jedixson Páez =

Venezuelan baseball player (born 2004)

Boston Red Sox – No. 65
- Pitcher
- Born: January 17, 2004 (age 22); Tinaquillo, Venezuela
- Bats: Right Throws: Right

MLB debut
- March 26, 2026, for the Chicago White Sox

MLB statistics (through 2026 season)
- Win–loss record: 1–1
- Earned run average: 10.80
- Strikeouts: 8
- Stats at Baseball Reference

Teams
- Chicago White Sox (2026); Boston Red Sox (2026–present)

Jedixson Jose Páez (born January 17, 2004) is a Venezuelan professional baseball pitcher for the Boston Red Sox of Major League Baseball (MLB). He made his MLB debut in 2026 for the Chicago White Sox as a Rule 5 selection, but was returned to Boston after three appearances.

== Career ==
=== Boston Red Sox ===
The Boston Red Sox signed Páez as an international free agent on January 15, 2021 for a $450,000 signing bonus. He made his professional debut with the Dominican Summer League Red Sox. Páez pitched for the Salem Red Sox and Greenville Drive in 2024 and for Greenville in 2025.

=== Chicago White Sox ===
On December 10, 2025, the Chicago White Sox selected Páez from the Red Sox in the Rule 5 draft. On March 24, 2026, the White Sox announced that Paez had made the team's Opening Day roster. He made his MLB debut with Chicago on Opening Day, allowing three runs on two hits in 1 1/3 innings pitched against the Milwaukee Brewers. In three appearances for Chicago, Paez struggled to an 18.00 ERA with no strikeouts across three innings of work. On April 1, Paez was designated for assignment by the White Sox.

=== Boston Red Sox (second stint) ===
On April 4, 2026, the White Sox returned Páez to the Boston Red Sox organization, where he was assigned to the Double-A Portland Sea Dogs. He made 20 appearances (including 10 starts) split between Portland and the Triple–A Worcester Red Sox, accumulating a 2–4 record and 4.11 ERA with 74 strikeouts and three saves across 61 1/3 innings pitched. On September 1, the Red Sox selected Páez's contract, adding him to their active roster.

== See also ==
- Rule 5 draft results
