= Raymond Burgos =

Puerto Rican baseball player (born 1998)

- Burgos with the Worcester Red Sox in 2026

Athletics
- Pitcher
- Born: November 29, 1998 (age 27); Río Grande, Puerto Rico
- Bats: Left Throws: Left

MLB debut
- June 24, 2024, for the San Francisco Giants

MLB statistics (through 2026 season)
- Win–loss record: 0–0
- Earned run average: 4.43
- Strikeouts: 17
- Stats at Baseball Reference

Teams
- San Francisco Giants (2024); Boston Red Sox (2026)

Raymond Burgos (born November 29, 1998) is a Puerto Rican professional baseball pitcher for the Athletics of Major League Baseball (MLB). He has previously played in MLB for the San Francisco Giants and Boston Red Sox.

== Career ==
=== Cleveland Indians / Guardians ===
Burgos was drafted by the Cleveland Indians in the 18th round, with the 542nd overall selection, of the 2016 Major League Baseball draft. He underwent Tommy John surgery following the draft, and missed the entirety of the 2016 and 2017 seasons as a result.

Burgos made his professional debut in 2018, splitting the year between the rookie–level Arizona League Indians and Low–A Mahoning Valley Scrappers. In 13 games (9 starts) overall, he logged a 3.41 ERA with 67 strikeouts. Burgos began the 2019 season with the Single–A Lake County Captains, logging a 3.44 ERA in 8 starts before he suffered a season–ending triceps injury in May. He did not play in a game in 2020 due to the cancellation of the minor league season because of the COVID-19 pandemic.

Burgos returned to action in 2021, pitching in 6 games split between the rookie–level Arizona Complex League Indians and Lake County. He returned to Lake County in 2022, making 37 appearances out of the bullpen and accumulating an 8–3 record and 2.08 ERA with 67 strikeouts across 65 innings pitched. Burgos elected free agency following the season on November 10, 2022.

=== San Francisco Giants ===
On December 12, 2022, Burgos signed a minor league contract with the San Francisco Giants organization. He split the 2023 campaign between the Double–A Richmond Flying Squirrels and Triple–A Sacramento River Cats. In 37 appearances split between the two affiliates, Burgos compiled a 3.38 ERA with 54 strikeouts and 2 saves across 58 2/3 innings. He elected free agency following the season on November 6, 2023.

=== Guerreros de Oaxaca ===
On April 11, 2024, Burgos signed with the Guerreros de Oaxaca of the Mexican League. He made one appearances for the Guerreros, recording one scoreless inning of relief. Burgos was released by Oaxaca on April 15.

=== San Francisco Giants (second stint) ===
On April 18, 2024, Burgos signed a minor league contract with the San Francisco Giants. On June 24, Burgos was selected to the 40-man roster and promoted to the major leagues for the first time. He made his MLB debut that day against the Chicago Cubs, recording an inning of one–run ball with one strikeout and one walk. Burgos was designated for assignment following the promotion of Hayden Birdsong on June 26. He cleared waivers and was sent outright to the Triple–A Sacramento River Cats on July 1. Burgos elected free agency following the season on November 4.

On December 14, 2024, Burgos re–signed with the Giants on a minor league contract. In 26 appearances split between Sacramento and the Double-A Richmond Flying Squirrels, he posted a combined 1-2 record and 6.68 ERA with 34 strikeouts and one save across 32 1/3 innings pitched. Burgos was released by the Giants organization on August 4, 2025.

=== Guerreros de Oaxaca (second stint) ===
On December 12, 2025, Burgos signed with the Guerreros de Oaxaca of the Mexican League. Burgos made three starts for Oaxaca, recording a 5.25 ERA with eight strikeouts over 12 innings of work.

=== Boston Red Sox ===
On May 7, 2026, Burgos signed a minor league contract with the Boston Red Sox. He made 15 appearances (including 14 starts) for the Triple–A Worcester Red Sox, registering a 3–6 record and 5.63 ERA with 52 strikeouts over 64 innings of work. On August 7, Burgos was called up to the majors and earned his first career save by pitching three innings of relief against the Athletics. He made nine appearances for Boston, recording 4.22 ERA with 16 strikeouts and two saves across 21 1/3 innings pitched.

=== Athletics ===
On November 17, 2026, Burgos was traded to the Athletics in exchange for Kenya Huggins.
