= Romy González =

American baseball player (born 1996)

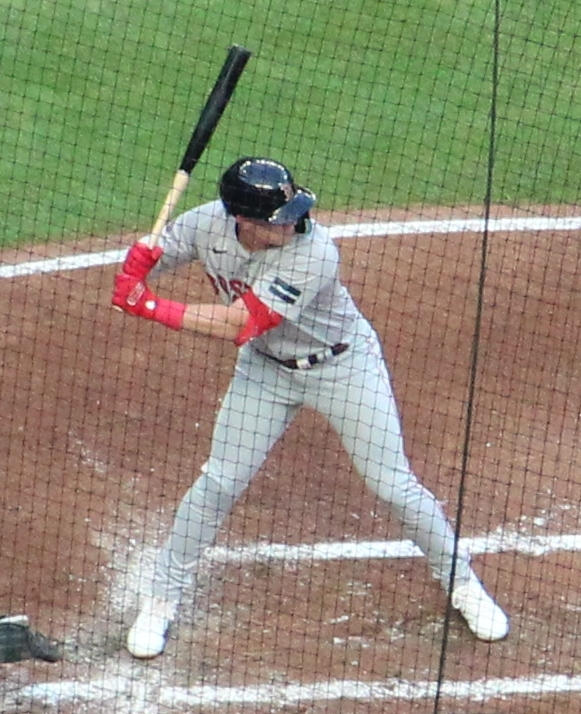
- González with the Boston Red Sox in 2024

Boston Red Sox – No. 23
- Utility player
- Born: September 6, 1996 (age 30); Miami, Florida, U.S.
- Bats: Right Throws: Right

MLB debut
- September 3, 2021, for the Chicago White Sox

Career statistics (through 2026 season)
- Batting average: .262
- Home runs: 21
- Runs batted in: 116
- Stats at Baseball Reference

Teams
- Chicago White Sox (2021–2023); Boston Red Sox (2024–present)

Roman Alexander González (born September 6, 1996) is an American professional baseball utility player for the Boston Red Sox of Major League Baseball (MLB). He has previously played in MLB for the Chicago White Sox.

== Amateur career ==
González attended American Senior High School. He enrolled at the University of Miami, and played college baseball for the Miami Hurricanes. In 2017, he played collegiate summer baseball with the Orleans Firebirds of the Cape Cod Baseball League, was named a league all-star, and was nick-named "Gonzo" for his wild, off-the-field antics.

== Professional career ==
=== Chicago White Sox ===
The Chicago White Sox of Major League Baseball (MLB) selected González in the 18th round, with the 528th selection, of the 2018 MLB draft, In 2018 with the rookie–level Great Falls Voyagers González batted .254 with 10 home runs and 33 runs batted in (RBIs) in 54 games. In 2019, he went to the Single–A Kannapolis Intimidators. In 101 games, he batted .244 with four home runs and 45 RBIs. González did not play in a game in 2020 due to the cancellation of the minor league season because of the COVID-19 pandemic. In 2021, he played for both the Double–A Birmingham Barons and Triple–A Charlotte Knights. In 87 games combined, he batted .275 with 23 home runs and 57 RBI with 22 stolen bases while being caught only six times.

On September 1, 2021, González was promoted to the major leagues. He made his MLB debut on September 3 as a pinch hitter, going 0-for-2 against the Kansas City Royals. On September 8, he got his first hit, a pinch-hit single off Oakland Athletics pitcher Andrew Chafin. He finished his rookie campaign playing in 10 games and going 8–for–32 (.250) with 2 RBI.

On September 3, 2022, González hit his first career home run, a three–run shot off of Minnesota Twins starter Aaron Sanchez.

González hit .194 in 44 games for Chicago in 2023 before he was placed on the injured list with right shoulder inflammation on June 19, 2023. He was transferred to the 60-day injured list on July 2. On August 11, it was announced that González had undergone surgery to repair a labrum tear in his shoulder and would miss the remainder of the season. González was designated for assignment by the White Sox on January 26, 2024.

=== Boston Red Sox ===
On January 31, 2024, González was claimed off waivers by the Boston Red Sox. He was optioned to the Triple–A Worcester Red Sox to begin the 2024 season. González was recalled to Boston on April 9, then placed on the injured list four days later due to a left wrist sprain. He remained on the injured list until being activated on May 8.

During González's first season with the Red Sox, he appeared in a career-high 89 games and started a career-high 41 times. His performance at the plate set new career highs nearly across the board, finishing with six home runs, 29 RBI, a batting average of .266, and an OPS of .723. González also showed utility for the Red Sox, appearing nine or more times at first base, second base, third base, shortstop, and in the outfield.

In March 2026, Gonzalez underwent a left shoulder arthroscopic debridement. He had been shutdown from baseball activities during Spring Training. The Red Sox subsequently placed him on the 60-day injured list. González was activated on June 28, ahead of Boston's matchup against the New York Yankees. On August 4th, he was optioned to AAA. In 2026, he finished the season hitting .185, with a .222 OPS and 1 Home Run.
