= Tyler Uberstine =

American baseball player (born 1999)

Atlanta Braves
- Pitcher
- Born: June 1, 1999 (age 27); Santa Monica, California, U.S.
- Bats: Right Throws: Right

MLB debut
- April 5, 2026, for the Boston Red Sox

MLB statistics (through 2026 season)
- Win–loss record: 0–1
- Earned run average: 3.38
- Strikeouts: 2
- Stats at Baseball Reference

Teams
- Boston Red Sox (2026)

Tyler James Uberstine (born June 1, 1999) is an American professional baseball pitcher for the Atlanta Braves of Major League Baseball (MLB). He has previously played in MLB for the Boston Red Sox. He made his MLB debut in 2026.

== Career ==
=== Boston Red Sox ===
Uberstine played college baseball at Northwestern University. He was selected by the Boston Red Sox in the 19th round (556th overall) of the 2021 Major League Baseball draft. He made five appearances in the Florida Complex League during the 2021 season.

In 2022, Uberstine split time between the Single-A Salem Red Sox and High-A Greenville Drive. He did not play during 2023—he underwent Tommy John surgery on June 14, 2023—then returned to Greenville late in the 2024 season. After the 2024 season, he played in the Arizona Fall League.

Uberstine split the 2025 season between the Double-A Portland Sea Dogs and Triple-A Worcester Red Sox, posting a 6–5 record and 3.58 earned run average (ERA) with 137 strikeouts in 120 2/3 innings pitched across 25 games (21 starts). On November 18, 2025, the Red Sox added Uberstine to their 40-man roster to protect him from the Rule 5 draft.

Uberstine was optioned to Triple-A Worcester to begin the 2026 season. On April 3, 2026, Uberstine was promoted to the major leagues for the first time following an injury to Johan Oviedo. Uberstine made his major-league debut at Fenway Park on April 5; pitching in relief against the San Diego Padres, he surrendered a home run to Jackson Merrill in the eighth inning and took the loss. Uberstine was optioned on April 6.

=== Atlanta Braves ===
On August 3, 2026, the Red Sox traded Uberstine to the Atlanta Braves in exchange for Eli White.
