= Chad Tracy =

Chad Tracy may refer to:

- Chad Tracy (third baseman) (born 1980), American baseball player
- Chad Tracy (baseball manager) (born 1985), American baseball manager and player
