= Wyatt Olds =

American baseball player (born 1999)

Boston Red Sox – No. 75
- Pitcher
- Born: August 5, 1999 (age 27); Oklahoma City, Oklahoma, U.S.
- Bats: Right Throws: Right

MLB debut
- August 17, 2026, for the Boston Red Sox

MLB statistics (through 2026 season)
- Win–loss record: 2–0
- Earned run average: 1.15
- Strikeouts: 20
- Stats at Baseball Reference

Teams
- Boston Red Sox (2026–present)

Christopher Wyatt Olds (born August 5, 1999) is an American professional baseball pitcher for the Boston Red Sox of Major League Baseball (MLB). He made his MLB debut in 2026.

== Amateur career ==
Olds was the top–rated high school prospect in the state of Oklahoma in 2018 coming out of McLoud High School; he subsequently committed to play college baseball at the University of Oklahoma.

== Professional career ==
Olds was selected by the Boston Red Sox in the seventh round, with the 196th overall selection, of the 2021 Major League Baseball draft. He split his first professional season between the rookie–level Florida Complex League Red Sox and Single-A Salem Red Sox, recording a 2.25 earned run average (ERA) over six total appearances.

Olds split the 2022 season between the High-A Greenville Drive and Double-A Portland Sea Dogs. In 27 appearances (including 26 starts) for the two affiliates, he posted a cumulative 4–9 win–loss record and a 5.92 ERA with 133 strikeouts over 111 innings pitched. In 2023, Olds played for Portland and the FCL Red Sox, accumulating a 1–9 record and a 7.54 ERA with 75 strikeouts in 65 2/3 innings pitched across 28 appearances (12 starts).

Olds returned to Portland for a third consecutive season in 2024, also splitting time with the Triple-A Worcester Red Sox. In 43 appearances pitching primarily out of the bullpen, he logged a combined 4–4 record and a 6.09 ERA with 109 strikeouts and two saves. Olds returned to the two affiliates in the 2025 season, pitching to a combined 7–4 record and a 5.05 ERA with 77 strikeouts and one save across 42 relief appearances.

Olds began the 2026 campaign with Triple–A Worcester, compiling a 5–6 record and a 5.33 ERA with 74 strikeouts and five saves across 39 appearances out of the bullpen. On August 17, 2026, Olds was selected to the 40-man roster and promoted to the major leagues for the first time. He made his major league debut at Fenway Park, closing out Boston's 11–1 victory over the Arizona Diamondbacks; he struck out the first two batters he faced. Olds was optioned back to Worcester on August 29.
