= Jack Anderson (baseball, born 1999) =

American baseball player (born 1999)

New York Mets
- Pitcher
- Born: November 23, 1999 (age 26); Tampa, Florida, U.S.
- Bats: Right Throws: Right

MLB debut
- April 14, 2026, for the Boston Red Sox

MLB statistics (through 2026 season)
- Win–loss record: 1–0
- Earned run average: 2.19
- Strikeouts: 12
- Stats at Baseball Reference

Teams
- Boston Red Sox (2026); Minnesota Twins (2026)

Jack Thomas Anderson (born November 23, 1999) is an American professional baseball pitcher for the New York Mets of Major League Baseball (MLB). He has previously played in MLB for the Boston Red Sox and Minnesota Twins.

== Amateur career ==
Anderson attended Jesuit High School in Tampa, Florida, and Florida State University, where he played college baseball for the Florida State Seminoles during the 2019–2021 seasons. In 2020, he made five appearances, all starts, in the Florida Collegiate Summer League.

== Professional career ==
=== Detroit Tigers ===
Anderson was selected by the Detroit Tigers in the 16th round (465th overall) of the 2021 Major League Baseball draft. That season, he made five appearances, all in relief, in Florida Complex League games for the Tigers.

During the 2022 season, Anderson played for both the Single-A Lakeland Flying Tigers and the High-A West Michigan Whitecaps. Overall, he made 39 appearances, all in relief, posting a 3.47 earned run average (ERA) while striking out 72 batters in 59 2/3 innings pitched. After the regular season, he made 10 relief appearances in the Arizona Fall League. Anderson returned to West Michigan in 2023, recording a 4.80 ERA in 39 relief appearances while striking out 43 batters in 54 1/3 innings pitched.

In 2024, Anderson split time between West Michigan and the Triple-A Toledo Mud Hens. In a combined 35 appearances (1 start), he pitched to a 3.66 ERA while recording 60 strikeouts in 66 1/3 innings pitched.

=== Boston Red Sox ===
On December 11, 2024, the Boston Red Sox selected Anderson from the Tigers in the minor league phase of the Rule 5 draft.

During 2025, Anderson pitched for two Boston farm teams, the Double-A Portland Sea Dogs and the Triple-A Worcester Red Sox. In 26 total games (seven starts), he struck out 101 batters in 86 2/3 innings pitched while posting a 4.57 ERA. Prior to the 2026 regular season, Anderson pitched for the Great Britain national baseball team in the 2026 World Baseball Classic.

Anderson began the 2026 regular season with Worcester. On April 14, 2026, the Red Sox selected Anderson to the 40-man roster and promoted him to the major leagues for the first time. He made his major league debut that day, recording four strikeouts and allowing one run over three innings pitched. Anderson made three appearances for Boston, recording a 3.38 ERA with six strikeouts over eight innings of work. Anderson was designated for assignment on July 6, following Patrick Sandoval's activation from the 60-day injured list.

=== Minnesota Twins ===
On July 11, 2026, Anderson was claimed off waivers by the Minnesota Twins. Anderson made four scoreless appearances for Minnesota, recording one victory, six strikeouts, and one save across 4 1/3 innings pitched.

=== New York Mets ===
On November 2, 2026, Anderson was claimed off of waivers by the New York Mets.

== See also ==
- Rule 5 draft results
