= Jhostynxon García =

Venezuelan baseball player (born 2002)

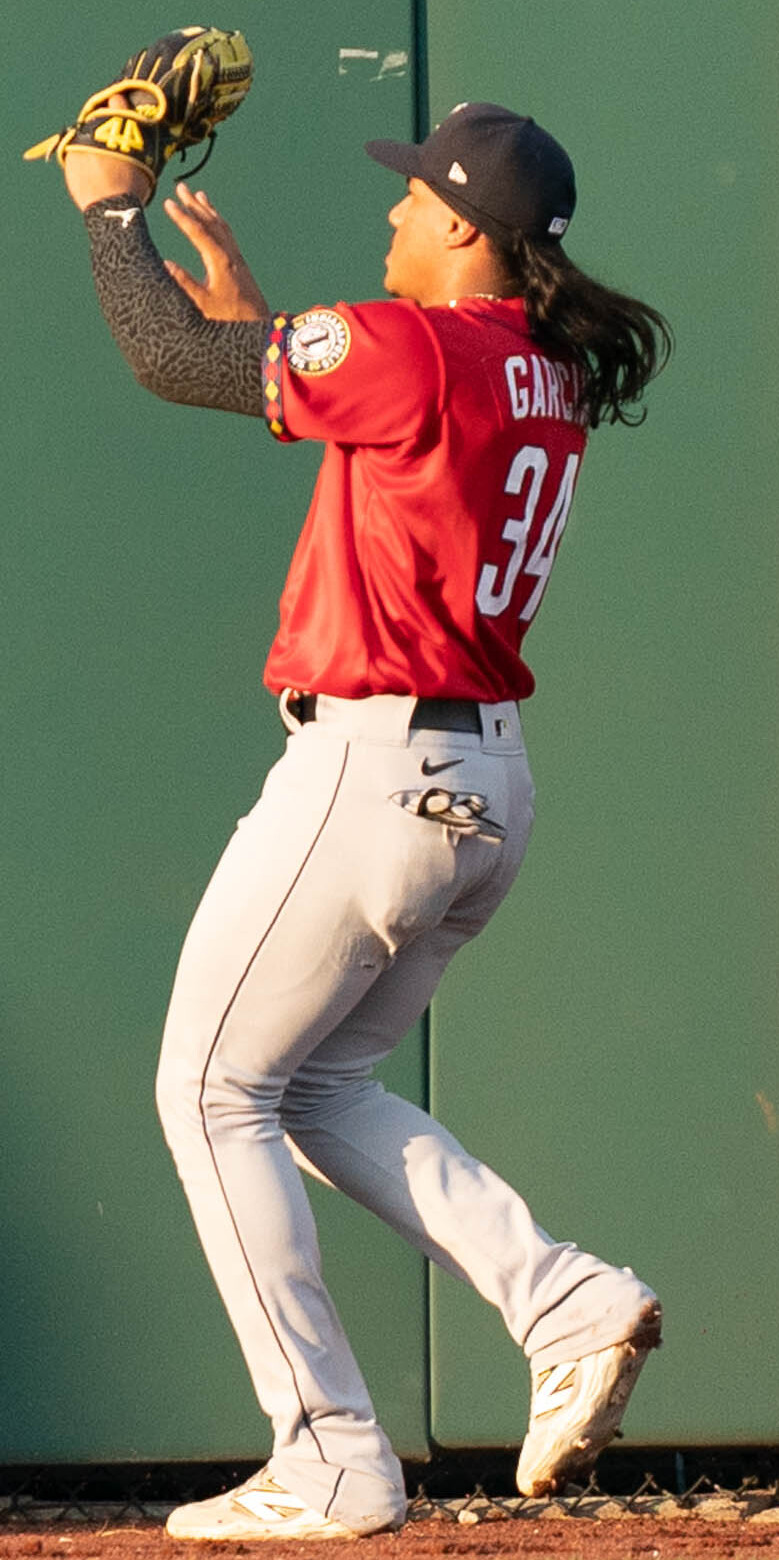
- García with the Indianapolis Indians in 2026

Pittsburgh Pirates – No. 34
- Outfielder
- Born: December 11, 2002 (age 23); San Fernando de Apure, Venezuela
- Bats: Right Throws: Right

MLB debut
- August 22, 2025, for the Boston Red Sox

MLB statistics (through 2026 season)
- Batting average: .164
- Home runs: 0
- Runs batted in: 2
- Stats at Baseball Reference

Teams
- Boston Red Sox (2025); Pittsburgh Pirates (2026–present)

Jhostynxon Alirio García (/dʒoʊˈstɪnsoʊn/ joh-STIN-sohn, born December 11, 2002) nicknamed "The Password", is a Venezuelan professional baseball outfielder for the Pittsburgh Pirates of Major League Baseball (MLB). He signed with the Boston Red Sox as an international free agent in 2019, and made his MLB debut in 2025. The Red Sox traded him to the Pirates after the 2025 season.

== Career ==
=== Boston Red Sox ===
On July 2, 2019, García signed with the Boston Red Sox as an international free agent. He did not play in a game in 2020 due to the cancellation of the minor league season because of the COVID-19 pandemic. He was assigned to the Dominican Summer League Red Sox on July 10, 2021, and posted a .281/.424/.481 slash line with 32 strikeouts in 135 at-bats.

García spent the 2022 campaign with the Rookie-League Florida Complex League Red Sox, playing in 31 games and batting .188/.328/.366 with three home runs, 17 RBI, and four stolen bases. He was promoted to the Single-A Salem Red Sox on June 1, 2023, playing in 73 games and slashing .230/.329/.374 with four home runs, 24 RBI, and nine stolen bases.

García was added to the Boston Red Sox' 40-man roster on March 15, 2024, before being placed on the 7-day injured list with a left hamstring strain. After being activated from the injured list on May 5, García was promoted to the High-A Greenville Drive on May 29 and hit for 44 runs, 65 hits, 16 home runs and a .311 batting average before being promoted from Greenville Drive to the Double-A Portland Sea Dogs on August 13. He culminated the season with a .263 batting average during his time at Portland, and slashed an overall .286/.356/.536 for the year with 78 runs, 66 RBI, 23 home runs and 17 stolen bases across a total 412 at-bats in 107 games played. He was activated on the 40-man Boston Red Sox roster on March 6, 2025 to protect him from the Rule 5 draft, before being optioned back to Portland to begin the 2025 season.

He began the season by posting a .256/.355/.393 slash line with 19 runs off 30 hits, 3 home runs, and 29 strikeouts in 117 at-bats before being promoted to the Triple-A Worcester Red Sox on May 20, where he slashed .417/.440/.708 with 5 runs, 10 hits, 2 home runs and only 5 strikeouts in his first six games. García was selected for the 2025 MLB All-Star Futures Game to play for the American League team, and struck out twice in his two plate appearances.

On August 21, García was recalled to the Boston Red Sox from Worcester after outfielder Wilyer Abreu was placed on the 10-day injured list with a calf sprain. García was assigned uniform number 51, and travelled to New York City to join the team in a four-game series against the New York Yankees. He made his major-league debut in the second game of series, starting in right field for the game of August 22; he went 0-for-3 at the plate with a walk. On August 28, García recorded a double in the 5th inning of Boston's final game of a four-game series against the Baltimore Orioles for the first hit of his major league career. He played in five games for Boston during his rookie campaign, going 1-for-7 (.143) with two walks.

=== Pittsburgh Pirates ===
On December 4, 2025, the Red Sox traded García and Jesus Travieso to the Pittsburgh Pirates in exchange for Johan Oviedo, Tyler Samaniego, and Adonys Guzman. García was optioned to the Triple-A Indianapolis Indians to begin the 2026 season.

== Personal life ==
His younger brother, Johanfran García, nicknamed "The Username", is a professional baseball catcher, designated hitter, and first baseman who signed with the Red Sox as an international free agent in 2022.
