= Eduardo Rivera (baseball) =

Puerto Rican baseball player (born 2003)

St. Louis Cardinals
- Pitcher
- Born: June 13, 2003 (age 23); San Juan, Puerto Rico
- Bats: Left Throws: Left

MLB debut
- April 22, 2026, for the Boston Red Sox

MLB statistics (through 2026 season)
- Win–loss record: 0–1
- Earned run average: 6.30
- Strikeouts: 10
- Stats at Baseball Reference

Teams
- Boston Red Sox (2026)

Eduardo Yael Rivera (born June 13, 2003) is a Puerto Rican professional baseball pitcher for the St. Louis Cardinals of Major League Baseball (MLB). He has previously played in MLB for the Boston Red Sox.

== Career ==
=== Oakland Athletics / Athletics ===
The Oakland Athletics selected Rivera in the 11th round of the 2021 Major League Baseball draft. That summer, he played four games in the MLB Draft League and one game in the Arizona Complex League (ACL). In 2022, he played in eight ACL games; his season was shortened by injury. Rivera spent the 2023 season with the Single-A Stockton Ports; in 16 games (12 starts) he posted a 2–7 win–loss record with a 5.34 earned run average (ERA) while striking out 75 batters in 69 innings pitched. During the 2023–24 offseason, Rivera played in the Puerto Rican Winter League (PRWL).

Rivera and split time between Stockton and the High-A Lansing Lugnuts to begin the 2024 campaign. He was released by the Athletics organization on May 21, 2024.

=== Boston Red Sox ===
On June 12, 2024, Rivera signed a minor league contract with the Boston Red Sox organization. He made appearances in the Florida Complex League and for the Single-A Salem Red Sox. Overall with four affiliates during the regular season, Rivera made 18 appearances (7 starts) while posting a 4.35 ERA and a 1–3 record while striking out 49 batters 41 1/3 innings. During the 2024–25 offseason, he played in the PRWL and played for Puerto Rico in the Caribbean Series.

Rivera split time during the 2025 regular season between the High-A Greenville Drive and Double-A Portland Sea Dogs. Overall, he made 20 appearances (15 starts) while posting a 4–6 record with a 2.48 ERA while striking out 108 batters in 87 innings. During the 2025–26 offseason, he again played in the PRWL.

Rivera played for Puerto Rico in the 2026 World Baseball Classic, appearing in two games (one start) while posting a 4.05 ERA without a decision. Rivera began the 2026 regular season with Portland and was promoted to the Triple-A Worcester Red Sox on April 21. The next day, before making an appearance for Worcester, the Red Sox added him to their major-league roster. Rivera made his MLB debut that evening, pitching 3 1/3 scoreless innings in relief during a Red Sox loss to the New York Yankees at Fenway Park. Rivera was optioned back to Worcester following a start on July 22 against the Baltimore Orioles in which he allowed four earned runs in only 2/3 of an inning. In four total appearances for Boston, he logged an 0–1 record and 6.30 ERA with 10 strikeouts over 10 innings of work. On September 1, the Red Sox placed Rivera on the 60–day injured list due to a lumbar strain, officially ending his season. On November 2, Rivera was designated for assignment by Boston.

=== St. Louis Cardinals ===
On November 3, 2026, the Red Sox traded Rivera to the St. Louis Cardinals in exchange for minor-league pitcher Juan Carlos García.
