= Ryan Watson (baseball) =

American baseball player (born 1997)

Los Angeles Angels – No. 56
- Pitcher
- Born: November 15, 1997 (age 28); Auburn, Alabama, U.S.
- Bats: Right Throws: Right

MLB debut
- March 28, 2026, for the Boston Red Sox

MLB statistics (through 2026 season)
- Win–loss record: 1–1
- Earned run average: 4.00
- Strikeouts: 65
- Stats at Baseball Reference

Teams
- Boston Red Sox (2026); Los Angeles Angels (2026–present)

Ryan Traylor Watson (born November 15, 1997) is an American professional baseball pitcher for the Los Angeles Angels of Major League Baseball (MLB). He made his MLB debut in 2026 with the Boston Red Sox as a Rule 5 selection.

== Amateur career ==
Watson grew up in Auburn, Alabama, and attended Auburn High School. He was selected in 39th round by the Los Angeles Dodgers in 2016 Major League Baseball draft, but opted not to sign with the team.

Watson attended Auburn University and played college baseball for the Auburn Tigers for four seasons. As a junior, he made 24 appearances and posted a 1–1 win–loss record with a 4.87 earned run average (ERA). Watson made five appearances and had a 1.23 ERA with seven strikeouts in 2020 before the season was cut short due to the coronavirus pandemic.

== Professional career ==
=== Baltimore Orioles ===
Watson was signed by the Baltimore Orioles as an undrafted free agent after going unselected in the 2020 Major League Baseball draft on June 15, 2020. He began the season with the Low-A Delmarva Shorebirds and was promoted to the High-A Aberdeen IronBirds after posting a 2.14 ERA in 33 2/3 innings pitched. Watson was assigned to the Bowie Baysox of the Double-A Eastern League at the beginning of the 2022 season.

In 2024, Watson made 17 appearances split between Bowie and the Triple–A Norfolk Tides, accumulating a 2.38 ERA with 23 strikeouts and two saves across 22 2/3 innings pitched.

=== San Francisco Giants ===
On August 9, 2024, Watson was traded to the San Francisco Giants in exchange for cash considerations.

=== Boston Red Sox ===
On December 10, 2025, Watson was selected by the Athletics in the Rule 5 draft; he was subsequently traded to the Boston Red Sox in exchange for Justin Reimer and cash considerations. Watson made Boston's Opening Day roster, and made his major league debut on March 28, 2026 against the Cincinnati Reds. Watson joined Garrett Whitlock and Justin Slaten as Rule 5 selections who made the Red Sox's roster within the previous five years. He made 35 total appearances for Boston, compiling a 1–0 record and 4.53 ERA with 43 strikeouts across 55 2/3 innings pitched. Watson, who could not be optioned due to his Rule 5 draft status, was designated for assignment by the Red Sox on August 4.

=== Los Angeles Angels ===
On August 7, 2026, the Los Angeles Angels claimed Watson off waivers from the Red Sox.

== See also ==
- Rule 5 draft results
