= Alec Gamboa =

American baseball player (born 1997)

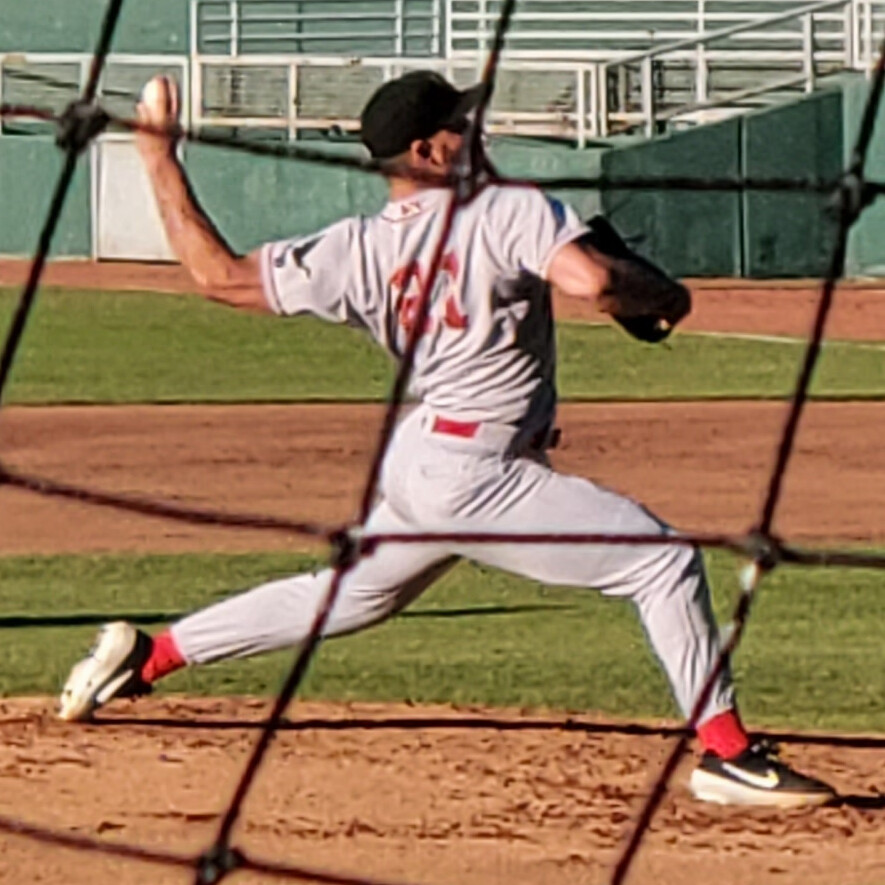
- Gamboa with the Great Lakes Loons in 2021

Boston Red Sox – No. 68
- Pitcher
- Born: January 17, 1997 (age 29); Madera, California, U.S.
- Bats: Switch Throws: Left

Professional debut
- KBO: May 27, 2025, for the Lotte Giants
- MLB: May 5, 2026, for the Boston Red Sox

KBO statistics (through 2025 season)
- Win–loss record: 7–8
- Earned run average: 3.58
- Strikeouts: 117

MLB statistics (through 2026 season)
- Win–loss record: 1–0
- Earned run average: 1.91
- Strikeouts: 23
- Stats at Baseball Reference

Teams
- Lotte Giants (2025); Boston Red Sox (2026–present)

Alec Durbin Gamboa (born January 17, 1997) is an American professional baseball pitcher for the Boston Red Sox of Major League Baseball (MLB). He made his MLB debut in 2026. He has previously played in the KBO League for the Lotte Giants.

== Early life ==
Gamboa grew up in Madera, California, and enrolled at California State University, Fresno after high school. He subsequently underwent Tommy John surgery in 2016, and later transferred to Fresno City College, where he played college baseball.

== Professional career ==
=== Los Angeles Dodgers ===
Gamboa was drafted by the Los Angeles Dodgers in the ninth round, with the 281st overall selection, of the 2019 Major League Baseball draft. He made his professional debut with the rookie-level Arizona League Dodgers, recording a 2.88 earned run average (ERA) with 33 strikeouts in 12 games. Gamboa did not play in a game in 2020 due to the cancellation of the minor league season because of the COVID-19 pandemic.

Gamboa returned to action in 2021 with the High-A Great Lakes Loons, logging a 4–5 win–loss record and 4.21 ERA with 71 strikeouts across 22 games; he made 30 appearances for the Double-A Tulsa Drillers during the 2022 campaign, posting an 11–4 record and 5.91 ERA with 72 strikeouts. Gamboa split the 2023 season between Tulsa and the Triple-A Oklahoma City Dodgers. In 37 appearances (three starts) for the two affiliates, he accumulated an aggregate 9–4 record and 3.66 ERA with 76 strikeouts and one save across 76 1/3 innings pitched.

Gamboa spent the 2024 campaign with the Triple-A Oklahoma City Baseball Club, where he compiled a 3–6 record and 3.30 ERA with 51 strikeouts in 73 2/3 innings pitched across 22 appearances (12 starts). He began 2025 with the Triple-A Oklahoma City Comets, posting an 0–2 record and 4.19 ERA with 12 strikeouts over eight games. Gamboa was released by the Dodgers organization on May 13, 2025, in order to pursue an opportunity in South Korea.

=== Lotte Giants ===
On May 14, 2025, Gamboa signed with the Lotte Giants of the KBO League as an injury replacement for Charlie Barnes. He was named the league's top player for June after going 5–0 with a 1.72 ERA—both league-leading marks—and ranking second in innings pitched (31 1/3).

=== Boston Red Sox ===
On December 9, 2025, Gamboa signed a minor league contract with the Boston Red Sox. He was assigned to the Triple-A Worcester Red Sox to begin the regular season. On May 4, 2026, the Red Sox selected Gamboa to their 40-man roster and promoted him to the major leagues for the first time. He made his MLB debut the following evening, striking out two batters in the ninth inning to close out a 10–3 victory over the Detroit Tigers.
