= Dillon Lawson =

American baseball coach (born 1985)

Miami Marlins
- Coach
- Born: May 23, 1985 (age 41); Louisville, Kentucky, U.S.
- Bats: Right Throws: Right

Teams
- As coach: New York Yankees (2022–2023); Boston Red Sox (2025–2026); Miami Marlins (2026–present)

Dillon Lawson (born May 23, 1985) is an American professional baseball coach, currently serving as the hitting coach for the Miami Marlins. He previously served as the hitting coach for the New York Yankees and as the assistant hitting coach for the Boston Red Sox.

== Career ==
Lawson attended Transylvania University, where he played college baseball as a catcher and first baseman. After graduating, he became a coach at Lindenwood University from 2007 to 2009, IMG Academy from 2010 through 2011, Morehead State University from 2009 through 2012, and Southeast Missouri State University from 2012 through 2015. In 2016, Lawson was the hitting coach for the Tri-City ValleyCats, and in 2017 he coached for the University of Missouri. In 2018, he coached for the Quad Cities River Bandits.

The New York Yankees hired Lawson as their minor league hitting coordinator in 2018. After the 2021 season, the Yankees promoted him to be their major league hitting coach. He was fired on July 9, 2023.

On December 20, 2023, Lawson was hired by the Boston Red Sox to serve as a hitting coordinator, primarily to work with Boston's upper–level minor leaguers. On October 27, 2024, Lawson was named assistant hitting coach for the Red Sox. On April 25, 2026, Lawson was fired by the Red Sox.

On October 12, 2026, Lawson was announced as the hitting coach for the Miami Marlins.

== Personal life ==
Lawson graduated from Transylvania University in 2007 with a degree in exercise science. In 2008, he earned a master's degree from Lindenwood University in education with a focus on strength and conditioning. As of 2024, Lawson was married with three sons.
