= Mikey Romero =

American baseball player (born 2004)

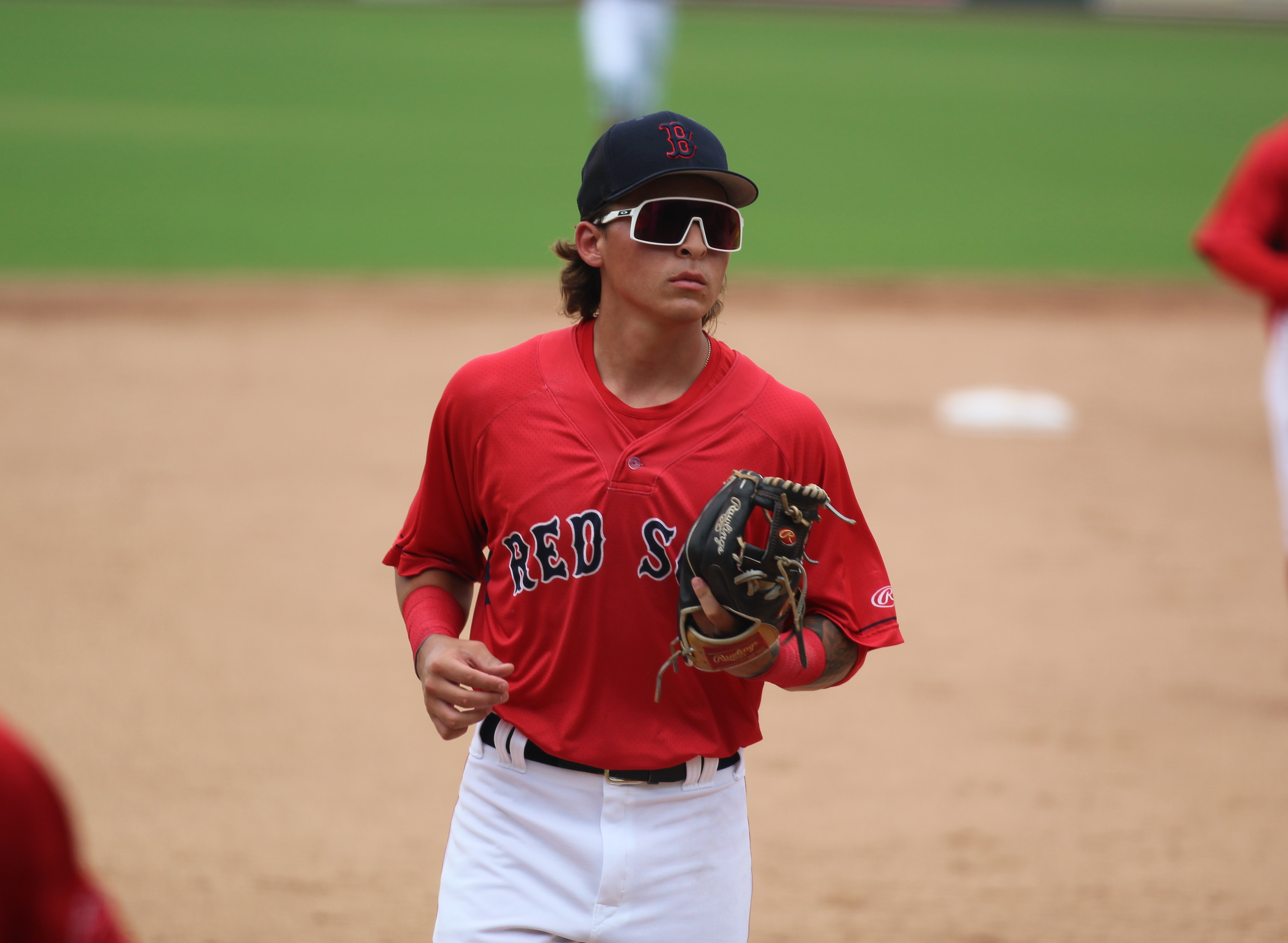
- Romero with the Florida Complex League Red Sox in 2022

Boston Red Sox
- Second baseman / Third baseman
- Born: January 12, 2004 (age 22); San Diego, California, U.S.
- Bats: Left Throws: Right
- Stats at Baseball Reference

Michael Lorenzo Romero (born January 12, 2004) is an American professional baseball second baseman and third baseman in the Boston Red Sox organization.

== Amateur career ==
Romero attended Orange Lutheran High School in Orange, California. He played for the United States in the gold medal game of the U-12 Baseball World Cup in 2016 and in qualifying round of the U-15 Baseball World Cup in 2019. As a high school junior in 2021, he had a .362 batting average. That summer, he played in the Perfect Game All-American Classic at Petco Park. Romero originally committed to play college baseball for the Arizona Wildcats, but flipped his commitment to the LSU Tigers after coach Jay Johnson left Arizona for LSU. He entered his senior year of high school in 2022 as a top prospect for the upcoming draft. He finished the season with a .372 batting average.

== Professional career ==
Romero was drafted in the first round with the 24th overall selection by the Boston Red Sox in the 2022 Major League Baseball draft. He signed with the team on July 25, for $2.3 million. Romero made his professional debut with the Rookie-level Florida Complex League (FCL) Red Sox. He was later promoted to the Single-A Salem Red Sox. Over 19 games between the two teams, he batted .304 with one home run and 17 runs batted in (RBI).

Romero split the 2023 season between three teams; Salem, the High-A Greenville Drive, and a rehab assignment with the FCL Red Sox and posted a combined .214 batting average with 13 RBI over 34 games. A back injury forced him to spend time on the injured list during the season.

Romero entered the 2024 season ranked as the Red Sox' number 16 minor-league prospect by Baseball America, slated to begin the season with Greenville. For the season, he appeared in 59 games with Greenville, 16 games with the Double-A Portland Sea Dogs, and three games in the FCL, he hit .271 with 16 home runs and 53 RBI in 78 games. He missed time during the season due to starting on the injured list, and then suffering a concussion in August.

Romero began the 2025 season with Portland. On August 1, 2025, he was promoted to the Triple-A Worcester Red Sox. Over 111 games between the two teams, Romero hit .245 with 17 home runs, 76 RBI and 33 doubles.

Romero played the 2026 season with Worcester. Across 113 games, he batted .239 with 12 home runs and 61 RBI.

== Personal life ==
Romero's sisters Sierra and Sydney both played professional softball.
