= List of Gold Glove Award winners at outfield =

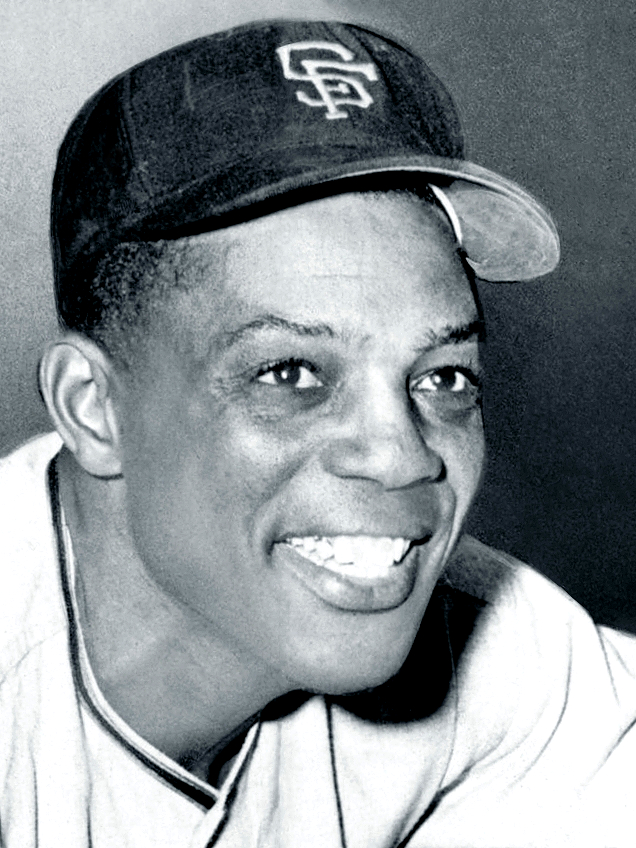
Willie Mays is tied with Roberto Clemente for the most Gold Gloves won by an outfielder, with 12 awards each.

The Rawlings Gold Glove Award, usually referred to as the Gold Glove, is the award given annually to the Major League Baseball players judged to have exhibited superior individual fielding performances at each fielding position in both the National League (NL) and the American League (AL), as voted by the managers and coaches in each league. Managers are not permitted to vote for their own players. Twenty-two Gold Gloves are awarded each year (with the exception of 1957, 1985, 2007 and 2018), one at each of the nine positions, one for a utility player, and one for a team as a whole, in each respective league. In 1957, the baseball glove manufacturer Rawlings created the Gold Glove Award to commemorate the best fielding performance at each position. The award was created from a glove made from gold lamé-tanned leather and affixed to a walnut base. Initially, only one Gold Glove per position was awarded to the top fielder at each position in the entire major league; however, separate awards were given for the National and American Leagues beginning in 1958.

The phrase "at each position" was not strictly accurate until 2011, when the awards were changed to specify individual awards for left fielder, center fielder, and right fielder. Previously, the prize was presented to three outfielders irrespective of their specific position. Any combination of outfielders, often three center fielders, could win the award in the same year. Critics called for awarding a single Gold Glove for each individual outfield position, arguing that the three outfield positions are not equivalent defensively. In the 1985 American League voting, a tie for third-place resulted in the presentation of Gold Glove Awards to four outfielders (Dwayne Murphy, Gary Pettis, Dwight Evans and Dave Winfield); this scenario was repeated in the National League in 2007 (Andruw Jones, Carlos Beltrán, Aaron Rowand, and Jeff Francoeur). Father and son Bobby and Barry Bonds are the only family pair who have won Gold Glove Awards as outfielders.

Roberto Clemente and Willie Mays are tied for the most Gold Gloves won among outfielders; Clemente won 12 consecutive National League awards with the Pittsburgh Pirates, as did Mays with the New York and San Francisco Giants. Four outfielders are tied for the second-highest total with 10 wins: Andruw Jones, Ken Griffey Jr., Al Kaline, and Ichiro Suzuki. There is one 9-time winner, Torii Hunter, who won his awards consecutively. There have been seven 8-time winners (Barry Bonds, Evans, Paul Blair, Andre Dawson, Jim Edmonds, Alex Gordon and Garry Maddox), and five 7-time awardees (Winfield, Curt Flood, Larry Walker, Devon White and Carl Yastrzemski). Murphy, Mookie Betts and Kirby Puckett each won six awards; Murphy and Puckett won their awards in the American League while Betts won four in the American League and two in the National League. There have been eight 5-time winners and nine 4-time winners as well. Darin Erstad won a Gold Glove as a first baseman in 2004 after winning two awards in the outfield (2000, 2002), making him the only player to win the award as an infielder and an outfielder.

Eighteen outfielders have posted errorless Gold Glove-winning seasons: fourteen in the American League and four in the National League. The only players to accomplish the feat twice were Mickey Stanley, who posted a 1.000 fielding percentage in 1968 and 1970, and Nick Markakis, who posted a 1.000 FPct in 2011 and 2014. Other outfielders who have played complete seasons without an error include Flood (1966), Clemente (1972), Yastrzemski (1977), Hunter (2008), Gordon (2020), Ken Berry (1972), Bernie Williams (2000), Vernon Wells (2005), Franklin Gutiérrez (2010), Jacoby Ellsbury (2011), Andre Ethier (2011), Joey Gallo (2020), Tyler O'Neill (2020), and Joe Rudi, who played only 44 games in the outfield in 1975 while appearing in 91 games at first base. Murphy leads all outfield winners with 507 putouts in 1980, and Jones leads National Leaguers with 493 (1999). Clemente leads all winners in assists; he had 27 in 1961, and American League leaders Kaline and Gordon had 23 in 1958 and 2011 respectively. Jesse Barfield doubled off eight runners in consecutive seasons (1986 and 1987) for the Toronto Blue Jays, while Dave Parker leads all winners with nine double plays in 1977 for the Pirates.

== Key ==
Year	Links to the corresponding Major League Baseball season
PO	Putout
A	Assist
E	Error
DP	Double play
FPct	Fielding percentage
* or **	Winner of the most Gold Glove Awards at his position (** indicates tie)
†	Member of the National Baseball Hall of Fame and Museum
§	Indicates that a tie for third-place resulted in four outfield awards

== American League winners ==
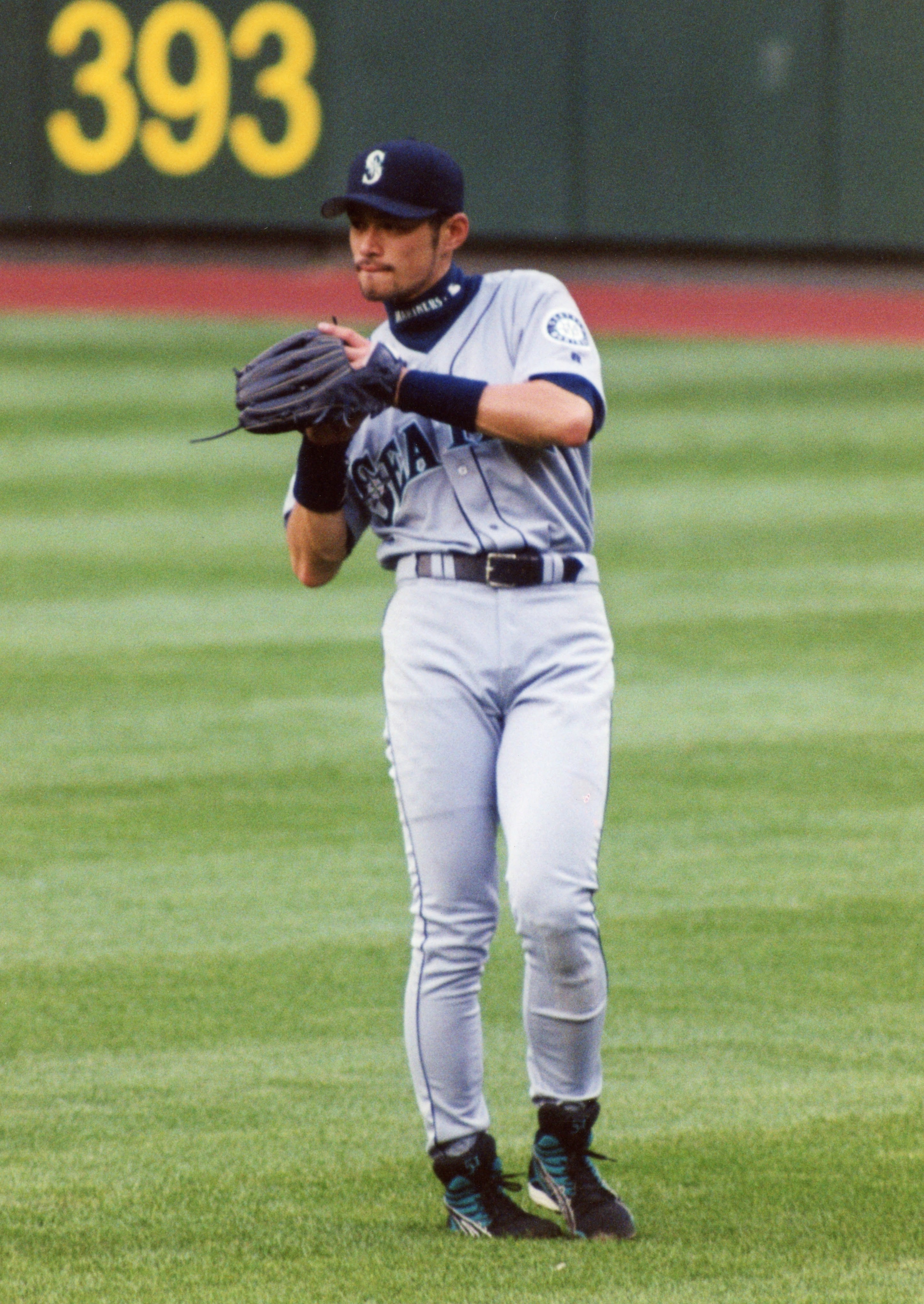
Ichiro Suzuki (AL Gold Glove winner, 2001–2010)

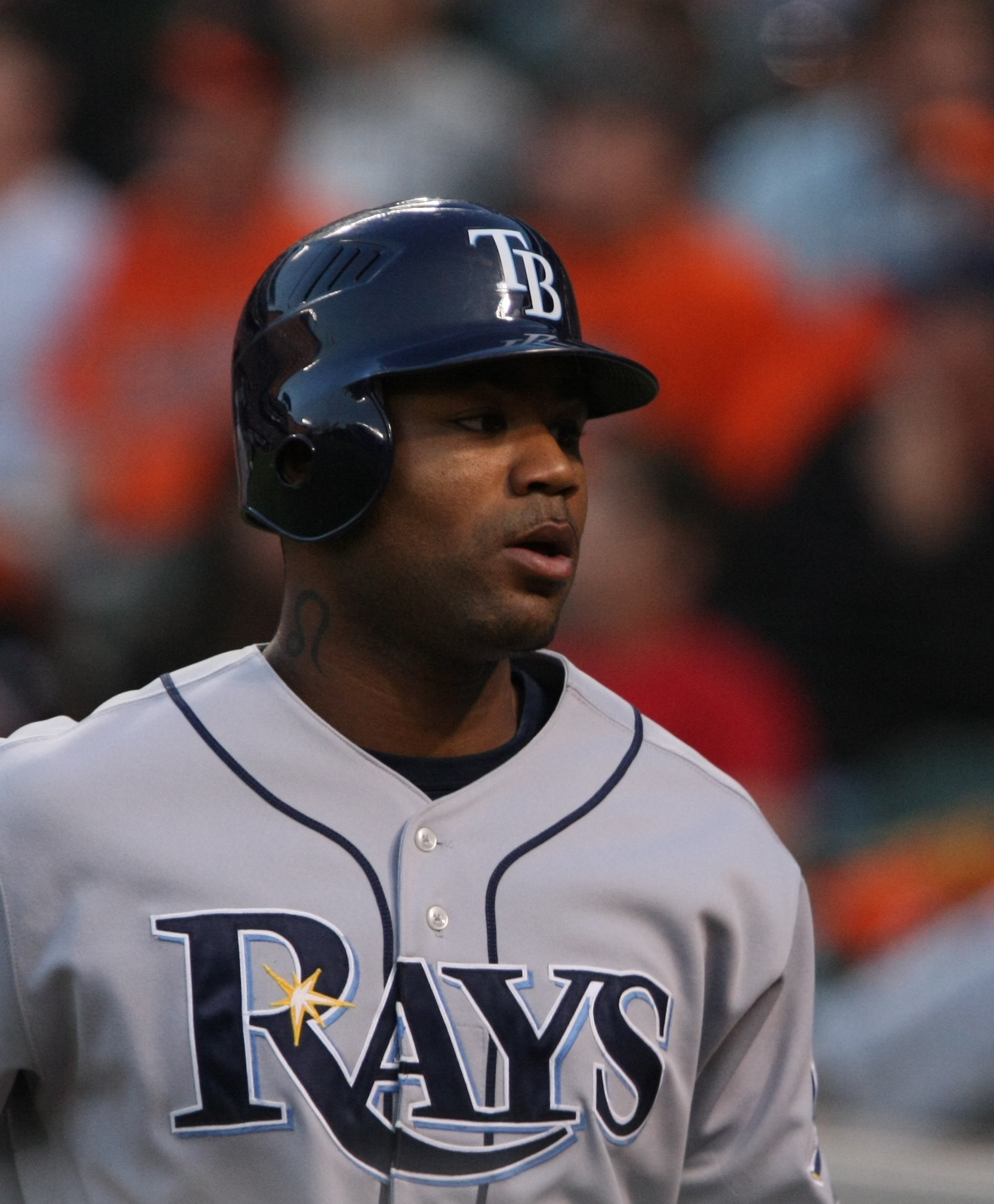
Carl Crawford (AL Gold Glove winner, 2010)

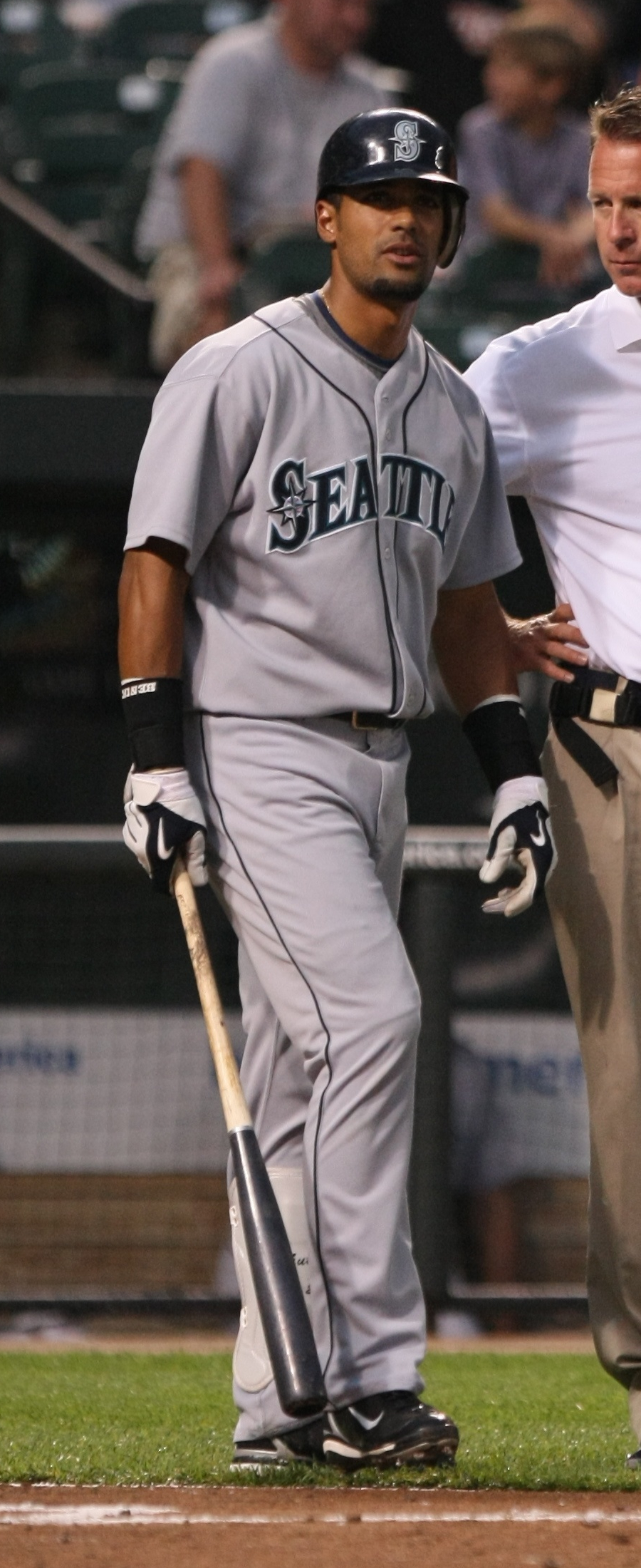
Franklin Gutiérrez (AL Gold Glove winner, 2010)

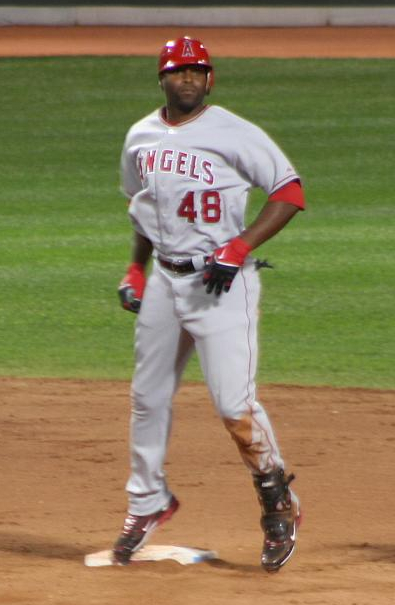
Torii Hunter (AL Gold Glove winner, 2001–2009)

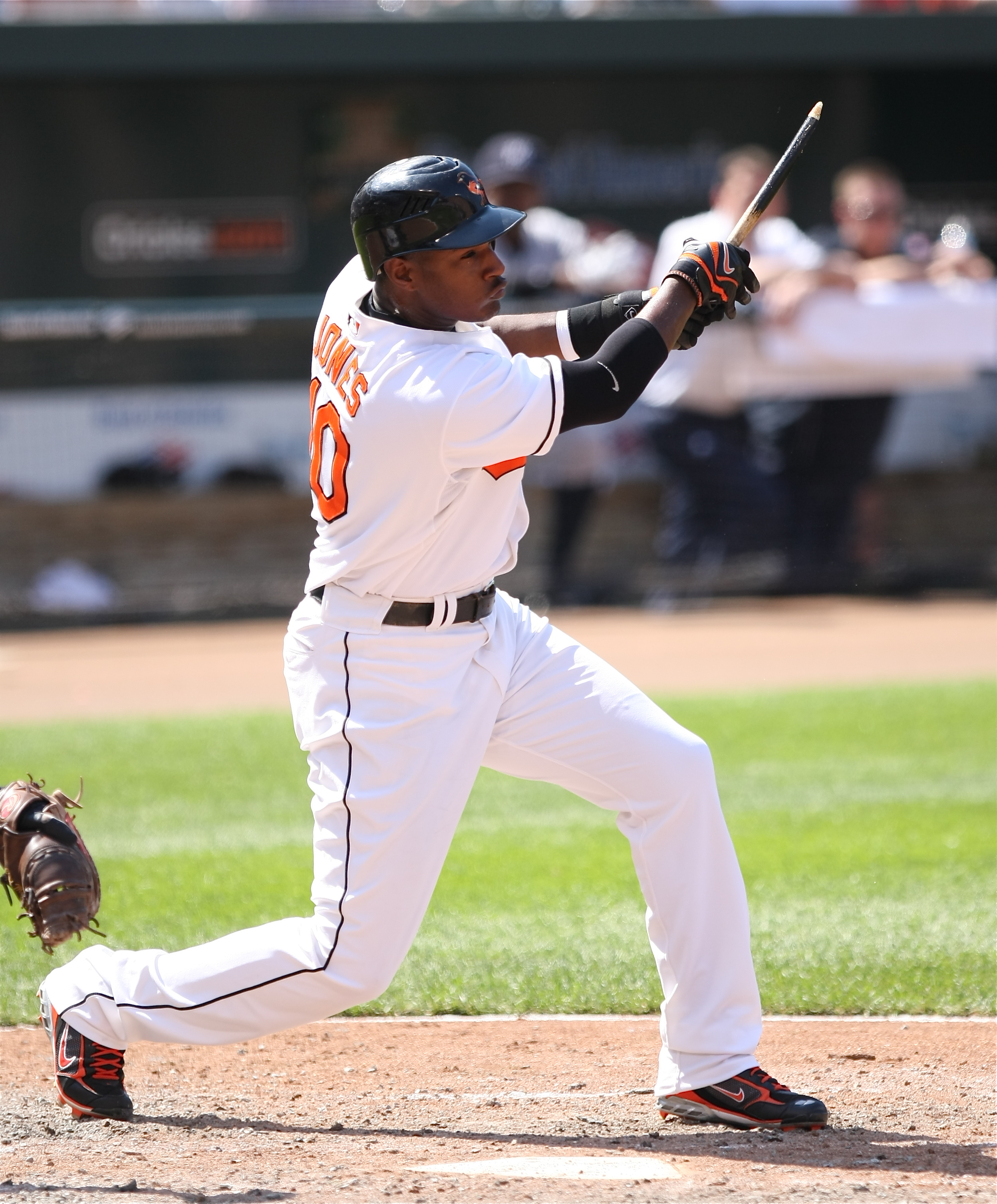
Adam Jones (AL Gold Glove winner, 2009)

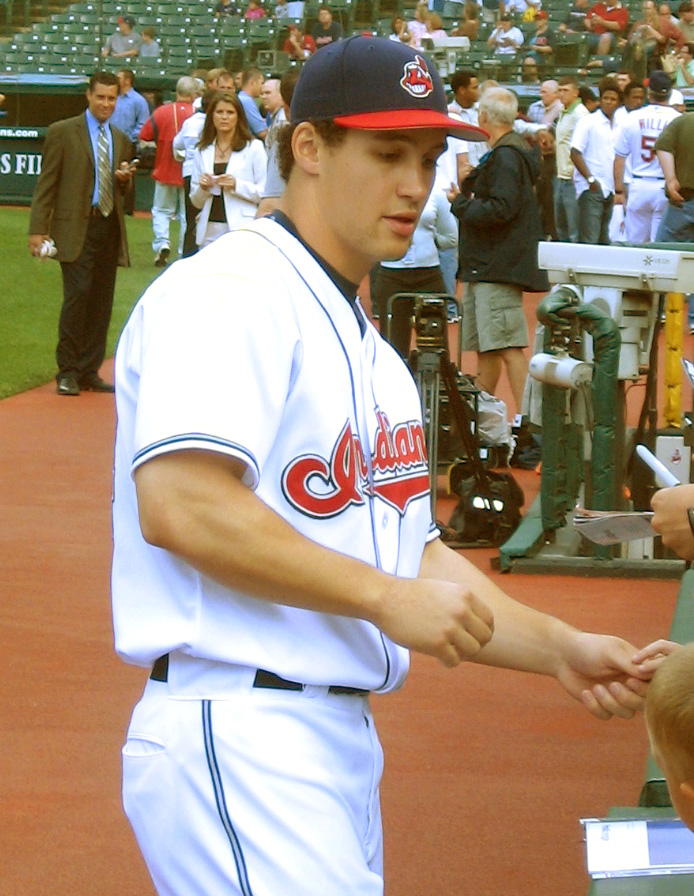
Grady Sizemore (AL Gold Glove winner, 2007–2008)

Year	Player	Team	PO	A	E	DP	FPct	Ref
1957 (Note: In 1957, Gold Gloves were given to the top fielders in Major League Baseball, instead of separate awards for the National and American Leagues; therefore, the winners are the same in each table.)	Al Kaline^{†}	Detroit Tigers	319	13	5	2	.985	
1957	Willie Mays**^{†}	New York Giants (NL)	419	14	9	4	.980	
1957	Minnie Miñoso^{†}	Chicago White Sox	295	9	5	2	.984	
1958	Al Kaline^{†}	Detroit Tigers	316	23	2	4	.994	
1958	Jim Piersall	Boston Red Sox	310	8	5	2	.985	
1958	Norm Siebern	New York Yankees	259	8	5	2	.982	
1959	Jackie Jensen	Boston Red Sox	311	12	6	4	.982	
1959	Al Kaline^{†}	Detroit Tigers	364	4	4	0	.989	
1959	Minnie Miñoso^{†}	Cleveland Indians	317	14	5	1	.985	
1960	Jim Landis	Chicago White Sox	376	10	6	3	.985	
1960	Roger Maris	New York Yankees	263	6	4	1	.985	
1960	Minnie Miñoso^{†}	Chicago White Sox	282	14	6	3	.980	
1961	Al Kaline^{†}	Detroit Tigers	378	9	4	3	.990	
1961	Jim Landis	Chicago White Sox	394	9	5	3	.988	
1961	Jim Piersall	Cleveland Indians	337	9	3	3	.991	
1962	Al Kaline^{†}	Detroit Tigers	225	8	4	1	.983	
1962	Jim Landis	Chicago White Sox	357	2	2	1	.994	
1962	Mickey Mantle^{†}	New York Yankees	214	4	5	1	.978	
1963	Al Kaline^{†}	Detroit Tigers	257	5	2	0	.992	
1963	Jim Landis	Chicago White Sox	259	6	2	0	.993	
1963	Carl Yastrzemski^{†}	Boston Red Sox	284	17	6	3	.980	
1964	Vic Davalillo	Cleveland Indians	348	10	5	5	.986	
1964	Al Kaline^{†}	Detroit Tigers	278	6	3	2	.990	
1964	Jim Landis	Chicago White Sox	178	8	1	2	.995	
1965	Al Kaline^{†}	Detroit Tigers	193	2	3	0	.985	
1965	Tom Tresh	New York Yankees	283	11	9	1	.970	
1965	Carl Yastrzemski^{†}	Boston Red Sox	222	11	3	2	.987	
1966	Tommie Agee	Chicago White Sox	376	12	7	7	.982	
1966	Al Kaline^{†}	Detroit Tigers	279	7	2	1	.993	
1966	Tony Oliva^{†}	Minnesota Twins	335	9	10	3	.972	
1967	Paul Blair	Baltimore Orioles	373	13	6	3	.985	
1967	Al Kaline^{†}	Detroit Tigers	217	14	4	2	.983	
1967	Carl Yastrzemski^{†}	Boston Red Sox	289	13	7	1	.977	
1968	Reggie Smith	Boston Red Sox	390	8	6	1	.985	
1968	Mickey Stanley	Detroit Tigers	301	7	0	3	1.000	
1968	Carl Yastrzemski^{†}	Boston Red Sox	297	13	7	1	.978	
1969	Paul Blair	Baltimore Orioles	402	12	5	5	.988	
1969	Mickey Stanley	Detroit Tigers	190	2	3	0	.985	
1969	Carl Yastrzemski^{†}	Boston Red Sox	301	12	3	3	.991	
1970	Ken Berry	Chicago White Sox	331	9	4	2	.988	
1970	Paul Blair	Baltimore Orioles	366	11	4	3	.990	
1970	Mickey Stanley	Detroit Tigers	328	3	0	0	1.000	
1971	Paul Blair	Baltimore Orioles	331	4	3	1	.991	
1971	Amos Otis	Kansas City Royals	401	10	4	4	.990	
1971	Carl Yastrzemski^{†}	Boston Red Sox	281	17	2	4	.993	
1972	Ken Berry	California Angels	272	13	0	5	1.000	
1972	Paul Blair	Baltimore Orioles	339	7	3	1	.991	
1972	Bobby Murcer	New York Yankees	382	11	3	1	.992	
1973	Paul Blair	Baltimore Orioles	371	14	4	4	.990	
1973	Amos Otis	Kansas City Royals	330	10	5	4	.986	
1973	Mickey Stanley	Detroit Tigers	421	10	3	3	.993	
1974	Paul Blair	Baltimore Orioles	447	7	7	2	.985	
1974	Amos Otis	Kansas City Royals	422	8	6	3	.986	
1974	Joe Rudi	Oakland Athletics	238	7	4	0	.984	
1975	Paul Blair	Baltimore Orioles	327	8	3	1	.991	
1975	Fred Lynn	Boston Red Sox	404	11	7	1	.983	
1975	Joe Rudi	Oakland Athletics	72	1	0	1	1.000	
1976	Dwight Evans	Boston Red Sox	324	15	2	4	.994	
1976	Rick Manning	Cleveland Indians	361	8	5	1	.987	
1976	Joe Rudi	Oakland Athletics	258	6	3	2	.989	
1977	Juan Beníquez	Texas Rangers	311	10	4	1	.988	
1977	Al Cowens	Kansas City Royals	307	14	6	1	.982	
1977	Carl Yastrzemski^{†}	Boston Red Sox	287	16	0	1	1.000	
1978	Dwight Evans	Boston Red Sox	305	14	6	2	.982	
1978	Fred Lynn	Boston Red Sox	408	11	7	2	.984	
1978	Rick Miller	California Angels	353	9	4	5	.989	
1979	Dwight Evans	Boston Red Sox	307	15	4	5	.988	
1979	Sixto Lezcano	Milwaukee Brewers	281	10	4	3	.986	
1979	Fred Lynn	Boston Red Sox	381	10	5	4	.987	
1980	Fred Lynn	Boston Red Sox	303	11	2	3	.994	
1980	Dwayne Murphy	Oakland Athletics	507	13	5	0	.990	
1980	Willie Wilson	Kansas City Royals	482	9	6	1	.988	
1981	Dwight Evans	Boston Red Sox	259	9	2	1	.993	
1981	Rickey Henderson^{†}	Oakland Athletics	323	7	7	0	.979	
1981	Dwayne Murphy	Oakland Athletics	329	6	5	0	.985	
1982	Dwight Evans	Boston Red Sox	346	9	10	3	.973	
1982	Dwayne Murphy	Oakland Athletics	452	14	8	3	.983	
1982	Dave Winfield^{†}	New York Yankees	281	16	8	2	.974	
1983	Dwight Evans	Boston Red Sox	222	6	3	1	.987	
1983	Dwayne Murphy	Oakland Athletics	365	7	8	0	.979	
1983	Dave Winfield^{†}	New York Yankees	313	5	7	2	.978	
1984	Dwight Evans	Boston Red Sox	315	9	2	3	.994	
1984	Dwayne Murphy	Oakland Athletics	474	14	6	2	.988	
1984	Dave Winfield^{†}	New York Yankees	306	3	2	1	.994	
1985^{§}	Dwight Evans	Boston Red Sox	294	9	3	1	.990	
1985^{§}	Dwayne Murphy	Oakland Athletics	434	5	5	1	.989	
1985^{§}	Gary Pettis	California Angels	368	13	4	5	.990	
1985^{§}	Dave Winfield^{†}	New York Yankees	316	13	3	3	.991	
1986	Jesse Barfield	Toronto Blue Jays	349	22	4	8	.989	
1986	Gary Pettis	California Angels	464	9	7	3	.985	
1986	Kirby Puckett^{†}	Minnesota Twins	427	7	6	3	.986	
1987	Jesse Barfield	Toronto Blue Jays	368	20	3	8	.992	
1987	Kirby Puckett^{†}	Minnesota Twins	342	9	5	2	.986	
1987	Dave Winfield^{†}	New York Yankees	253	6	3	1	.989	
1988	Gary Pettis	Detroit Tigers	359	5	5	0	.986	
1988	Kirby Puckett^{†}	Minnesota Twins	453	9	3	4	.994	
1988	Devon White	California Angels	364	7	9	2	.976	
1989	Gary Pettis	Detroit Tigers	327	1	4	0	.988	
1989	Kirby Puckett^{†}	Minnesota Twins	438	13	4	3	.991	
1989	Devon White	California Angels	431	10	5	3	.989	
1990	Ellis Burks	Boston Red Sox	325	7	2	0	.994	
1990	Ken Griffey Jr.^{†}	Seattle Mariners	330	8	7	1	.980	
1990	Gary Pettis	Texas Rangers	285	10	2	4	.993	
1991	Ken Griffey Jr.^{†}	Seattle Mariners	361	15	4	4	.989	
1991	Kirby Puckett^{†}	Minnesota Twins	373	13	6	5	.985	
1991	Devon White	Toronto Blue Jays	439	8	1	2	.998	
1992	Ken Griffey Jr.^{†}	Seattle Mariners	359	8	1	4	.997	
1992	Kirby Puckett^{†}	Minnesota Twins	395	9	3	3	.993	
1992	Devon White	Toronto Blue Jays	443	9	7	2	.985	
1993	Ken Griffey Jr.^{†}	Seattle Mariners	316	8	3	3	.991	
1993	Kenny Lofton	Cleveland Indians	402	11	9	3	.979	
1993	Devon White	Toronto Blue Jays	399	6	3	2	.993	
1994	Ken Griffey Jr.^{†}	Seattle Mariners	225	12	4	3	.983	
1994	Kenny Lofton	Cleveland Indians	276	13	2	3	.993	
1994	Devon White	Toronto Blue Jays	268	3	6	1	.978	
1995	Ken Griffey Jr.^{†}	Seattle Mariners	190	5	2	1	.990	
1995	Kenny Lofton	Cleveland Indians	248	11	8	3	.970	
1995	Devon White	Toronto Blue Jays	261	7	3	0	.989	
1996	Jay Buhner	Seattle Mariners	251	10	3	1	.989	
1996	Ken Griffey Jr.^{†}	Seattle Mariners	379	10	4	1	.990	
1996	Kenny Lofton	Cleveland Indians	376	13	10	3	.975	
1997	Jim Edmonds	Anaheim Angels	313	9	5	3	.985	
1997	Ken Griffey Jr.^{†}	Seattle Mariners	389	9	6	3	.985	
1997	Bernie Williams	New York Yankees	269	2	2	1	.993	
1998	Jim Edmonds	Anaheim Angels	393	10	5	1	.988	
1998	Ken Griffey Jr.^{†}	Seattle Mariners	413	11	5	3	.988	
1998	Bernie Williams	New York Yankees	299	4	3	0	.990	
1999	Shawn Green	Toronto Blue Jays	341	5	1	1	.997	
1999	Ken Griffey Jr.^{†}	Seattle Mariners	386	10	9	5	.978	
1999	Bernie Williams	New York Yankees	382	9	5	3	.987	
2000	Jermaine Dye	Kansas City Royals	363	17	6	6	.984	
2000	Darin Erstad	Anaheim Angels	352	9	3	2	.992	
2000	Bernie Williams	New York Yankees	353	2	0	1	1.000	
2001	Mike Cameron	Seattle Mariners	411	8	6	2	.986	
2001	Torii Hunter	Minnesota Twins	460	14	4	3	.992	
2001	Ichiro Suzuki^{†}	Seattle Mariners	335	8	1	2	.997	
2002	Darin Erstad	Anaheim Angels	452	11	1	3	.998	
2002	Torii Hunter	Minnesota Twins	364	7	3	0	.992	
2002	Ichiro Suzuki^{†}	Seattle Mariners	336	8	3	0	.991	
2003	Mike Cameron	Seattle Mariners	485	3	4	2	.992	
2003	Torii Hunter	Minnesota Twins	425	5	4	1	.991	
2003	Ichiro Suzuki^{†}	Seattle Mariners	337	12	2	4	.994	
2004	Torii Hunter	Minnesota Twins	311	5	4	0	.988	
2004	Ichiro Suzuki^{†}	Seattle Mariners	372	12	3	2	.992	
2004	Vernon Wells	Toronto Blue Jays	327	5	1	0	.997	
2005	Torii Hunter	Minnesota Twins	218	9	3	4	.987	
2005	Ichiro Suzuki^{†}	Seattle Mariners	381	10	2	2	.995	
2005	Vernon Wells	Toronto Blue Jays	351	12	0	4	1.000	
2006	Torii Hunter	Minnesota Twins	343	8	4	4	.989	
2006	Ichiro Suzuki^{†}	Seattle Mariners	364	9	3	3	.992	
2006	Vernon Wells	Toronto Blue Jays	332	4	4	3	.988	
2007	Torii Hunter	Minnesota Twins	387	5	2	0	.995	
2007	Grady Sizemore	Cleveland Indians	399	4	2	2	.995	
2007	Ichiro Suzuki^{†}	Seattle Mariners	424	8	1	3	.998	
2008	Torii Hunter	Los Angeles Angels of Anaheim	350	4	0	0	1.000	
2008	Grady Sizemore	Cleveland Indians	382	2	2	1	.995	
2008	Ichiro Suzuki^{†}	Seattle Mariners	370	11	5	2	.987	
2009	Torii Hunter	Los Angeles Angels of Anaheim	308	2	1	0	.997	
2009	Adam Jones	Baltimore Orioles	349	9	5	1	.986	
2009	Ichiro Suzuki^{†}	Seattle Mariners	317	5	4	2	.988	
2010	Carl Crawford	Tampa Bay Rays	306	7	2	0	.994	
2010	Franklin Gutiérrez	Seattle Mariners	413	2	0	0	1.000	
2010	Ichiro Suzuki^{†}	Seattle Mariners	354	7	4	1	.989	
2011	Alex Gordon – LF	Kansas City Royals	336	23	4	5	.989	
2011	Jacoby Ellsbury – CF	Boston Red Sox	388	6	0	3	1.000	
2011	Nick Markakis – RF	Baltimore Orioles	326	15	0	5	1.000	
2012	Alex Gordon – LF	Kansas City Royals	319	17	2	3	.994	
2012	Adam Jones – CF	Baltimore Orioles	439	7	8	0	.982	
2012	Josh Reddick – RF	Oakland Athletics	310	15	6	3	.982	
2013	Alex Gordon – LF	Kansas City Royals	323	17	1	2	.997	
2013	Adam Jones – CF	Baltimore Orioles	352	11	2	0	.995	
2013	Shane Victorino – RF	Boston Red Sox	296	10	3	3	.990	
2014	Alex Gordon – LF	Kansas City Royals	341	8	2	0	.994	
2014	Adam Jones – CF	Baltimore Orioles	374	7	6	3	.984	
2014	Nick Markakis – RF	Baltimore Orioles	318	12	0	2	1.000	
2015	Yoenis Céspedes – LF	Detroit Tigers	204	9	5	1	.977	
2015	Kevin Kiermaier – CF	Tampa Bay Rays	412	15	5	3	.988	
2015	Kole Calhoun – RF	Los Angeles Angels of Anaheim	343	11	4	1	.989	
2016	Brett Gardner – LF	New York Yankees	250	9	3	2	.989	
2016	Kevin Kiermaier – CF	Tampa Bay Rays	264	7	2	1	.993	
2016	Mookie Betts – RF	Boston Red Sox	346	14	1	4	.997	
2017	Alex Gordon – LF	Kansas City Royals	259	8	2	0	.993	
2017	Byron Buxton – CF	Minnesota Twins	389	6	5	1	.988	
2017	Mookie Betts – RF	Boston Red Sox	366	8	5	1	.987	
2018	Alex Gordon – LF	Kansas City Royals	249	9	2	1	.992	
2018	Jackie Bradley Jr. – CF	Boston Red Sox	299	9	5	3	.984	
2018	Mookie Betts – RF	Boston Red Sox	241	4	1	0	.996	
2019	Alex Gordon – LF	Kansas City Royals	268	7	1	2	.996	
2019	Kevin Kiermaier – CF	Tampa Bay Rays	250	6	4	0	.985	
2019	Mookie Betts – RF	Boston Red Sox	274	8	1	0	.996	
2020	Alex Gordon – LF	Kansas City Royals	81	4	0	1	1.000	
2020	Luis Robert Jr. – CF	Chicago White Sox	151	2	1	0	.994	
2020	Joey Gallo – RF	Texas Rangers	120	3	0	1	1.000	
2021	Andrew Benintendi – LF	Kansas City Royals	225	6	3	1	.987	
2021	Michael A. Taylor – CF	Kansas City Royals	351	11	3	3	.992	
2021	Joey Gallo – RF	Texas Rangers; New York Yankees	192	9	4	3	.980	
2022	Steven Kwan – LF	Cleveland Guardians	224	7	2	2	.991	
2022	Myles Straw – CF	Cleveland Guardians	371	12	2	2	.995	
2022	Kyle Tucker – RF	Houston Astros	287	8	3	1	.990	
2023	Steven Kwan – LF	Cleveland Guardians	344	10	4	2	.989	
2023	Kevin Kiermaier – CF	Toronto Blue Jays	257	5	3	2	.989	
2023	Adolis García – RF	Texas Rangers	283	11	5	1	.983	
2024	Steven Kwan – LF	Cleveland Guardians	205	9	1	3	.995	
2024	Daulton Varsho – CF	Toronto Blue Jays	202	4	1	0	.995	
2024	Wilyer Abreu – RF	Boston Red Sox	212	9	7	2	.969	
2025	Steven Kwan – LF	Cleveland Guardians	308	13	8	2	.976	
2025	Ceddanne Rafaela – CF	Boston Red Sox	319	8	5	0	.985	
2025	Wilyer Abreu – RF	Boston Red Sox	215	7	5	3	.978	
2026	Cody Bellinger – LF	New York Yankees	237	8	3	2	.988	
2026	Ceddanne Rafaela – CF	Boston Red Sox	342	8	2	2	.994	
2026	Wilyer Abreu – RF	Boston Red Sox	290	13	9	2	.971	

== National League winners ==
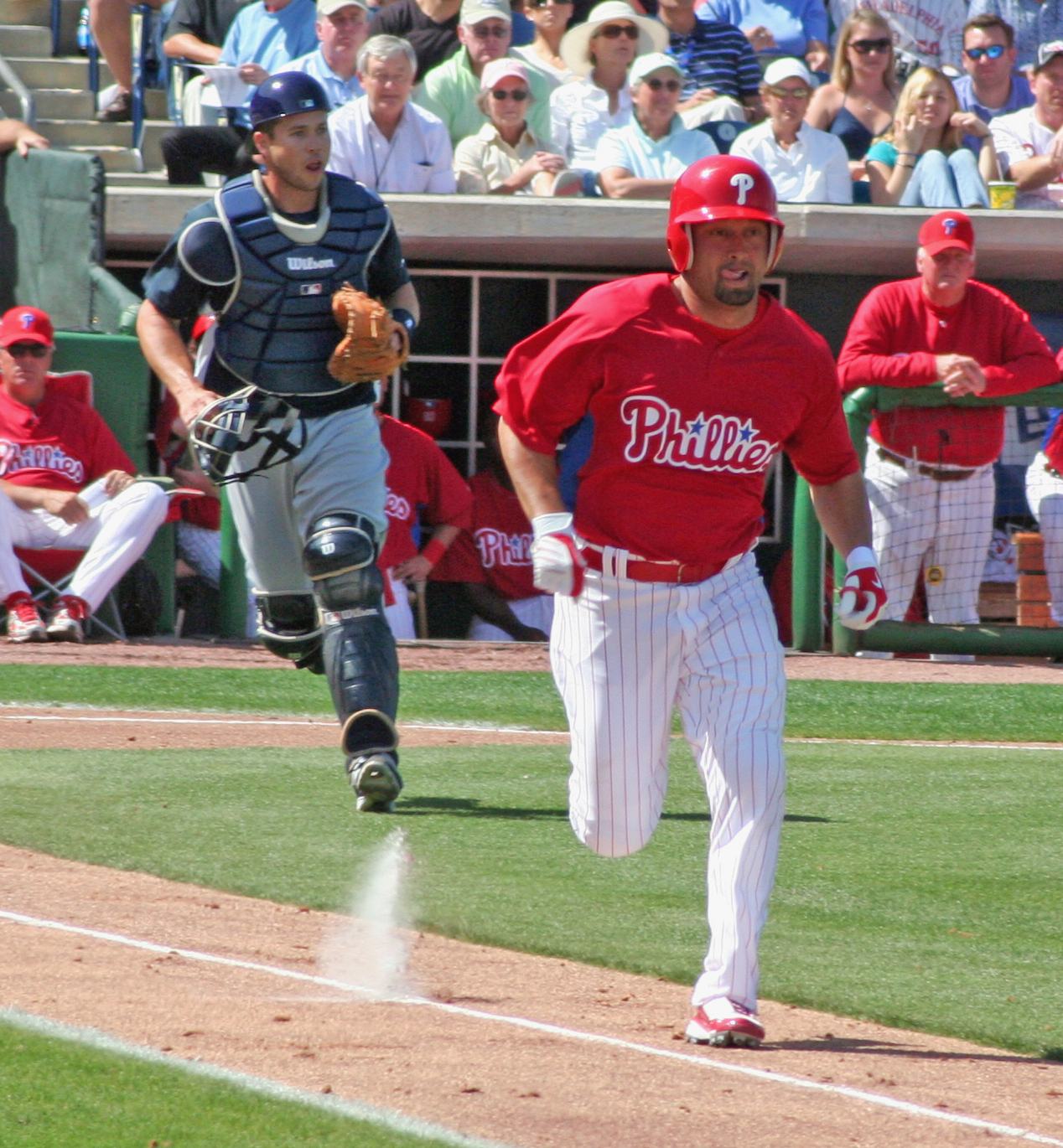
Shane Victorino (NL Gold Glove winner, 2008–2010)

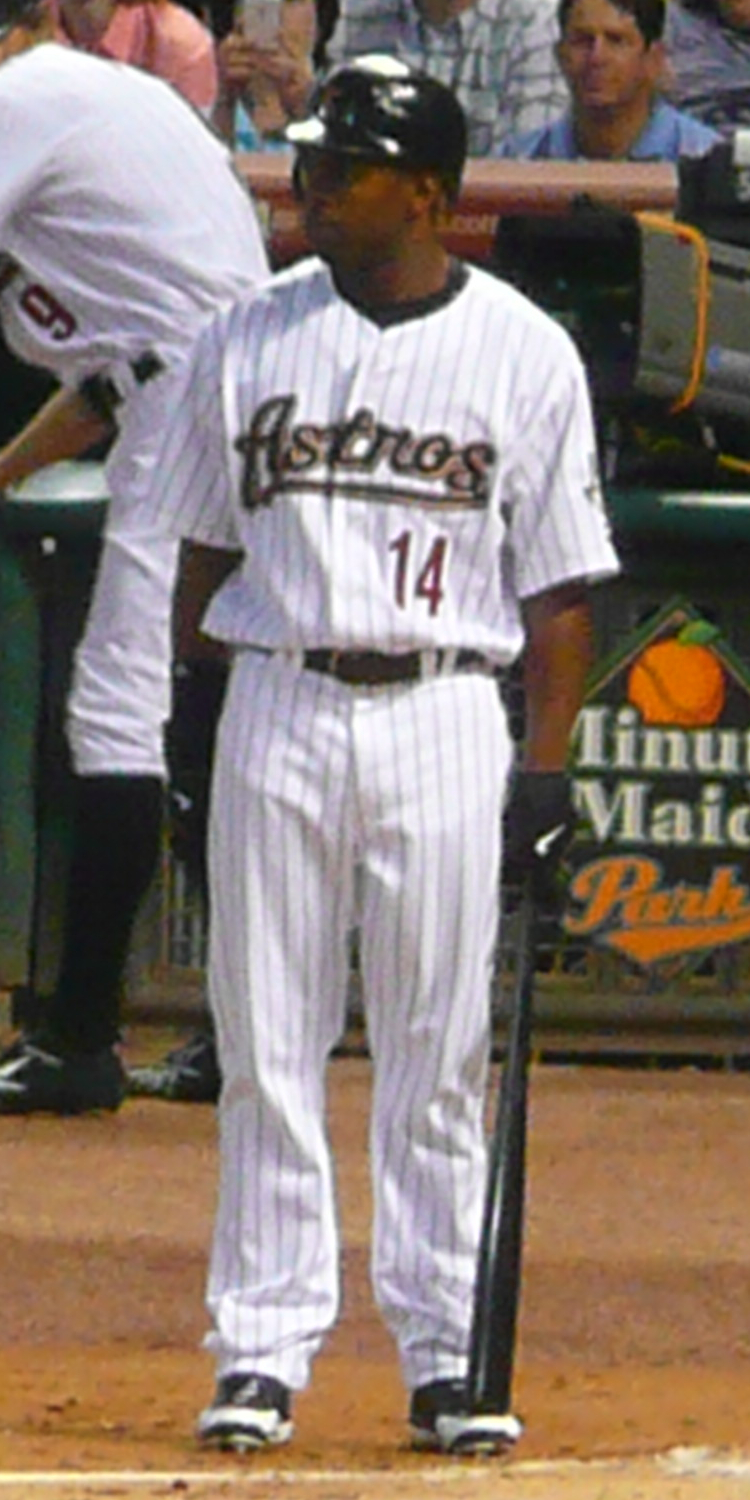
Michael Bourn (NL Gold Glove winner, 2009–2010)

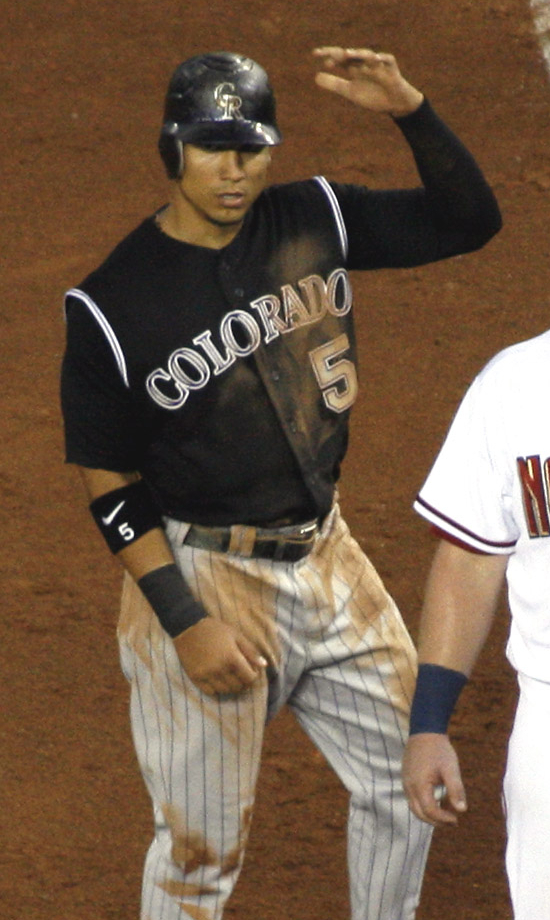
Carlos González (NL Gold Glove winner, 2010)

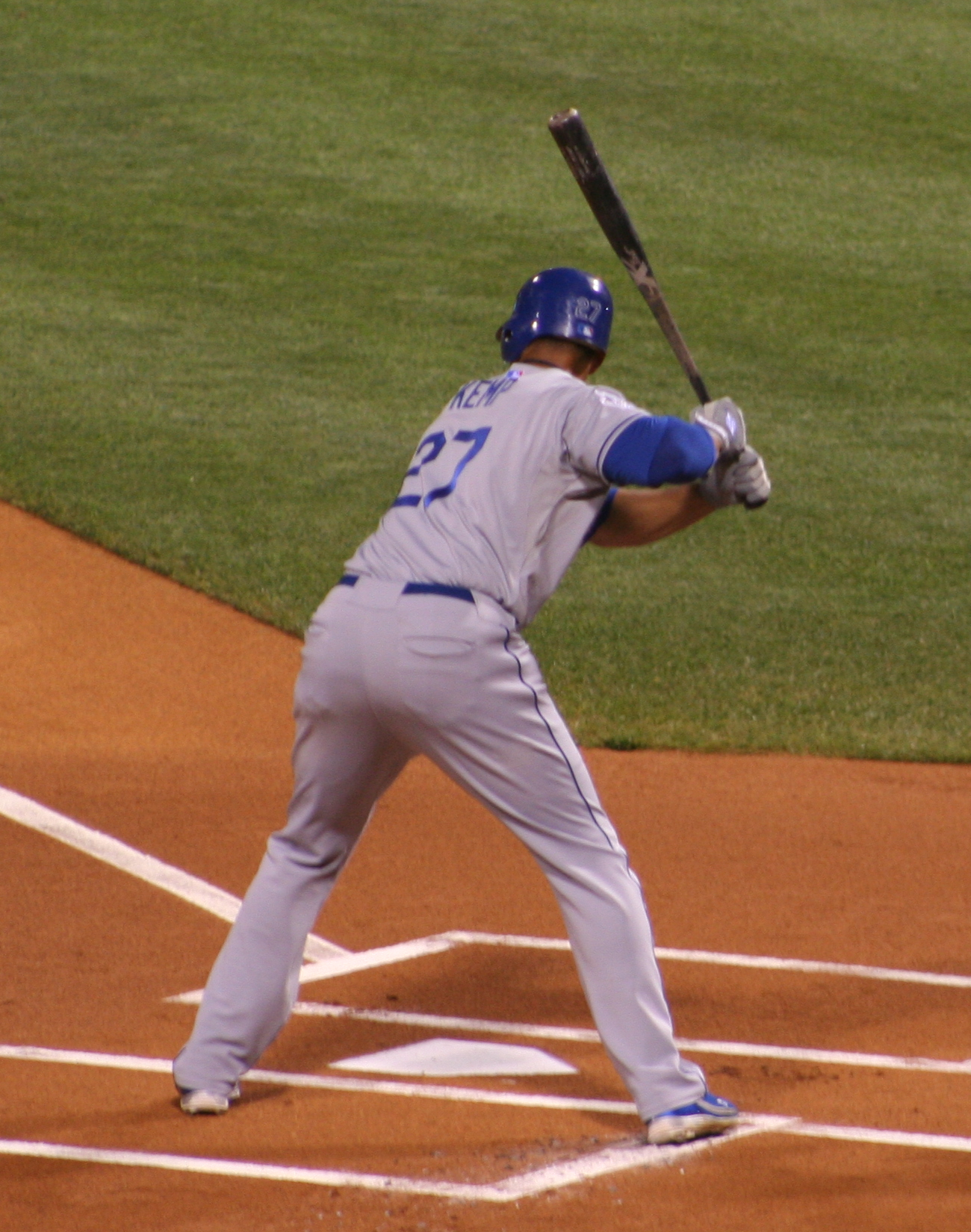
Matt Kemp (NL Gold Glove winner, 2009)

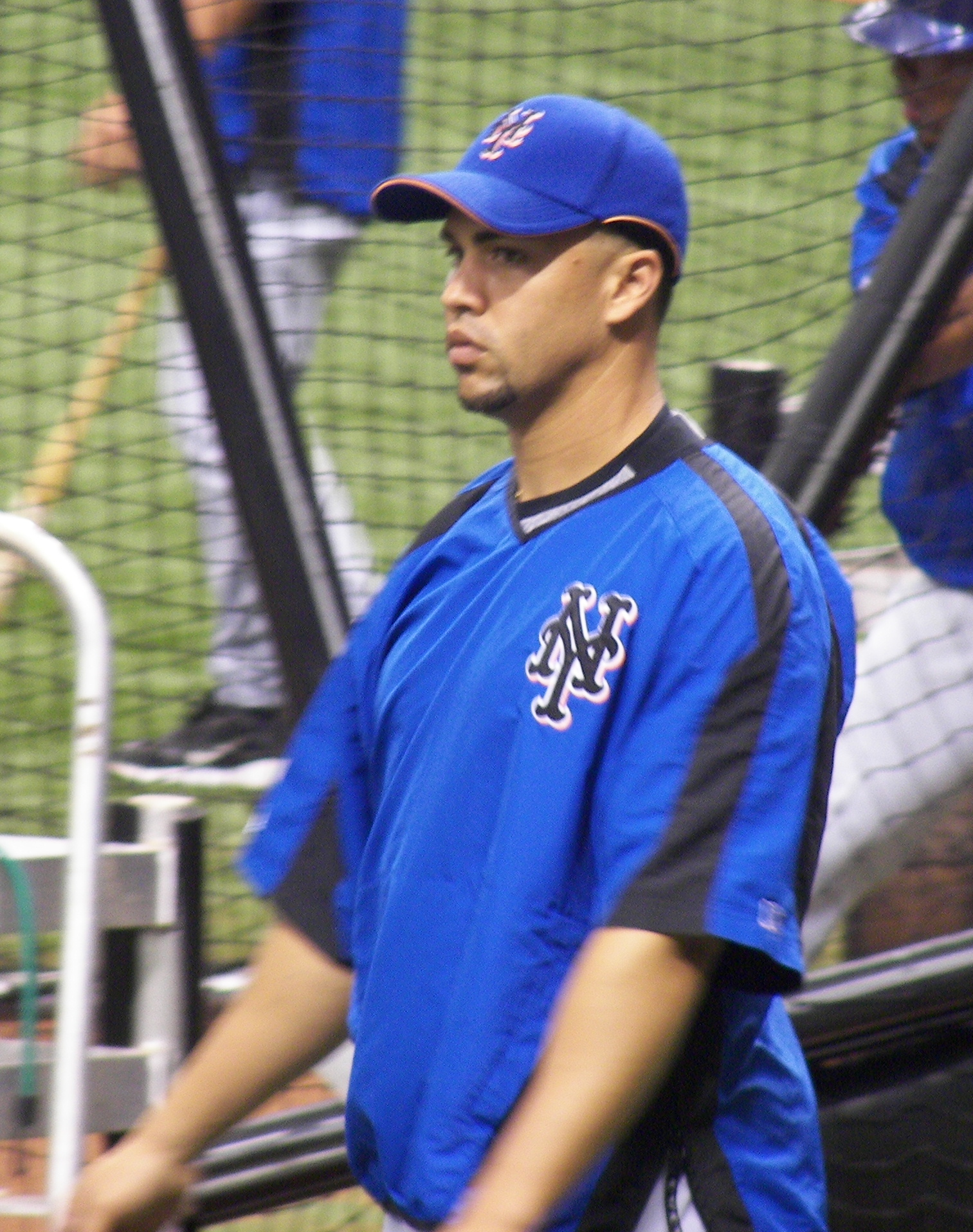
Carlos Beltrán (NL Gold Glove winner, 2006–2008)

Year	Player	Team	PO	A	E	DP	FPct	Ref
1957	Al Kaline^{†}	Detroit Tigers (AL)	319	13	5	2	.985	
1957	Willie Mays**^{†}	New York Giants	419	14	9	4	.980	
1957	Minnie Miñoso^{†}	Chicago White Sox (AL)	295	9	5	2	.984	
1958	Hank Aaron^{†}	Milwaukee Braves	305	12	5	0	.984	
1958	Frank Robinson^{†}	Cincinnati Reds	310	12	3	1	.991	
1958	Willie Mays**^{†}	San Francisco Giants	429	17	9	2	.980	
1959	Hank Aaron^{†}	Milwaukee Braves	261	12	5	3	.982	
1959	Jackie Brandt	San Francisco Giants	176	10	3	2	.984	
1959	Willie Mays**^{†}	San Francisco Giants	353	6	6	2	.984	
1960	Hank Aaron^{†}	Milwaukee Braves	320	13	6	6	.982	
1960	Wally Moon	Los Angeles Dodgers	194	15	3	3	.986	
1960	Willie Mays**^{†}	San Francisco Giants	392	12	8	2	.981	
1961	Roberto Clemente**^{†}	Pittsburgh Pirates	256	27	9	5	.969	
1961	Willie Mays**^{†}	San Francisco Giants	385	7	8	3	.980	
1961	Vada Pinson	Cincinnati Reds	396	19	10	4	.976	
1962	Roberto Clemente**^{†}	Pittsburgh Pirates	270	20	8	1	.973	
1962	Willie Mays**^{†}	San Francisco Giants	429	6	4	1	.991	
1962	Bill Virdon	Pittsburgh Pirates	348	11	9	0	.976	
1963	Roberto Clemente**^{†}	Pittsburgh Pirates	239	11	11	2	.958	
1963	Curt Flood	St. Louis Cardinals	403	12	5	2	.988	
1963	Willie Mays**^{†}	San Francisco Giants	398	8	8	1	.981	
1964	Roberto Clemente**^{†}	Pittsburgh Pirates	289	13	10	2	.968	
1964	Curt Flood	St. Louis Cardinals	391	10	5	2	.988	
1964	Willie Mays**^{†}	San Francisco Giants	370	10	6	4	.984	
1965	Roberto Clemente**^{†}	Pittsburgh Pirates	288	16	10	1	.968	
1965	Curt Flood	St. Louis Cardinals	349	7	5	3	.986	
1965	Willie Mays**^{†}	San Francisco Giants	337	13	6	4	.983	
1966	Roberto Clemente**^{†}	Pittsburgh Pirates	318	17	12	3	.965	
1966	Curt Flood	St. Louis Cardinals	394	5	0	1	1.000	
1966	Willie Mays**^{†}	San Francisco Giants	370	8	7	2	.982	
1967	Roberto Clemente**^{†}	Pittsburgh Pirates	273	17	9	4	.970	
1967	Curt Flood	St. Louis Cardinals	315	4	4	1	.988	
1967	Willie Mays**^{†}	San Francisco Giants	278	3	7	0	.976	
1968	Roberto Clemente**^{†}	Pittsburgh Pirates	297	9	5	1	.984	
1968	Curt Flood	St. Louis Cardinals	384	11	7	4	.983	
1968	Willie Mays**^{†}	San Francisco Giants	302	7	7	2	.978	
1969	Roberto Clemente**^{†}	Pittsburgh Pirates	226	14	5	1	.980	
1969	Curt Flood	St. Louis Cardinals	366	12	4	2	.990	
1969	Pete Rose	Cincinnati Reds	316	10	4	3	.988	
1970	Tommie Agee	New York Mets	374	4	13	3	.967	
1970	Roberto Clemente**^{†}	Pittsburgh Pirates	189	12	7	2	.966	
1970	Pete Rose	Cincinnati Reds	309	8	1	2	.997	
1971	Bobby Bonds	San Francisco Giants	329	10	2	1	.994	
1971	Roberto Clemente**^{†}	Pittsburgh Pirates	269	11	2	4	.993	
1971	Willie Davis	Los Angeles Dodgers	404	7	8	0	.981	
1972	César Cedeño	Houston Astros	345	9	7	1	.981	
1972	Roberto Clemente**^{†}	Pittsburgh Pirates	199	5	0	2	1.000	
1972	Willie Davis	Los Angeles Dodgers	373	10	5	1	.987	
1973	Bobby Bonds	San Francisco Giants	347	12	11	5	.970	
1973	César Cedeño	Houston Astros	357	10	7	2	.981	
1973	Willie Davis	Los Angeles Dodgers	344	6	7	0	.980	
1974	Bobby Bonds	San Francisco Giants	305	11	11	3	.966	
1974	César Cedeño	Houston Astros	446	11	3	4	.993	
1974	César Gerónimo	Cincinnati Reds	363	12	5	2	.987	
1975	César Cedeño	Houston Astros	322	8	6	2	.982	
1975	César Gerónimo	Cincinnati Reds	408	12	3	5	.993	
1975	Garry Maddox	San Francisco Giants; Philadelphia Phillies	325	13	5	4	.985	
1976	César Cedeño	Houston Astros	379	11	8	5	.980	
1976	César Gerónimo	Cincinnati Reds	390	4	6	2	.985	
1976	Garry Maddox	Philadelphia Phillies	325	13	5	4	.985	
1977	César Gerónimo	Cincinnati Reds	375	9	3	2	.992	
1977	Garry Maddox	Philadelphia Phillies	385	7	9	2	.978	
1977	Dave Parker^{†}	Pittsburgh Pirates	389	26	15	9	.965	
1978	Garry Maddox	Philadelphia Phillies	444	7	8	1	.983	
1978	Dave Parker^{†}	Pittsburgh Pirates	302	12	13	3	.960	
1978	Ellis Valentine	Montreal Expos	288	25	10	3	.969	
1979	Garry Maddox	Philadelphia Phillies	433	13	2	2	.996	
1979	Dave Parker^{†}	Pittsburgh Pirates	343	16	15	2	.960	
1979	Dave Winfield^{†}	San Diego Padres	350	14	5	3	.986	
1980	Andre Dawson^{†}	Montreal Expos	403	13	6	3	.986	
1980	Garry Maddox	Philadelphia Phillies	405	7	10	0	.976	
1980	Dave Winfield^{†}	San Diego Padres	273	20	4	4	.987	
1981	Dusty Baker	Los Angeles Dodgers	181	8	2	1	.990	
1981	Andre Dawson^{†}	Montreal Expos	327	10	7	1	.980	
1981	Garry Maddox	Philadelphia Phillies	252	8	6	4	.977	
1982	Andre Dawson^{†}	Montreal Expos	419	8	8	2	.982	
1982	Garry Maddox	Philadelphia Phillies	254	8	2	4	.992	
1982	Dale Murphy	Atlanta Braves	407	6	9	2	.979	
1983	Andre Dawson^{†}	Montreal Expos	438	6	9	2	.982	
1983	Willie McGee	St. Louis Cardinals	387	7	5	1	.987	
1983	Dale Murphy	Atlanta Braves	373	10	6	0	.985	
1984	Andre Dawson^{†}	Montreal Expos	297	11	8	2	.975	
1984	Bob Dernier	Chicago Cubs	355	5	5	1	.986	
1984	Dale Murphy	Atlanta Braves	369	10	5	1	.987	
1985	Andre Dawson^{†}	Montreal Expos	248	9	7	1	.973	
1985	Willie McGee	St. Louis Cardinals	382	11	9	2	.978	
1985	Dale Murphy	Atlanta Braves	337	8	7	4	.980	
1986	Tony Gwynn^{†}	San Diego Padres	337	19	4	3	.989	
1986	Willie McGee	St. Louis Cardinals	325	8	3	0	.991	
1986	Dale Murphy	Atlanta Braves	303	7	6	1	.981	
1987	Eric Davis	Cincinnati Reds	380	10	4	4	.990	
1987	Andre Dawson^{†}	Chicago Cubs	271	12	4	0	.986	
1987	Tony Gwynn^{†}	San Diego Padres	298	13	6	1	.981	
1988	Eric Davis	Cincinnati Reds	300	2	6	0	.981	
1988	Andre Dawson^{†}	Chicago Cubs	269	7	3	1	.989	
1988	Andy Van Slyke	Pittsburgh Pirates	406	12	4	2	.991	
1989	Eric Davis	Cincinnati Reds	298	2	5	1	.984	
1989	Tony Gwynn^{†}	San Diego Padres	353	13	6	1	.984	
1989	Andy Van Slyke	Pittsburgh Pirates	339	9	4	5	.989	
1990	Barry Bonds	Pittsburgh Pirates	338	14	6	2	.983	
1990	Tony Gwynn^{†}	San Diego Padres	328	11	5	2	.985	
1990	Andy Van Slyke	Pittsburgh Pirates	330	6	8	0	.977	
1991	Barry Bonds	Pittsburgh Pirates	321	13	3	1	.991	
1991	Tony Gwynn^{†}	San Diego Padres	291	8	3	2	.990	
1991	Andy Van Slyke	Pittsburgh Pirates	273	8	1	1	.996	
1992	Barry Bonds	Pittsburgh Pirates	310	4	3	0	.991	
1992	Andy Van Slyke	Pittsburgh Pirates	421	11	5	3	.989	
1992	Larry Walker^{†}	Montreal Expos	269	16	2	3	.993	
1993	Barry Bonds	San Francisco Giants	310	7	5	0	.984	
1993	Marquis Grissom	Montreal Expos	416	8	7	3	.984	
1993	Larry Walker^{†}	Montreal Expos	273	13	6	2	.979	
1994	Barry Bonds	San Francisco Giants	198	10	3	2	.986	
1994	Darren Lewis	San Francisco Giants	284	5	2	1	.993	
1994	Marquis Grissom	Montreal Expos	322	7	5	0	.985	
1995	Steve Finley	San Diego Padres	292	8	7	0	.977	
1995	Marquis Grissom	Atlanta Braves	310	9	2	1	.994	
1995	Raúl Mondesí	Los Angeles Dodgers	282	16	6	3	.980	
1996	Barry Bonds	San Francisco Giants	289	11	6	1	.980	
1996	Steve Finley	San Diego Padres	386	7	7	2	.983	
1996	Marquis Grissom	Atlanta Braves	338	10	1	1	.997	
1997	Barry Bonds	San Francisco Giants	290	10	5	1	.984	
1997	Raúl Mondesí	Los Angeles Dodgers	336	10	4	0	.989	
1997	Larry Walker^{†}	Colorado Rockies	235	12	2	4	.992	
1998	Barry Bonds	San Francisco Giants	302	2	5	0	.984	
1998	Andruw Jones^{†}	Atlanta Braves	413	20	2	6	.995	
1998	Larry Walker^{†}	Colorado Rockies	237	8	4	2	.984	
1999	Steve Finley	Arizona Diamondbacks	398	5	2	0	.995	
1999	Andruw Jones^{†}	Atlanta Braves	493	13	10	1	.981	
1999	Larry Walker^{†}	Colorado Rockies	204	13	4	3	.982	
2000	Jim Edmonds	St. Louis Cardinals	353	9	4	2	.989	
2000	Steve Finley	Arizona Diamondbacks	344	10	3	2	.992	
2000	Andruw Jones^{†}	Atlanta Braves	439	10	2	2	.996	
2001	Jim Edmonds	St. Louis Cardinals	311	12	6	1	.982	
2001	Andruw Jones^{†}	Atlanta Braves	461	10	6	6	.987	
2001	Larry Walker^{†}	Colorado Rockies	243	8	4	4	.984	
2002	Jim Edmonds	St. Louis Cardinals	347	11	5	4	.986	
2002	Andruw Jones^{†}	Atlanta Braves	406	5	3	1	.993	
2002	Larry Walker^{†}	Colorado Rockies	230	14	4	5	.984	
2003	José Cruz Jr.	San Francisco Giants	341	18	2	7	.994	
2003	Jim Edmonds	St. Louis Cardinals	335	12	5	5	.986	
2003	Andruw Jones^{†}	Atlanta Braves	390	8	3	1	.993	
2004	Jim Edmonds	St. Louis Cardinals	314	11	4	2	.988	
2004	Steve Finley	Arizona Diamondbacks; Los Angeles Dodgers	359	5	3	3	.992	
2004	Andruw Jones^{†}	Atlanta Braves	389	10	3	2	.993	
2005	Bobby Abreu	Philadelphia Phillies	266	7	4	0	.986	
2005	Jim Edmonds	St. Louis Cardinals	318	6	2	1	.994	
2005	Andruw Jones^{†}	Atlanta Braves	365	11	2	1	.995	
2006	Carlos Beltrán^{†}	New York Mets	357	13	2	6	.995	
2006	Mike Cameron	San Diego Padres	367	6	6	2	.984	
2006	Andruw Jones^{†}	Atlanta Braves	378	4	2	1	.995	
2007^{§}	Carlos Beltrán^{†}	New York Mets	389	6	5	2	.988	
2007^{§}	Jeff Francoeur	Atlanta Braves	327	19	5	2	.986	
2007^{§}	Andruw Jones^{†}	Atlanta Braves	396	3	2	1	.995	
2007^{§}	Aaron Rowand	Philadelphia Phillies	392	11	2	2	.995	
2008	Carlos Beltrán^{†}	New York Mets	418	8	3	1	.993	
2008	Nate McLouth	Pittsburgh Pirates	384	5	1	1	.997	
2008	Shane Victorino	Philadelphia Phillies	328	7	2	2	.994	
2009	Michael Bourn	Houston Astros	371	11	3	0	.992	
2009	Matt Kemp	Los Angeles Dodgers	377	14	2	4	.995	
2009	Shane Victorino	Philadelphia Phillies	336	8	1	1	.997	
2010	Michael Bourn	Houston Astros	359	8	3	2	.992	
2010	Carlos González	Colorado Rockies	259	8	1	1	.996	
2010	Shane Victorino	Philadelphia Phillies	360	11	2	4	.995	
2011	Gerardo Parra – LF	Arizona Diamondbacks	288	12	3	5	.990	
2011	Matt Kemp – CF	Los Angeles Dodgers	345	11	5	5	.986	
2011	Andre Ethier – RF	Los Angeles Dodgers	243	8	0	0	1.000	
2012	Carlos González – LF	Colorado Rockies	207	7	4	0	.982	
2012	Andrew McCutchen – CF	Pittsburgh Pirates	367	3	1	1	.997	
2012	Jason Heyward – RF	Atlanta Braves	335	11	5	4	.986	
2013	Carlos González – LF	Colorado Rockies	172	11	3	0	.984	
2013	Carlos Gómez – CF	Milwaukee Brewers	391	12	5	2	.988	
2013	Gerardo Parra – RF	Arizona Diamondbacks	343	17	5	1	.986	
2014	Christian Yelich – LF	Miami Marlins	271	6	2	1	.993	
2014	Juan Lagares – CF	New York Mets	293	6	5	0	.984	
2014	Jason Heyward – RF	Atlanta Braves	365	9	1	2	.997	
2015	Starling Marte – LF	Pittsburgh Pirates	205	16	2	1	.991	
2015	A. J. Pollock – CF	Arizona Diamondbacks	347	5	3	0	.992	
2015	Jason Heyward – RF	St. Louis Cardinals	290	10	3	3	.990	
2016	Starling Marte – LF	Pittsburgh Pirates	196	17	4	2	.982	
2016	Ender Inciarte – CF	Atlanta Braves	351	14	4	4	.989	
2016	Jason Heyward – RF	Chicago Cubs	269	5	2	2	.993	
2017	Marcell Ozuna – LF	Miami Marlins	305	10	5	0	.984	
2017	Ender Inciarte – CF	Atlanta Braves	410	7	3	0	.993	
2017	Jason Heyward – RF	Chicago Cubs	207	5	2	5	.991	
2018	Corey Dickerson – LF	Pittsburgh Pirates	255	7	1	4	.996	
2018	Ender Inciarte – CF	Atlanta Braves	380	6	5	3	.987	
2018	Nick Markakis – RF	Atlanta Braves	312	9	2	0	.994	
2019	David Peralta – LF	Arizona Diamondbacks	201	3	2	1	.990	
2019	Lorenzo Cain – CF	Milwaukee Brewers	306	5	2	1	.994	
2019	Cody Bellinger – RF	Los Angeles Dodgers	198	10	2	1	.990	
2020	Tyler O'Neill – LF	St. Louis Cardinals	89	0	0	0	1.000	
2020	Trent Grisham – CF	San Diego Padres	134	3	2	1	.986	
2020	Mookie Betts – RF	Los Angeles Dodgers	113	1	4	0	.966	
2021	Tyler O'Neill – LF	St. Louis Cardinals	221	7	9	1	.962	
2021	Harrison Bader – CF	St. Louis Cardinals	289	3	3	0	.990	
2021	Adam Duvall – RF	Miami Marlins; Atlanta Braves	122	7	1	1	.992	
2022	Ian Happ – LF	Chicago Cubs	274	8	3	1	.989	
2022	Trent Grisham – CF	San Diego Padres	341	3	2	1	.994	
2022	Mookie Betts – RF	Los Angeles Dodgers	298	8	2	4	.994	
2023	Ian Happ – LF	Chicago Cubs	253	12	3	4	.989	
2023	Brenton Doyle – CF	Colorado Rockies	373	10	1	3	.997	
2023	Fernando Tatis Jr. – RF	San Diego Padres	282	12	6	1	.980	
2024	Ian Happ – LF	Chicago Cubs	307	11	1	2	.997	
2024	Brenton Doyle – CF	Colorado Rockies	426	8	4	3	.991	
2024	Sal Frelick – RF	Milwaukee Brewers	195	6	2	1	.990	
2025	Ian Happ – LF	Chicago Cubs	300	5	1	0	.997	
2025	Pete Crow-Armstrong – CF	Chicago Cubs	427	5	2	2	.995	
2025	Fernando Tatis Jr. – RF	San Diego Padres	351	5	3	3	.992	
2026	Jackson Chourio – LF	Milwaukee Brewers	199	8	0	0	1.000	
2026	Pete Crow-Armstrong – CF	Chicago Cubs	393	5	6	1	.985	
2026	Corbin Carroll – RF	Arizona Diamondbacks	351	4	4	1	.989	
