= Fielding Bible Award =

Award for best defensive player for each fielding position in Major League Baseball

- Sport: Baseball
- League: Major League Baseball
- Awarded for: Best defensive player for each fielding position in the league
- Presented by: SIS (formerly Sports Info Solutions)

History
- First award: 2006
- Most wins: 7: Mookie Betts

A Fielding Bible Award recognizes the best defensive player for each fielding position in Major League Baseball (MLB) based on "statistical analysis, the eye test, and any other factors that [panelists] wish to utilize." John Dewan and SIS (formerly Sports Info Solutions, and earlier, Baseball Info Solutions) conduct the annual selection process, which commenced in 2006. The awards are voted on by a panel of 10 to 15 sabermetrically inclined journalists and bloggers. The awards have historically been announced before the Gold Glove Awards, the traditional measurement of fielding excellence. Dewan wrote that this award cannot equal the prestige of the Gold Glove, which started 50 years earlier, but it provides an alternative.

== Background ==
In 2006, John Dewan issued The Fielding Bible, a 241 page book, based on analysis of every ball put into play in during the 2005 season, resulting in rankings at each defensive position for all regular players in Major League Baseball (MLB). Dewan, with co-authors, has issued several additional volumes of the book, most recently The Fielding Bible, Volume V in 2020. Dewan and other panelists have annually gone through a ranking process for each defensive position, with the players judged to be the best at each position being named the Fielding Bible Award winners for the MLB season in question.

== Voting process ==
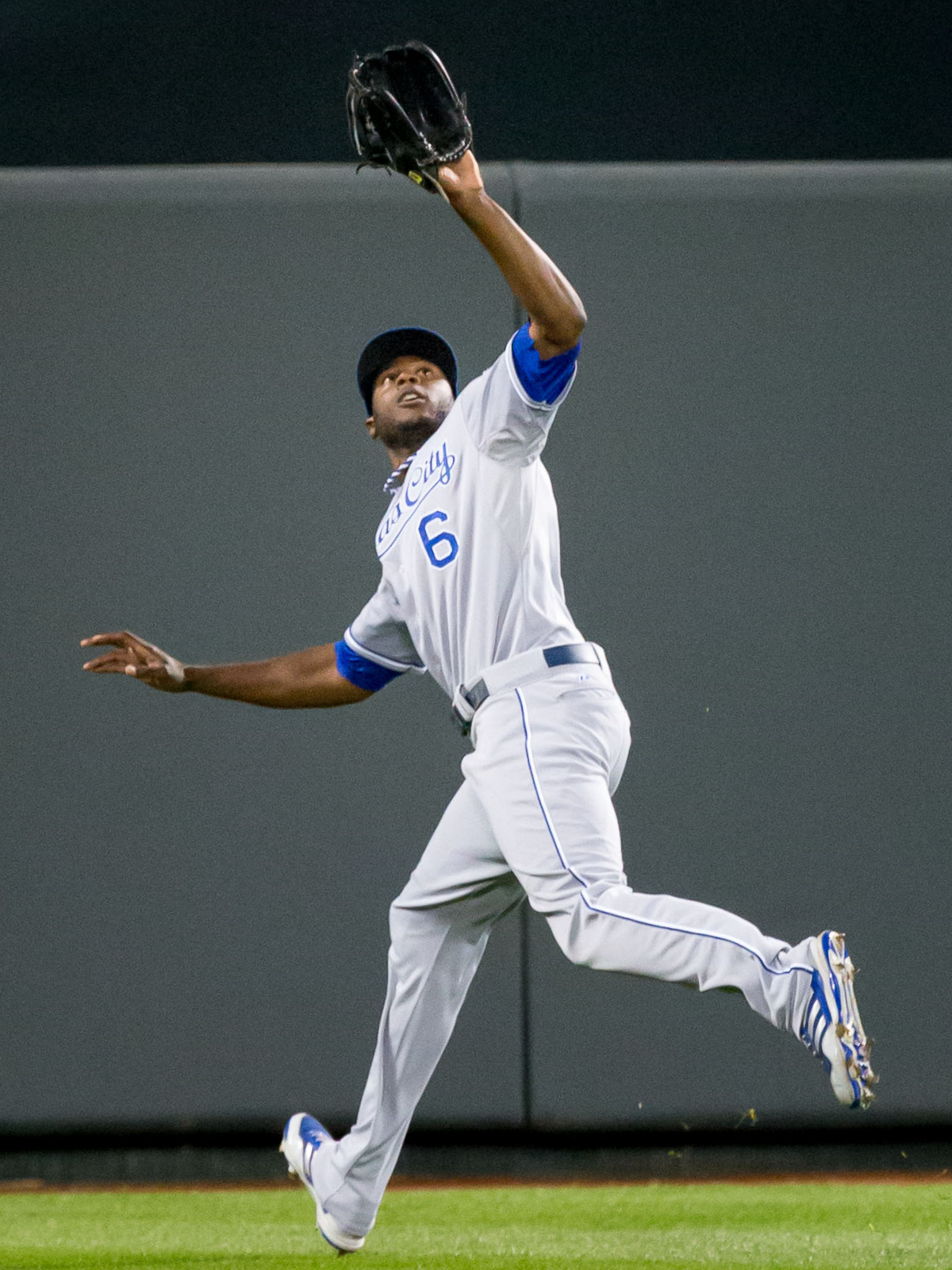
Lorenzo Cain was the first player recognized with a Fielding Bible Award in the multi-position category.

Dewan felt that statistics in addition to visual observation and subjective judgment are integral in determining the best defensive players. The Fielding Bible Award attempts to address the deficiencies Dewan saw with the Gold Glove Award, previously the only organized subjective judgment of fielding. The voting for the Fielding Bible Awards are for the entire MLB, and not separated between the National League and the American League; playing defense was not perceived to be any different between the two leagues. The voters select the best defensive player at each position with the best player given 10 points, the second best nine points and so forth. From the award's inception, the specific outfield positions have been picked individually instead of choosing three generic outfielders, a practice employed by the Gold Glove Awards from 1961 to 2010. Each voter selects 10 players for each position. The candidates for each position are defined beforehand to eliminate the possibility of a vote going to a player who was not really playing the position. (Rafael Palmeiro won a 1999 AL Gold Glove as a first baseman despite being primarily a designated hitter and appearing in only 28 games at first base that season.) The voting for awards is summarized and published for each position, identifying who each panelist voted for. This aims to instill accountability among the voters and provide insight into the process to the public.

In 2014, an award was added to honor a player who plays multiple positions (often referred to as a utility player), with a minimum of 600 innings played at any position but no more than 70 percent of those innings at a specific position. Beginning with the 2023 awards, the announced list of winners now also includes one player named as an overall Defensive Player of the Year.

Voters use sabermetrics to account for a defenders' range. The traditional standard of a high fielding percentage could be impacted by a player who does not make many errors but also does not get to many balls.

Members of the award's voting panel have included Dewan, sabermetric pioneer Bill James, and writers Peter Gammons, NBC Sports' Joe Posnanski, SB Nation editor Rob Neyer, and ESPN analyst Doug Glanville. The 2024 panel's 15 members included Tyler Kepner of The Athletic, Eduardo Pérez of ESPN, and Bobby Scales of the Detroit Tigers Radio Network.

== Critical reception ==
There have been some major differences between the player selections made for the Fielding Bible Awards and the Gold Glove Awards. The Boston Globe writer Peter Abraham said the Fielding Bible Awards "are far more accurate (and accountable)" than the Gold Glove awards since statistics are used along with the opinions of the expert panel. The Gold Gloves are selected by managers and coaches that may have seen a player as few as six times all season. Geoff Baker of The Seattle Times said the votes for the Gold Gloves rely largely on a player's past reputation. Jeff Wilson of The Southern Illinoisan believes that Gold Glove results are unduly influenced by a player's offensive prowess. Derek Jeter, winner of multiple Gold Gloves, believes that many defensive factors cannot be quantified. Rustin Dodd of The Kansas City Star noted that people "point out the primitive nature of defensive stats — even if that's more perception now than reality."

In 2013, Gold Glove organizers partnered with the Society for American Baseball Research (SABR) to add a sabermetric component to its vote. Afterwards, Jay Jaffe of Sports Illustrated wrote that the Gold Gloves "appear to have significantly closed the gap on their more statistically-driven counterparts."

== Past winners ==
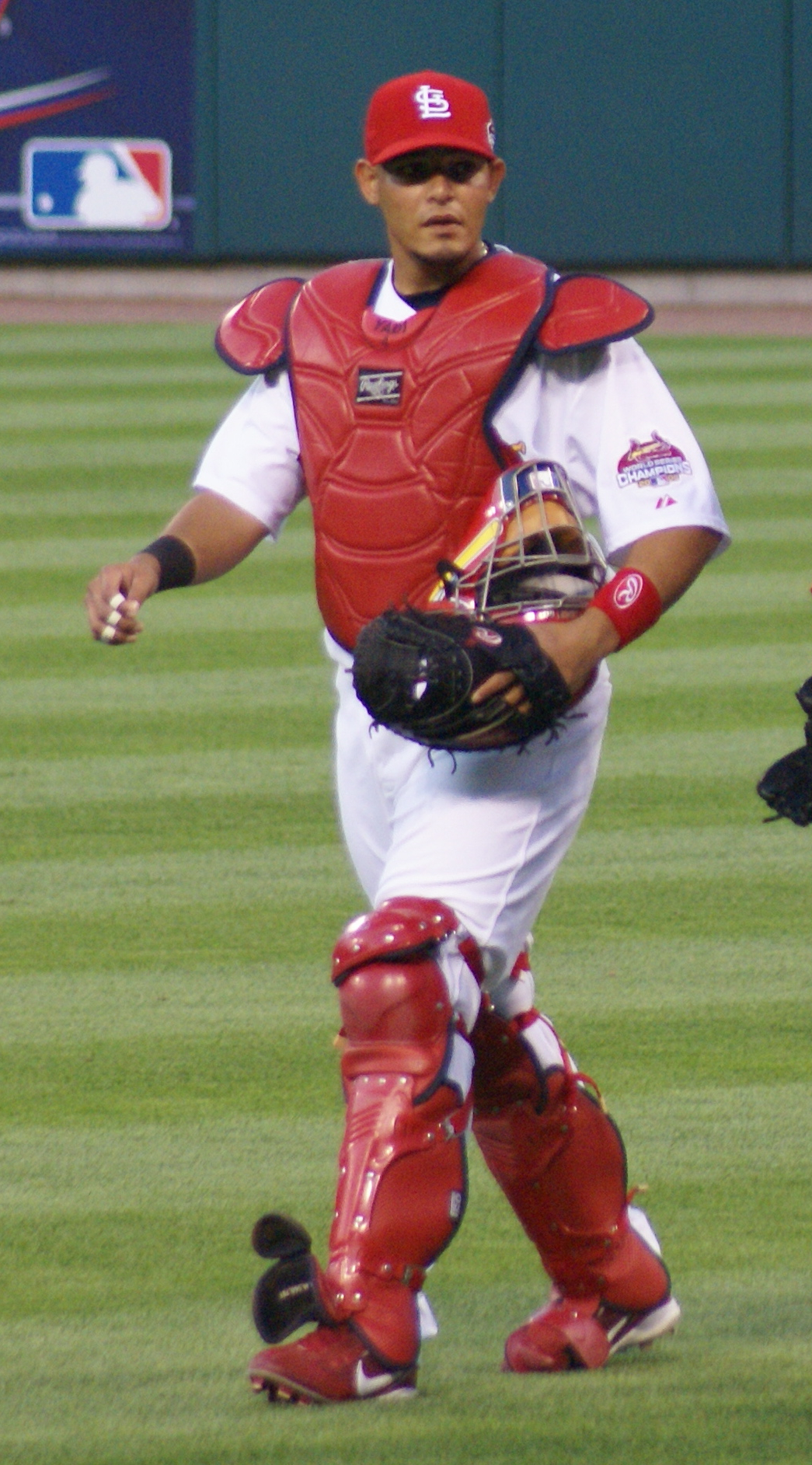
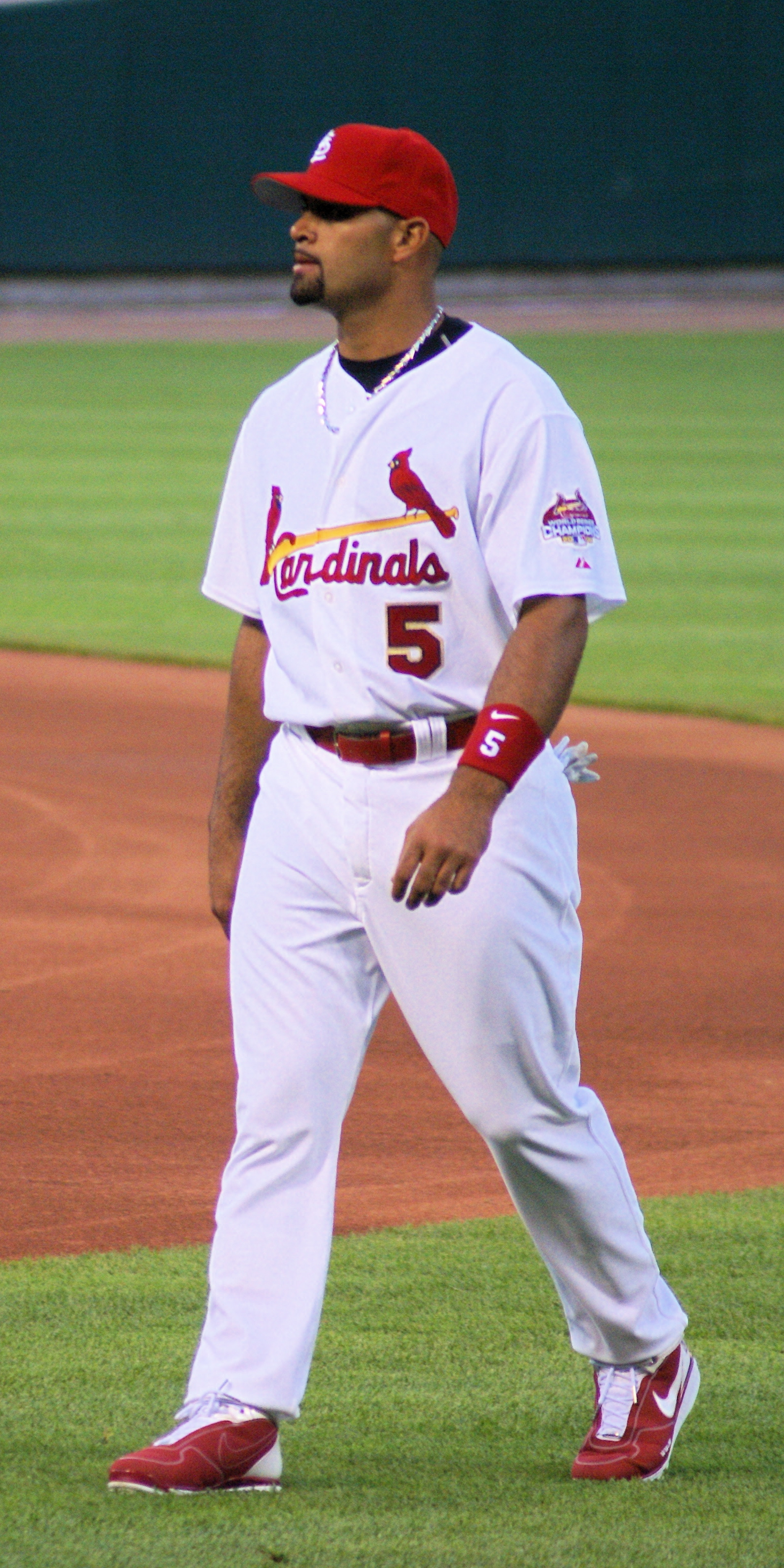
St. Louis Cardinals teammates Yadier Molina (left) and Albert Pujols (right) were frequent winners of the Fielding Bible Award.

Key
C	Catcher
1B	First baseman
2B	Second baseman
3B	Third baseman
SS	Shortstop
LF	Left fielder
CF	Center fielder
RF	Right fielder
P	Pitcher
MP	Multi-position
DPOY	Defensive Player of the Year
TEAM	Defensive Team of the Year
Name (#)	Name of winner (# times won if repeat winner)
†	Member of the National Baseball Hall of Fame and Museum

Year	C	1B	2B	3B	SS	LF	CF	RF	P	MP	DPOY	TEAM	Ref
2006	Iván Rodríguez^{†}	Albert Pujols	Orlando Hudson	Adrián Beltré^{†}	Adam Everett	Carl Crawford	Carlos Beltrán^{†}	Ichiro Suzuki^{†}	Greg Maddux^{†}	—N/a	—N/a	—N/a	
2007	Yadier Molina	Albert Pujols (2)	Aaron Hill	Pedro Feliz	Troy Tulowitzki	Eric Byrnes	Andruw Jones^{†}	Alex Ríos	Johan Santana	—N/a	—N/a	—N/a	
2008	Yadier Molina (2)	Albert Pujols (3)	Brandon Phillips	Adrián Beltré^{†} (2)	Jimmy Rollins	Carl Crawford (2)	Carlos Beltrán^{†} (2)	Franklin Gutiérrez	Kenny Rogers	—N/a	—N/a	—N/a	
2009	Yadier Molina (3)	Albert Pujols (4)	Aaron Hill (2)	Ryan Zimmerman	Jack Wilson	Carl Crawford (3)	Franklin Gutiérrez (2)	Ichiro Suzuki^{†} (2)	Mark Buehrle	—N/a	—N/a	—N/a	
2010	Yadier Molina (4)	Daric Barton	Chase Utley	Evan Longoria	Troy Tulowitzki (2)	Brett Gardner	Michael Bourn	Ichiro Suzuki^{†} (3)	Mark Buehrle (2)	—N/a	—N/a	—N/a	
2011	Matt Wieters	Albert Pujols (5)	Dustin Pedroia	Adrián Beltré^{†} (3)	Troy Tulowitzki (3)	Brett Gardner (2)	Austin Jackson	Justin Upton	Mark Buehrle (3)	—N/a	—N/a	—N/a	
2012	Yadier Molina (5)	Mark Teixeira	Darwin Barney	Adrián Beltré^{†} (4)	Brendan Ryan	Alex Gordon	Mike Trout	Jason Heyward	Mark Buehrle (4)	—N/a	—N/a	—N/a	
2013	Yadier Molina (6)	Paul Goldschmidt	Dustin Pedroia (2)	Manny Machado	Andrelton Simmons	Alex Gordon (2)	Carlos Gómez	Gerardo Parra	R. A. Dickey	—N/a	—N/a	—N/a	
2014	Jonathan Lucroy	Adrián González	Dustin Pedroia (3)	Josh Donaldson	Andrelton Simmons (2)	Alex Gordon (3)	Juan Lagares	Jason Heyward (2)	Dallas Keuchel	Lorenzo Cain	—N/a	—N/a	
2015	Buster Posey	Paul Goldschmidt (2)	Ian Kinsler	Nolan Arenado	Andrelton Simmons (3)	Starling Marte	Kevin Kiermaier	Jason Heyward (3)	Dallas Keuchel (2)	Ender Inciarte	—N/a	—N/a	
2016	Buster Posey (2)	Anthony Rizzo	Dustin Pedroia (4)	Nolan Arenado (2)	Andrelton Simmons (4)	Starling Marte (2)	Kevin Pillar	Mookie Betts	Dallas Keuchel (3)	Javier Báez	—N/a	—N/a	
2017	Martin Maldonado	Paul Goldschmidt (3)	DJ LeMahieu	Nolan Arenado (3)	Andrelton Simmons (5)	Brett Gardner (3)	Byron Buxton	Mookie Betts (2)	Dallas Keuchel (4)	Javier Báez (2)	—N/a	—N/a	
2018	Jeff Mathis	Matt Olson	Kolten Wong	Matt Chapman	Andrelton Simmons (6)	Alex Gordon (4)	Lorenzo Cain (2)	Mookie Betts (3)	Zack Greinke	Javier Báez (3)	—N/a	—N/a	
2019	Roberto Pérez	Matt Olson (2)	Kolten Wong (2)	Matt Chapman (2)	Nick Ahmed	David Peralta	Lorenzo Cain (3)	Cody Bellinger	Zack Greinke (2)	Cody Bellinger (2)	—N/a	—N/a	
2020	Roberto Pérez (2)	Matt Olson (3)	Kolten Wong (3)	Nolan Arenado (4)	Javier Báez (4)	Tyler O'Neill	Kevin Kiermaier (2)	Mookie Betts (4)	Max Fried	Kiké Hernández	—N/a	—N/a	
2021	Jacob Stallings	Paul Goldschmidt (4)	Whit Merrifield	Ke'Bryan Hayes	Carlos Correa	Tyler O'Neill (2)	Michael A. Taylor	Aaron Judge	Dallas Keuchel (5)	Kiké Hernández (2)	—N/a	—N/a	
2022	Jose Trevino	Christian Walker	Brendan Rodgers	Nolan Arenado (5)	Jorge Mateo	Steven Kwan	Myles Straw	Mookie Betts (5)	Ranger Suárez	Tommy Edman	—N/a	—N/a	
2023	Gabriel Moreno	Christian Walker (2)	Andrés Giménez	Ke'Bryan Hayes (2)	Dansby Swanson	Steven Kwan (2)	Kevin Kiermaier (3)	Fernando Tatís Jr.	Zack Greinke (3)	Mookie Betts (6)	Ke'Bryan Hayes	—N/a	
2024	Patrick Bailey	Matt Olson (4)	Andrés Giménez (2)	Matt Chapman (3)	Masyn Winn	Riley Greene	Brenton Doyle	Wilyer Abreu	Tanner Bibee	Daulton Varsho	Daulton Varsho	—N/a	
2025	Patrick Bailey (2)	Matt Olson (5)	Nico Hoerner	Ke'Bryan Hayes (3)	Mookie Betts (7)	Steven Kwan (3)	Ceddanne Rafaela	Fernando Tatís Jr. (2)	Max Fried (2)	Ernie Clement	Patrick Bailey	Chicago Cubs	
2026	Dillon Dingler	Matt Olson (6)	Brice Turang	Alex Bregman	Taylor Walls	Cody Bellinger (3)	Ceddanne Rafaela (2)	Wilyer Abreu (2)	Tanner Bibee (2)	Zach McKinstry	Pete Crow-Armstrong	Chicago Cubs	

== See also ==
- Wilson Defensive Player of the Year Award
- This Year in Baseball Awards, including Best Defensive Player
- MLB awards by other organizations
