= Ceddanne Rafaela =

Curaçaoan baseball player (born 2000)

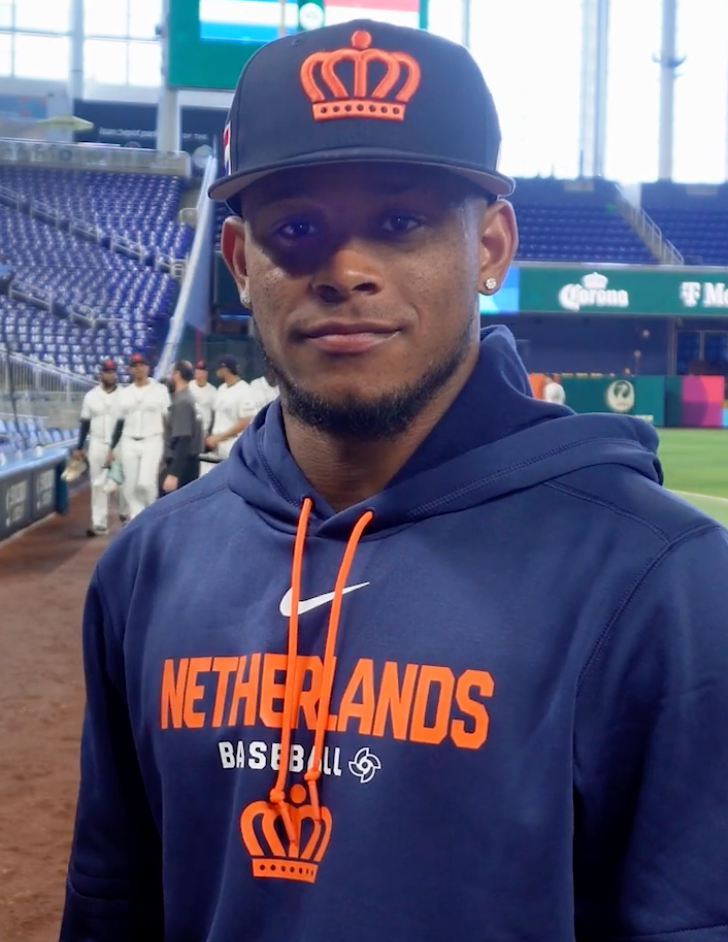
- Rafaela at the 2026 World Baseball Classic

Boston Red Sox – No. 3
- Center fielder
- Born: September 18, 2000 (age 26); Willemstad, Curaçao
- Bats: Right Throws: Right

MLB debut
- August 28, 2023, for the Boston Red Sox

MLB statistics (through 2026 season)
- Batting average: .258
- Home runs: 49
- Runs batted in: 213
- Stats at Baseball Reference

Teams
- Boston Red Sox (2023–present)

Career highlights and awards
- All-Star (2026); 2× Gold Glove Award (2025, 2026)

Ceddanne Chipper Nicasio Marte Rafaela (born September 18, 2000) is a Curaçaoan professional baseball center fielder for the Boston Red Sox of Major League Baseball (MLB). He made his MLB debut in 2023.

Born in Curaçao, Rafaela signed with Boston as an international free agent in July 2017 and made his professional debut in 2018 with the Dominican Summer League Red Sox. He spent the next several years rising through the Red Sox' farm system. Rafaela was selected to the All-Star Futures Game in 2022 before making his major league debut on August 28, 2023, against the Houston Astros. After making Boston's 2024 opening day roster, Rafaela signed an eight-year, $50 million contract extension in April, lasting through the 2031 season with a team option for 2032.

In 2025, Rafaela hit a home run at Fenway Park on June 4 against the Los Angeles Angels which was recorded as the shortest walk-off home run by any MLB player since Statcast began tracking in 2015. Facing the Detroit Tigers on September 26, Rafaela's walk-off triple clinched the Red Sox' first postseason berth since 2021. At the end of the season, he was awarded the MLB-wide Fielding Bible Award and the American League Gold Glove Award for his center field defense. Rafaela was named to his first All-Star game in 2026, and at the end of the season he won his second consecutive Fielding Bible and American League Gold Glove Awards in center field.

== Early life ==
Rafaela was born on September 18, 2000, in Willemstad, Curaçao. His mother gave him the middle name "Chipper" because she was a fan of Chipper Jones of the Atlanta Braves. Like Jones, both of Rafaela's parents played third base; his mother on competitive softball teams and his father in semi-professional baseball. Rafaela has an older brother who played baseball at North Central Missouri College and in the Curaçaoan summer league, and a younger sister.

Growing up in Willemstad, Rafaela played in the Pariba Little League and represented the Caribbean region with his team in the 2012 Little League World Series; Curaçao made it to the third round of competition before being eliminated by Mexico.

== Professional career ==
=== Minor leagues (2017–2023) ===
On July 2, 2017, Rafaela signed with the Boston Red Sox as an international free agent, receiving a $10,000 signing bonus. He made his professional debut with the Dominican Summer League (DSL) Red Sox in 2018, batting .271 with 31 runs scored, 28 runs batted in (RBIs), and 55 hits in 54 games and 225 plate appearances. Rafaela played 44 of those games at third base, making six errors and posting a fielding percentage of .957, and was named to the DSL Mid-Season All-Star team. The following year, Rafaela played 41 games for the Rookie-level Gulf Coast Red Sox, where he batted .248 with 17 RBI from 38 hits, including 6 home runs. He also played three games with the Lowell Spinners of the Class A Short Season New York-Pennsylvania League, recording two hits and an RBI in 12 plate appearances.

Rafaela was unable to play in 2020 due to the cancellation of the Minor League Baseball season as a result of the COVID-19 pandemic. The following year, he was promoted to the Single-A Salem Red Sox of the Low-A East league, where he batted .251 with 9 triples, 23 stolen bases, and 53 RBIs on 99 hits in 102 games played and 432 plate appearances. Defensively, Rafaela spent the majority of his season in the outfield for the first time, including 52 games as center fielder with .991 fielding percentage and only one error in the position, and was named the Red Sox' Minor League Defensive Player of the Year.

Rafaela began 2022 with the High-A Greenville Drive, batting .330 with 9 home runs and 65 hits in 45 games. On April 17, he was recognized as the South Atlantic League's Player of the Week, and later as the league's Hitter of the Month for April. Facing the Hickory Crawdads on May 17, Rafaela hit for a natural cycle, the first in Greenville's history. He was promoted to the Double-A Portland Sea Dogs in June, and in July, Rafaela was selected to represent the American League (AL) in the All-Star Futures Game to be played at Dodger Stadium, which was won by the AL Futures team 6–4. During the season, Rafaela had played 71 games for Portland and hit .278 with 12 home runs and 79 hits, and ranked fourth in the Eastern League with 6 triples. Between Greenville and Portland, Rafaela played the entire season (except one game) as either shortstop or center fielder, and recorded a .991 fielding percentage. He was again recognized as the Red Sox' Minor League Defensive Player of the Year, marking the first time a player had won the award in consecutive years since Jacoby Ellsbury in 2006 and 2007. Rafaela was also named as Boston's Minor League Player of the Year. On November 15, Rafaela was added to Boston's 40-man roster ahead of the Rule 5 draft.

Rafaela played for Criollos de Caguas in the 2022–23 Puerto Rican Winter League, batting .262 in 19 games played. In early 2023, Baseball America ranked Rafaela the 71st best minor league prospect, and he was placed 49th by FanGraphs. He returned to Double-A Portland to work on his hitting, and on May 13 set a franchise record after stealing base six times in one game while facing the Somerset Patriots. After hitting .294 and recording 30 stolen bases with an outfield fielding percentage of .974, Rafaela was promoted on June 28 to the Triple-A Worcester Red Sox of the International League. There, he hit 14 home runs with a .312 batting average, and committed no errors in 48 games, before being added to the Red Sox' major league roster on August 28.

=== Boston Red Sox (2023–present) ===
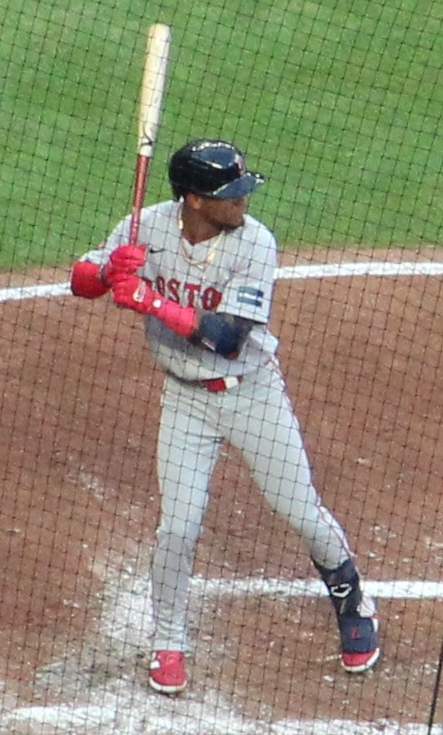
Rafaela with the Boston Red Sox in 2024

Rafaela made his MLB debut against the Houston Astros on August 28 at Fenway Park, hitting a single in his first major league at bat. On September 12, he hit his first major league home run off Carlos Rodón, in the second game of a double-header against the New York Yankees. Rafaela recorded a .241/.281/.286 slash line with the Red Sox in 28 games. He was named Boston's Minor League Baserunner of the Year.

Rafaela began his 2024 season by hitting a triple in his first Opening Day start. On April 8, he signed an eight-year contract extension with the Red Sox for $50 million, lasting through to the 2031 season with a team option for 2032. In his first game at Yankee Stadium on July 5, Rafaela hit a two-run home run in the top of the tenth inning to lift Boston to a 5–3 victory over the Yankees. By the end of the season, he had a .246 batting average, 15 home runs, 75 RBIs, and a .984 fielding percentage in the outfield. He turned two double plays, ranking first among center fielders and third among all American League (AL) outfielders.

==== 2025 ====
Rafaela started in center field in 2025 in his second consecutive Opening Day, recording his first RBI of the season by scoring Wilyer Abreu on a force out. On May 8, Rafaela won the MLB Play of the Week award for a catch against the wall of Fenway's center field off the bat of Josh Jung. Hitting a walk-off home run at Fenway on June 4 against the Los Angeles Angels, Rafaela hit the shortest home run by a Red Sox player since Statcast tracking began in 2015 and the shortest recorded walk-off home run of any MLB player in the Statcast era, traveling just 308 feet to land near the Pesky Pole.

On July 11, Rafaela hit his second walk-off home run of the season, facing the Tampa Bay Rays at Fenway, sending the pitch from Pete Fairbanks over the Green Monster—the 37 ft (11.33m) tall left field wall at Fenway—to lead the Red Sox to their eighth consecutive win of the season—their longest win record of the season to date, and the longest win streak since their eight-game win streak from April 29–May 6, 2023. He was awarded the MLB Play of the Week for a second time on September 7, for robbing Arizona Diamondbacks outfielder Corbin Carroll of a home run in right-center field at Chase Field the day before. On September 26, Rafaela hit a walk-off triple against the Detroit Tigers to secure a 4–3 victory and Boston's first postseason berth since 2021. In his playoff debut, Rafaela batted 0-for-10 as Boston lost to the Yankees in the AL Wild Card Series.

Rafaela ended the regular season with a .249 batting average, 16 home runs, and 63 RBIs. He also recorded a .985 fielding percentage playing center field in 141 games, including an AL-best 8 assists, and a .958 fielding percentage in 24 games played at second base. He won the center fielder Fielding Bible Award on October 23 and the center fielder AL Gold Glove Award on November 2.

==== 2026 ====
Starting in center field for his third consecutive Opening Day, Rafaela brought Marcelo Mayer home on a single for his first RBI of the season. Rafaela hit his first home run of the season on March 31 during the Red Sox' 9–2 loss to the Houston Astros at Daikin Park, and the following day, robbed Jake Meyers of the Astros of a hit by making a catch in right-center field with a 5% catch probability, according to Statcast. Rafaela was selected to play in the 2026 MLB All-Star Game on July 10, replacing injured outfielder Aaron Judge on the American League roster. On August 3rd, Rafaela earned his first Player of the Week Award, leading the American League in homeruns, with five, and OPS, with a mark of 1.387. He also hit his first career grand slam that week, off of Athletics pitcher José Suarez.

At the end of the season, Rafaela was nominated for his second consecutive American League Gold Glove in center field, alongside Red Sox right outfielder Wilyer Abreu and third baseman Caleb Durbin.

== International career ==
Rafaela committed to play in the 2026 World Baseball Classic for the Netherlands national team in July 2025, and in February 2026, he was formally named to the Netherlands roster. Rafaela played in four games of the tournament, slashing .176/.222/.176 as the Netherlands finished 1–3 and were eliminated in pool play.

== Personal life ==
Rafaela speaks English, Dutch, Spanish, and Papiamento. He grew up a fan of the Boston Red Sox; his favourite hitter was Manny Ramirez, and his favourite defender was Dustin Pedroia. His wife is from Puerto Rico, which influenced his decision to play in the 2022–23 Puerto Rican Winter League. They have three children.
