= Ke'Bryan Hayes =

American baseball player (born 1997)

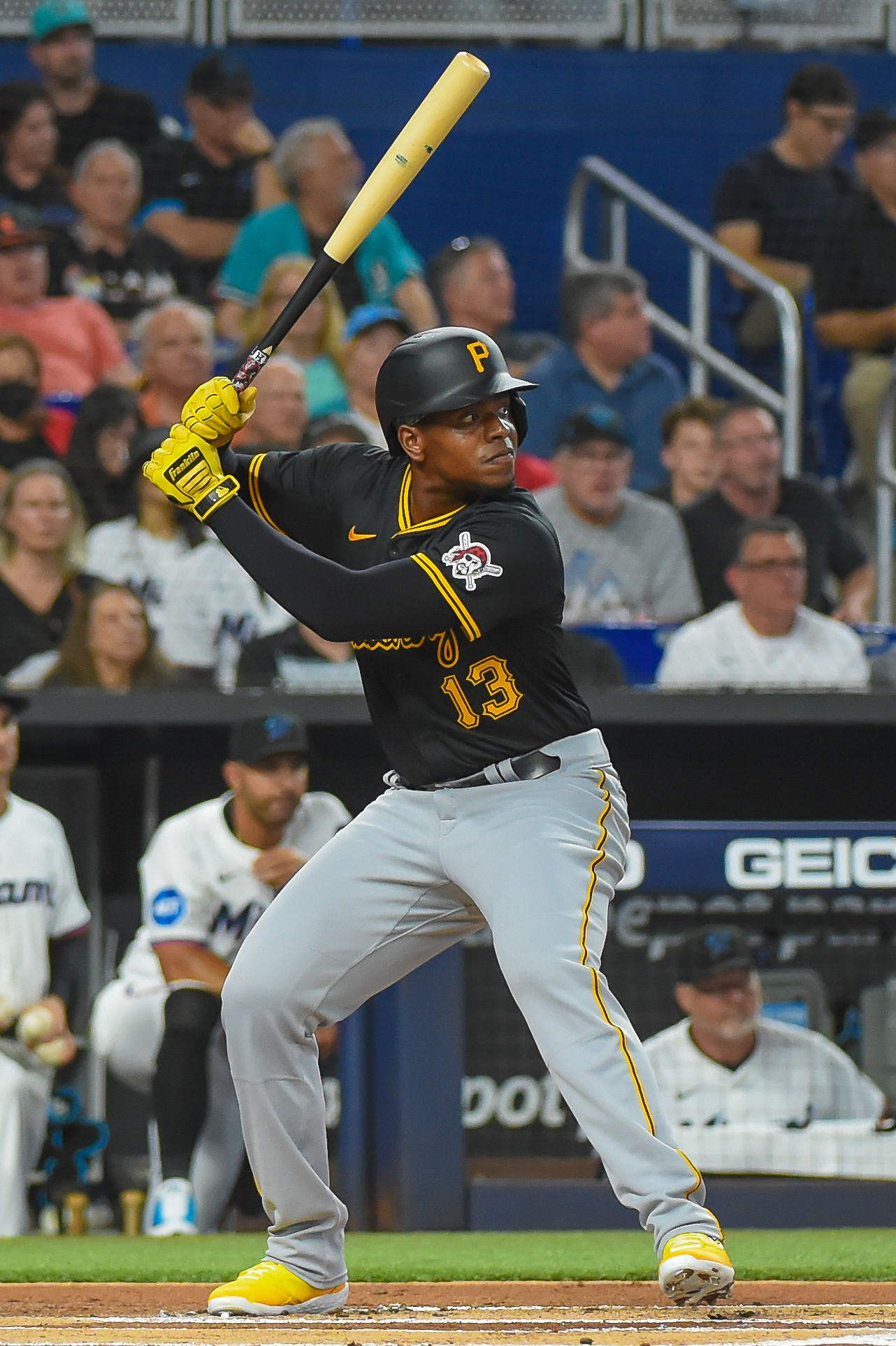
- Hayes with Pittsburgh Pirates in 2024

Cincinnati Reds – No. 3
- Third baseman
- Born: January 28, 1997 (age 29); Tomball, Texas, U.S.
- Bats: Right Throws: Right

MLB debut
- September 1, 2020, for the Pittsburgh Pirates

MLB statistics (through 2026 season)
- Batting average: .243
- Home runs: 47
- Runs batted in: 234
- Stats at Baseball Reference

Teams
- Pittsburgh Pirates (2020–2025); Cincinnati Reds (2025–present)

Career highlights and awards
- 2× Gold Glove Award (2023, 2025)

Ke'Bryan Kobe Hayes (KEE-bry-ən; born January 28, 1997) is an American professional baseball third baseman for the Cincinnati Reds of Major League Baseball (MLB). He has previously played in MLB for the Pittsburgh Pirates. He made his MLB debut in 2020 with the Pirates and won a Gold Glove Award in 2023.

== Amateur career ==
Hayes attended Concordia Lutheran High School in Tomball, Texas. He committed to play college baseball at the University of Tennessee. In 2015, as a high school senior, Hayes hit .436 with three home runs, 27 runs batted in (RBI), and 12 stolen bases.

== Professional career ==
=== Pittsburgh Pirates ===
The Pittsburgh Pirates selected Hayes in the first round, with the 32nd overall selection, of the 2015 MLB draft. Foregoing his college commitment, Hayes signed with Pittsburgh, and spent 2015 with both the Gulf Coast League Pirates and the West Virginia Black Bears, batting a combined .308, with 20 RBI, in 56 games.

In 2016, Hayes spent the season with the West Virginia Power, where he earned South Atlantic League All-Star honors and compiled a .263 average, with six home runs, and 37 RBI, in 65 games. In 2017, Hayes moved up with the Bradenton Marauders, where he batted .278, with two home runs, and 43 RBI, in 108 games and was named a Florida State League All-Star.

Hayes played for the Altoona Curve in 2018, and was named an Eastern League All-Star and slashing .293/.375/.444 with seven home runs and 47 RBIs in 117 games. In 2019, Hayes split the season between the West Virginia Black Bears and the Indianapolis Indians, hitting .261/.334/.411/.745, with 10 home runs, and 55 RBI. Following the season, he was added to the Pirates 40-man roster.

On July 19, 2020, it was announced that Hayes had tested positive for COVID-19. On September 1, the Pirates promoted him to the majors. Making his MLB debut the same day, he hit his first career home run against the Chicago Cubs. Hayes received five votes in 2020 National League Rookie of the Year voting, finishing in sixth place.

In his 2021 season debut against the Cubs, Hayes hit a home run in his first at-bat of the season. On April 4, 2021, Hayes was placed on the 10-day injured list due to left wrist inflammation after leaving a game the previous day because of the injury. On May 9, Hayes was placed on the 60-day injured list. He was activated on June 3. On June 11, Hayes became the quickest Pirate to 20 career extra-base hits in the modern era, one game faster than Barry Bonds. Hayes finished the 2021 season batting .257/.316/.373 with six home runs, 38 RBI, and nine stolen bases in 96 games. He was awarded the Fielding Bible Award for excellent defense as a third baseman.

On April 7, 2022, Hayes agreed to an eight-year, $70 million contract extension with the Pirates, which became official on April 12. He made 136 appearances for Pittsburgh, batting .244/.314/.345 with seven home runs, 41 RBI, and 20 stolen bases.

Hayes made 124 appearances for the Pirates during the 2023 season, slashing .271/.309/.453 with 15 home runs, 61 RBI, and 10 stolen bases. On November 5, 2023, Hayes won the Rawlings Gold Glove Award for NL third basemen, breaking Nolan Arenado's streak of 10 consecutive Gold Glove awards.

Hayes made 96 appearances for the Pirates in the 2024 campaign, batting .233/.283/.290 with four home runs, 25 RBI, and 11 stolen bases. He played in 100 games for Pittsburgh in 2025, slashing .236/.279/.290 with two home runs, 36 RBI, and 10 stolen bases.

=== Cincinnati Reds ===
On July 30, 2025, Hayes was traded to the Cincinnati Reds in exchange for Taylor Rogers, Sammy Stafura, and cash considerations.

== Personal life ==
Ke'Bryan is the son of Charlie Hayes, who played for 14 seasons in MLB. His older brother Tyree was a pitcher in the minor leagues.

== See also ==
- List of second-generation Major League Baseball players
