= Brenton Doyle =

American baseball player (born 1998)

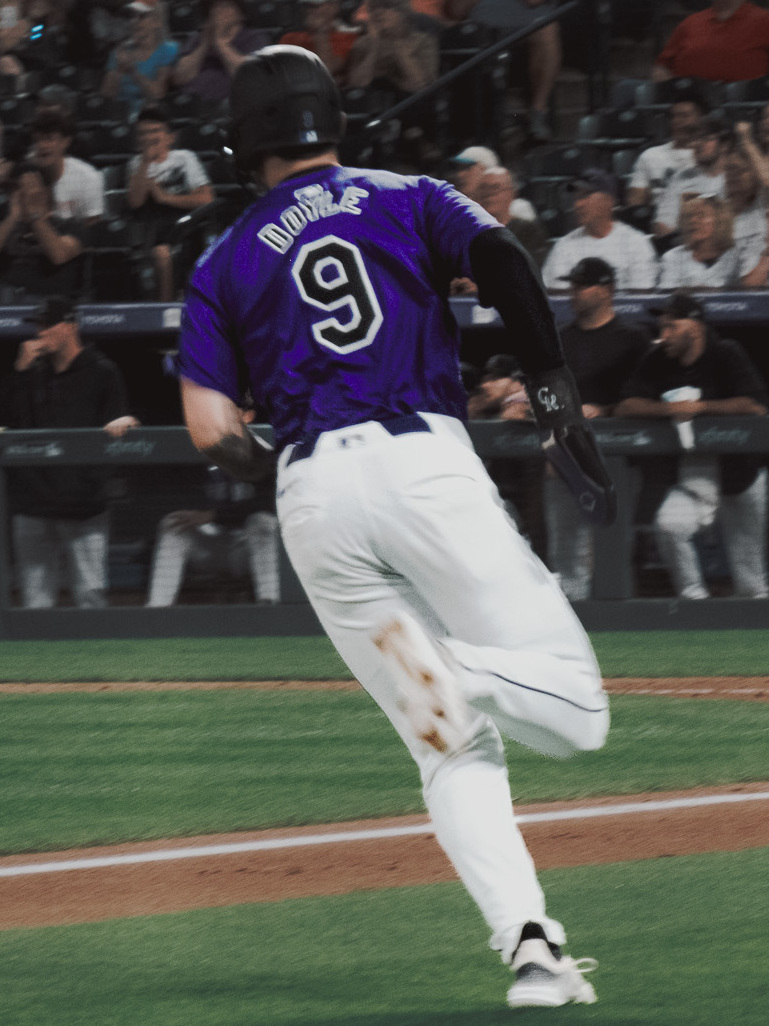
- Doyle with the Colorado Rockies in 2024

Chicago White Sox – No. 7
- Center fielder
- Born: May 14, 1998 (age 28); Warrenton, Virginia, U.S.
- Bats: Right Throws: Right

MLB debut
- April 24, 2023, for the Colorado Rockies

MLB statistics (through 2026 season)
- Batting average: .235
- Home runs: 54
- Runs batted in: 193
- Stats at Baseball Reference

Teams
- Colorado Rockies (2023–2026); Chicago White Sox (2026–present)

Career highlights and awards
- 2× Gold Glove Award (2023, 2024)

Brenton Edward Doyle (born May 14, 1998) is an American professional baseball center fielder for the Chicago White Sox of Major League Baseball (MLB). He has previously played in MLB for the Colorado Rockies. Doyle played college baseball at Shepherd University. He made his MLB debut in 2023 and won Gold Glove Awards in 2023 and 2024.

== Amateur career ==
Doyle was born and grew up in Warrenton, Virginia, and attended Kettle Run High School. He was named the 3A East Region Player of the Year as a junior after batting .443. He initially intended to pursue a military career and committed to play college baseball at the Virginia Military Institute but decommitted late in his senior year. He later played at Division II Shepherd University.

In all three of his seasons with the Shepherd Rams for three seasons, Doyle hit over .300. He was named the Mountain East Conference Player of the Year in 2018 after hitting .415 with 14 home runs, 16 doubles, and 68 RBIs. Doyle repeated as the conference player of the year in 2019, batting .392 with 13 home runs, six triples, 17 doubles, 47 RBIs, and 79 runs scored as a junior.

Doyle's college uniform number was retired in 2023, and his high school number was retired in 2026.

== Professional career ==
=== Colorado Rockies ===
The Colorado Rockies drafted Doyle in the fourth round, with the 129th overall selection of the 2019 Major League Baseball draft. He received a $500,000 signing bonus. Doyle was assigned to the Grand Junction Rockies of the Pioneer League, where he led the league with a .383 batting average with 8 home runs, 33 RBI, and 17 stolen bases. He let the league in batting average and on-base percentage. He did not play in a game in 2020 due to the cancellation of the minor league season because of the COVID-19 pandemic and spent most of the year training in Manassas, Virginia at a baseball complex alongside local college players until taking part in the Rockies' fall instructional league.

Doyle was named the best overall athlete in the Rockies' minor league system going into the 2021 season by MLB.com. He was assigned to the Spokane Indians of the High-A West League for 2021, where he batted .279 with 16 home runs, 47 RBIs, and 21 stolen bases in 97 games played and won a Minor League Gold Glove Award.

Doyle played most of the 2022 season for the Double-A Hartford Yard Goats, appearing in nine games for the Triple-A Albuquerque Isotopes in September. In 132 games, he hit a combined .256/.300/.473 slash line with 26 home runs, 77 RBI, and 23 stolen bases. On November 15, the Rockies added Doyle to their 40-man roster to protect him from the Rule 5 draft.

Doyle was optioned to Triple-A Albuquerque to begin the 2023 season. On April 24, Doyle was promoted to the major leagues for the first time. He had hit .306/.404/.633 with 5 home runs and 8 RBIs in 12 Triple-A games prior to his promotion. Doyle made his major league debut later that day, starting in center field and going hitless in three at-bats with one walk and one run scored.

On September 2, Doyle made a throw from center field with a speed of 105.7 mph, the fastest throw by a position player since at least 2015, according to Statcast. Doyle ended his rookie season hitting .203 with 10 home runs and 22 stolen bases in 126 games while winning a Gold Glove Award in center field.

In 2024, Doyle won his second consecutive Gold Glove. He had an 11.4 ultimate zone rating (UZR), the highest among all MLB center fielders and second-best among all MLB players. He was worth 16 Outs Above Average (OAA) and had 14 Defensive Runs Saved (DRS). In addition, he won the Fielding Bible Award for center field. He became the first Rockies player to win back-to-back Gold Glove Awards since Nolan Arenado did so in 2019 and 2020.

For the season, Doyle hit .260/.317/.446 with 23 home runs and 30 stolen bases in 149 games. He was named the National League Player of the Month for July, after batting .333 with 19 extra-base hits.

In April 2025, Doyle went on the bereavement list, missing seven days after his wife suffered a miscarriage. He later said he may have returned to the team too soon. He also worked to improve his swing, missing several games in May. For the season, he batted .233/.274/.376 in 138 games, with 15 home runs and 18 steals. Most of his offensive and defensive numbers fell from 2024. He had 6 OAA and 0 DRS in center field.

=== Chicago White Sox ===
On August 3, 2026, the Rockies traded Doyle to the Chicago White Sox in exchange for Mason Adams and Carlos Vielma.

== Personal life ==
Doyle is married and has a daughter. His wife suffered a miscarriage in 2025.

Awards and achievements
Preceded by Bryce Harper	National League Player of the Month; July 2024	Succeeded by Corbin Carroll
