= Steven Kwan =

American baseball player (born 1997)

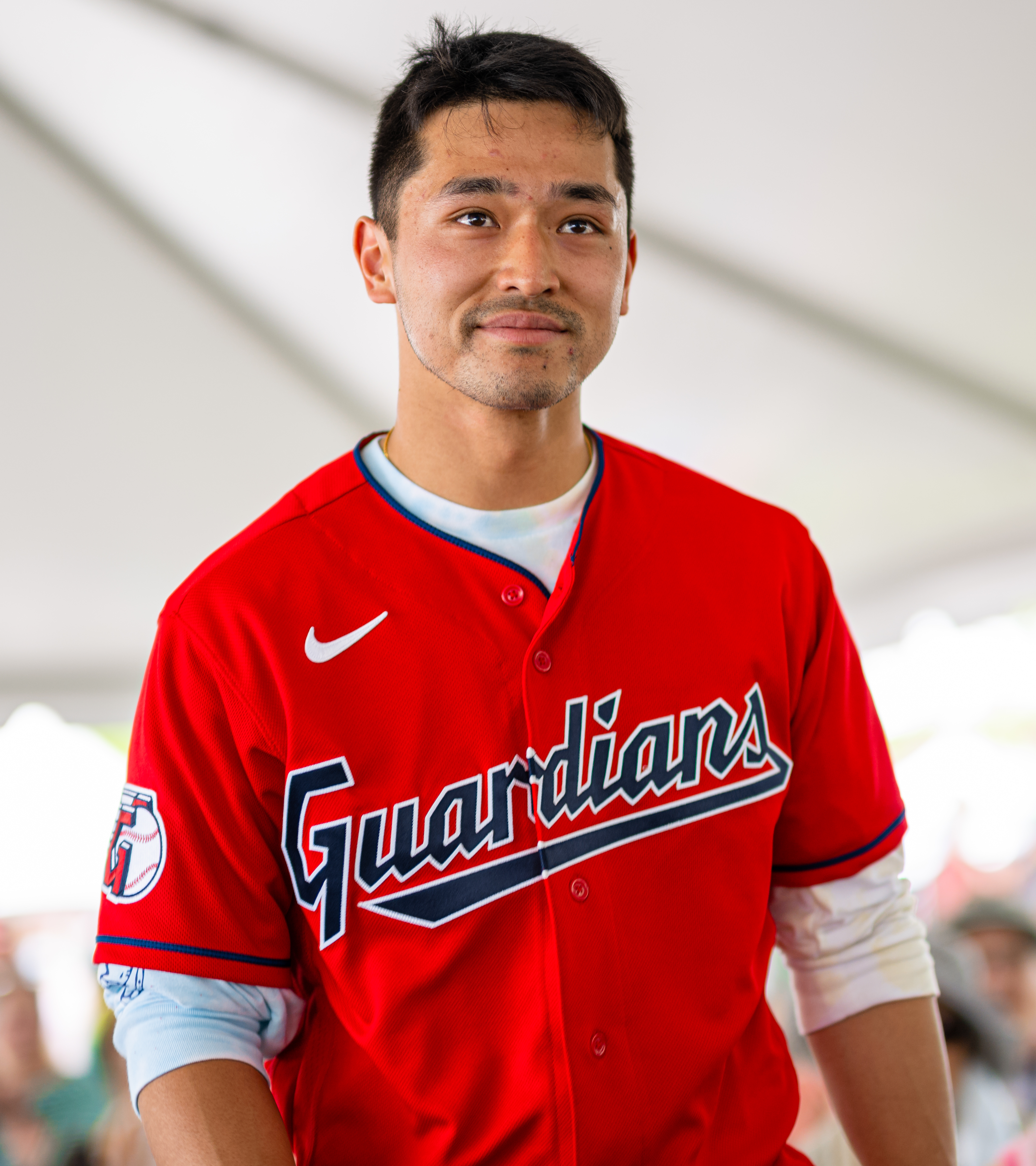
- Kwan with the Cleveland Guardians in 2022

Cleveland Guardians – No. 38
- Outfielder
- Born: September 5, 1997 (age 29); Los Gatos, California, U.S.
- Bats: Left Throws: Left

MLB debut
- April 7, 2022, for the Cleveland Guardians

MLB statistics (through 2026 season)
- Batting average: .282
- Home runs: 39
- Runs batted in: 238
- Stats at Baseball Reference

Teams
- Cleveland Guardians (2022–present)

Career highlights and awards
- 2× All-Star (2024, 2025); 4× Gold Glove Award (2022–2025)

Steven Robert Kwan (born September 5, 1997) is an American professional baseball outfielder for the Cleveland Guardians of Major League Baseball (MLB). He made his MLB debut in 2022.

Born in Los Gatos, California and raised in Fremont, California, Kwan played three years of college baseball at Oregon State University before being selected by Cleveland in the fifth round of the 2018 MLB draft. He was a member of their minor league system for four years before making Cleveland's Opening Day roster in 2022, quickly becoming a part of their starting lineup, playing all three outfield positions. Following the conclusion of his rookie year, he earned a Gold Glove Award for his defense in left field and was a finalist for AL Rookie of the Year. Kwan is a two-time MLB All-Star and four-time Gold Glove winner.

== Amateur career ==
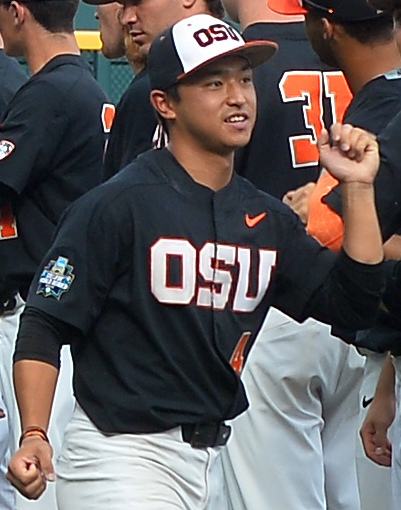
Kwan during the 2018 College World Series

Kwan attended Washington High School in Fremont, California, where he batted .462 as a senior in 2015. After graduating, he enrolled at Oregon State University where he played college baseball for the Beavers. As a freshman in 2016, he played in 35 games in which he hit .215. He later said that, as a freshman, he did not feel he belonged at Oregon State among their "high recruits." He sat out two months of the season and had to visit with a sports psychologist. His play improved in 2017 as a sophomore and he appeared in 55 games (making 42 starts), batting .331 with one home run, 18 runs batted in (RBIs), six doubles, and eight stolen bases. After the 2017 season, he played collegiate summer baseball with the Wareham Gatemen of the Cape Cod Baseball League.

As a junior in 2018, Kwan played in 66 games and hit .355/.463/.457 with two home runs, 41 RBIs, and 14 stolen bases. He batted leadoff ahead of Nick Madrigal, Trevor Larnach and Adley Rutschman and helped lead the Beavers to a national championship in the 2018 College World Series. After his junior year, he was selected by the Cleveland Indians in the fifth round of the 2018 Major League Baseball draft.

== Professional career ==
=== Minor leagues ===
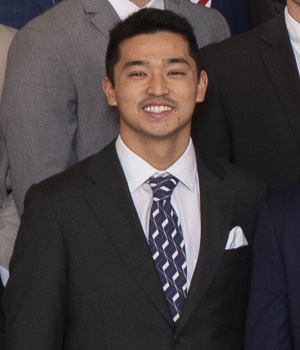
Kwan at the White House in 2019

Kwan signed with the Guardians organization when it was still known as the Indians and made his professional debut with the Arizona League Indians. He was later promoted to the Mahoning Valley Scrappers, hitting a combined .346 over 17 games between the two clubs. In 2019, he played with the Lynchburg Hillcats, batting .280 with three home runs, 39 RBIs, and 26 doubles over 123 games.

He did not play a game in 2020 due to the cancellation of the minor league season caused by the COVID-19 pandemic. Kwan began the 2021 season with the Akron RubberDucks and was promoted to the Columbus Clippers in late August. He missed six weeks during the season due to a strained right hamstring. Over 77 games between the two clubs, Kwan slashed .328/.407/.527 with 12 home runs and 44 RBIs. The newly named Cleveland Guardians selected Kwan to their 40-man roster on November 19, 2021.

=== Major leagues ===
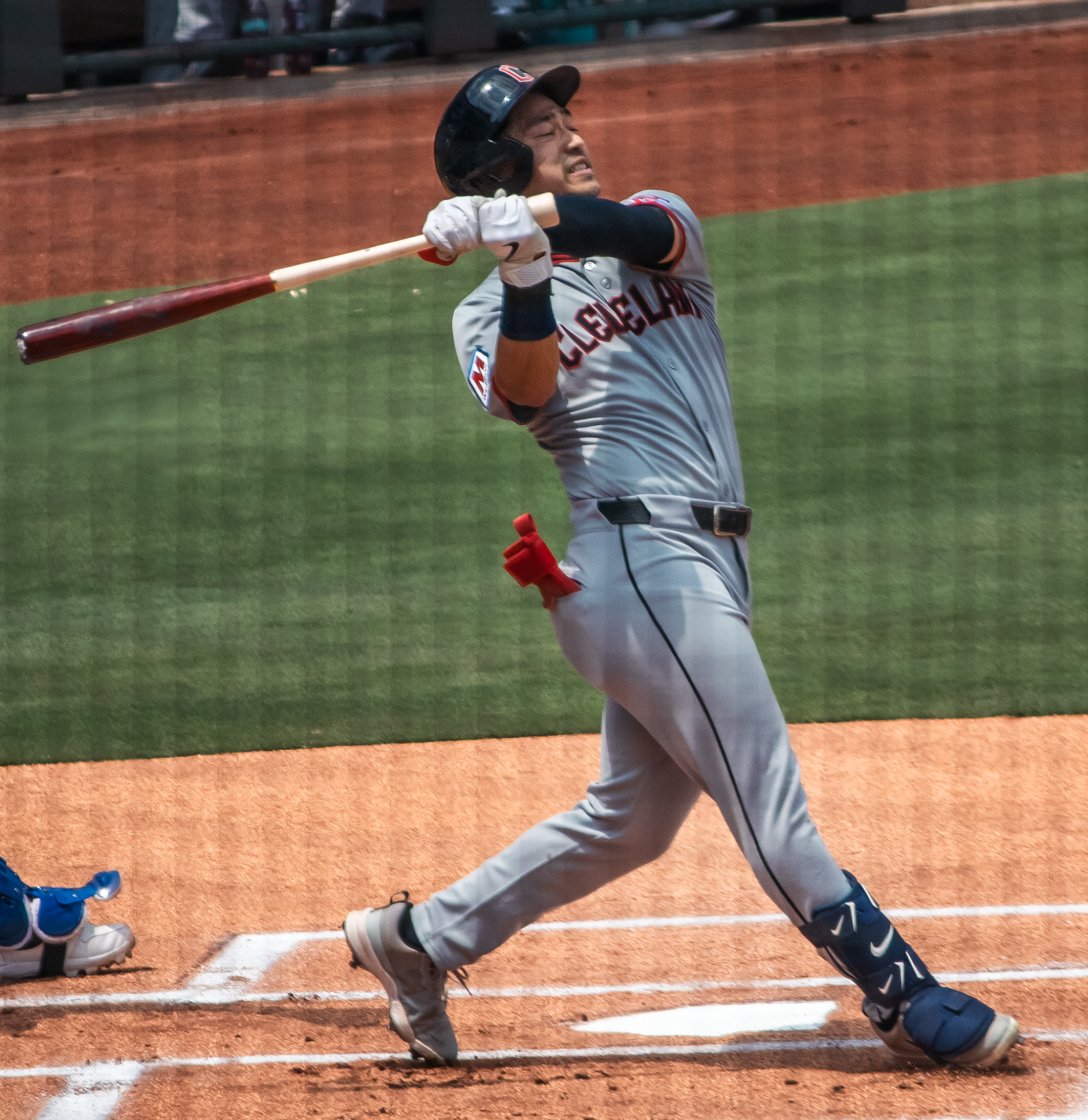
Kwan swinging in 2025

On April 2, 2022, the Guardians announced that Kwan had been named to the Opening Day roster. He made his MLB debut on Opening Day as the starting right fielder on April 7, and recorded his first major league hit off Kansas City Royals reliever Scott Barlow. After making his debut, he became just the sixth player since at least 1901 to have a five-hit game within his first three major league games, and also became the first player since at least 1901 to reach base safely 15 times in his first four games. He saw 116 pitches before he swung and missed, the most for any batter to start his career since 2000.

Kwan was named American League Rookie of the Month for April and September 2022. He hit his first major league home run on May 5 off of José Berríos. On September 25, Kwan hit his first career grand slam off of Joe Barlow of the Texas Rangers.

In 2022, Kwan had the lowest percentage of hard-hit balls in the majors (18.9%), the highest called-strike percentage in the majors (24.5%), and batted .298/.373/.400 with six home runs, 52 RBIs, 19 stolen bases, and 25 doubles alongside 62 walks and 60 strikeouts over 147 games. Kwan's 62 walks compared to 60 strikeouts made him the first rookie to record more walks than strikeouts since Dustin Pedroia in 2007. On defense, Kwan was awarded the American League's left field Gold Glove Award. He was named a finalist for the American League Rookie of the Year Award, alongside Adley Rutschman and Julio Rodríguez.

In 2023, Kwan had the lowest strikeout percentage in the AL (10.4%) and the lowest maximum exit velocity (105.2 mph), while batting .268/.340/.370 with five home runs, 54 RBIs, and 21 stolen bases. He won his second consecutive Gold Glove Award for American League left fielders.

In 2024, Kwan missed close to a month due to a left hamstring strain. He still played in 122 games and batted .292/.368/.425 with 14 home runs and 83 RBIs. Kwan was named to the 2024 Major League Baseball All-Star Game, his first All-Star selection, and was named the starting left fielder for the American League team. He also won his third consecutive Gold Glove Award for American League left fielders.

In 2025, Kwan batted .272/.330/.374 with 11 home runs, 56 RBIs, and 21 stolen bases across 156 games. He was named to the 2025 Major League Baseball All-Star Game, his second consecutive selection. Kwan also won his fourth consecutive Gold Glove Award for American League left fielders.

Prior to the 2026 season, Kwan and the Guardians agreed on a $7.725 million contract to avoid salary arbitration. He played in 151 games for the Guardians in 2026 and ended the season with a .282 batting average, three home runs, and 32 RBIs.

== Personal life ==
Kwan is of Chinese and Japanese descent. His paternal grandparents are from Guangzhou, China, whereas his maternal grandparents are from Yamagata Prefecture, Japan. He was nearly recruited to play for the Japanese national baseball team in international competition 2023 World Baseball Classic, but was found to be ineligible because neither of his parents held either Japanese citizenship or a Japanese passport. In 2024, he expressed his interest in playing for Japan in future competitions. In February 2025, Kwan married girlfriend Samantha Moy in a courthouse wedding. Kwan grew up a San Francisco Giants fan.
