= Wilyer Abreu =

Venezuelan baseball player (born 1999)

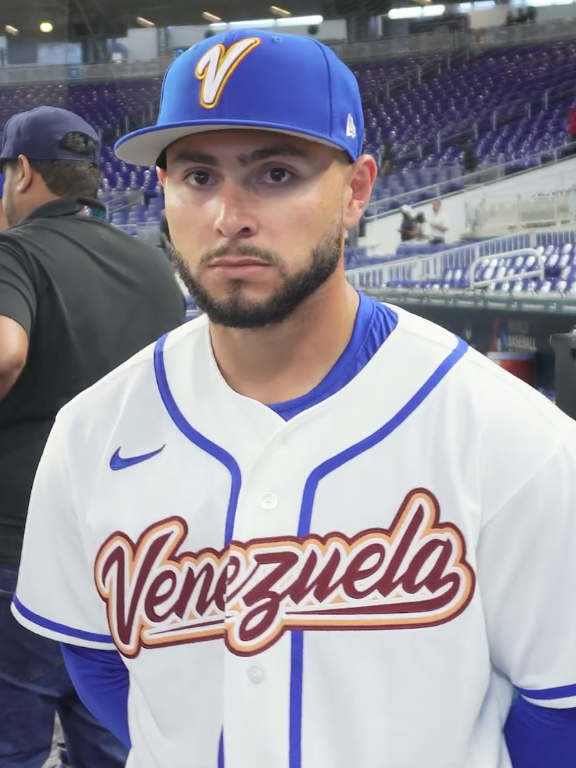
- Abreu with Venezuela in 2026

Boston Red Sox – No. 52
- Right fielder
- Born: June 24, 1999 (age 27); Maracaibo, Venezuela
- Bats: Left Throws: Left

MLB debut
- August 22, 2023, for the Boston Red Sox

MLB statistics (through 2026 season)
- Batting average: .253
- Home runs: 63
- Runs batted in: 217
- Stats at Baseball Reference

Teams
- Boston Red Sox (2023–present)

Career highlights and awards
- 3× Gold Glove Award (2024–2026)
Medals
Men's baseball
Representing Venezuela
World Baseball Classic
Gold medal – first place	2026 Miami	Team

Wilyer David Abreu (born June 24, 1999) is a Venezuelan professional baseball right fielder for the Boston Red Sox of Major League Baseball (MLB). He made his MLB debut in 2023 and won a Gold Glove Award in 2024, 2025, and 2026.

== Career ==
=== Houston Astros ===
On July 2, 2017, Abreu signed with the Houston Astros as an international free agent. He made his professional debut that year with the Dominican Summer League Astros. Abreu spent the 2018 season with the rookie-level Gulf Coast League Astros, playing in 41 games and batting .223/.310/.302 with 16 RBI and eight stolen bases.

Abreu advanced to Single-A in 2019, splitting the year between the Quad Cities River Bandits and the Low-A Tri-City ValleyCats. In 59 appearances for the two affiliates, he hit a combined .255/.326/.365 with two home runs, 13 RBI, and six stolen bases. Abreu did not play in a game in 2020 due to the cancellation of the minor league season because of the COVID-19 pandemic.

Abreu returned to action in 2021 with the High-A Asheville Tourists, slashing .268/.363/.495 with 16 home runs, 50 RBI, and 10 stolen bases across 82 appearances. He began the 2022 season with the Double-A Corpus Christi Hooks, batting .249/.399/.459 with 15 home runs, 54 RBI, and 23 stolen bases over 89 games.

=== Boston Red Sox ===
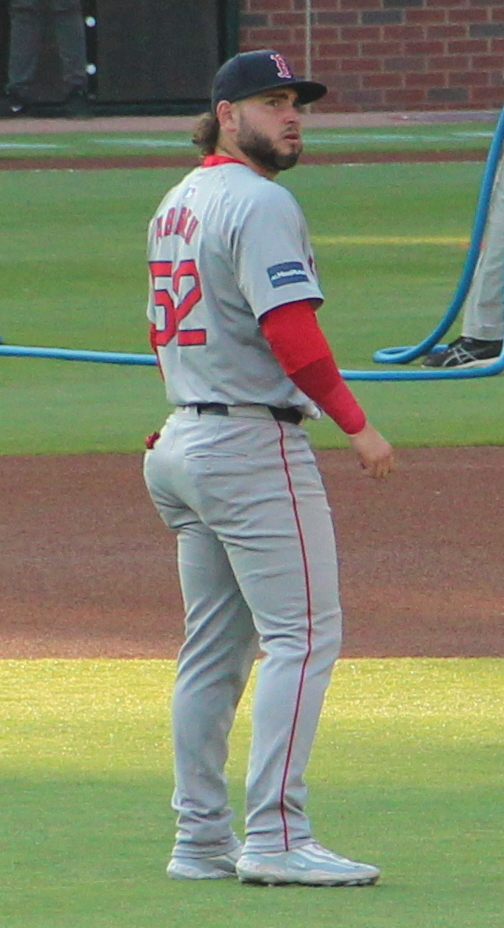
Abreu with the Red Sox in 2024

On August 1, 2022, the Astros traded Abreu and Enmanuel Valdez to the Boston Red Sox for catcher Christian Vázquez. Abreu played 40 games for the Double-A Portland Sea Dogs, batting .242/.399/.375 with four home runs, 19 RBIs, and eight stolen bases. After the regular season, he played for the Scottsdale Scorpions in the Arizona Fall League and posted a .167/.275/.204 slash line with 18 strikeouts in 54 at-bats. On November 15, the Red Sox added Abreu to their 40-man roster to protect him from the Rule 5 draft.

In a spring training game in early March 2023, Abreu suffered a left hamstring strain while running out a base hit against the Miami Marlins, following which Red Sox manager Alex Cora said he "will be out for a while." On March 11, he was optioned to the Triple-A Worcester Red Sox. On August 22, Abreu was promoted to the major leagues for the first time following an injury to Jarren Duran. Abreu made his major-league debut that evening, in a game against the Astros, and recorded his first MLB hit. In late August, he spent time on the paternity list. Overall, Abreu appeared in 28 major-league games, batting .316 with two home runs and 14 RBIs. In 86 Triple-A games with Worcester, he batted .274 with 22 home runs and 65 RBIs. He was also named to the post-season Triple-A all-star team.

Abreu spent the 2024 season with Boston, appearing in 132 games including 106 starts in right field. He batted .253 with 15 home runs and 58 RBIs. Abreu was named the Fielding Bible Award winner among major-league right fielders and the Gold Glove Award winner at that position for the American League (AL).

Abreu hit two home runs on Opening Day in 2025, against the Texas Rangers. He was the seventh player in Red Sox history to record a two-homer game on Opening Day. Abreu hit two home runs on June 30 against the Cincinnati Reds. His first home run was an inside-the-park home run, and the second was a grand slam, the first of his career. He was the sixth player to hit an inside-the-park home run and a grand slam (separately) in a game, the first since Roger Maris in 1958. In 2025, Abreu played in 115 games, including 95 starts in right field He batted .247 with 22 home runs and 69 RBIs. On November 2, Abreu won the Gold Glove for AL right fielders.

In 2026, Abreu appeared in 157 games and batted .248/.327/.446 with 24 home runs and 76 RBIs. He led the American League with 38 doubles and 13 outfield assists.

== International career ==
Abreu played for the Venezuela national team in the 2026 World Baseball Classic. He hit a go-ahead three-run home run in a quarterfinal win over Japan. He also hit a home run in the finals against the United States en route to the WBC championship. Later in 2026, he was inducted into the Venezuelan Baseball Hall of Fame as a member of the 2026 WBC championship team.

== Personal life ==
Abreu is married. The couple's first child was born in August 2023. During spring training in 2025, his wife had twins.
