= 2024 Boston Red Sox season =

2024 Boston Red Sox
- League: American League
- Division: East
- Ballpark: Fenway Park
- City: Boston, Massachusetts
- Record: 81–81 (.500)
- Divisional place: 3rd
- Owners: John W. Henry (Fenway Sports Group)
- President: Sam Kennedy
- Chief baseball officer: Craig Breslow
- Manager: Alex Cora
- Television: NESN: Dave O’Brien or Mike Monaco (play-by-play); Lou Merloni, Will Middlebrooks, Kevin Millar, Kevin Youkilis (analyst rotation); (Note: On August 8, 2024, NESN announced that Emma Tiedemann and Rylee Pay, normally the broadcast team for the Portland Sea Dogs, would be part of the broadcast team for the Red Sox' home game of August 26 facing the Toronto Blue Jays. They became the first female duo to broadcast a Red Sox game.) Jahmai Webster (sideline)
- Radio: WEEI-FM / Boston Red Sox Radio Network: Joe Castiglione, (Note: On September 15, 2024, Castiglione announced his retirement, effective at the end of the 2024 season.) Will Flemming, Sean McDonough, Lou Merloni (rotation)

The 2024 Boston Red Sox season was the 124th season in Boston Red Sox franchise history, and their 113th season at Fenway Park. The team was led by Alex Cora, in the fourth season of his second stint as the team's on-field manager, (Note: On July 24, 2024, the Red Sox announced that Cora agreed to a three-year contract extension, through the 2027 season.) while Craig Breslow was in his first season as the team's Chief Baseball Officer. The team's regular season began on March 28, with a road game against the Seattle Mariners, and concluded on September 29, with a home game against the Tampa Bay Rays.

Despite holding a 53–43 record and being two games up on a playoff spot at the All-Star Break, the Red Sox struggled throughout the second half and were eliminated from playoff contention on September 25, and ultimately finished in third-place of the American League East with a record of 81–81, an improvement from their 78–84 record during the 2023 season. The team was marred by poor defensive play throughout the season, leading the American League in errors. Average attendance at home games was 32,839.

== Offseason ==
October–December 2023

=== October ===
- On October 2, the team recalled Justin Garza, Bryan Mata, Joe Jacques, Logan Gillaspie, Zack Weiss, Brandon Walter, and David Hamilton (baseball) from the Worcester Red Sox. The team activated Triston Casas and Luis Urías from the 10-day injured list; as well as James Paxton (baseball), Chris Martin (baseball) and Joely Rodríguez from the 15-day injured list.
- On October 9, the team dismissed pitching coach Dave Bush and third-base coach / infield coach Carlos Febles.
- On October 13, pitcher Kaleb Ort was claimed off waivers by the Seattle Mariners.
- On October 14, the team signed pitcher Merlin Bido to a minor league contract.
- On October 23, the team signed pitcher Adam Bates to a minor league contract.
- On October 25, the team announced the hiring of Craig Breslow, a former MLB pitcher who was a member of Boston's 2013 World Series championship team, as the team's new Chief Baseball Officer. He succeeded Chaim Bloom, who was fired in September 2023 along with the removal of Brian O'Halloran as general manager.
- On October 30, the team signed pitcher Dariel Morillo to a minor league contract.

=== November ===
- On November 1, the team signed outfielder Mark Contreras to a minor league contract.
- On November 2, Adam Duvall, Adalberto Mondesí, and James Paxton elected to become free agents.
- On November 3, the team announced that Justin Turner declined his 2024 player option, and the Red Sox declined their 2024 club option for Corey Kluber.
  - Turner signed a one-year contract with the Toronto Blue Jays in late January.
- On November 4, the team declined their 2024 option for Joely Rodríguez.
- On November 6, the team signed pitcher Jeremy Pena to a minor league contract. The team activated pitcher Wyatt Mills and second baseman Jarren Duran from the 60-day injured list; pitchers Corey Kluber, Justin Garza, Joely Rodríguez, and third baseman Justin Turner elected free agency.
- On November 13, the team signed pitcher Jeison Payano to a minor league contract.
- On November 14, the team selected the contracts of pitchers Wikelman Gonzalez from the Portland Sea Dogs and Luis Perales from Greenville Drive.
- On November 15, the San Diego Padres claimed pitcher Logan Gillaspie off waivers from the Red Sox.
- On November 16, the signed pitcher Luis Cabrera; the team also signed Helcris Olivarez to a minor league contract.
- On November 17, the team traded infielder Luis Urías to the Seattle Mariners for pitcher Isaiah Campbell, and declined to tender an offer to pitcher Wyatt Mills. Mills did not play for the team during 2023 due to injury; after briefly being a free agent, he was re-signed by the Red Sox to a two-year minor-league contract.
  - As of the non-tender deadline, the team had 37 players on their 40-man roster, intending to offer contracts for the 2024 season to 29 players along with the eight already under contract: Rafael Devers, Kenley Jansen, Chris Martin, Rob Refsnyder, Chris Sale, Trevor Story, Garrett Whitlock, and Masataka Yoshida.
- On November 21, the team hired former pitcher Andrew Bailey as pitching coach.
- On November 22, team signed pitcher Jorge Benetiz to a minor league contract.

=== December ===
- On December 5, the team traded outfielder Alex Verdugo to the New York Yankees for major-league pitcher Greg Weissert and minor-league pitchers Richard Fitts and Nicholas Judice.
- On December 6, the National Baseball Hall of Fame and Museum announced longtime Red Sox radio broadcaster Joe Castiglione as the recipient of the 2024 Ford C. Frick Award.
- On December 6, the team sent pitcher Ryan Ammons and cash to the New York Mets in exchange for pitcher Justin Slaten. Slaten was a Rule 5 pick from the Texas Rangers.
- On December 8, the team acquired outfielder Tyler O'Neill from the St. Louis Cardinals in exchange for pitchers Nick Robertson and Victor Santos.
- On December 9, the team signed catcher Alexander Mambel and pitcher Charlie Zink to minor league contracts.
- On December 11, the team invited non-rostees Helcris Olivarez, Frank German, Eddy Alvarez, Jorge Benitez, and Cam Booser to Spring Training. The team also signed second baseman Jamie Westbrook to a minor league contract and invited him to Spring Training.
- On December 13, the team signed free agent pitcher Cooper Criswell to a one-year, $1 million contract.
- On December 14, the team signed catcher Roberto Pérez to a minor league contract.
- On December 18, the team announced that three former players would be inducted to the Boston Red Sox Hall of Fame in May: Trot Nixon, Jonathan Papelbon, and Dustin Pedroia, the latter of which had already been announced as an inductee during his 2021 retirement ceremony.
- On December 19, the team hired former New York Yankees hitting coach Dillon Lawson as a hitting coordinator with a focus on the clubs upper minor-leaguers.
- On December 21, the team signed catcher Mark Kolozsvary to a minor league contract.
- On December 30, the team sent pitcher Chris Sale and cash to the Atlanta Braves for infielder Vaughn Grissom.

January–March 2024

=== January ===
- On January 2, the team claimed pitcher Max Castillo off waivers from the Kansas City Royals.
- On January 3, the team signed free agent pitcher Lucas Giolito to a one-year contract, with a player option after the first season—in a corresponding move, pitcher Mauricio Llovera was designated for assignment. A week later, Llovera was claimed off waivers by the Seattle Mariners.
- On January 11, the team agreed to one-year contracts with four players, avoiding arbitration: pitchers Nick Pivetta and John Schreiber, outfielder Tyler O'Neill, and catcher Reese McGuire.
- On January 15, the team signed Edwin Darville, Jorge Rodriguez, Felix Belisario, Jhiancarlos Diaz, Efren Teran, Juan Medina, Anderson Fermin, Gilbel Galvan, Justin Gonzales, John Alcantara, Emanuel Reyna, Madinson Frias, Kenyon Simmons, Cesar Muzziotti, Abis Prado, Yander Bonaci, Alexander Alzi, Jesus Travieso, Givian Sirvania, Jomar Fernandez, Enddy Azocar, Wilfre Hernandez, Shnaider Rojas, Justim Sojo, Ilam Fernandez, Moises Bolivar, Josue Brito, Tavano Baker, Angel Luis, Miguel Rivera, Rafi Montesino, Christopher Alvarado, Yahir Pena, Carlos Carrasquel, Samuel Arroyo, Davinson Reyes, Yoandys Veraza, Vladimir Asencio, Jhoan Peguero, Jose Golindano, Yohandry Gonzalez, Jesus Lugo, Avinson Pinto, Tejahri Wilson, and Edwin Brito to minor league contracts.
- On January 18, the team named its coaching staff for the 2024 season: the only changes (outside of previously announced moves) were the naming of Kyle Hudson as third base coach and Andy Fox as first base coach.
- On January 24, the team signed pitcher Melvin Adon to a minor league contract.
- On January 26, the team invited non-rostees Alex Hoppe, Justin Hagenman, Corey Rosier, Andrew Politi, Chase Shugart, Nathan Hickey, Chase Meridoth, Luis Guerrero, Stephen Scott, Nick Sogard, and Nick Yorke to Spring Training.
- On January 31, the team claimed utility player Romy González off waivers from the Chicago White Sox; in a corresponding move, pitcher Zack Weiss was designated for assignment. Weiss was later claimed off waivers by the Minnesota Twins. In addition, the team signed Shortstop Joe Dunand to a minor league contract.

=== February ===
- On February 2, the team acquired catcher Tyler Heineman from the New York Mets for cash considerations; in a corresponding move, the team designated pitcher Max Castillo for assignment. Castillo was later claimed off waivers by the Philadelphia Phillies. The team also signed pitcher Michael Fulmer to a minor league contract. Furthermore, former Red Sox general manager Theo Epstein joined Fenway Sports Group as a senior advisor.
- On February 4, the team signed pitcher Cooper Adams to a minor league contract.
- On February 6, the team signed shortstop Dalton Guthrie to a minor league contract.
- On February 8, the team added Melvin Adón, Joe Dunand, and Dalton Guthrie to the team's Spring Training roster.
- On February 9, the team signed pitcher Lucas Luetge to a minor league contract.
- On February 12, the team added pitcher Lucas Luetge to the club's Spring Training roster as a non-roster invitee.
- On February 17, the team traded relief pitcher John Schreiber to the Kansas City Royals in exchange for minor-league starting pitcher David Sandlin.
- On February 20, the team signed free-agent relief pitcher Liam Hendriks to a two-year contract; due to Tommy John surgery performed in August 2023, the timeline for Hendriks to pitch for the team was estimated to be after the All-Star break. The team also signed pitcher Jason Alexander to a minor league contract.
- On February 23, Phillip Sikes, Brian Van Belle, Karson Simas, Jordan DiValerio, Matthew Lugo, Nathan Landry, Chih-Jung Liu, Christian Koss, Zach Penrod, Alex Binelas, Niko Kavadas, Allan Castro, Nick Decker, Tyler McDonough, Juan Chacon, Blaze Jordan, Eddinson Paulino, and Zach Fogell were assigned to the team. The team also signed pitcher Joely Rodríguez to a minor league contract and invited him to Spring Training.
- On February 24, Nate Tellier, Brendan Cellucci, Ryan Zeferjahn, Dylan Spacke, and Andy Lugo were assigned to the team.
- On February 25, Cody Scroggins, Francis Hernandez, Elih Marrero, Kelvin Diaz, Theo Denlinger, Max Ferguson, Kristian Campbell, Tyler Miller, Mickey Gasper, Ahbram Liendo, Roman Anthony, Garrett Ramsey, Gabriel Jackson, Matt Donian, and Kyle Teel were assigned to the team.
- On February 26, pitchers Jacob Webb and Noah Song were assigned to the team.
- On February 27, pitcher Reidis Sena was assigned to the team.
- On February 28, catcher Juan Montero and third baseman Angel Pierre were assigned to the team.

=== March ===
- On March 1, second baseman Drew Ehrhard was assigned to the team.
- On March 2, pitchers Jason Alexander and Juan Daniel Encarnacion were assigned to the team, as were shortstops Luis Ravelo and Cutter Coffey.
- On March 3, the team added C. J. Cron to the club's 2024 Spring Training roster as a non-roster invitee. Furthermore, pitcher Cade Feeney was assigned to the team.
- On March 6, the team optioned pitcher Brandon Walter to the Worcester Red Sox. Shortstop Daniel McElveny was assigned to the team. Furthermore, the team reassigned Melvin Adón, Franklin German, Alex Hoppe, Helcris Olivarez, Nathan Hickey, and Stephen Scott to minor league camp.
- On March 7, the team signed a six-year contract with pitcher Brayan Bello with a club option for 2030. The team also reassigned Chase Meidroth, Corey Rosier, and Joe Dunand to minor league camp.
- On March 8, the team optioned pitchers Wikelman González and Luis Perales to the Worcester Red Sox.
- On March 11, the team signed one-year contracts with 25 players: Wilyer Abreu, Brennan Bernardino, Isaiah Campbell, Triston Casas, Kutter Crawford, Bobby Dalbec, Jarren Duran, Romy Gonzalez, Wikelman González, Vaughn Grissom, David Hamilton, Tanner Houck, Joe Jacques, Zack Kelly, Bryan Mata, Chris Murphy, Luis Perales, Ceddanne Rafaela, Pablo Reyes, Justin Slaten, Enmanuel Valdez, Brandon Walter, Greg Weissert, Josh Winckowski, and Connor Wong. The team also reassigned pitchers Luis Guerrero and Andrew Politi to minor league camp. Shortstop Marcelo Mayer and pitcher Robert Kwiatkowski were assigned to the team.
- On March 12, pitcher Felix Cepeda and catcher Ronald Rosario were assigned to the team.
- On March 14, pitcher Jonathan Brand and outfielder Albert Feliz were assigned to the team. In addition, Pitcher Bryce Bonnin signed a minor league contract with the team.
- On March 15, left fielder Jhostynxon Garcia was assigned to the team.
- On March 17, pitcher Conor Steinbaugh signed a minor league contract with the team. Outfielders Gilberto Jiminez and Eduardo Lopez were assigned to team as were pitchers Cooper Adams, Max Carlson, and Isaac Stebens.
- On March 18, the team optioned catcher Tyler Heineman and pitcher Joe Jacques to the Worcester Red Sox. The team also assigned Justin Hagenman, Chase Shugart, Jorge Benitez, Cam Booser, Nick Sogard, Jamie Westbrook, Nick Yorke, and Dalton Guthrie to minor league camp. Pitcher Wyatt Olds is also assigned to the team.
- On March 21, the team optioned David Hamilton and Romy González to the Worcester Red Sox.
- On March 22, the team optioned pitchers Cooper Criswell and Zack Kelly as well as third baseman Romy González and shortstop David Hamilton to the Worcester Red Sox; catcher Enderso Lira, pitcher Jeremy Wu-Yelland, and right fielder Miguel Ugueto are assigned to the team.
- On March 23, outfielder Bryan Gonzalez is assigned to the team.
- On March 24, the team signed free-agent pitcher Chase Anderson to a one-year, $1.25 million contract. In a corresponding move, Lucas Giolito was placed on the 60-day injured list. Furthermore, pitchers Caleb Bolden and Christopher Troye were assigned to the team.
- On March 24, the team announced that relief pitcher Joely Rodríguez would be added to the Opening Day roster, and the team released first baseman C. J. Cron—both had been non-roster invitees during spring training.
- On March 25, the team optioned pitcher Brennan Bernardino to the Worcester Red Sox. Pitcher Richard Fitts is assigned to the team. The team also released outfielder Gilberto Jiminez.
- On March 27, the team traded shortstop Christian Koss to the San Francisco Giants.
- On March 28, the team acquired pitcher Naoyuki Uwasawa from the Tampa Bay Rays for cash considerations.
- On March 28, The team selected the contract of Naoyuki Uwasawa from the Worcester Red Sox and assigned him to the FCL Red Sox. The team select the contract of Joely Rodríguez from the Worcester Red Sox. Pitcher Chris Murphy placed on the 60-day injured list. 2B Rob Refsnyder and SS Vaughn Grissom placed on the 10-day injured list retroactive to March 25. Pitcher Bryan Mata placed on the 15-day injured list retroactive to March 25.

=== Spring training ===
"Truck day", when the tractor-trailer carrying the team's equipment departs Fenway Park for Florida, was February 5. The team's first spring training contest was held on February 23, a 7–2 exhibition win over the Northeastern Huskies at JetBlue Park. The team's Grapefruit League schedule ran from February 24 through March 24, including games on March 9–10 against the Tampa Bay Rays at Estadio Quisqueya in the Dominican Republic, as part of MLB World Tour; the Red Sox won both games. The team concluded their preseason by winning two exhibition games against the Texas Rangers at Globe Life Field on March 25–26, for a final preseason record of 19–12, along with three ties.

== Regular season ==
=== Opening Day lineup ===
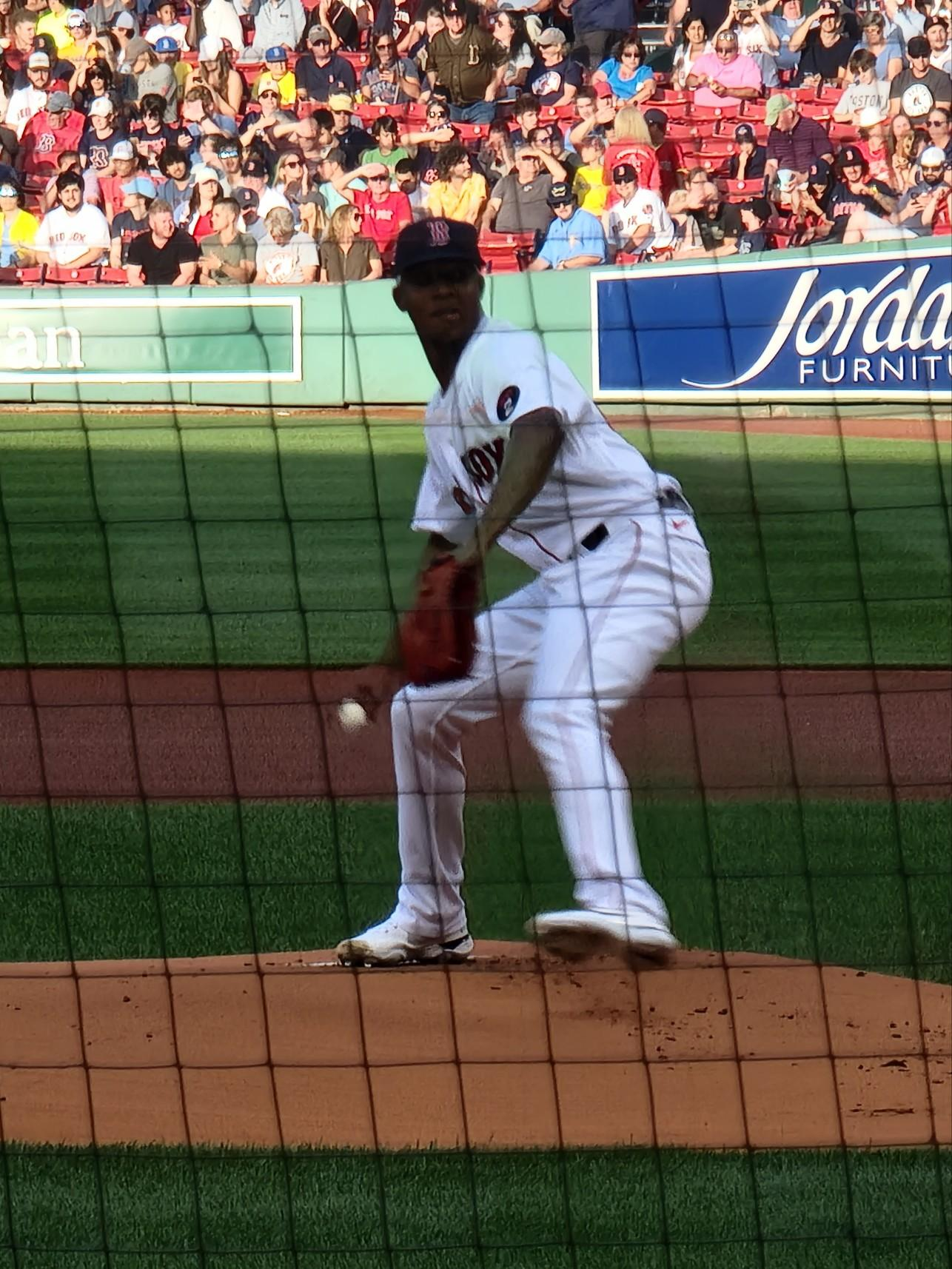
Opening Day starter Brayan Bello

Order	No.	Player	Pos.
1	16	Jarren Duran	LF
2	11	Rafael Devers	3B
3	10	Trevor Story	SS
4	36	Triston Casas	1B
5	17	Tyler O'Neill	RF
6	7	Masataka Yoshida	DH
7	43	Ceddanne Rafaela	CF
8	47	Enmanuel Valdez	2B
9	12	Connor Wong	C
—	66	Brayan Bello	P

March / April

=== March / April ===
On March 22, the team announced that the pitching rotation to begin the season would be: Brayan Bello, Nick Pivetta, Kutter Crawford, Garrett Whitlock, and Tanner Houck.

March 28–March 31, at Seattle Mariners

Facing the Mariners in Seattle to open the season, the Red Sox won, 6–4. Tyler O'Neill homered in his fifth consecutive Opening Day game, setting a major-league record. Rafael Devers also homered. Starting pitcher Brayan Bello allowed two runs on five hits in five innings, while recording two strikeouts, and earned the win. Kenley Jansen pitched a scoreless ninth inning for a save. Boston lost the second game of the series, 1–0. Starter Nick Pivetta held the Mariners to one run on three hits in six innings, but allowed a home run to J. P. Crawford and took the loss. Each team was held to four hits. The third game of the series went into extra innings after being tied, 1–1, through regulation. The Red Sox scored twice in the top of the 10th inning, but allowed three runs in the bottom of the inning for a 4–3 loss. Starter Kutter Crawford allowed one unearned run on three hits in six innings. Joely Rodríguez, the fourth of five Boston relievers, allowed three runs on two hits and took the loss. Ceddanne Rafaela had two hits and scored twice. The Red Sox earned a series split with a 5–1 win on Sunday. Starter Garrett Whitlock earned the win after allowing one run on three hits in five innings. Rookie Justin Slaten pitched the final 2 1/3 innings and earned his first major-league save. O'Neill was 2-for-3, including a home run. Enmanuel Valdez had a three-run homer.

Red Sox split the series 2–2 (14–10 runs)

April 1–April 3, at Oakland Athletics

The Red Sox opened a three-game series in Oakland with a 9–0 victory. Starter Tanner Houck held the A's to three hits in six innings and earned the win. Chase Anderson allowed only one hit in the final three innings and recorded a save. Jarren Duran had three hits and three stolen bases. The middle game of the series was tied, 4–4, after nine innings. After a scoreless 10th inning, Boston pushed across a run in the top of the 11th, then held Oakland scoreless in the bottom of the inning for a 5–4 win. Starter Brayan Bello had a no decision after allowing four runs on five hits in five innings. Five relievers then combined to pitch six scoreless innings, with Josh Winckowski earning the win. Trevor Story had three hits and two RBIs. Duran had another stolen base. Boston completed the series sweep with a 1–0 win, the only run of the game being driven in by Enmanuel Valdez. Duran had four hits. Starter Nick Pivetta earned the win after allowing five hits in five innings. Kenley Jansen earned the save.

Red Sox won the series 3–0 (15–4 runs)

April 5–April 7, at Los Angeles Angels

Boston opened a three-game series in Los Angeles with an 8–6 win. Starter Kutter Crawford had a no decision after allowing one run on two hits in 4 2/3 innings. The Red Sox then used six relief pitchers, with Chris Martin getting the win and Kenley Jansen earning the save. Tyler O'Neill had three hits, including two home runs. Jarren Duran, Triston Casas, and Reese McGuire also homered. Trevor Story left the game in the fourth inning after apparently suffering a shoulder injury while attempting to field a ball hit by Mike Trout. Story was placed on the injured list the next day. The middle game of the series was a 2–1 win by Los Angeles. Duran drove in a run to give Boston an early lead, but reliever Greg Weissert allowed two runs (both unearned) in the sixth inning and took the loss. Starter Garrett Whitlock held the Angels to four hits in 4 1/3 innings. The Red Sox won the final game of the series, 12–2. Starter Tanner Houck held the Angels scoreless on four hits in six innings, and earned the win. Chase Anderson allowed two runs on four hits in the final three innings and recorded a save. Four different Boston batters each had two hits. McGuire had five RBIs, three coming on a home run. O'Neill, Rafael Devers, and David Hamilton also homered.

Red Sox won the series 2–1 (21–10 runs)

April 9–April 11, vs. Baltimore Orioles

The Red Sox played their home opener at Fenway Park on April 9. Before the game, the Red Sox celebrated the 20th anniversary of their 2004 World Series-winning team, which broke the 86-year championship drought known as the "Curse of the Bambino". The pregame ceremony was also in memory of three players and executives from that team and their family members who had since passed away: knuckleball pitcher Tim Wakefield, who had died of brain cancer on October 1 at the age of 57, Wakefield's wife Stacy, who had died of pancreatic cancer on February 29 at the age of 53, and former team President/CEO Larry Lucchino, who had died of heart failure on April 2 at the age of 78. Tim and Stacy's children – their son Trevor and daughter Brianna – led the 2004 team in from left field, and Brianna threw the ceremonial first pitch to Jason Varitek, the current catching coach and game planning coordinator who was the captain and catcher of the 2004 team.

Boston lost their 2024 home opener at Fenway Park, 7–1. The Red Sox jumped out to a first inning lead thanks to another home run from Tyler O'Neill, but errors by Jarren Duran and David Hamilton contributed to the Orioles scoring seven unanswered runs. Bello, who took the loss, threw 89 pitches over 5 1/3 innings of work, giving up one earned and two unearned runs with three strikeouts.

Boston lost the second game against Baltimore, 7–5. Boston took the lead as they scored one run in the third inning on a fly ball by O’Neill that was misplayed and added two more in the fourth on a Connor Wong single. Triston Casas hit a two-run home run into the Green Monster seats in the bottom of the fifth. Starter Kutter Crawford earned his second no decision of the season after throwing five shutout innings with six strikeouts and four walks. Isaiah Campbell allowed four consecutive hits and three runs after relieving Crawford. Chris Martin threw two wild pitches in the seventh inning, giving up four runs, including a three-run home run as he took the loss. The consensus number-one prospect in baseball, Jackson Holliday, made his MLB debut for Baltimore, going 0-for-4 with an RBI. Former Red Sox closer Craig Kimbrel earned the save for Baltimore.

Boston lost the third game against Baltimore, 9–4 in 10 innings, suffering their first sweep of the season. Boston again took an early lead, going up 2–0 in the first inning off of a groundout from Masataka Yoshida and a double from Wilyer Abreu. Baltimore got a run back in the fifth inning thanks to a Colton Cowser home run. Anthony Santander hit a two-run home run off of Greg Weissert in the eighth inning after David Hamilton failed to touch second base on what would have been an inning-ending double play. Connor Wong hit a deep home run in the bottom of the inning to tie the game and send it to extra innings. Reese McGuire was ejected from the game after arguing balls and strikes, leading to the Red Sox giving up the designated hitter and clearing their injury-depleted bench as the 10th inning started. Gunnar Henderson hit a two-run home run, and the Orioles added four more runs to take a 9–3 lead. Duran hit a double to score a consolation run. Craig Kimbrel earned the win, while Isaiah Campbell took the loss.

Red Sox lost the series 0–3 (10–23 runs)

April 12–April 14, vs. Los Angeles Angels

A three-game series hosting the Angels began with a 7–0 loss for the Red Sox, who were held to three hits. Starter Tanner Houck allowed seven runs (four earned) on 12 hits in 5 2/3 innings. Boston's infielders committed three errors in the first three innings. The Red Sox won the middle game of the series, 7–2, powered by 11 hits including a home run by Triston Casas. Cooper Criswell was called up from Worcester to make his first start for Boston, and allowed two runs on five hits in four innings. Greg Weissert, the first of three Boston relievers, pitched two innings and earned the win. Boston won the final game of the series, played on Sunday afternoon, 5–4. Starter Brayan Bello earned the win after allowing two runs on six hits in 5 1/3 innings. Kenley Jansen allowed one run in the ninth inning but closed out the game for a save, striking out Luis Rengifo and Mike Trout with runners on second and third. Casas, Tyler O'Neill, and Masataka Yoshida each homered.

Red Sox won the series 2–1 (12–13 runs)

April 15–April 18, vs. Cleveland Guardians

The opener of a four-game home series facing the Guardians, which coincided with the 2024 Boston Marathon, was a 6–0 win for Cleveland. Boston was limited to three hits. Starter Kutter Crawford had a no decision after allowing no runs on two hits in 5 2/3 innings. Reliever Brennan Bernardino took the loss. Tyler O'Neill left the game after colliding with Rafael Devers while trying to catch a pop up; O'Neill later received eight stitches to close a cut. The Guardians won the second game of the series, 10–7 in 11 innings. Starter Garrett Whitlock had a no decision after allowing two runs on three hits in four innings. Boston was unable to hold a 6–5 lead in the ninth inning, as Kenley Jansen allowed a run on three hits for a blown save. Josh Winckowski, the last of six Red Sox relievers, took the loss after allowing three runs (two earned) on two hits in the 11th inning. Connor Wong, Triston Casas, and Enmanuel Valdez each homered. In need of a win to avoid losing the series, the Red Sox sent Tanner Houck to the mound in Game 3 against Cleveland. Houck twirled a complete game shutout—the first by a Red Sox pitcher since Nathan Eovaldi on October 4, 2022 (a rain-shortened five-inning contest)—while striking out 10 batters and allowing only three hits. Pablo Reyes scored from third base on a balk, Connor Wong hit a solo home run, and that was all the offense Boston required for a 2–0 win in a contest that took just 1 hour and 49 minutes. On Thursday afternoon, Boston was unable to split the series, losing the finale by a 5–4 score. No Red Sox batter had more than one hit; Jarren Duran had two RBIs. Opener Brennan Bernardino held Cleveland hitless in two innings of work. Cooper Criswell then allowed four runs (one earned) on three hits in 2 1/3 innings and took the loss.

Red Sox lost the series 1–3 (13–21 runs)

April 19–April 21, at Pittsburgh Pirates

The Red Sox opened a three-game series in Pittsburgh with an 8–1 win. Wilyer Abreu and Triston Casas had first-inning home runs; Ceddanne Rafaela and Rob Refsnyder also homered. Starter Brayan Bello earned the win after limiting the Pirates to one hit in six innings. Cam Booser made his major-league debut, allowing one hit and one run in the ninth inning. Boston won the second game of the series, 4–2. Starter Kutter Crawford earned the win after allowing one run on seven hits in six innings. Kenley Jansen earned his fifth save of the season, and 425th of his career, passing John Franco for sole possession of fifth place on the major-league all-time list. Masataka Yoshida had three hits including a home run. Boston completed the series sweep with a 6–1 win on Sunday afternoon. Starter Josh Winckowski allowed one run on three hits in 3 1/3 innings and had a no decision. Justin Slaten, the third of four Red Sox relievers, pitched two scoreless innings and earned the win. Abreu had three hits and two RBIs.

Red Sox won the series 3–0 (18–4 runs)

April 23–April 25, at Cleveland Guardians

A three-game road series in Cleveland began with a 4–1 loss. Boston starter Tanner Houck fell to 3–2 on the season after allowing two runs on five hits in six innings. The only Red Sox run came on a seventh-inning home run by Wilyer Abreu. Rob Refsnyder had three hits. The Red Sox collected 16 hits in the middle game of the series en route to an 8–0 victory. Starter Cooper Criswell earned the win after limiting the Guardians to three hits in five innings. Connor Wong had two home runs, Rafael Devers homered, and Abreu had four hits. Cleveland took the final game of the series, 6–4, largely due to a five-run second inning. Boston opener Chase Anderson allowed five runs on three hits in 1 2/3 innings and took the loss. Devers had three hits.

Red Sox lost the series 1–2 (13–10 runs)

April 26–April 28, vs. Chicago Cubs

The Red Sox opened a three-game series hosting the Cubs with a 7–1 loss. Boston's only run came via a home run by Tyler O'Neill. Starter Kutter Crawford took the loss after allowing four runs (three earned) on 10 hits in six innings. The middle game of the series saw the Red Sox collect 21 hits in a 17–0 victory. Ceddanne Rafaela homered and had seven RBIs, Masataka Yoshida had four hits, and O'Neill had three hits including a home run. Starter Josh Winckowski left after three innings; the win went to Justin Slaten, the second of four Boston relievers. Both teams used position players to pitch late in the game. It was the most runs scored in a shutout by the Red Sox since an 18–0 win over the 1954 Philadelphia Athletics. Televised on Sunday Night Baseball, Boston won the rubber match, 5–4, on a walk-off single by O'Neill. Starter Tanner Houck allowed one run on four hits in 6 2/3 innings and had a no decision. The win went to Kenley Jansen, who retired the side in order in the top of the ninth. Jarren Duran had a two-run triple in the sixth inning and scored the game-winning run in the ninth.

Red Sox won the series 2–1 (23–11 runs)

April 30, vs. San Francisco Giants

The Red Sox opened a three-game home series against the Giants with a 4–0 win. Starter Cooper Criswell earned the win after holding San Francisco to two hits in five innings. Jarren Duran and Wilyer Abreu each had three hits.

Boston exited April with a 17–13 record, in third place of the American League East, 2 1/2 games behind the Orioles.

May

=== May ===
The Red Sox entered May in third place of the American League East, with a record of 17–13, having just defeated the Giants in the opener of a three-game series.

May 1–May 2, vs. San Francisco Giants (cont'd)

The Red Sox won the second game of the series, 6–2, to secure the series win. Starter Kutter Crawford earned the win after holding San Francisco to four hits and two runs in seven innings. Connor Wong had three hits and Jarren Duran had an RBI triple. Dominic Smith collected an RBI single in his Red Sox debut. San Francisco took the final game of the series, 3–1. Boston was limited to four hits, with the team's only run coming on an RBI double by Tyler O'Neill that scored Rafael Devers. Starter Josh Winckowski had a no decision after allowing one run on two hits in 4 1/3 innings. Zack Kelly took the loss after giving up two runs on four hits in 2/3 of an inning. Zack Short made his Red Sox debut and struck out twice. Naoyuki Uwasawa made his MLB debut and held the Giants hitless in the final two innings.

Red Sox won the series 2–1 (11–5 runs)

May 3–May 5, at Minnesota Twins

The Red Sox suffered a 5–2 loss in the opener of a three-game series in Minnesota. Starter Tanner Houck fell to 3–3 on the season after allowing four runs (three earned) on six hits in six innings. Rafael Devers drove in both Boston runs and had two of the team's four hits. The middle game of the series was also won by the Twins, 3–1. Boston opener Brennan Bernardino allowed one run in the first inning, and was followed by four relievers. The loss went to Cam Booser, who allowed a run on two hits in 1 1/3 innings. Wilyer Abreu had two of Boston's eight hits, and drove in the only run. The Red Sox avoided being swept with a 9–2 win on Sunday, ending a lengthy winning streak for the Twins at 12 games. Four Boston batters had two RBIs each, including Devers and Ceddanne Rafaela, who each homered. Starter Cooper Criswell had a no decision after allowing one run on five hits in 4 1/3 innings. The win went to Bernardino, the first of five Red Sox relievers.

Red Sox lost the series 1–2 (12–10 runs)

May 7–May 8, at Atlanta Braves

A short two-game series in Atlanta opened with Boston losing, 4–2. Starter Kutter Crawford had a no decision after allowing two runs on five hits in six innings. Justin Slaten, the last of three Red Sox relievers, allowed two runs on two hits in one inning and took the loss. Ceddanne Rafaela had two hits and one RBI. Atlanta also won the second game of the series, 5–0, with former Boston pitcher Chris Sale pitching six innings and earring the win. Red Sox starter Nick Pivetta, freshly activated from the injured list, allowed five runs on seven hits in four innings and took the loss. Catcher Connor Wong was the only Boston player with two hits.

Red Sox lost the series 0–2 (2–9 runs)

May 10–May 12, vs. Washington Nationals

The first game of a three-game home series hosting the Nationals began with a 5–1 loss for the Red Sox. Starter Tanner Houck fell to 3–4 on the season after allowing three runs on six hits in seven innings. Catcher Connor Wong was the only Boston player with two hits. Garrett Cooper drove in Boston's only run. On Saturday, Boston won the middle game of the series, 4–2. Starter Cooper Criswell had a no decision after allowing two runs on three hits in five innings. The win went to Chris Martin, the third of four Red Sox relievers. Kenley Jansen recorded his sixth save of the season. Rafael Devers had two of Boston's six hits, and drove in two runs. Wilyer Abreu hit his third home run of the season. The Red Sox won the series with a 3–2 victory on Sunday afternoon. Starter Brayan Bello, just activated from the injured list, improved to 4–1 on the season by holding the Nationals to two runs on four hits in five innings. Jansen recorded another save. Cooper had two hits and Ceddanne Rafaela had two RBIs.

Red Sox won the series 2–1 (8–9 runs)

May 13–May 16, vs. Tampa Bay Rays

The Red Sox opened a four-game home series with a 5–3 loss to the Rays. Starter Kutter Crawford fell to 2–2 on the season after allowing four runs on seven hits in six innings. Tyler O'Neill had a three-run home run in the bottom of the first inning, accounting for all of Boston's runs. The second game of the series went to extra innings, with Boston starter Nick Pivetta taking a no decision after holding Tampa Bay to two runs on four hits in 5 2/3 innings. Tied after nine innings, 3–3, neither team scored in the 10th inning, and each team scored once in the 11th inning. The Red Sox then held the Rays scoreless in the top of the 12th, and Romy González drove in the winning run for a 5–4 Boston win. Brennan Bernardino, the last of five Red Sox relievers, earned the win. Ceddanne Rafaela recorded his fourth home run of the season. Tampa Bay won the third game of the series, 4–3. Red Sox batters had eight hits, but struck out 12 times. Starter Tanner Houck fell to 3–5 on the season, allowing three runs (one earned) on five hits in 5 2/3 innings. Rafael Devers and Wilyer Abreu each homered. The final game of the series was also won by the Rays, 7–5. Starter Cooper Criswell allowed five runs (three earned) on four hits in 3 2/3 innings, but escaped with a no decision. Kenley Jansen allowed two ninth-inning runs and took the loss. Jarren Duran had three hits, including a home run. Devers also homered.

Red Sox lost the series 1–3 (16–20 runs)

May 17–May 19, at St. Louis Cardinals

A three-game series in St. Louis opened with a 10–6 loss. Starter Brayan Bello fell to 4–2 on the season after allowing five runs on seven hits in 4 2/3 innings. Rafael Devers hit his seventh home run of the season. Connor Wong had four hits. The loss dropped Boston's winning percentage below .500, at 22–23 (.489). The Cardinals won the middle game of the series, 7–2, with five of their runs coming in the eighth inning. Red Sox starter Kutter Crawford had a no decision after allowing one run on six hits in 5 2/3 innings. The loss went to Justin Slaten, the second of three Boston relievers, who allowed five runs (four earned) on five hits in one inning. Devers again homered. The Red Sox avoided a sweep by winning Sunday's game, 11–3. Starter Nick Pivetta earned the win after allowing one run on one hit in six innings. Devers homered for the fifth straight game. Tyler O'Neill and David Hamilton also homered.

Red Sox lost the series 1–2 (19–20 runs)

May 20–May 22, at Tampa Bay Rays

Boston opened a three-game series at Tropicana Field with a 5–0 win. Starter Tanner Houck improved to 4–5 on the season by holding the Rays to two hits in seven innings. Rafael Devers set a new Red Sox team record by extending his consecutive-game home run streak to six. Ceddanne Rafaela also homered. The Red Sox won the middle game of the series, 5–2. Starter Cooper Criswell had a no decision after allowing two runs on six hits in 5 1/3 innings. The win went to Greg Weissert, the second of four Boston relievers. Kenley Jansen recorded a save. Jarren Duran had a home run and had a steal of home. Reese McGuire also homered. The Red Sox completed the series sweep with an 8–5 win on Wednesday, their first sweep of the Rays at Tropicana Field since 2019. Starter Brayan Bello improved to 5–2 for the season, having allowed three runs on four hits in six innings. Wilyer Abreu homered.

Red Sox won the series 3–0 (18–7 runs)

May 24–May 26, vs. Milwaukee Brewers

A three-game series hosting the Brewers opened with a 7–2 loss. Starter Kutter Crawford fell to 2–3 on the season after allowing six runs on seven hits in 4 1/3 innings. Jarren Duran and David Hamilton each had three hits. Dominic Smith homered. Milwaukee won the middle game of the series, 6–3. Boston starter Nick Pivetta fell to 2–3 on the season, having allowed five runs on seven hits in 3 1/3 innings. Ceddanne Rafaela had two hits and two RBIs. The Red Sox avoided a sweep with a 2–1 win on Sunday afternoon. Starter Tanner Houck had a no decision after allowing one run on seven hits in six innings. The win went to Justin Slaten, the second of three Boston relief pitchers; Kenley Jansen recorded his ninth save of the season. Wilyer Abreu had three hits.

Red Sox lost the series 1–2 (7–14 runs)

May 27–May 29, at Baltimore Orioles

The Red Sox opened a three-game series at Camden Yards with an 11–3 loss. Starter Cooper Criswell allowed seven runs (six earned) on six his in four innings and took the loss. Romy González drove in all three Boston runs. The Red Sox won the middle game of the series, 8–3. Starter Brayan Bello recorded his sixth win of the season, allowing three runs on five hits in five innings. Rafael Devers had four hits and drove in two runs. Rob Refsnyder and Wilyer Abreu each homered. Baltimore won the final game of the series, 6–1. Boston starter Kutter Crawford fell to 2–4 on the season after allowing five runs on four hits in six innings. Connor Wong had two hits, and Dominic Smith drove in the only Red Sox run.

Red Sox lost the series 1–2 (12–20 runs)

May 30–May 31, vs. Detroit Tigers

Hosting the Tigers for a four-game home series, the Red Sox lost the opening game, 5–0. Starter Nick Pivetta fell to 2–4 on the season after allowing two runs on three hits in 5 1/3 innings. He did tie a Red Sox franchise record, first accomplished by Roger Clemens, by striking out eight consecutive batters. Detroit starter Jack Flaherty did not allow a hit until the seventh inning. Rob Refsnyder and Reese McGuire registered Boston's only hits. Boston won the second game of the series, 7–3. Starter Tanner Houck improved to 5–5 on the season after allowing one run on three hits in seven innings. Ceddanne Rafaela had two home runs and five RBIs.

Boston exited May with a 29–29 record, in third place of the American League East.

June

=== June ===
The Red Sox entered June in third place of the American League East, with a record of 29–29, having just split the first two games of a four-game series hosting the Tigers.

June 1–June 2, vs. Detroit Tigers (cont'd)

The third game of the series was won by Boston, 6–3. The win went to starter Cooper Criswell, who allowed one hit on four runs in five innings. Enmanuel Valdez had three hits, including two home runs, and three RBIs. The final game of the series was an 8–4 Detroit victory in 10 innings on Sunday afternoon. Red Sox starter Brayan Bello had a no decision after allowing four runs on eight hits in 6 1/3 innings. The loss went to Cam Booser after allowing four runs (three earned) on four hits in the 10th inning. Rafael Devers hit his 11th home run of the season.

Red Sox split the series 2–2 (17–19 runs)

June 4–June 5, vs. Atlanta Braves

A two-game home series hosting the Braves began with an 8–3 loss. Red Sox starter Kutter Crawford fell to 2–5 on the season after allowing six runs (four earned) on five hits in six innings. Dominic Smith homered. The Red Sox split the series with a 9–0 win on Wednesday. Starter Nick Pivetta earned the win, allowing just one hit—a fourth-inning single by Austin Riley—in seven innings. Rafael Devers had two home runs; Jarren Duran also homered.

Red Sox split the series 1–1 (12–8 runs)

June 6–June 9, at Chicago White Sox

The Red Sox opened a four-game series hosted by the White Sox with a 14–2 win, amassing 24 total hits, including four each by Jarren Duran and Ceddanne Rafaela. Jamie Westbrook, Enmanuel Valdez, and Duran all homered. Starter Tanner Houck earned his sixth win of the season, having allowed two runs on three hits in seven innings. The loss set a franchise record of 14 consecutive losses for the White Sox. Boston lost the second game of the series, 7–2. Starter Cooper Criswell allowed four runs (three earned) on five hits in 4 1/3 innings and took the loss. David Hamilton had two stolen bases and Duran had a steal of home. The White Sox won the third game of the series, 6–1. Boston's only run was a home run by Bobby Dalbec in the fifth inning. Brayan Bello fell to 6–3 on the season, having allowed five runs on nine hits in 4 2/3 innings. The Red Sox avoided a series loss with a 6–4 win in 10 innings on Sunday. Zack Kelly, serving as an opener and the first of seven Boston pitchers, did not allow a hit in two innings of work. Kenley Jansen held the White Sox to one hit and no runs in two innings of work and got the win, with Cam Booser recording a save. Hamilton had two hits, including a home run.

Red Sox split the series 2–2 (23–19 runs)

June 11–June 13, vs. Philadelphia Phillies

Hosting the Phillies for three games at Fenway, the Red Sox lost the opener on Tuesday evening, 4–1. Rob Refsnyder had a sacrifice fly that accounted for Boston's only run. Starter Kutter Crawford allowed four runs (two earned) on six hits in six innings and fell to 2–6 for the season. Boston won the middle game of the series, 8–6. Jarren Duran had three hits and David Hamilton homered. Starter Nick Pivetta pitched four innings and had a no decision after allowing four runs on six hits. Cam Booser, the first of five Red Sox relievers, earned the win. Kenley Jansen earned his 10th save of the season. The Red Sox won the final game of the series, 9–3. Starter Tanner Houck earned the win, allowing three runs on eight hits in six innings. Brad Keller pitched the final three innings and earned a save. Tyler O'Neill hit a three-run home run.

Red Sox won the series 2–1 (18–13 runs)

June 14–June 16, vs. New York Yankees

The season's first Red Sox–Yankees rivalry matchup—a three-game series at Fenway Park—opened with an 8–1 New York win. Boston starter Brayan Bello took the loss after allowing five runs (four earned) on six hits in 4 2/3 innings. The Red Sox were limited to five hits, with Enmanuel Valdez driving in the team's only run. Boston won the middle game of the series, 8–4. Starter Cooper Criswell allowed two runs on three hits in four innings for a no decision. The win went to Justin Slaten, the first of four Red Sox relievers. Kenley Jansen recorded the final four outs for a save. Ceddanne Rafaela had three hits and Rafael Devers had two RBIs. Boston won the final game of the series, broadcast nationally on Sunday night, 9–3. David Hamilton had four stolen bases as the Red Sox set a single-game franchise record with nine total steals. Starter Kutter Crawford allowed three runs on three hits in six innings for the win. Rafaela again had three hits, and Connor Wong had three RBIs.

Red Sox won the series 2–1 (18–15 runs)

June 17–June 19, at Toronto Blue Jays

Boston opened a three-game series in Toronto with a 7–3 win. Starter Nick Pivetta improved to 4–4 on the season after allowing three runs on nine hits in seven innings. Kenley Jansen recorded the final out with two men on base for a save. Tyler O'Neill had two home runs, while Rafael Devers and Ceddanne Rafaela also homered. The second game of the series was also won by the Red Sox, 4–3. Rafaela had three hits and O'Neill again homered. Starter Tanner Houck had a no decision after allowing three runs (two earned) on six hits in 5 2/3 innings. The win went to Zack Kelly, the first of four Boston relief pitchers. Jansen again had a save. Boston completed a series sweep with a 7–3 win on Wednesday. Starter Brayan Bello improved to 7–4 on the season after allowing two runs on seven hits in six innings. Enmanuel Valdez and Jarren Duran both homered. Duran and Romy González each had two stolen bases.

Red Sox won the series 3–0 (18–9 runs)

June 21–June 23, at Cincinnati Reds

In Cincinnati, the Red Sox opened a three-game series with a 5–2 defeat. The loss went to starter Kutter Crawford, who allowed five runs (three earned) on five hits in 6 1/3 innings. Boston's scoring was limited to solo home runs by Connor Wong and Jarren Duran. In the middle game of the series, the Red Sox trailed 3–0 after three innings, but rallied to win, 4–3. Starter Nick Pivetta allowed three runs on six hits in 4 1/3 innings and had a no decision. Zack Kelly, the fourth of six relievers, got the win and Kenley Jansen earned his 14th save of the season. Dominic Smith homered. On Sunday, the Red Sox won the closing game of the series, 7–4. Opener Zack Kelly pitched 2 2/3 scoreless innings; the win went to Greg Weissert, the second of seven Boston relievers. Jansen again recorded a save. Wong and Rob Refsnyder each homered. Duran had three hits.

Red Sox won the series 2–1 (13–12 runs)

June 24–June 26, vs. Toronto Blue Jays

The Red Sox opened a three-game home series with a 7–6 come-from-behind win over the Blue Jays, secured with a Jarren Duran walk-off hit. Before the game, the Red Sox honored the Boston Celtics, who had won their NBA-record 18th championship in the 2024 NBA Finals a week earlier. Celtics head coach Joe Mazzulla threw out a ceremonial first pitch along with players Jaylen Brown, Jayson Tatum, Al Horford, Derrick White, and Kristaps Porziņģis. Starter Tanner Houck had a no decision after allowing three runs (two earned) on five hits in 6 2/3 innings. Kenley Jansen pitched a scoreless ninth inning and earned the win. Rafael Devers and David Hamilton both homered; Devers and Duran each had three hits. Boston lost the middle game of the series, 9–4, largely due to allowing Toronto to score seven runs in the third inning. Starter Brayan Bello took the loss after allowing seven runs on five hits in 2 1/3 innings. Devers and Tyler O'Neill each hit their 16th home run of the season.

The final game of the series was suspended after 1 1/3 scoreless innings due to rain on June 26—it was scheduled to resume on August 26 at Fenway. When the game resumed, it was won by Toronto, 4–1.

Red Sox lost the series 1–2 (12–19 runs)

June 28–June 30, vs. San Diego Padres

A three-game series at Fenway opened with a 9–2 loss to the Padres. Nick Pivetta took the loss after allowing five runs on seven hits in four innings. Ceddanne Rafaela had three hits and Rafael Devers homered. The middle game of the series was also won by San Diego, 11–1. Starter Tanner Houck fell to 7–6 on the season after allowing eight runs (seven earned) on nine hits in 4 1/3 innings. Boston's only run came on a homer by Jarren Duran. First baseman Dominic Smith pitched a scoreless ninth inning for the Red Sox. Boston avoided a series sweep by winning Sunday's game, 4–1. Starter Josh Winckowski held the Padres scoreless in five innings of work while allowing four hits to earn the win. Kenley Jansen recorded a save. Devers and Duran each homered.

Red Sox lost the series 1–2 (7–21 runs)

Boston finished June in third place of the American League East, with a record of 44–39.

July

=== July ===
The Red Sox entered July in third place of the American League East, with a record of 44–39, 8 1/2 games behind the division-leading Baltimore Orioles. The Red Sox began the month with a day off.

July 2–July 4, at Miami Marlins

Boston opened a three-game series in Miami with an 8–3 win. Starter Kutter Crawford earned the win, having allowed one run on three hits in six innings. Jarren Duran and Ceddanne Rafaela each homered. Masataka Yoshida had three hits. The Red Sox also won the middle game of the series, 7–2. Starter Brayan Bello improved to 8–5 on the season after allowing one run on seven hits in 6 1/3 innings. Five Boston batters had two hits each; Rafaela drove in three runs. Boston completed the series sweep with a 6–5 win in 12 innings on July 4. The teams played to a 2–2 tie through nine innings, then each scored two runs in the 11th inning before the Red Sox outscored the Marlins, 2–1, in the final frame. Starter Nick Pivetta held the Marlins scoreless in seven innings while only allowing one hit, and took a no decision. The win went to Zack Kelly with Greg Weissert earning a save. Tyler O'Neill had three hits and two RBIs.

Red Sox won the series 3–0 (21–10 runs)

July 5–July 7, at New York Yankees

Opening a three-game series in the Bronx, The Red Sox overcame an early 3–0 deficit and rallied to a 5–3 win in 10 innings. Masataka Yoshida hit a two-run home run with two outs in the ninth inning to tie the game, and Ceddanne Rafaela hit a two-run home run in the 10th inning to provide the winning margin. Romy González also homered. Starter Tanner Houck exited after 3 1/3 innings, having allowed three runs (one earned) on two hits and four walks. Justin Slaten, the third of four Boston relievers, got the win. Kenley Jansen recorded his 17th save of the season. The Yankees won the middle game of the series, 14–4, largely due to a seven-run fifth inning. Boston starter Josh Winckowski had a no decision after allowing three runs on five hits in 3 2/3 innings. The loss went to Brennan Bernardino, the first of three Red Sox relievers, who allowed two runs in two-thirds of an inning. He was followed by Greg Weissert, who allowed four runs in one-third of an inning. Rafael Devers hit his 19th home run of the season. On Sunday evening, Boston won the closing game of the series, 3–0. Scoring came via three solo home runs: two by Devers and one by Rafaela. Starter Kutter Crawford earned the win after limiting New York to four hits in seven innings. Jansen earned a save.

Red Sox won the series 2–1 (12–17 runs)

July 9–July 11, vs. Oakland Athletics

A three-game series hosting the Athletics at Fenway opened with a 12–9 Red Sox win. Each team had 13 hits. Starter Brayan Bello improved to 9–5 on the season after allowing five runs on nine hits in 5 1/3 innings; he struck out 11 batters. Dominic Smith and Wilyer Abreu each homered. Oakland won the middle game of the series, 5–2. Boston starter Nick Pivetta fell to 4–6 on the season, having allowed four runs on six hits in 6 2/3 innings. Jarren Duran had three hits and Rob Refsnyder homered. The Red Sox won the final game of the series, 7–0. Abreu, Connor Wong, and Masataka Yoshida each homered. Starter Tanner Houck held Oakland to two hits in six innings and earned the win. Chase Anderson pitched the final three innings to earn a save.

Red Sox won the series 2–1 (21–14 runs)

July 12–July 14, vs. Kansas City Royals

Boston's final series before the All-Star break began with a 6–1 loss to Kansas City. Starter Cooper Criswell fell to 3–4 on the season after allowing five runs (two earned) on eight hits in six innings. Ceddanne Rafaela drove in the only Boston run. The Red Sox won the middle game of the series, 5–0. Starter Kutter Crawford limited the Royals to two hits in seven innings and earned the win. Rafael Devers hit his 22nd home run of the season. Dominic Smith drove in two runs. Boston won the final game of the series, played on Sunday afternoon, 5–4. Smith and Devers each homered, while Jarren Duran had four hits and David Hamilton had three. Starter Brayan Bello improve to 10–5 on the season, allowing three runs on seven hits in 6 1/3 innings. Kenley Jansen pitched the final two innings and earned his 19th save of the season.

Red Sox won the series 2–1 (11–10 runs)

The Red Sox reached the All-Star break with a record of 53–42, in third place of the American League East, 4 1/2 games behind the division-leading Orioles. The team was in the third and final Wild Card position within the American League, with a two-game lead over the Royals.

July 19–July 21, at Los Angeles Dodgers

The Red Sox lost the opener of a three-game road series facing the Dodgers, 4–1. Jarren Duran, the MVP of the All-Star Game, homered for Boston's only run. Starter Nick Pivetta limited Los Angeles to two hits in six innings but had to settle for a no decision. Brennan Bernardino, who surrendered a grand slam to Freddie Freeman, took the loss. Boston also lost the second game of the series, 7–6 in 11 innings. Starter Brayan Bello had a no decision after allowing three runs on five hits in six innings. Kenley Jansen suffered a blown save after allowing a Kiké Hernández game-tying home run the ninth inning. Greg Weissert allowed three runs (one earned) on three hits during extra innings and took the loss. Tyler O'Neill had two home runs and four RBIs. On Sunday, the Dodgers completed a series sweep with a 9–6 win. Boston starter Kutter Crawford allowed six runs on seven hits in five innings and took the loss. Jansen allowed three runs in the bottom of the eighth inning, which turned out to be the winning margin. Duran had two hits, including a home run, and four RBIs.

Red Sox lost the series 0–3 (13–20 runs)

July 22–July 24, at Colorado Rockies

Note: Boston closer Kenley Jansen did not travel with the Red Sox to Colorado, due to issues experienced at Coors Field earlier in his career, related to Jansen having a heart condition and the high altitude of Denver.

The opener of a three-game series in Colorado took 12 innings to decide, with the Rockies winning, 9–8. Tied at the end of nine innings, 5–5, both teams scored twice in the tenth, followed by a scoreless 11th, and was decided by Colorado outscoring Boston, 2–1, in the 12th. Red Sox starter Tanner Houck allowed four runs on 10 hits in six innings and had a no decision. The loss went to Bailey Horn, who was charged with two runs (one earned) on one hit in two-thirds of an inning; Chase Anderson surrendered the winning hit. Jamie Westbrook and Connor Wong each homered. Alex Cora was ejected for the second time of the season. With a 6–0 win in the middle game of the series, the Red Sox ended their losing streak at four games. Starter Cooper Criswell earned the win, having held the Rockies to five hits in seven innings. Tyler O'Neill homered twice. In the closing game of the series, the Red Sox allowed 13 runs in the first four innings and committed four errors as the Rockies won, 20–7. Starter Nick Pivetta took the loss after allowing eight runs (seven earned) on 10 hits in 2 2/3 innings. Jarren Duran had three hits, including a home run.

Red Sox lost the series 1–2 (21–29 runs)

July 26–July 28, vs. New York Yankees

The Red Sox won the opener of a three-game series at Fenway against the Yankees, 9–7. Rob Refsnyder had three hits and Masataka Yoshida had three RBIs. Ceddanne Rafaela hit his 12th home run of the season. Starter Brayan Bello had a no decision after allowing three runs on five hits in five innings. The win went to Bailey Horn, the fifth of six Boston relievers. Kenley Jansen recorded his 20th save of the season. The Yankees won the middle game of the series, 11–8 in 10 innings. The Red Sox held a one-run lead in the top of the ninth, but the Yankees tied the score off of Jansen, handing him his third blown save of the season. New York then scored three times in the 10th, while holding Boston scoreless. Red Sox starter Kutter Crawford had a no decision after allowing five runs on eight hits in 4 2/3 innings. The loss went to Chase Anderson, the last of seven Boston relief pitchers. Tyler O'Neill had three hits, including two home runs, and drove in four runs. Wilyer Abreu also homered. On Sunday evening, the Yankees won the final game of the series, 8–2. Boston starter Tanner Houck fell to 8–7 on the season after allowing four runs (three earned) on five hits in six innings. Refsnyder and Connor Wong each homered.

Red Sox lost the series 1–2 (19–26 runs)

July 29–July 31, vs. Seattle Mariners

Boston opened a three-game home series with a 14–7 win over Seattle. Starter Nick Pivetta improved to 5–7 on the season after allowing three runs on six hits in 6 2/3 innings. Masataka Yoshida drove in four runs on three hits, including a home run. Dominic Smith and Romy González also homered. Seattle won the middle game of the series, 10–6. Starter James Paxton, in his return to the Red Sox, took the loss, having allowed three runs on six hits in 4 1/3 innings. Rafael Devers had three hits, including his 24th home run of the season, and drove in four runs. Boston won the series with a 3─2 victory. Devers drove in the winning run with a 10th-inning walk-off double off of the Green Monster, as reliever Zack Kelly got the win after starter Brayan Bello pitched 6 1/3 innings, allowing two earned runs on seven hits, striking out seven.

Red Sox won the series 2–1 (23–19 runs)

The Red Sox exited the month with a record of 57–50, still in third place of the American League East, and two games behind the Royals for the third and final Wild Card slot within American League standings.

August

=== August ===
The Red Sox entered August with a record of 57–50, in third place in their division and two games out of the final Wild Card spot for the American League—the team began the month with a day off.

August 2–August 4, at Texas Rangers

Opening a three-game series at Globe Life Field, Boston batters compiled 16 hits en route to an 11–6 victory. Red Sox starter Kutter Crawford earned the win after allowing five runs on six hits in 5 1/3 innings. Connor Wong had four hits. Rafael Devers, Ceddanne Rafaela, and Wilyer Abreu each homered. The Rangers won the second game of the series, 7–4. Boston starter Tanner Houck fell to 8–8 on the season after allowing six runs on eight hits in five innings. Rob Refsnyder had four hits including two home runs. The final game of the series, played Sunday afternoon, was won by Boston, 7–2. Starter Nick Pivetta had a no decision after pitching 4 2/3 innings, during which he allowed two runs on two hits. The win went to Cam Booser, the first of four Red Sox relievers. Abreu had two home runs and four RBIs; Jarren Duran had three hits, including a home run, and drove in two runs; David Hamilton also homered.

Red Sox won the series 2–1 (22–15 runs)

August 5–August 7, at Kansas City Royals

The Red Sox opened a three-game series in Kansas City with a 9–5 win. James Paxton earned the win after allowing two runs on five hits in six innings. Masataka Yoshida had four hits, while Jarren Duran had three RBIs. Romy González homered. Boston won the middle game of the series, 6–5. Starter Brayan Bello had a no decision after allowing three runs on five hits in 4 2/3 innings. The win went to Brennan Bernardino, the first of five Boston relievers; Kenley Jansen recorded his 21st save of the season. Yoshida had two hits, including a home run, and drove in three runs. The Red Sox were unable to complete a series sweep, losing on Wednesday night, 8–4. Starter Kutter Crawford fell to 7–9 on the season after allowing six runs on five hits in 3 2/3 innings. González and Danny Jansen each homered.

Red Sox won the series 2–1 (19–18 runs)

August 9–August 11, vs. Houston Astros

The Astros opened a three-game series at Fenway with an 8–4 win, largely due to batting around and scoring four runs in the seventh inning. Boston starter Tanner Houck had a no decision after allowing one run on four hits in six innings. He was followed by Lucas Sims, who allowed four runs on four hits in one-third of an inning and took the loss. Nick Sogard had two hits and scored two runs. Houston won the second game of the series, 5–4. Josh Winckowski, making a spot start for Boston, allowed one run on two hits in three innings. He was followed by Brad Keller, who took the loss after allowing three runs on six hits in four innings. Danny Jansen and Masataka Yoshida each homered. On Sunday afternoon, the Astros completed a series sweep with a 10–2 victory. Red Sox starting pitcher James Paxton left after two-thirds of an inning, due to a right-calf injury. He was followed by Lucas Sims, who took the loss after allowing one run on one hit in two innings. Ceddanne Rafaela was the only Boston batter with two hits. During Sunday's game, Jarren Duran was caught on broadcast audio using a homophobic slur towards a heckler; while both he and the team apologized, he was suspended for two games.

Red Sox lost the series 0–3 (10–23 runs)

August 12–August 14, vs. Texas Rangers

The Red Sox snapped a four-game losing streak with a 5–4 extra-innings win over the Rangers, opening a three-game home series. Starter Brayan Bello allowed one run on four hits in six innings and had a no decision. Josh Winckowski, the last of five relief pitchers, got the win after allowing one run in the top of the 10th, as Boston scored twice in the bottom of the inning. Rob Refsnyder had two hits and drove in the winning run. Boston won the middle game of the series, 9–4. Starter Kutter Crawford improved to 8–9 on the season, allowing four runs on three hits in 5 1/3 innings. Kenley Jansen recorded the final four outs and earned his 22nd save of the season. Connor Wong had two hits, including a home run, and three RBIs. On Wednesday evening, Boston was unable to complete the series sweep, losing 9–7 in 10 innings, despite holding a three-run lead with two outs in the ninth inning. Starter Tanner Houck allowed two runs on six hits in 6 2/3 innings. The Rangers tied the game in the ninth inning, with Winckowski allowing three runs on three hits. The tying runs came on a two-out three-run home run by Wyatt Langford, after the Red Sox infield was unable to turn a double play on a one-out ground ball. Zack Kelly took the loss, allowing two runs (one earned) on three hits in the 10th inning. Masataka Yoshida had three hits and Wilyer Abreu homered.

Red Sox won the series 2–1 (21–17 runs)

August 15–August 18, at Baltimore Orioles

A four-game series at Camden Yards opened with the Orioles winning, 5–1. Red Sox starter Nick Pivetta fell to 5–8 on the season, having allowed three runs on three hits in five innings. Boston's only run came on a home run by Wilyer Abreu. The Red Sox won the second game of the series, 12–10. Opener Brennan Bernardino did not allow a hit in two-thirds of an inning; he was the first of eight pitchers the Red Sox used. The win went to Cooper Criswell, who pitched 3 1/3 innings, although he allowed six runs on nine hits. Kenley Jansen recorded his 23rd save of the season. Masataka Yoshida had three hits, including a three-run homer, and four RBIs. Jarren Duran also had three hits, including a solo home run. Rafael Devers and David Hamilton also homered. Devers homered again in the eighth inning of Game 3, breaking open a 5–1 Red Sox win. The Devers long ball also completed three consecutive innings with Boston runs; Tyler O'Neill hit an RBI single in the sixth and Jarren Duran brought two runners home on an RBI single in the seventh. Brayan Bello improved to 11–5 over a six-inning outing in which he struck out six Oriole batters and was charged with just one run. On Sunday afternoon, the Orioles won the final game of the series, 4–2, despite being outhit by the Red Sox, 11–3. Boston starter Kutter Crawford fell to 8–10 on the season after allowing three runs on two hits in 5 1/3 innings. Rob Refsnyder homered.

Red Sox split the series 2–2 (20–20 runs)

August 19–August 21, at Houston Astros

Visiting Houston for three games, Jarren Duran opened the first game with a lead-off home run. While the Red Sox held a 4–2 lead midway through the sixth inning, the Astros rallied for a 5–4 win. Boston starting pitcher Tanner Houck allowed three runs (two earned) on eight hits in six innings, and had a no decision. The loss went to Kenley Jansen after allowing a walk-off home run to Yainer Díaz with one out in the ninth inning. Masataka Yoshida also homered for the Red Sox. The Red Sox won the second game of the series, 6–5. Duran again homered, one of his four hits, and had two RBIs. Triston Casas had two hits, including a home run, and three RBIs. Starter Nick Pivetta had a no decision after allowing five runs on six hits in five innings. Zack Kelly, the second of four Boston relievers, got the win, and Kenley Jansen earned his 24th save of the season. On Wednesday afternoon, Boston won the final game of the series, 4–1. Starter Cooper Criswell had a no decision after allowing one run on four hits in 4 2/3 innings. Josh Winckowski, the second of six Red Sox relief pitchers, got the win. Chris Martin earned his first save of the season. Ceddanne Rafaela had two hits and drove in two runs. David Hamilton homered.

Red Sox won the series 2–1 (14–11 runs)

August 23–August 25, vs. Arizona Diamondbacks

A three-game home series against the Diamondbacks opened with a 12–2 loss. Starter Brayan Bello took the loss after allowing five runs on seven hits in 5 1/3 innings. Rob Refsnyder homered. Arizona also won the middle game of the series, 4–1. Boston starter Kutter Crawford fell to 8–11 on the season after allowing two runs on three hits in five innings. Masataka Yoshida drove in the only Red Sox run. On Sunday afternoon, the Diamondbacks completed a series sweep with a 7–5 win. Red Sox starter Tanner Houck fell to 8–9 on the season after allowing six runs on seven hits in six innings. Boston's scoring all came via home runs—a solo shot by Triston Casas in the first inning, a three-run homer by Rafael Devers in the fourth inning, and a solo shot by Tyler O'Neill in the ninth inning.

Red Sox lost the series 0–3 (8–23 runs)

August 26, vs. Toronto Blue Jays (completion of June 26 suspended game)

A scheduled four-game home series hosting the Blue Jays opened with the completion of a suspended game from June 26. (Note: The suspended game was resumed and completed during the afternoon of August 26, prior to the first scheduled game of the four-game series, played during the evening of August 26. Note, however, that all statistics are recorded on the date a game starts—thus, statistics from the resumed game on August 26 were officially recorded as part of the June 26 game.)

Catcher Danny Jansen, who was batting for Toronto when the game was suspended, was traded to Boston on June 27. Jansen, who entered the game to catch for Boston when the game resumed on August 26, became the first player in major-league history to play for both teams in the same game.

Toronto won the suspended game, which had been scoreless in the top of the second inning when halted, by a 4–1 score. Kutter Crawford, who had pitched the first 1 1/3 innings for the Red Sox on June 26, was relieved by Nick Pivetta when the game resumed. Pivetta took the loss after allowing three runs (two earned) on four hits in six innings of work. Boston's only run came via a home run by Jarren Duran.

August 26–August 29, vs. Toronto Blue Jays (regularly scheduled series)

The Red Sox opened the regularly scheduled four-game series with a 7–3 loss. Opener Zack Kelly did not allow a hit or run in three innings, and received a no decision. Brad Keller, the second of four Boston relievers, took the loss after allowing five runs (three earned) on seven hits in four innings. Defensively, the Red Sox committed four errors. Jarren Duran had three hits, including a home run, and two RBIs. The second game of the series was won by Boston, 6–3. Starter Cooper Criswell had a no decision after allowing one run on five hits in 3 1/3 innings. Greg Weissert, the first of four Red Sox relievers, allowed no runs on two hits in 1 2/3 innings and got the win. Duran again homered, his 20th of the season. The third game of the series was won by the Red Sox, 3–0. Starter Brayan Bello held the Blue Jays to two hits in eight innings and improved his record to 12–6. Kenley Jansen retired the side in order in the ninth inning, earning his 25th save of the season. Tyler O'Neill homered and Masataka Yoshida had three hits. The Blue Jays won the final game of the series, 2–0. Boston starter Kutter Crawford took the loss after allowing two runs on six hits in 6 2/3 innings. The Red Sox were limited to two hits.

Red Sox split the series 2–2 (12–12 runs)

August 30–August 31, at Detroit Tigers

The Red Sox opened a three-game series in Detroit with a 7–5 win in 10 innings. After Boston built a 4–0 lead through six innings, the Tigers rallied for three runs in the eighth and one run in the ninth to force extra innings. Ceddanne Rafaela hit a two-run homer in the top of the 10th as Boston outscored Detroit, 3–1, that inning. Connor Wong and Jarren Duran also homered for the Red Sox. Starter Tanner Houck had a no decision after allowing no runs on three hits in six innings. Kenley Jansen had both a blown save and was credited with the win. Chris Martin pitched the 10th inning and earned a save. The second game of the series was won by Detroit, 2–1. Starter Nick Pivetta fell to 5–10 on the season after allowing two runs on six hits in six innings. Boston's only run was a homer by Tyler O'Neill.

The Red Sox finished August with a record of 70–66, in fourth place of the American League's wild card standings, with the top three finishers advancing to the postseason.

September

=== September ===
The Red Sox entered September with a record of 70–66, having just split the first two games of a three-game series in Detroit. With rosters expanding from 26 to 28 players, the Red Sox added pitcher Chase Shugart and infielder Enmanuel Valdez to their active roster.

September 1, at Detroit Tigers (cont'd)

On Sunday afternoon, the Tigers won the final game of the series, 4–1. Boston starter Cooper Criswell did not allow a baserunner in four innings of work, and had a no decision. He was relieved by Rich Hill, who allowed two runs on one hit in two-thirds of an inning and took the loss. Romy González had two hits. Jarren Duran drove in Boston's only run.

Red Sox lost the series 1–2 (9–11 runs)

September 2–September 4, at New York Mets

Boston's three-game series at Citi Field opened with a 4–1 loss on Labor Day. Red Sox starter Brayan Bello fell to 12–7 on the season after allowing four runs on seven hits in fix innings. Jarren Duran drove in Boston's only run, scored by Ceddanne Rafaela. The Mets won the middle game of the series, 7–2. Boston starter Kutter Crawford allowed two runs on one hit in six innings and fell to 8–13 on the season. Nick Sogard had both a hit and an RBI. On Wednesday evening, the Mets completed the series sweep, 8–3. Boston starter Tanner Houck took the loss after pitching five innings and allowing four runs on five hits—the four runs came via a first-inning grand slam by Jesse Winker. Although Boston closed to within 4–3 in the third inning, the Mets added four runs, charged to Kenley Jansen, in the bottom of the eighth. Jarren Duran had two hits and one RBI. The loss left the Red Sox with a .500 record, at 70–70, with 22 games left in the season.

Red Sox lost the series 0–3 (6–19 runs)

September 6–September 8, vs. Chicago White Sox

Boston opened a three-game home series hosting the White Sox with a 3–1 win. Starter Nick Pivetta had a no decision after allowing one run on five hits in six innings. Zack Kelly, the first of three Red Sox relievers, pitched one scoreless inning and got the win. Josh Winckowski retired the side in order in the ninth inning for a save. Ceddanne Rafaela had a two-run homer. The Red Sox won the middle game of the series, 7–5. Starter Cooper Criswell improved to 6–4 on the season after allowing two runs on six hits in five innings. Kenley Jansen earned his 26th save of the season. Trevor Story, in his return to the Boston lineup, had a hit and an RBI. Tyler O'Neill had two home runs and three RBIs. On Sunday afternoon, the White Sox won the closing game of the series, 7–2. Boston starter Richard Fitts, making his MLB debut, allowed two unearned runs on six hits in 5 2/3 innings and had a no decision. The loss went to Zack Kelly, the third of four Boston relievers, who allowed five runs on five hits in one-third of an inning. Both Red Sox runs came on solo homers, by Wilyer Abreu and Connor Wong.

Red Sox won the series 2–1 (12–13 runs)

September 9–September 11, vs. Baltimore Orioles

A 12–3 Boston win over Baltimore opened a three-game home series at Fenway. Starter Brayan Bello improved to 13–7 on the season after allowing two runs on three hits in 5 1/3 innings. Josh Winckowski pitched the final three innings for a save. Rob Refsnyder had four hits while Rafael Devers and Tyler O'Neill each had three. Refsnyder had two home runs and five RBIs; O'Neill had two home runs and three RBIs. The Orioles took the middle game of the series, 5–3. Red Sox starter Kutter Crawford fell to 8–14 on the season after allowing three runs on seven hits in 6 1/3 innings. Masataka Yoshida and Triston Casas each had an RBI. The Red Sox won the final game of the series, 5–3 in extra innings, on a three-run walk-off home run by O'Neill. Boston starter Nick Pivetta had a no decision after allowing one run on four hits in six innings. He was followed by four relievers, the final of which, Greg Weissert, got the win. The game was tied, 2–2, after nine innings, with Baltimore scoring once in the top of the 10th inning, prior to O'Neill's game-winning homer.

Red Sox won the series 2–1 (20–11 runs)

September 12–September 15, at New York Yankees

The Red Sox and Yankees opened a four-game series in The Bronx with an extra innings game, won by the Yankees, 2–1. Boston starter Cooper Criswell had a no decision, having allowed one run on four hits in 5 1/3 innings. The only Red Sox run came on a fifth-inning home by Danny Jansen that tied the game, 1–1. That remained the score until the home-half of the 10th inning, when the Yankees won on a walk-off single by Juan Soto. Josh Winckowski took the loss. The Yankees won the second game of the series, 5–4, largely due to a grand slam by Aaron Judge. Red Sox starter Richard Fitts allowed no runs on two hits in five innings and had a no decision. The loss went to Cam Booser, charged with two runs on one hit in one-third of an inning. Masataka Yoshida and Trevor Story each homered, while Jarren Duran had three hits. On Saturday afternoon, the Red Sox won the third game of the series, 7–1. Starter Brayan Bello improved to 14–7 on the season after allowing one run on four hits in 5 1/3 innings. Yoshida had two hits and three RBIs. New York won the final game of the series, 5–2. Boston starter Kutter Crawford allowed four runs on six hits in 4 1/3 innings and took the loss. Tyler O'Neill homered and Connor Wong had three hits.

Red Sox lost the series 1–3 (14–13 runs)

September 17–September 19, at Tampa Bay Rays

At Tropicana Field, the Red Sox lost the opener of a three-game series, 8–3. Starter Nick Pivetta fell to 5–11 on the season after allowing four runs on five hits in 4 2/3 innings. Boston's three runs came on a two-run home run by Triston Casas and a solo shot by Romy González. The defeat left the Red Sox with a losing record (75–76) for the first time since June 11 (33–34). Boston won the second game of the series, 2–1. Starter Tanner Houck had a no decision after allowing one run on four hits in four innings. He was followed by five relief pitchers, the third of which, Justin Slaten, earned the win. Kenley Jansen earned his 27th save of the season. Jarren Duran and Trevor Story each drove in one run, the latter via a home run. Tampa Bay won the final game of the series 2–0, holding Boston to a single hit, by Nick Sogard. Red Sox starter Brayan Bello took the loss, having allowed one run on five hits in 5 2/3 innings.

Red Sox lost the series 1–2 (5–11 runs)

September 20–September 22, vs. Minnesota Twins

Boston lost the opener of a three-game home series facing Minnesota, 4–2 in 12 innings. Red Sox batters struck out 20 times, tying a franchise record. Boston starter Richard Fitts had a no decision after holding the Twins scoreless for five innings, allowing five hits. Cooper Criswell took the loss, allowing three runs (two earned) on three hits while pitching the 12th inning. Connor Wong and Trevor Story each had two hits and an RBI. Saturday's game was rained out and rescheduled for Sunday at 5:35 p.m., to be played after Sunday's regularly scheduled game, which was moved to 12:35 p.m. In Sunday's first game, Triston Casas had three home runs and seven RBIs, much of Boston's offense in an 8–1 win. Starter Nick Pivetta improved to 6–11 on the season, allowing one run on four hits in five innings. In the second game on Sunday—the makeup of Saturday's rainout—the Red Sox won, 9–3. Starter Kutter Crawford earned the win, allowing three runs on eight hits in 7 2/3 innings. Romy González had a home run and a total of four RBIs. The win returned Boston to .500 on the season, at 78–78.

Red Sox won the series 2–1 (19–8 runs)

September 23–September 25, at Toronto Blue Jays

The Red Sox opened their final road series of the season with a 4–1 win over the Blue Jays. Starter Tanner Houck earned the win after holding Toronto scoreless on one hit in five innings. Wilyer Abreu had two hits and an RBI. Boston won the middle game of the series, 6–5, in 10 innings. Starter Brayan Bello allowed two runs on two hits in four innings and had a no decision. He was followed by seven relief pitchers, the fifth of which, Chris Martin, got the win. Chase Shugart earned a save. Vaughn Grissom had three hits and an RBI. The Blue Jays won the final game of the series, 6–1. Starter Richard Fitts took the loss after allowing four runs on six hits in five innings. Triston Casas drove in the only Red Sox run. The loss eliminated Boston from playoff contention.

Red Sox won the series 2–1 (11–12 runs)

September 27–September 29, vs. Tampa Bay Rays

The Red Sox entered their final series of the season with a record of 80–79, out of playoff contention but with an opportunity to finish with a winning record for the first time since 2021. The Rays won the first game of the series, 2–1. Boston starter Nick Pivetta took the loss after allowing two runs on four hits in 6 2/3 innings. Vaughn Grissom had three hits and Nick Sogard drove in the only Red Sox run, via a sacrifice fly. Boston also lost their penultimate game of the season, 7–2. Starter Kutter Crawford allowed six runs on five hits in 4 1/3 innings and took the loss. Triston Casas homered. On Sunday, the Red Sox won their final game of the season, 3–1. Starter Quinn Priester earned the win, having allowed one run on four hits in five innings. Justin Slaten closed out the game for a save.

Red Sox lost the series 1–2 (6–10 runs)

The Red Sox finished with a record of 81–81. The most recent time the team had posted a .500 record for a season was 1985.

== Season standings ==
=== American League East ===
AL East
Team	W	L	Pct.	GB	Home	Road
New York Yankees	94	68	.580	—	44‍–‍37	50‍–‍31
Baltimore Orioles	91	71	.562	3	44‍–‍37	47‍–‍34
Boston Red Sox	81	81	.500	13	38‍–‍43	43‍–‍38
Tampa Bay Rays	80	82	.494	14	42‍–‍39	38‍–‍43
Toronto Blue Jays	74	88	.457	20	39‍–‍42	35‍–‍46

=== American League Wild Card ===
Division leaders
Team	W	L	Pct.
New York Yankees	94	68	.580
Cleveland Guardians	92	69	.571
Houston Astros	88	73	.547

Wild Card teams (Top 3 teams qualify for postseason)
Team	W	L	Pct.	GB
Baltimore Orioles	91	71	.562	+5
Kansas City Royals	86	76	.531	—
Detroit Tigers	86	76	.531	—
Seattle Mariners	85	77	.525	1
Minnesota Twins	82	80	.506	4
Boston Red Sox	81	81	.500	5
Tampa Bay Rays	80	82	.494	6
Texas Rangers	78	84	.481	8
Toronto Blue Jays	74	88	.457	12
Oakland Athletics	69	93	.426	17
Los Angeles Angels	63	99	.389	23
Chicago White Sox	41	121	.253	45

=== Red Sox team leaders ===
Batting
Batting average†	Jarren Duran	.285
Hits	Jarren Duran	191
Runs scored	Jarren Duran	111
Stolen bases	Jarren Duran	34
Games played	Jarren Duran	160
Home runs	Tyler O'Neill	31
RBIs	Rafael Devers	83
Pitching
ERA‡	Tanner Houck	3.12
WHIP‡	Kutter Crawford	1.12
Strikeouts	Kutter Crawford	175
Innings pitched	Kutter Crawford	183 2/3
Games started	Kutter Crawford	33
Wins	Brayan Bello	14
Saves	Kenley Jansen	27
Games pitched	Greg Weissert	62

Updated through end of the regular season.
† Minimum 3.1 plate appearances per team games played
AVG qualified batters: Devers, Duran, Rafaela
‡ Minimum 1 inning pitched per team games played
ERA & WHIP qualified pitchers: Bello, Crawford, Houck

=== Record vs. opponents ===
==== Record vs. American League ====
2024 American League record Source: MLB Standings Grid – 2024
Team	BAL	BOS	CWS	CLE	DET	HOU	KC	LAA	MIN	NYY	OAK	SEA	TB	TEX	TOR	NL
Baltimore	—	8–5	6–1	3–4	2–4	2–5	4–2	4–2	6–0	8–5	3–3	4–2	9–4	5–2	7–6	20–26
Boston	5–8	—	4–3	2–5	3–4	2–4	4–2	4–2	3–3	6–7	5–1	4–3	6–7	4–2	8–5	21–25
Chicago	1–6	3–4	—	5–8	3–10	2–4	1–12	4–2	1–12	1–5	3–3	1–6	4–2	0–7	1–5	11–35
Cleveland	4–3	5–2	8–5	—	7–6	1–4	5–8	5–1	10–3	2–4	6–1	4–2	3–4	4–2	4–2	24–22
Detroit	4–2	4–3	10–3	6–7	—	2–4	6–7	3–4	6–7	2–4	3–3	5–1	5–1	3–4	5–2	22–24
Houston	5–2	4–2	4–2	4–1	4–2	—	4–3	9–4	2–4	1–6	8–5	5–8	4–2	7–6	5–2	22–24
Kansas City	2–4	2–4	12–1	8–5	7–6	3–4	—	5–2	6–7	2–5	4–2	3–3	3–3	1–5	5–2	23–23
Los Angeles	2–4	2–4	2–4	1–5	4–3	4–9	2–5	—	1–5	3–3	5–8	8–5	3–4	4–9	0–7	22–24
Minnesota	0–6	3–3	12–1	3–10	7–6	4–2	7–6	5–1	—	0–6	6–1	5–2	3–4	5–2	4–2	18–28
New York	5–8	7–6	5–1	4–2	4–2	6–1	5–2	3–3	6–0	—	5–2	4–3	7–6	3–3	7–6	23–23
Oakland	3–3	1–5	3–3	1–6	3–3	5–8	2–4	8–5	1–6	2–5	—	4–9	3–4	6–7	3–3	24–22
Seattle	2–4	3–4	6–1	2–4	1–5	8–5	3–3	5–8	2–5	3–4	9–4	—	3–3	10–3	2–4	26–20
Tampa Bay	4–9	7–6	2–4	4–3	1–5	2–4	3–3	4–3	4–3	6–7	4–3	3–3	—	1–5	9–4	26–20
Texas	2–5	2–4	7–0	2–4	4–3	6–7	5–1	9–4	2–5	3–3	7–6	3–10	5–1	—	2–4	19–27
Toronto	6–7	5–8	5–1	2–4	2–5	2–5	2–5	7–0	2–4	6–7	3–3	4–2	4–9	4–2	—	20–26

Updated with the results of all games through September 30, 2024.

==== Record vs. National League ====
2024 American League record vs. National League Source: MLB Standings
Team	AZ	ATL	CHC	CIN	COL	LAD	MIA	MIL	NYM	PHI	PIT	SD	SF	STL	WSH
Baltimore	2–1	2–1	0–3	3–0	2–1	1–2	1–2	1–2	1–2	2–1	1–2	1–2	1–2	0–3	2–2
Boston	0–3	1–3	2–1	2–1	1–2	0–3	3–0	1–2	0–3	2–1	3–0	1–2	2–1	1–2	2–1
Chicago	1–2	2–1	0–4	0–3	2–1	0–3	1–2	0–3	0–3	0–3	0–3	0–3	1–2	2–1	2–1
Cleveland	0–3	1–2	3–0	3–1	1–2	1–2	2–1	0–3	3–0	2–1	2–1	1–2	2–1	1–2	2–1
Detroit	2–1	0–3	1–2	3–0	2–1	2–1	1–2	1–2	2–1	1–2	2–2	1–2	1–2	2–1	1–2
Houston	2–1	0–3	0–3	0–3	4–0	2–1	3–0	2–1	2–1	1–2	1–2	1–2	1–2	2–1	1–2
Kansas City	1–2	1–2	1–2	3–0	1–2	1–2	2–1	2–1	1–2	1–2	2–1	1–2	0–3	3–1	3–0
Los Angeles	1–2	1–2	1–2	0–3	1–2	2–2	3–0	1–2	2–1	1–2	2–1	3–0	2–1	1–2	1–2
Minnesota	2–1	0–3	1–2	1–2	2–1	1–2	1–2	1–3	1–2	2–1	1–2	1–2	1–2	1–2	2–1
New York	2–1	1–2	2–1	0–3	2–1	1–2	2–1	2–1	0–4	3–0	1–2	2–1	3–0	1–2	1–2
Oakland	1–2	1–2	2–1	2–1	2–1	1–2	2–1	1–2	2–1	2–1	3–0	0–3	2–2	1–2	2–1
Seattle	2–1	2–1	1–2	3–0	2–1	0–3	1–2	1–2	3–0	2–1	1–2	3–1	2–1	2–1	1–2
Tampa Bay	3–0	1–2	2–1	2–1	2–1	1–2	3–1	1–2	3–0	0–3	2–1	1–2	2–1	1–2	2–1
Texas	2–2	1–2	2–1	2–1	0–3	2–1	2–1	0–3	1–2	0–3	2–1	1–2	1–2	1–2	2–1
Toronto	1–2	1–2	1–2	1–2	2–1	1–2	0–3	1–2	1–2	1–3	2–1	2–1	2–1	3–0	1–2

Updated with the results of all games through September 30, 2024.

== Roster ==
2024 Boston Red Sox
Roster
Pitchers: 48 Chase Anderson; 66 Brayan Bello; 83 Brennan Bernardino; 71 Cam Booser; 44 Isaiah Campbell; 50 Kutter Crawford; 64 Cooper Criswell; 80 Richard Fitts; 40 Luis García; 99 Luis Guerrero; 44 Rich Hill; 78 Bailey Horn; 89 Tanner Houck; 78 Joe Jacques; 74 Kenley Jansen; 46 Brad Keller; 76 Zack Kelly; 55 Chris Martin; 65 James Paxton; 67 Zach Penrod; 37 Nick Pivetta; 48 Yohan Ramírez; 56 Joely Rodríguez; 61 Chase Shugart; 39 Lucas Sims; 63 Justin Slaten; 39 Naoyuki Uwasawa; 57 Greg Weissert; 22 Garrett Whitlock; 25 Josh Winckowski; 61 Trey Wingenter	Catchers: 32 Tyler Heineman; 28 Danny Jansen; 3 Reese McGuire; 12 Connor Wong; Infielders: 36 Triston Casas; 28 Garrett Cooper; 29 Bobby Dalbec; 11 Rafael Devers; 77 Mickey Gasper; 23 Romy González; 5 Vaughn Grissom; 70 David Hamilton; 43 Ceddanne Rafaela; 19 Pablo Reyes; 18 Zack Short; 2 Dominic Smith; 75 Nick Sogard; 10 Trevor Story; 47 Enmanuel Valdez; 73 Jamie Westbrook	Outfielders: 52 Wilyer Abreu; 16 Jarren Duran; 17 Tyler O'Neill; 30 Rob Refsnyder; 7 Masataka Yoshida	Manager: 13 Alex Cora; Coaches: 53 Andrew Bailey (pitching); 62 Peter Fatse (hitting); 81 Andy Fox (first base/field coordinator); 84 Kyle Hudson (third base/outfield); 90 Charlie Madden (bullpen catcher); 88 Mani Martinez (bullpen catcher); 58 Luis Ortiz (assistant hitting); 85 Ben Rosenthal (assistant hitting); 33 Jason Varitek (game planning/catching); 60 Ramón Vázquez (bench); 51 Kevin Walker (bullpen)

== Player stats ==
= Indicates team leader

= Indicates league leader

=== Batting ===
Note: G = Games played; AB = At bats; R = Runs scored; H = Hits; 2B = Doubles; 3B = Triples; HR = Home runs; RBI = Runs batted in; SB = Stolen bases; BB = Walks; AVG = Batting average; SLG = Slugging average

Player	G	AB	R	H	2B	3B	HR	RBI	SB	BB	AVG	SLG
Jarren Duran	160	671	111	191	48	14	21	75	34	54	.285	.492
Ceddanne Rafaela	152	544	70	134	23	5	15	75	19	15	.246	.390
Rafael Devers	138	525	87	143	34	5	28	83	3	67	.272	.516
Connor Wong	126	447	54	125	24	1	13	52	8	28	.280	.425
Tyler O'Neill	113	411	74	99	18	0	31	61	4	53	.241	.511
Wilyer Abreu	132	399	59	101	33	2	15	58	8	40	.253	.459
Masataka Yoshida	108	378	45	106	21	0	10	56	2	27	.280	.415
David Hamilton	98	294	47	73	17	1	8	28	33	22	.248	.395
Rob Refsnyder	93	272	32	77	16	1	11	40	2	28	.283	.471
Dominic Smith	84	249	29	59	20	0	6	34	1	25	.237	.390
Triston Casas	63	212	28	51	8	0	13	32	0	30	.241	.462
Emmanuel Valdez	76	201	23	43	12	0	6	28	1	17	.214	.363
Romy González	89	199	25	53	10	1	6	29	11	12	.266	.417
Reese McGuire	53	139	10	29	3	0	3	18	3	13	.209	.295
Vaughn Grissom	31	105	10	20	3	0	0	6	2	7	.190	.219
Trevor Story	26	94	8	24	7	0	2	10	6	11	.255	.394
Bobby Dalbec	37	83	6	11	2	0	1	8	3	8	.133	.193
Danny Jansen	30	80	8	15	0	0	3	6	0	15	.188	.300
Nick Sogard	31	77	13	21	4	0	0	8	3	7	.273	.325
Garrett Cooper	24	70	3	12	4	0	0	5	0	3	.171	.229
Pablo Reyes	21	60	4	11	2	0	0	5	1	3	.183	.217
Jamie Westbrook	21	40	4	6	2	0	2	7	0	4	.150	.350
Mickey Gasper	13	18	1	0	0	0	0	0	0	4	.000	.000
Zack Short	2	7	0	0	0	0	0	0	0	0	.000	.000
Tyler Heineman	2	2	0	0	0	0	0	0	0	0	.000	.000
Team totals	162	5577	751	1404	311	30	194	724	144	493	.252	.423

Source:2024 Boston Red Sox Batting Statistics

=== Pitching ===
Note: W = Wins; L = Losses; ERA = Earned run average; G = Games pitched; GS = Games started; SV = Saves; IP = Innings pitched; H = Hits allowed; R = Runs allowed; ER = Earned runs allowed; BB = Walks allowed; SO = Strikeouts

Player	W	L	ERA	G	GS	SV	IP	H	R	ER	BB	SO
Kutter Crawford	9	16	4.36	33	33	0	183.2	155	97	89	51	175
Tanner Houck	9	10	3.12	30	30	0	178.2	156	75	62	48	154
Brayan Bello	14	8	4.49	30	30	0	162.1	157	84	81	64	153
Nick Pivetta	6	12	4.14	27	26	0	145.2	128	70	67	36	172
Cooper Criswell	6	5	4.08	26	18	0	99.1	103	52	45	31	73
Josh Winckowski	4	2	4.14	40	6	2	76.0	81	44	35	26	60
Greg Weissert	4	2	3.13	62	0	1	63.1	65	32	22	20	58
Zack Kelly	6	3	3.97	49	3	0	56.2	44	31	25	27	61
Justin Slaten	6	2	2.93	44	0	2	55.1	47	21	18	9	58
Kenley Jansen	4	2	3.29	54	0	27	54.2	38	20	20	20	62
Chase Anderson	0	2	4.85	27	1	3	52.1	46	34	28	19	35
Brennan Bernardino	4	3	4.06	57	3	0	51.0	50	25	23	22	56
Chris Martin	3	1	3.45	45	0	2	44.1	47	22	13	3	50
Cam Booser	2	3	3.38	43	0	1	42.2	41	17	16	16	43
Brad Keller	0	2	5.84	11	0	1	24.2	31	18	16	9	19
Richard Fitts	0	1	1.74	4	4	0	20.2	19	6	4	7	9
Garrett Whitlock	1	0	1.96	4	4	0	18.1	14	4	4	7	17
Bailey Horn	1	1	6.50	18	0	0	18.0	22	14	13	10	13
Luis García	0	0	8.22	15	0	0	15.1	24	15	14	1	13
Lucas Sims	0	2	6.43	15	0	0	14.0	11	10	10	10	9
Joely Rodríguez	0	1	5.93	14	0	0	13.2	19	13	9	2	12
James Paxton	1	1	4.09	3	3	0	11.0	13	8	5	2	9
Luis Guerrero	0	0	0.00	9	0	0	10.0	6	1	0	2	9
Chase Shugart	0	0	4.15	6	0	1	8.2	8	4	4	3	8
Isaiah Campbell	0	1	16.20	8	0	0	6.2	14	13	12	2	6
Quinn Priester	1	0	1.80	1	1	0	5.0	4	1	1	1	2
Naoyuki Uwasawa	0	0	2.25	2	0	0	4.0	2	1	1	2	3
Zach Penrod	0	0	2.25	7	0	0	4.0	3	2	1	4	3
Rich Hill	0	1	4.91	4	0	0	3.2	1	2	2	3	5
Dominic Smith	0	0	0.00	3	0	0	3.0	2	0	0	1	0
Trey Wingenter	0	0	27.00	2	0	0	2.1	5	7	7	2	3
Joe Jacques	0	0	5.40	1	0	0	1.2	3	1	1	0	2
Yohan Ramírez	0	0	13.50	1	1	0	1.1	3	3	2	0	1
Pablo Reyes	0	0	0.00	1	0	0	1.0	1	0	0	1	0
Team totals	81	81	4.04	162	162	40	1452.2	1363	747	652	461	1353

Source:2024 Boston Red Sox Pitching Statistics

=== MLB debuts ===
Red Sox players who made their MLB debuts during the 2024 regular season:

- March 30: Justin Slaten
- April 19: Cam Booser
- May 2: Naoyuki Uwasawa
- June 2: Jamie Westbrook
- June 29: Bailey Horn
- August 2: Nick Sogard
- August 12: Mickey Gasper
- August 15: Chase Shugart
- September 8: Richard Fitts
- September 8: Luis Guerrero
- September 14: Zach Penrod

=== Transactions ===
Notable roster transactions during the 2024 regular season:

==== April ====
- April 10: The team signed an 8-year contract with Ceddanne Rafaela with an option for 2032.
- April 18: The team acquired P Vladimir Gutiérrez from the Milwaukee Brewers for cash considerations. The team also transferred SS Trevor Story from the 10-day injured list to the 60-day injured list.
- April 19: The team designated P Joe Jacques for assignment and added P Cam Booser to the 40-man and active rosters.
- April 23: The Arizona Diamondbacks claimed P Joe Jacques from the Red Sox off waivers.
- April 27: The team acquired first baseman Garrett Cooper from the Chicago Cubs in exchange for cash considerations; in a corresponding move, Triston Casas was transferred to the 60-day injured list.

==== May ====
- May 1: The team signed free agent first baseman Dominic Smith and activated him for their game against the San Francisco Giants. Pitcher Vladimir Gutiérrez was designated for assignment. The team acquired infielder Zack Short from the New York Mets for cash considerations, and he was activated the following day.
- May 8: The team designated infielder Zack Short for assignment, optioned pitcher Naoyuki Uwasawa to Worcester, and activated pitcher Nick Pivetta and infielder Romy González from the injured list.
- May 9: The team traded infielder Zack Short to the Atlanta Braves in exchange for cash considerations.
- May 25: The team traded outfielder / infielder Pablo Reyes to the New York Mets in exchange for cash considerations.
- May 26: The team signed free-agent pitcher Brad Keller and optioned pitcher Zack Kelly to Worcester.

==== June ====
- June 2: The team placed Garrett Whitlock on the 60-day injured list.
- June 12: Pitcher Shane Drohan returned to the Red Sox from the White Sox.
- June 14: The team released Garrett Cooper.
- June 29: The team claimed pitcher Alex Speas of waivers from the Houston Astros.

==== July ====
- July 4: The team released catcher Roberto Perez.
- July 6: The team acquired pitcher Trey Wingenter from the Detroit Tigers for minor-league pitcher CJ Weins.
- July 9: Pitcher Naoyuki Uwasawa was designated for assignment; Trey Wingenter selected by the team; Enmanuel Valdez is optioned by the team and Jamie Westbrook is recalled.
- July 24: The team announced that it had signed manager Alex Cora to a three-year contract extension that runs through the 2027 season. Valued at $21.75 million, the deal makes Cora the second-highest-paid manager in MLB.
- July 26: The team acquired pitcher James Paxton from the Los Angeles Dodgers for minor-league infielder Moises Bolivar. The team also placed pitcher Bryan Mata on the 60-day injured list.
- July 27: The team acquired catcher Danny Jansen from the Toronto Blue Jays for three minor-league players. The team also signed free agent pitcher Calvin Bickerstaff out of Kent State University.
- July 28: The team claimed pitcher Yohan Ramírez off waivers from the Los Angeles Dodgers. The team also activated recent acquisitions James Paxton and Danny Jansen, while designating for assignment pitcher Chase Anderson and catcher Reese McGuire.
- July 29: The team traded minor-league infielder Nick Yorke to the Pittsburgh Pirates for pitcher Quinn Priester. The team also optioned pitcher Greg Weissert to Worcester and recalled pitcher Trey Wingenter from Worcester.
- July 30: On trade deadline day, the team acquired pitcher Lucas Sims from the Cincinnati Reds in exchange for minor-league pitcher Ovis Portes, and acquired pitcher Luis García from the Los Angeles Angels for minor-league players Niko Kavadas, Matthew Lugo, Yeferson Vargas and Ryan Zeferjahn. To open roster spots for Sims and García, pitchers Brandon Walter and Trey Wingenter were designated for assignment. The team sent Triston Casas on a rehab assignment to Worcester. The team sent Alex Speas to Worcester and activated pitcher Yohan Ramírez.

==== August ====
- August 2: The team outrighted catcher Reese McGuire and pitcher Yohan Ramírez to the Triple-A Worcester Red Sox, and released two pitchers previously designated for assignment, Brandon Walter and Chase Anderson. Pitcher Trey Wingenter was claimed off waivers by the Chicago Cubs. The team optioned Bailey Horn to Triple-A and activated Luis Garcia.
- August 12: Bello returned from the paternity list; James Paxton was placed on the injured list; Jarren Duran was suspended; Jamie Westbrook was designated for assignment; Brennan Bernardino and Brad Keller were optioned to Triple-A; Bailey Horn was recalled from Triple-A; the contracts of Mickey Gasper and Chase Shugart were selected from Triple-A.
- August 16: Dominic Smith was designated for assignment and Triston Casas was activated from the 60-day injured list; Chase Shugart was optioned to Triple-A and Cooper Criswell was activated from the COVID-related injured list.
- August 23: The team transferred James Paxton to the 60-day injured list, optioned Greg Weissert to Triple-A, and added Joely Rodríguez to the active roster. The team also sent Justin Slaten on a rehab assignment to Portland.
- August 26: The team designated Joely Rodríguez for assignment and selected the contract of Brad Keller from Worcester.
- August 27: The team selects the contract of Rich Hill.
- August 29: Brad Keller and Joely Rodríguez elect free agency.

==== September ====
- September 7: The team activated Trevor Story from the 60-day injured list and optioned Mickey Gasper to Worcester to make space for Story; the team also recalled Isaiah Campbell from Worcester and placed him on the 60-day injured list. The team also sent Cam Booser on a rehab assignment to Portland.
- September 8: The team selected the contract of Richard Fitts and designated Bobby Dalbec for assignment. The team also optioned Chase Shugart to Worcester and traded Eddy Alvarez to the Mets in exchange for cash.
- September 9: The team releases Rich Hill.
- September 16: The Toronto Blue Jays claimed Tyler Heineman off of waivers from the Red Sox.

=== Injuries ===
The following players sustaining injuries believed to be season-ending:

Player	Details
Lucas Giolito	In early March, Red Sox manager Alex Cora stated that Giolito would miss the start of the season due to discomfort in his right elbow.; In mid-March, it was announced that Giolito would have surgery and was expected to miss the entire season.
Chris Murphy	March 18: Murphy undergoes an MRI after experiencing elbow discomfort.; April 10: The team announces that Murphy successfully underwent Tommy John surgery and will miss the rest of the season.
James Paxton	August 11: Paxton exits a game in the first inning after sustaining a right calf strain.; August 23: Paxton is moved to the 60-day injured list due to the calf injury.
Trevor Story	April 5: Story exits a game after injuring his shoulder while diving to field a ground ball.; April 12: Story has shoulder surgery, expected to be season-ending.; September 1: Story plays for the Worcester Red Sox on a rehabilitation assignment.; September 7: Story returned to the Red Sox lineup, starting a game at shortstop.
Garrett Whitlock	May 16: Whitlock begins feeling soreness in his elbow after his May 15 outing with Worcester.; May 20: In a post-game interview, Alex Cora reveals that Whitlock has ligament damage.; May 25: Whitlock informs reporters that he will undergo surgery on his injured elbow and as a result will no longer pitch in the 2024 season.

Additionally, three players were added to the injured list in late September, effectively ending their seasons: Rob Refsnyder, Rafael Devers, and Kenley Jansen.

== Game log ==
In November 2023, the team announced which uniforms it would wear during the season:

- Home games: traditional white jerseys, except for Fridays (alternate red jerseys) and Saturdays (yellow City Connect jerseys)
- Away games: traditional grey jerseys, except for Fridays (alternate blue jerseys)
- In an exception to this schedule, the team wore their yellow City Connect jerseys for three games leading up to the Boston Marathon.

Red Sox Win	Red Sox Loss	Game postponed	Eliminated from Playoff Race

Note: Game numbering in some sources may differ, due to the suspended game of June 26, which was completed on August 26. Whether that game is included as part of the team's June record or August record, may also differ by source. The below table includes the outcome of that game (a Red Sox loss) in the team's record for August.

2024 Boston Red Sox Season Game Log: 81–81 (Home: 38–43; Away: 43–38)
March / April: 17–13 (Home: 6–8; Away: 11–5)

#	Date	Opponent	Score	Win	Loss	Save	Stadium	Attendance	Record	Box/ Streak
1	March 28	@ Mariners	6–4	Bello (1–0)	Castillo (0–1)	Jansen (1)	T-Mobile Park	45,337	1–0	W1
2	March 29	@ Mariners	0–1	Kirby (1–0)	Pivetta (0–1)	Muñoz (1)	T-Mobile Park	30,013	1–1	L1
3	March 30	@ Mariners	3–4 (10)	Saucedo (1–0)	Rodríguez (0–1)	—	T-Mobile Park	32,149	1–2	L2
4	March 31	@ Mariners	5–1	Whitlock (1–0)	Miller (0–1)	Slaten (1)	T-Mobile Park	29,331	2–2	W1
5	April 1	@ Athletics	9–0	Houck (1–0)	Boyle (0–1)	Anderson (1)	Oakland Coliseum	6,618	3–2	W2
6	April 2	@ Athletics	5–4 (11)	Winckowski (1–0)	Spence (0–1)	—	Oakland Coliseum	5,112	4–2	W3
7	April 3	@ Athletics	1–0	Pivetta (1–1)	Stripling (0–2)	Jansen (2)	Oakland Coliseum	6,436	5–2	W4
8	April 5	@ Angels	8–6	Martin (1–0)	Soriano (0–1)	Jansen (3)	Angel Stadium	44,714	6–2	W5
9	April 6	@ Angels	1–2	Detmers (2–0)	Weissert (0–1)	Estévez (3)	Angel Stadium	44,485	6–3	L1
10	April 7	@ Angels	12–2	Houck (2–0)	Silseth (0–1)	Anderson (2)	Angel Stadium	38,917	7–3	W1
11	April 9	Orioles	1–7	Burnes (2–0)	Bello (1–1)	—	Fenway Park	36,093	7–4	L1
12	April 10	Orioles	5–7	Baumann (1–0)	Martin (1–1)	Kimbrel (2)	Fenway Park	27,936	7–5	L2
13	April 11	Orioles	4–9 (10)	Kimbrel (2–0)	Campbell (0–1)	—	Fenway Park	26,230	7–6	L3
14	April 12	Angels	0–7	Detmers (3–0)	Houck (2–1)	—	Fenway Park	26,106	7–7	L4
15	April 13	Angels	7–2	Weissert (1–1)	Canning (1–1)	—	Fenway Park	31,878	8–7	W1
16	April 14	Angels	5–4	Bello (2–1)	Anderson (2–1)	Jansen (4)	Fenway Park	30,792	9–7	W2
17	April 15	Guardians	0–6	Herrin (1–0)	Bernardino (0–1)	—	Fenway Park	33,008	9–8	L1
18	April 16	Guardians	7–10 (11)	Clase (1–0)	Winckowski (1–1)	Barlow (1)	Fenway Park	30,133	9–9	L2
19	April 17	Guardians	2–0	Houck (2–1)	Lively (0–1)	—	Fenway Park	32,024	10–9	W1
20	April 18	Guardians	4–5	Carrasco (1–1)	Criswell (0–1)	Clase (5)	Fenway Park	35,494	10–10	L1
21	April 19	@ Pirates	8–1	Bello (3–1)	Priester (0–1)	—	PNC Park	17,959	11–10	W1
22	April 20	@ Pirates	4–2	Crawford (1–0)	Keller (2–2)	Jansen (5)	PNC Park	26,025	12–10	W2
23	April 21	@ Pirates	6–1	Slaten (1–0)	Pérez (1–1)	—	PNC Park	18,814	13–10	W3
24	April 23	@ Guardians	1–4	Barlow (1–2)	Houck (3–2)	Clase (7)	Progressive Field	13,543	13–11	L1
25	April 24	@ Guardians	8–0	Criswell (1–1)	Carrasco (1–2)	—	Progressive Field	13,916	14–11	W1
26	April 25	@ Guardians	4–6	Gaddis (1–0)	Anderson (0–1)	Clase (8)	Progressive Field	16,082	14–12	L1
27	April 26	Cubs	1–7	Imanaga (4–0)	Crawford (1–1)	—	Fenway Park	31,801	14–13	L2
28	April 27	Cubs	17–0	Slaten (2–0)	Brown (0–1)	—	Fenway Park	35,169	15–13	W1
29	April 28	Cubs	5–4	Jansen (1–0)	Leiter Jr. (0–1)	—	Fenway Park	32,052	16–13	W2
30	April 30	Giants	4–0	Criswell (2–1)	Webb (3–2)	—	Fenway Park	30,027	17–13	W3

May: 12–16 (Home: 6–8; Away: 6–8)

#	Date	Opponent	Score	Win	Loss	Save	Stadium	Attendance	Record	Box/ Streak
31	May 1	Giants	6–2	Crawford (2–1)	Jeffries (0–2)	—	Fenway Park	30,787	18–13	W4
32	May 2	Giants	1–3	Walker (3–2)	Kelly (0–1)	Doval (6)	Fenway Park	30,065	18–14	L1
33	May 3	@ Twins	2–5	Paddack (3–1)	Houck (3–3)	Durán (2)	Target Field	24,488	18–15	L2
34	May 4	@ Twins	1–3	López (3–2)	Booser (0–1)	Sands (2)	Target Field	23,587	18–16	L3
35	May 5	@ Twins	9–2	Bernardino (1–0)	Ryan (1–2)	—	Target Field	29,638	19–16	W1
36	May 7	@ Braves	2–4	Jiménez (1–0)	Slaten (2–1)	Iglesias (9)	Truist Park	38,142	19–17	L1
37	May 8	@ Braves	0–5	Sale (5–1)	Pivetta (1–2)	—	Truist Park	37,015	19–18	L2
38	May 10	Nationals	1–5	Corbin (1–3)	Houck (3–4)	—	Fenway Park	31,313	19–19	L3
39	May 11	Nationals	4–2	Martin (2–1)	Garcia (0–2)	Jansen (6)	Fenway Park	30,995	20–19	W1
40	May 12	Nationals	3–2	Bello (4–1)	Gore (2–4)	Jansen (7)	Fenway Park	29,250	21–19	W2
41	May 13	Rays	3–5	Eflin (3–4)	Crawford (2–2)	Adam (3)	Fenway Park	28,663	21–20	L1
42	May 14	Rays	5–4 (12)	Bernardino (2–1)	Rodríguez (0–1)	—	Fenway Park	32,893	22–20	W1
43	May 15	Rays	3–4	Bradley (1–1)	Houck (3–5)	Kelly (1)	Fenway Park	30,016	22–21	L1
44	May 16	Rays	5–7	Rodríguez (1–1)	Jansen (1–1)	Ramírez (1)	Fenway Park	31,704	22–22	L2
45	May 17	@ Cardinals	6–10	Gibson (3–2)	Bello (4–2)	—	Busch Stadium	37,961	22–23	L3
46	May 18	@ Cardinals	2–7	Romero (1–0)	Slaten (2–2)	—	Busch Stadium	40,690	22–24	L4
47	May 19	@ Cardinals	11–3	Pivetta (2–2)	Liberatore (1–2)	—	Busch Stadium	39,316	23–24	W1
48	May 20	@ Rays	5–0	Houck (4–5)	Bradley (1–2)	—	Tropicana Field	13,489	24–24	W2
49	May 21	@ Rays	5–2	Weissert (2–1)	Adam (2–1)	Jansen (8)	Tropicana Field	12,274	25–24	W3
50	May 22	@ Rays	8–5	Bello (5–2)	Lovelady (0–2)	—	Tropicana Field	13,095	26–24	W4
51	May 24	Brewers	2–7	Wilson (3–1)	Crawford (2–3)	—	Fenway Park	30,992	26–25	L1
52	May 25	Brewers	3–6	Rea (4–2)	Pivetta (2–3)	Megill (8)	Fenway Park	34,822	26–26	L2
53	May 26	Brewers	2–1	Slaten (2–1)	Peguero (4–2)	Jansen (9)	Fenway Park	34,078	27–26	W1
54	May 27	@ Orioles	3–11	Irvin (5–2)	Criswell (2–2)	—	Camden Yards	40,951	27–27	L1
55	May 28	@ Orioles	8–3	Bello (6–2)	Rodriguez (5–2)	—	Camden Yards	17,970	28–27	W1
56	May 29	@ Orioles	1–6	Burnes (5–2)	Crawford (2–4)	—	Camden Yards	18,857	28–28	L1
57	May 30	Tigers	0–5	Flaherty (2–4)	Pivetta (2–4)	—	Fenway Park	31,077	28–29	L2
58	May 31	Tigers	7–3	Houck (5–5)	Maeda (2–2)	—	Fenway Park	31,231	29–29	W1

June: 15–10 (Home: 8–7; Away: 7–3)

#	Date	Opponent	Score	Win	Loss	Save	Stadium	Attendance	Record	Box/ Streak
59	June 1	Tigers	6–3	Criswell (3–2)	Olson (1–6)	—	Fenway Park	33,806	30–29	W2
60	June 2	Tigers	4–8 (10)	Chafin (3–1)	Booser (0–2)	—	Fenway Park	34,662	30–30	L1
61	June 4	Braves	3–8	Fried (6–2)	Crawford (2–5)	—	Fenway Park	34,628	30–31	L2
62	June 5	Braves	9–0	Pivetta (3–4)	Schwellenbach (0–2)	—	Fenway Park	33,760	31–31	W1
63	June 6	@ White Sox	14–2	Houck (6–5)	Woodford (0–2)	—	Guaranteed Rate Field	15,568	32–31	W2
64	June 7	@ White Sox	2–7	Crochet (6–5)	Criswell (3–3)	Cannon (1)	Guaranteed Rate Field	19,684	32–32	L1
65	June 8	@ White Sox	1–6	Banks (1–2)	Bello (6–3)	—	Guaranteed Rate Field	26,248	32–33	L2
66	June 9	@ White Sox	6–4 (10)	Jansen (2–1)	Soroka (0–7)	Booser (1)	Guaranteed Rate Field	21,055	33–33	W1
67	June 11	Phillies	1–4	Wheeler (8–3)	Crawford (2–6)	Alvarado (12)	Fenway Park	35,004	33–34	L1
68	June 12	Phillies	8–6	Booser (1–2)	Ruiz (1–1)	Jansen (10)	Fenway Park	33,236	34–34	W1
69	June 13	Phillies	9–3	Houck (7–5)	Nola (8–3)	Keller (1)	Fenway Park	34,007	35–34	W2
70	June 14	Yankees	1–8	Gil (9–1)	Bello (6–4)	—	Fenway Park	35,024	35–35	L1
71	June 15	Yankees	8–4	Slaten (4–2)	Rodón (9–3)	Jansen (11)	Fenway Park	36,673	36–35	W1
72	June 16	Yankees	9–3	Crawford (3–6)	Stroman (6–3)	—	Fenway Park	36,718	37–35	W2
73	June 17	@ Blue Jays	7–3	Pivetta (4–4)	Kikuchi (4–6)	Jansen (12)	Rogers Centre	29,907	38–35	W3
74	June 18	@ Blue Jays	4–3	Kelly (1–1)	Little (0–1)	Jansen (13)	Rogers Centre	38,595	39–35	W4
75	June 19	@ Blue Jays	7–3	Bello (7–4)	Gausman (5–6)	—	Rogers Centre	38,906	40–35	W5
76	June 21	@ Reds	2–5	Abbott (6–6)	Crawford (3–7)	Díaz (17)	Great American Ball Park	37,146	40–36	L1
77	June 22	@ Reds	4–3	Kelly (2–1)	Wilson (1–1)	Jansen (14)	Great American Ball Park	31,803	41–36	W1
78	June 23	@ Reds	7–4	Weissert (3–1)	Lodolo (8–3)	Jansen (15)	Great American Ball Park	29,199	42–36	W2
79	June 24	Blue Jays	7–6	Jansen (3–1)	Pop (0–2)	—	Fenway Park	35,856	43–36	W3
80	June 25	Blue Jays	4–9	Gausman (6–6)	Bello (7–5)	—	Fenway Park	34,546	43–37	L1
—	June 26	Blue Jays	Suspended (rain); resumed and completed August 26							
81	June 28	Padres	2–9	Kolek (2–0)	Pivetta (9–5)	—	Fenway Park	33,540	43–38	L2
82	June 29	Padres	1–11	King (6–5)	Houck (7–6)	—	Fenway Park	33,003	43–39	L3
83	June 30	Padres	4–1	Winckowski (2–1)	Waldron (5–7)	Jansen (16)	Fenway Park	30,665	44–39	W1

July: 13–11 (Home: 7–5; Away: 6–6)

#	Date	Opponent	Score	Win	Loss	Save	Stadium	Attendance	Record	Box/ Streak
84	July 2	@ Marlins	8–3	Crawford (4–7)	Bellozo (0–1)	—	LoanDepot Park	14,676	45–39	W2
85	July 3	@ Marlins	7–2	Bello (8–5)	Rogers (1–9)	—	LoanDepot Park	20,285	46–39	W3
86	July 4	@ Marlins	6–5 (12)	Kelly (3–1)	Andriese (0–1)	Weissert (1)	LoanDepot Park	20,539	47–39	W4
87	July 5	@ Yankees	5–3 (10)	Slaten (5–2)	Kahnle (0–1)	Jansen (17)	Yankee Stadium	47,158	48–39	W5
88	July 6	@ Yankees	4–14	Hill (2–0)	Bernardino (3–2)	—	Yankee Stadium	45,504	48–40	L1
89	July 7	@ Yankees	3–0	Crawford (5–7)	Gil (9–5)	Jansen (18)	Yankee Stadium	45,250	49–40	W1
90	July 9	Athletics	12–9	Bello (9–5)	Estes (3–4)	—	Fenway Park	31,826	50–40	W2
91	July 10	Athletics	2–5	Sears (6–7)	Pivetta (4–6)	Miller (15)	Fenway Park	32,935	50–41	L1
92	July 11	Athletics	7–0	Houck (8–6)	Medina (2–4)	Anderson (3)	Fenway Park	33,512	51–41	W1
93	July 12	Royals	1–6	Ragans (6–6)	Criswell (3–4)	—	Fenway Park	34,894	51–42	L1
94	July 13	Royals	5–0	Crawford (6–7)	Lugo (11–4)	—	Fenway Park	32,378	52–42	W1
95	July 14	Royals	5–4	Bello (10–5)	Singer (5–6)	Jansen (19)	Fenway Park	35,351	53–42	W2
ASG	July 16	All-Star Game	NL 3–5 AL	Miller (1–0)	Greene (0–1)	Clase (1)	Globe Life Field	39,343	—	ASG
96	July 19	@ Dodgers	1–4	Yarbrough (4–2)	Bernardino (3–3)	Hudson (5)	Dodger Stadium	51,562	53–43	L1
97	July 20	@ Dodgers	6–7 (11)	Treinen (3–2)	Weissert (2–2)	—	Dodger Stadium	48,129	53–44	L2
98	July 21	@ Dodgers	6–9	Paxton (8–2)	Crawford (6–8)	Hudson (6)	Dodger Stadium	50,824	53–45	L3
99	July 22	@ Rockies	8–9 (12)	Lawrence (3–3)	Horn (0–1)	—	Coors Field	35,261	53–46	L4
100	July 23	@ Rockies	6–0	Criswell (4–4)	Blach (3–6)	—	Coors Field	36,553	54–46	W1
101	July 24	@ Rockies	7–20	Quantrill (7–7)	Pivetta (4–7)	—	Coors Field	36,579	54–47	L1
102	July 26	Yankees	9–7	Horn (1–1)	Weaver (4–2)	Jansen (20)	Fenway Park	36,661	55–47	W1
103	July 27	Yankees	8–11 (10)	Holmes (2–4)	Anderson (0–2)	—	Fenway Park	36,711	55–48	L1
104	July 28	Yankees	2–8	Rodón (11–7)	Houck (8–7)	—	Fenway Park	36,410	55–49	L2
105	July 29	Mariners	14–7	Pivetta (5–7)	Gilbert (6–7)	—	Fenway Park	35,007	56–49	W1
106	July 30	Mariners	6–10	Castillo (9–10)	Paxton (8–3)	—	Fenway Park	36,592	56–50	L1
107	July 31	Mariners	3–2 (10)	Kelly (4–1)	Díaz (0–1)	—	Fenway Park	34,643	57–50	W1

August: 13–16 (Home: 4–10; Away: 9–6)

#	Date	Opponent	Score	Win	Loss	Save	Stadium	Attendance	Record	Box/ Streak
108	August 2	@ Rangers	11–6	Crawford (7–8)	Ureña (3–6)	—	Globe Life Field	35,669	58–50	W2
109	August 3	@ Rangers	4–7	Leclerc (5–4)	Houck (8–8)	Yates (20)	Globe Life Field	39,414	58–51	L1
110	August 4	@ Rangers	7–2	Booser (2–2)	Eovaldi (8–5)	—	Globe Life Field	34,532	59–51	W1
111	August 5	@ Royals	9–5	Paxton (8–3)	Singer (8–7)	—	Kauffman Stadium	20,087	60–51	W2
112	August 6	@ Royals	6–5	Bernardino (4–3)	Lugo (13–6)	Jansen (21)	Kauffman Stadium	21,386	61–51	W3
113	August 7	@ Royals	4–8	Ragans (9–7)	Crawford (7–9)	—	Kauffman Stadium	16,550	61–52	L1
114	August 9	Astros	4–8	Ort (1–0)	Sims (1–5)	—	Fenway Park	32,898	61–53	L2
115	August 10	Astros	4–5	Arrighetti (5–10)	Keller (0–3)	Hader (25)	Fenway Park	35,443	61–54	L3
116	August 11	Astros	2–10	Brown (10–7)	Sims (1–6)	—	Fenway Park	31,762	61–55	L4
117	August 12	Rangers	5–4 (10)	Winckowski (3–1)	Garabito (0–1)	—	Fenway Park	35,715	62–55	W1
118	August 13	Rangers	9–4	Crawford (8–9)	Ureña (3–8)	Jansen (22)	Fenway Park	34,522	63–55	W2
119	August 14	Rangers	7–9 (10)	Festa (1–1)	Kelly (4–2)	Yates (21)	Fenway Park	35,366	63–56	L1
120	August 15	@ Orioles	1–5	Eflin (9–7)	Pivetta (5–8)	—	Camden Yards	25,445	63–57	L2
121	August 16	@ Orioles	12–10	Criswell (5–4)	Burnes (12–5)	Jansen (23)	Camden Yards	34,541	64–57	W1
122	August 17	@ Orioles	5–1	Bello (11–5)	Povich (1–6)	—	Camden Yards	38,921	65–57	W2
123	August 18	@ Orioles	2–4	Suárez (6–4)	Crawford (8–10)	Domínguez (4)	Camden Yards	27,104	65–58	L1
124	August 19	@ Astros	4–5	Hader (6–6)	Jansen (3–2)	—	Minute Maid Park	33,409	65–59	L2
125	August 20	@ Astros	6–5	Kelly (5–2)	Ort (1–1)	Jansen (24)	Minute Maid Park	34,436	66–59	W1
126	August 21	@ Astros	4–1	Winckowski (4–1)	Verlander (3–3)	Martin (1)	Minute Maid Park	31,954	67–59	W2
127	August 23	Diamondbacks	2–12	Nelson (9–6)	Bello (11–6)	—	Fenway Park	32,016	67–60	L1
128	August 24	Diamondbacks	1–4	Gallen (10–6)	Crawford (8–11)	—	Fenway Park	35,528	67–61	L2
129	August 25	Diamondbacks	5–7	Kelly (4–0)	Houck (8–9)	—	Fenway Park	31,453	67–62	L3
130	August 26 (Note: Conclusion of June 26 suspended game)	Blue Jays	1–4	Pop (1–2)	Pivetta (4–5)	Green (3)	Fenway Park	34,756	67–63	L4
131	August 26 (Note: Regularly-scheduled game)	Blue Jays	3–7	Berríos (13–9)	Keller (0–4)	Little (1)	Fenway Park	29,097	67–64	L5
132	August 27	Blue Jays	6–3	Weissert (3–2)	Rodríguez (1–6)	—	Fenway Park	29,634	68–64	W1
133	August 28	Blue Jays	3–0	Bello (12–9)	Bassitt (9–13)	Jansen (25)	Fenway Park	32,809	69–64	W2
134	August 29	Blue Jays	0–2	Francis (8–3)	Crawford (8–12)	Green (16)	Fenway Park	31,712	69–65	L1
135	August 30	@ Tigers	7–5 (10)	Jansen (4–2)	Miller (6–8)	Martin (2)	Comerica Park	25,207	70–65	W1
136	August 31	@ Tigers	1–2	Skubal (16–4)	Pivetta (5–10)	Holton (6)	Comerica Park	34,355	70–66	L1

September: 11–15 (Home: 7–5; Away: 4–10)

#	Date	Opponent	Score	Win	Loss	Save	Stadium	Attendance	Record	Box/ Streak
137	September 1	@ Tigers	1–4	Hurter (3–1)	Hill (0–1)	Foley (20)	Comerica Park	30,173	70–67	L2
138	September 2	@ Mets	1–4	Severino (10–6)	Bello (12–7)	Maton (3)	Citi Field	35,064	70–68	L3
139	September 3	@ Mets	2–7	Peterson (9–1)	Crawford (8–13)	—	Citi Field	29,400	70–69	L4
140	September 4	@ Mets	3–8	Young (3–0)	Houck (8–10)	—	Citi Field	26,270	70–70	L5
141	September 6	White Sox	3–1	Kelly (6–2)	Foster (0–1)	Winckowski (1)	Fenway Park	32,625	71–70	W1
142	September 7	White Sox	7–5	Criswell (6–4)	Crochet (6–11)	Jansen (26)	Fenway Park	31,691	72–70	W2
143	September 8	White Sox	2–7	Ellard (2–2)	Kelly (6–3)	—	Fenway Park	29,110	72–71	L1
144	September 9	Orioles	12–3	Bello (13–7)	Povich (2–8)	Winckowski (2)	Fenway Park	30,600	73–71	W1
145	September 10	Orioles	3–5	Suárez (8–5)	Crawford (8–14)	Domínguez (10)	Fenway Park	30,898	73–72	L1
146	September 11	Orioles	5–3 (10)	Weissert (4–2)	Akin (3–1)	—	Fenway Park	32,448	74–72	W1
147	September 12	@ Yankees	1–2 (10)	Holmes (3–5)	Winckowski (4–2)	—	Yankee Stadium	40,229	74–73	L1
148	September 13	@ Yankees	4–5	Leiter Jr. (4–5)	Booser (2–3)	Weaver (2)	Yankee Stadium	45,292	74–74	L2
149	September 14	@ Yankees	7–1	Bello (14–7)	Cole (6–5)	—	Yankee Stadium	46,378	75–74	W1
150	September 15	@ Yankees	2–5	Rodón (15–9)	Crawford (8–15)	Kahnle (1)	Yankee Stadium	45,552	75–75	L1
151	September 17	@ Rays	3–8	Baz (3–3)	Pivetta (5–11)	—	Tropicana Field	12,169	75–76	L2
152	September 18	@ Rays	2–1	Slaten (6–2)	Rasmussen (0–2)	Jansen (27)	Tropicana Field	12,153	76–76	W1
153	September 19	@ Rays	0–2	Littell (8–9)	Bello (14–8)	Cleavinger (6)	Tropicana Field	13,120	76–77	L1
154	September 20	Twins	2–4 (12)	Blewett (1–0)	Criswell (6–5)	Jax (10)	Fenway Park	33,052	76–78	L2
—	September 21	Twins	Postponed (rain); Makeup: September 22							
155	September 22 (1)	Twins	8–1	Pivetta (6–11)	López (15–9)	—	Fenway Park	32,307	77–78	W1
156	September 22 (2)	Twins	9–3	Crawford (9–15)	Irvin (6–6)	—	Fenway Park	31,941	78–78	W2
157	September 23	@ Blue Jays	4–1	Houck (9–10)	Bassitt (10–14)	—	Rogers Centre	22,254	79–78	W3
158	September 24	@ Blue Jays	6–5 (10)	Martin (3–1)	Nance (0–3)	Shugart (1)	Rogers Centre	29,178	80–78	W4
159	September 25	@ Blue Jays	1–6	Gausman (14–11)	Fitts (0–1)	—	Rogers Centre	27,694	80–79	L1
160	September 27	Rays	1–2	Bradley (8–11)	Pivetta (6–12)	Uceta (5)	Fenway Park	33,694	80–80	L2
161	September 28	Rays	2–7	Baz (4–3)	Crawford (9–16)	—	Fenway Park	35,333	80–81	L3
162	September 29	Rays	3–1	Priester (3–6)	Pepiot (8–8)	Slaten (2)	Fenway Park	34,862	81–81	W1

=== Grand slams ===
No.	Date	Red Sox batter	H/A	Pitcher	Opposing team	Ref.
None

=== Ejections ===
No.	Date	Red Sox personnel	H/A	Opposing team	Ref.
1	April 11	Reese McGuire	Home	Baltimore Orioles	
2	June 8	Alex Cora	Away	Chicago White Sox	
3	July 22	Alex Cora	Away	Colorado Rockies	
4	August 26	Wilyer Abreu	Home	Toronto Blue Jays	
5	September 22†	Alex Cora	Home	Minnesota Twins	

† First game of doubleheader

== Awards and honors ==
Recipient	Award	Date awarded	Ref.
Rafael Devers†	All-Star Reserve	July 7, 2024	
Jarren Duran	All-Star Reserve	July 7, 2024	
Tanner Houck	All-Star Reserve	July 7, 2024	
Jarren Duran	All-Star Game MVP	July 16, 2024	
Tyler O'Neill	AL Player of the Week (July 22–28)	July 29, 2024	
Tyler O'Neill	MLBPA AL Comeback Player of the Year	October 26, 2024	
Wilyer Abreu	Fielding Bible Award (RF)	October 24, 2024	
Wilyer Abreu	AL Gold Glove Award (RF)	November 3, 2024	
Cam Booser	Tony Conigliaro Award	November 25, 2024	

† Devers opted out of the All-Star Game to rest his left shoulder.

Jarren Duran and Rafael Devers finished 8th and 13th in American League MVP voting, respectively.

== Farm system ==
Minor-league managers and other personnel were announced on February 1.

Level	Team	League	Division	Manager	Record (Note: Overall records for the entire season are presented—some minor leagues play a split season, with first-half and second-half results determining playoff participants.)
Triple-A	Worcester Red Sox	International League	East	Chad Tracy	79–71 (.527)
Double-A	Portland Sea Dogs	Eastern League	Northeast	Chad Epperson	78–60 (.565)
High-A	Greenville Drive	South Atlantic League	South	Iggy Suarez	63–69 (.477)
Single-A	Salem Red Sox	Carolina League	North	Liam Carroll	70–62 (.530)
Rookie	FCL Red Sox	Florida Complex League	South	Jimmy Gonzalez; Tom Kotchman	35–24 (.593)
Rookie	DSL Red Sox Blue	Dominican; Summer League	North	Sandy Madera	27–26 (.509)
Rookie	DSL Red Sox Red	Dominican; Summer League	West	Amaury Garcia	42–14 (.750)

== Amateur draft ==
Red Sox draft picks
Round	Pick	Name	Position	School (state)	Birthplace	Signing date	References
1	12	Braden Montgomery	RF	Texas A&M (TX)	USA	July 29	
2	50	Payton Tolle	P	Texas Christian University (TX)	USA	July 29	
3	86	Brandon Neely	P	University of Florida (FL)	USA	July 27	
4	115	Zach Ehrhard	OF	Oklahoma State (OK)	USA	July 27	
5	148	Brandon Clarke	P	State College of Florida, Manatee─Sarasota (FL)	USA	July 27	
6	177	Blake Aita	P	Kennesaw State (GA)	USA	July 27	
7	207	Will Turner	OF	University of South Alabama (AL)	USA	July 27	
8	237	Conrad Cason	TWP	Greater Atlanta Christian High School (GA)	USA	July 29	
9	268	Hudson White	C	University of Arkansas (AR)	USA	July 27	
10	297	Devin Futrell	P	Vanderbilt University (TN)	USA	July 30	
11	327	Steven Brooks	P	California Polytechnic State University (CA)	USA	July 30	
12	357	Brady Tygart	P	University of Arkansas (AR)	USA	July 30	
13	387	Shea Sprague	P	University of North Carolina (NC)	USA	July 30	
14	417	Alex Bouchard	P	Lehigh University (PA)	USA	July 27	
15	447	Joey Gartrell	P	University of Oregon (OR)	USA	July 27	
16	477	Griffin Kilander	P	Wayne State University (MI)	USA	July 27	
17	507	Yan Cruz	OF	Academia Presbiteriana High School (PR)	PR	July 27	
18	537	Cole Tolbert	P	University of Mississippi (MS)	USA	July 27	
19	567	D'Angelo Ortiz	3B	Miami Dade College Kendall (FL)	USA	July 27	
20	597	Ben Hansen	P	Brigham Young University (UT)	USA	July 27	
