= Bryan Mata =

Venezuelan baseball player (born 1999)

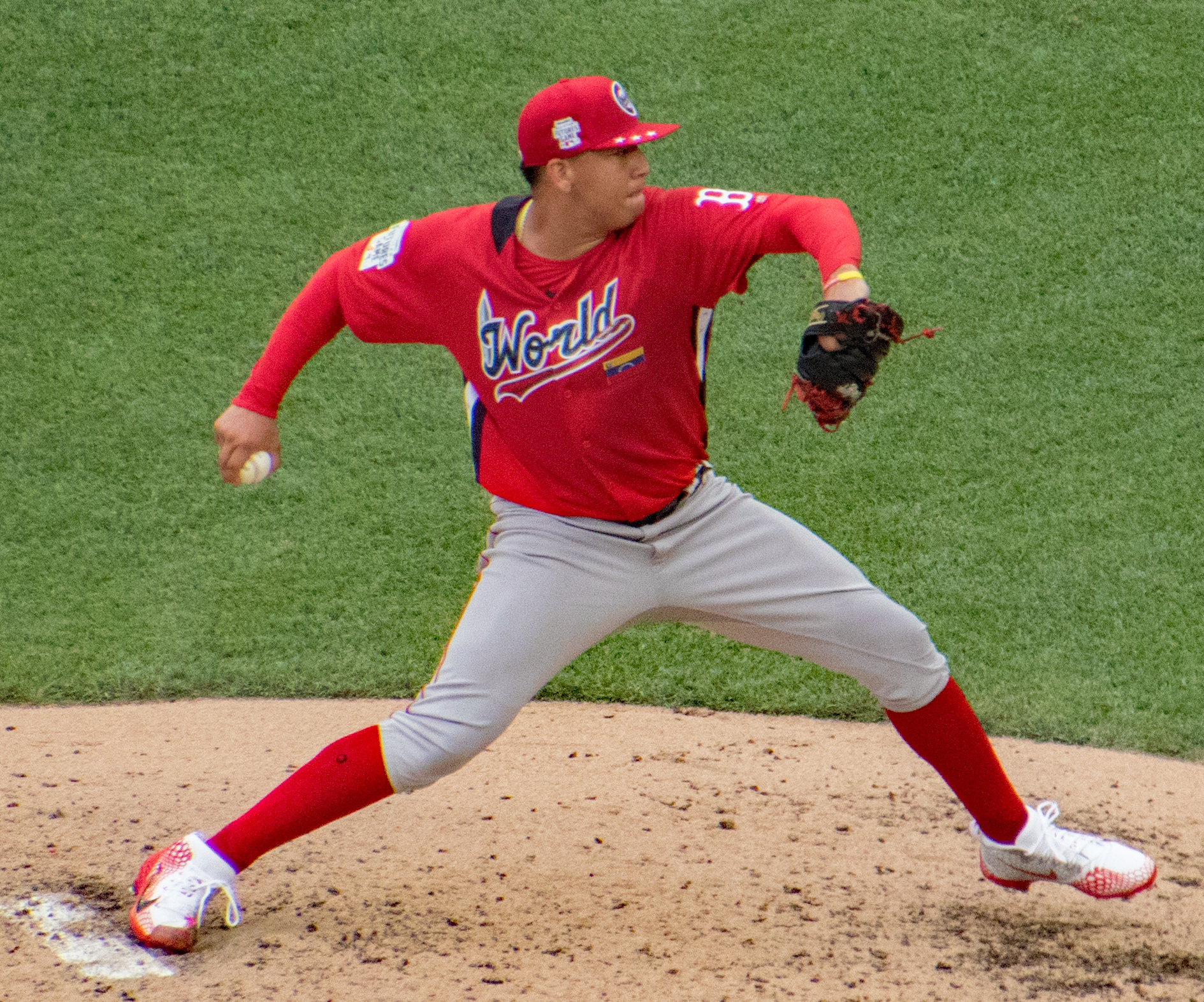
- Mata pitching in the All-Star Futures Game in 2018

Yomiuri Giants – No. 42
- Pitcher
- Born: May 3, 1999 (age 27); Maracay, Venezuela
- Bats: Right Throws: Right

NPB debut
- April 11, 2026, for the Yomiuri Giants

NPB statistics (through August 18, 2026)
- Win–loss record: 0–1
- Earned run average: 2.79
- Strikeouts: 20

Teams
- Yomiuri Giants (2026–present)

Bryan Eduardo Mata (born May 3, 1999) is a Venezuelan professional baseball pitcher for the Yomiuri Giants of Nippon Professional Baseball (NPB). Listed at 6 feet 3 inches (1.91 m) and 160 pounds (73 kg), he bats and throws right-handed.

== Career ==
=== Boston Red Sox ===
Mata signed with the Boston Red Sox as an international free agent in January 2016 for a $25,000 signing bonus. He made his professional debut that summer for the Dominican Summer League Red Sox and spent all the whole season there, compiling a 4–4 record, a 2.80 ERA, and a 1.20 WHIP in 14 games started. In 2017, he played for the Single–A Greenville Drive where he posted a 5–6 record with a 3.74 ERA in 17 starts.

MLB.com ranked Mata as Boston's fourth best prospect going into the 2018 season. Playing for the High–A Salem Red Sox, Mata was the sole Boston prospect selected to the 2018 All-Star Futures Game, where he pitched an inning of scoreless relief, allowing one hit while walking one and striking out one. In 17 starts for Salem, Mata was 6–3 with a 3.50 ERA and a 1.61 WHIP.

Mata started the 2019 season with Salem, and was promoted to the Double-A Portland Sea Dogs on July 1. Overall with both teams during the season, Mata compiled a 7–7 record with 3.43 ERA and 111 strikeouts in 105 innings. After the 2020 minor league season was cancelled due to the COVID-19 pandemic, Mata was invited to participate in the Red Sox' fall instructional league. Following the 2020 season, Mata was ranked by Baseball America as the Red Sox' number four prospect.

On November 20, 2020, Mata was added to Boston's 40-man roster in order to be protected from the Rule 5 draft. During 2021 spring training, he sustained a slight tear in the ulnar collateral ligament of the elbow. On April 13, 2021, Mata underwent Tommy John surgery, ending his 2021 season. Mata began the 2022 season on the injured list in Triple-A with the Worcester Red Sox. He resumed pitching in May in extended spring training, and played in a minor-league game for the first time in over two years in early June. With four different teams during 2022, Mata pitched in 19 games (18 starts) while compiling a 2.49 ERA in 83 innings with a 7–3 record.

Mata spent 2023 in Triple-A with Worcester, compiling an 0–3 record in nine games (seven starts) with a 6.33 ERA in 27 innings pitched in which he gave up 30 walks and had 28 strikeouts. Following the 2023 regular season, he played in the Arizona Fall League, where he gave up eight earned runs in nine innings. Mata spent much of the first half of the 2024 season on the injured list due to hamstring and shoulder issues. He was transferred to the team's 60-day injured list on July 26. Mata was designated for assignment by the Red Sox on November 19. On November 22, the Red Sox non–tendered Mata, making him a free agent. He re–signed with the organization on a minor-league contract the same day.

Mata began the 2025 season with Worcester. In mid-June, upon the Red Sox trading Rafael Devers, Mata became the longest-tenured player in the Red Sox organization. He made 42 total appearances for Worcester, compiling a 3–3 record and 5.08 ERA with 93 strikeouts and two saves across 67 1/3 innings pitched. Mata elected free agency following the season on November 6, 2025.

=== Yomiuri Giants ===
On December 9, 2025, Mata signed with the Yomiuri Giants of Nippon Professional Baseball.
