= Andrew Politi =

American baseball player (born 1996)

Free agent
- Pitcher
- Born: June 4, 1996 (age 28); Long Valley, New Jersey, U.S.
- Bats: Right Throws: Right

Andrew Politi (born June 4, 1996) is an American professional baseball pitcher who is a free agent.

== Career ==
Raised in the Long Valley section of Washington Township, Morris County, New Jersey, Politi played prep baseball at West Morris Central High School and attended Seton Hall University, where he played college baseball for the Seton Hall Pirates. The Boston Red Sox selected him in the 15th round, with the 460th overall selection, of the 2018 Major League Baseball draft.

Politi spent his first minor-league season with the Lowell Spinners in 2018, appearing in 21 games (all in relief) while posting a 4.34 earned run average (ERA). In 2019, he played for the High-A Salem Red Sox, compiling a 3.55 ERA in 33 games (five starts). Politi did not play in a game in 2020 due to the cancellation of the minor league season because of the COVID-19 pandemic. Politi played in Double-A with the Portland Sea Dogs in 2021, recording a 6.36 ERA in 21 games (15 starts). Politi split the 2022 season between Portland and the Triple-A Worcester Red Sox, posting an overall 4–1 record with eight savess and a 2.60 ERA in 50 appearances (two starts). After the regular season, he played in the Arizona Fall League.

On December 7, 2022, the Baltimore Orioles selected Politi from the Red Sox in the 2022 Rule 5 draft. Politi posted a 6.23 ERA across nine spring training appearances before he was designated for assignment by the Orioles on March 27, 2023. The next day, Politi cleared waivers and was returned to the Red Sox. He spent the 2023 season with Worcester, pitching to a 4.45 ERA with 15 saves while striking out 60 batters in 58 2/3 innings.

In 2024, Politi made 11 appearances for Worcester, struggling to a 12.19 ERA with 12 strikeouts across 10 1/3 innings pitched. On June 18, 2024, Politi was released by the Red Sox organization.

== See also ==
- Rule 5 draft results
