= Luis Perales =

Venezuelan baseball player (born 2003)

Washington Nationals – No. 43
- Pitcher
- Born: April 14, 2003 (age 23); Guacara, Venezuela
- Bats: Right Throws: Right

MLB debut
- August 26, 2026, for the Washington Nationals

MLB statistics (through 2026 season)
- Win–loss record: 0–0
- Earned run average: 11.45
- Strikeouts: 13
- Stats at Baseball Reference

Teams
- Washington Nationals (2026–present)

Luis Alexis Perales (born April 14, 2003) is a Venezuelan professional baseball pitcher for the Washington Nationals of Major League Baseball (MLB). He made his MLB debut in 2026.

== Career ==
=== Boston Red Sox ===
Perales signed with the Boston Red Sox as an international free agent on July 2, 2019. He did not play in a game in 2020 due to the cancellation of the minor league season because of the COVID-19 pandemic.

Perales made his professional debut for the Dominican Summer League Red Sox in 2021, and split 2022 between the rookie–level Florida Complex League Red Sox and Single–A Salem Red Sox. He split the 2023 campaign between Salem and the High-A Greenville Drive. Perales posted a cumulative 1.77 earned run average (ERA) in 35 2/3 innings pitched in 2022 and a 3.91 ERA in 89 2/3 innings in 2023, primarily as a stating pitcher.

On November 14, 2023, the Red Sox added Perales to their 40-man roster to protect him from the Rule 5 draft. He began the 2024 season with Greenville, ranked as the Red Sox' number nine minor-league prospect by Baseball America. In 9 starts split between Greenville and the Double–A Portland Sea Dogs, Perales compiled a 2–2 record and 2.94 ERA with 56 strikeouts across 33 2/3 innings pitched. On June 18, 2024, it was announced that Perales would require Tommy John surgery, ending his season.

Perales was optioned to Double-A Portland to begin the 2025 season as he continued to recover from surgery.

=== Washington Nationals ===
The Nationals acquired Perales in a prospect-for-prospect swap with the Red Sox on December 15, 2025, with left-hander Jake Bennett going back the other way. Perales was optioned to the Triple-A Rochester Red Wings to begin the 2026 season.

Perales moved into a relief role after beginning the 2026 season in the Rochester rotation. The Nationals recalled him August 26, 2026, for his major league debut. Facing the Colorado Rockies at Nationals Park, Perales pitched two innings, giving up four runs on a grand slam in the seventh inning.
