= Joe Dunand =

American baseball player (born 1995)

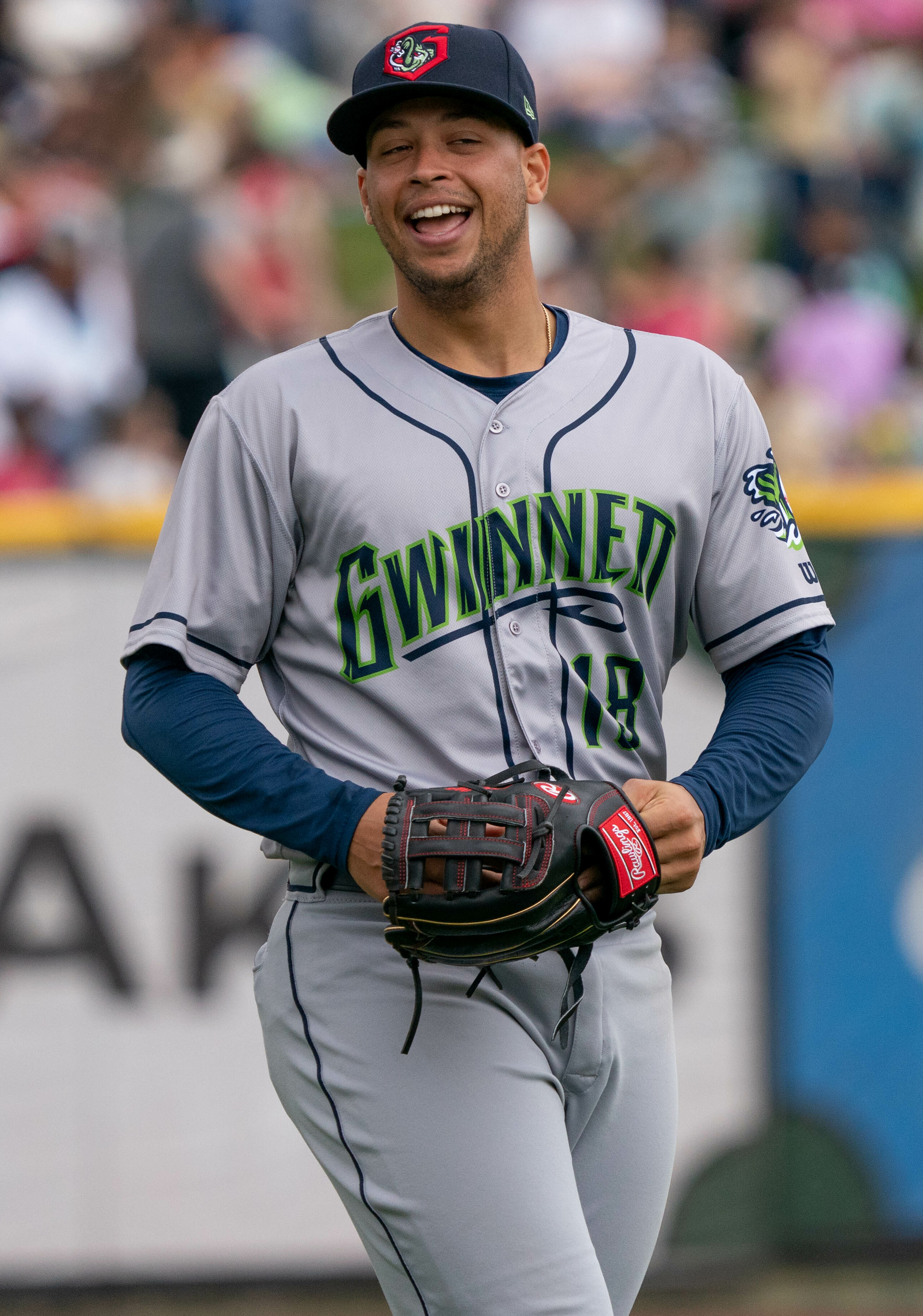
- Dunand with the Gwinnett Stripers in 2023
- Infielder
- Born: September 20, 1995 (age 30); Miami, Florida, U.S.
- Batted: Right Threw: Right

MLB debut
- May 7, 2022, for the Miami Marlins

Last MLB appearance
- May 24, 2022, for the Miami Marlins

Career statistics
- Batting average: .300
- Home runs: 1
- Runs batted in: 1
- Stats at Baseball Reference

Teams
- Miami Marlins (2022)

Joseph Alexander Dunand Jr. (born September 20, 1995) is an American former professional baseball infielder. He played in Major League Baseball (MLB) for the Miami Marlins during the 2022 season.

== Amateur career ==
Dunand attended Gulliver Preparatory School in Miami, Florida. After his senior year, he was drafted by the Cleveland Indians in the 35th round of the 2014 MLB draft. He did not sign, instead enrolling at North Carolina State University. He played college baseball as a shortstop for the NC State Wolfpack. In 2016, he played collegiate summer baseball with the Harwich Mariners of the Cape Cod Baseball League, where he was named a league all-star. In 2017, his junior year, he hit .289 with 16 home runs.

== Professional career ==
=== Miami Marlins ===
The Miami Marlins selected Dunand with the 51st overall selection of the 2017 Major League Baseball draft. Dunand signed with the Marlins, receiving a $1.2 million signing bonus. He made his professional debut that year and spent his first professional season with both the Jupiter Hammerheads and the GCL Marlins, slashing .370/.471/.667 with one home run and five doubles in eight games between the two teams.

Dunand began 2018 with Jupiter. After batting .263 with seven home runs and 42 RBIs in 66 games, he was promoted to the Jacksonville Jumbo Shrimp. He finished the year with Jacksonville, hitting .212 with seven home runs and 28 RBIs in 61 games. He returned to Jacksonville for the 2019 season, slashing .242/.314/.333 with five home runs and 42 RBIs over 130 games. He did not play a minor league game in 2020 due to the cancellation of the minor league season caused by the COVID-19 pandemic. In 2021, Dunand returned to play with Jacksonville with whom he batted .201 with eight home runs and 32 RBIs over 64 games.

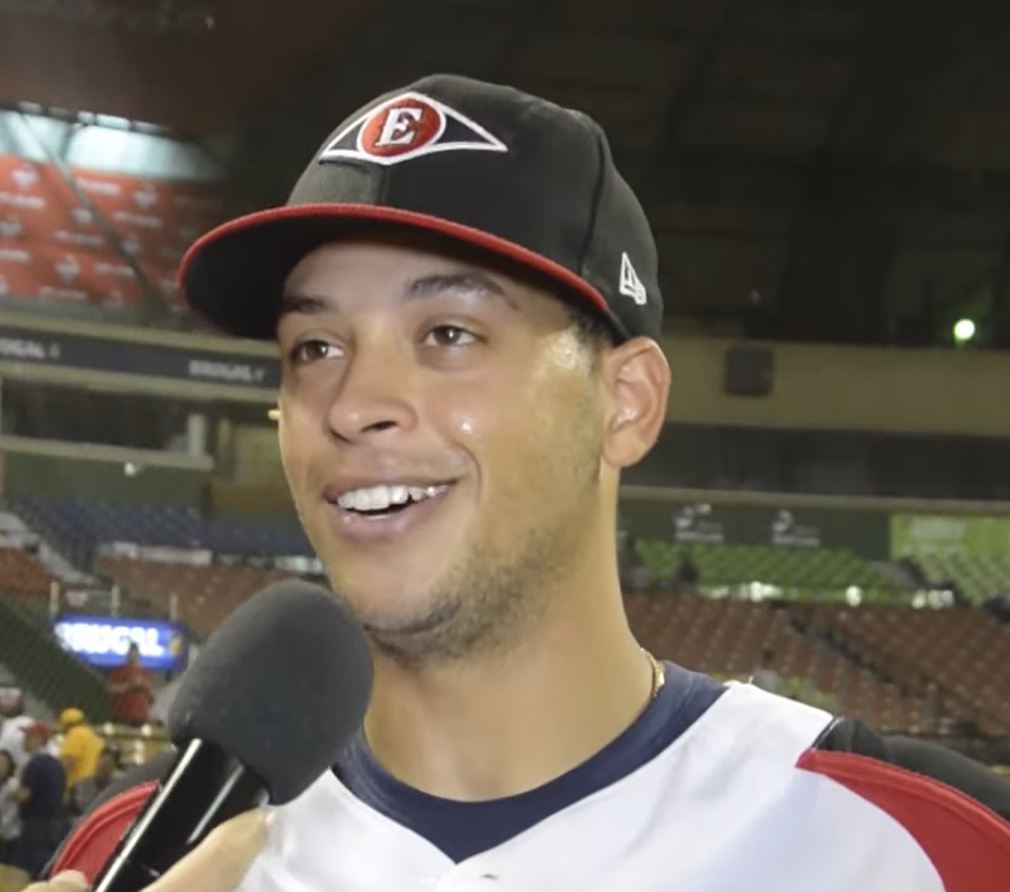
Dunand with Leones del Escogido in 2019

On May 7, 2022, Dunand was selected to the major league roster as a COVID replacement. He made his major league debut that night and hit a home run in his first at bat. The Marlins designated him for assignment on May 29.

=== Atlanta Braves ===
The Atlanta Braves claimed Dunand off of waivers on June 1. On June 10, the Braves designated Dunand for assignment. On June 12, Dunand cleared waivers and was sent outright to the Triple-A Gwinnett Stripers. In 70 games for the Stripers, he batted .205/.300/.319 with 4 home runs and 15 RBI.

Dunand returned to Gwinnett in 2023, playing in 95 games and hitting .268/.362/.481 with 17 home runs, 52 RBI, and 3 stolen bases. He elected free agency following the season on November 6, 2023.

=== Staten Island FerryHawks ===
On January 31, 2024, Dunand signed a minor league contract with the Boston Red Sox. He was released by the Red Sox organization on March 24.

On April 22, 2024, Dunand signed with the Staten Island FerryHawks of the Atlantic League of Professional Baseball. In 62 games for Staten Island, he batted .252/.328/.382 with seven home runs and 28 RBI. Dunand was released by the FerryHawks on July 15.

On May 30, 2025, Dunand announced his retirement per his Instagram account.

== See also ==
- List of Major League Baseball players with a home run in their first major league at bat

== Personal life ==
Dunand's uncle is Alex Rodriguez.
