= 2023 Boston Red Sox season =

Professional sports season in Major League Baseball

2023 Boston Red Sox
- League: American League
- Division: East
- Ballpark: Fenway Park
- City: Boston, Massachusetts
- Record: 78–84 (.481)
- Divisional place: 5th
- Owners: John W. Henry (Fenway Sports Group)
- President: Sam Kennedy
- Chief baseball officer: Chaim Bloom (until Sept. 14)
- General manager: Brian O'Halloran (until Sept. 14)
- Manager: Alex Cora
- Television: NESN: Dave O’Brien or Mike Monaco (play-by-play) with Lou Merloni, Will Middlebrooks, Kevin Millar, Tim Wakefield, (Note: Wakefield died on October 1, the final day of the team's season.) Kevin Youkilis (analyst rotation)
- Radio: WEEI-FM / Boston Red Sox Radio Network: Joe Castiglione, Will Flemming, Sean McDonough, Lou Merloni (rotation)

The 2023 Boston Red Sox season was the 123rd season in Boston Red Sox franchise history, and their 112th season at Fenway Park. The team was led by Alex Cora, in the third season of his second stint as the team's manager.

The Red Sox began their regular season on March 30, in a home game against the Baltimore Orioles. On September 14, Chief Baseball Officer Chaim Bloom, who joined the team following the 2019 season, was fired, and Brian O'Halloran was removed as general manager, although not fired. On September 20, the team was eliminated from playoff contention for the second straight season. The team's season ended on October 1, finishing with a record of 78–84, in last place of the American League East. Average attendance was 32,989 for their 81 home games during the season, 12th-highest in the league.

The Red Sox ranked last in fielding among Major League Baseball (MLB) teams, and were criticized for poor pitching, a lack of pitching depth, and poor roster management.

== Offseason ==
The team entered the offseason with the status of several players, most notably Xander Bogaerts, unclear due to expiring contracts or opt-out clauses.

=== Rule changes ===
MLB adopted several rule changes during the offseason. Briefly:

- A pitch clock will now be used.
- Pitchers are now limited to two "disengagements" (such as making a pickoff throw) during each batter's plate appearance.
- Use of the infield shift is now restricted.
- All three bases are increased from 15 inches (38 cm) square to 18 inches (46 cm) square.

Additionally announced in February:

- As was first done during the shortened 2020 season, all extra innings during the regular season will start with a runner on second base.
- When a position player can pitch has been slightly adjusted, based on the size of a team's lead and the inning.

October–December 2022

=== October ===
- On October 11, the team claimed catcher Caleb Hamilton off waivers from the Minnesota Twins; in a corresponding move, outfielder Abraham Almonte was designated for assignment. Almonte subsequently elected to become a free agent.
- On October 13, the team claimed pitcher Jake Reed off waivers from the Baltimore Orioles; in a corresponding move, pitcher Eduard Bazardo was designated for assignment. Bazardo later elected to become a free agent.
- On October 31, pitcher Tyler Danish elected minor-league free agency, after being placed on waivers and removed from the 40-man roster by the team.

=== November ===
- On November 6, the following players elected free agency: Nathan Eovaldi, Rich Hill, J. D. Martinez, Matt Strahm, and Michael Wacha.
- On November 7, Xander Bogaerts elected free agency.
- On November 8, the team announced that pitcher James Paxton exercised his $4 million option to remain a member of the Red Sox for the 2023 season.
- On November 9, the team traded pitcher Easton McGee to the Seattle Mariners for cash.
- On November 10, the Red Sox announced that both the team and outfielder Tommy Pham declined a mutual option, making him a free agent.
- On November 10, the team selected the contract of infielder Enmanuel Valdez from the Worcester Red Sox.
- On November 15, the team designated two players for assignment—Caleb Hamilton and Jake Reed—and added five players to the 40-man roster: Wilyer Abreu, David Hamilton, Ceddanne Rafaela, Chris Murphy, and Brandon Walter. Reed was later claimed off waivers by the Los Angeles Dodgers.
- On November 16, bench coach Will Venable left the team to join the Texas Rangers as associate manager.
- On November 18, the team non-tendered Yu Chang and Franchy Cordero, making both players free agents.
- On November 23, the team signed free-agent left-handed pitcher Joely Rodríguez to a one-year contract with a club option for 2024.
- On November 23, the team acquired infielder Hoy Park from the Pittsburgh Pirates in exchange for minor-league left-handed pitcher Inmer Lobo.
- On November 29, the team promoted Ramón Vázquez to bench coach.
- On November 30, the team announced a 10-year agreement with MassMutual; the agreement includes the team wearing MassMutual uniform patches, and MassMutual signage at Fenway Park.

=== December ===
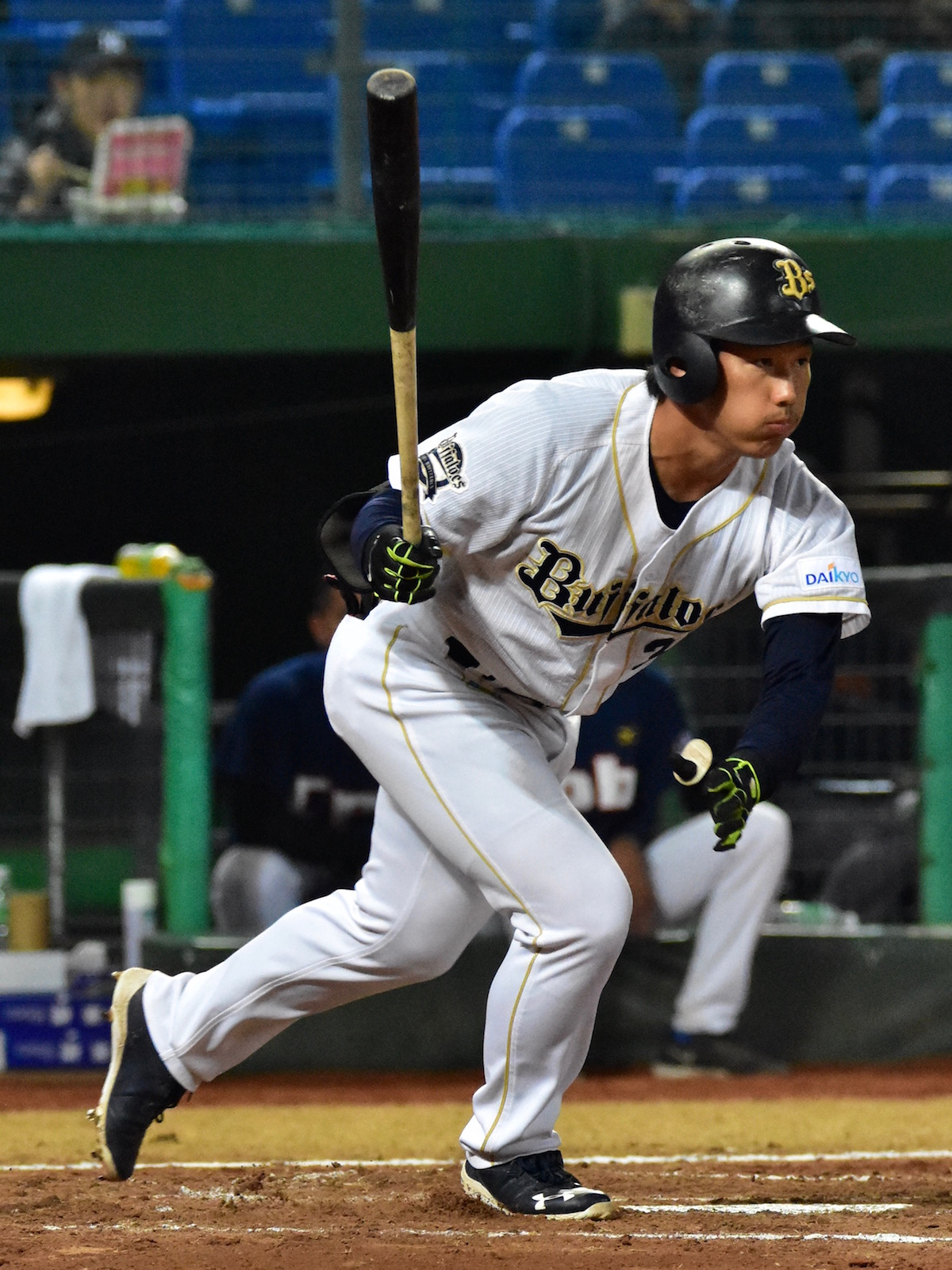
Masataka Yoshida in 2016

- On December 2, the team sent catcher Ronaldo Hernández outright to Worcester, removing him from the 40-man roster.
- On December 7, minor-league pitcher Thad Ward—a fifth-round selection by Boston during the 2018 MLB draft—was selected by the Washington Nationals with the first pick of the 2022 Rule 5 draft. Also selected from Boston's minor-league system were pitchers Andrew Politi by the Baltimore Orioles and Noah Song by the Philadelphia Phillies.
- On December 8, the team signed free-agent pitcher Chris Martin to a two-year contract.
- On December 9, free-agent Xander Bogaerts, who had played 10 seasons with Boston, signed with the San Diego Padres.
- On December 13, the team signed free-agent reliever Kenley Jansen to a two-year contract; in a corresponding move, Hoy Park was designated for assignment. Park was subsequently traded to the Atlanta Braves for a player to be named later or cash considerations.
- On December 15, the team signed outfielder Masataka Yoshida, previously with the Orix Buffaloes of Nippon Professional Baseball (NPB), to a five-year contract; in a corresponding move, infielder Jeter Downs was designated for assignment. Downs was later claimed by the Washington Nationals.
- On December 16, the team acquired relief pitcher Wyatt Mills from the Kansas City Royals in exchange for minor-league pitcher Jacob Wallace. In a corresponding move, the Red Sox designated Eric Hosmer for assignment. Hosmer was released on December 22.
- On December 27, free-agent Nathan Eovaldi, who had spent the prior five seasons with Boston, signed with the Texas Rangers.

January–March 2023

=== January ===
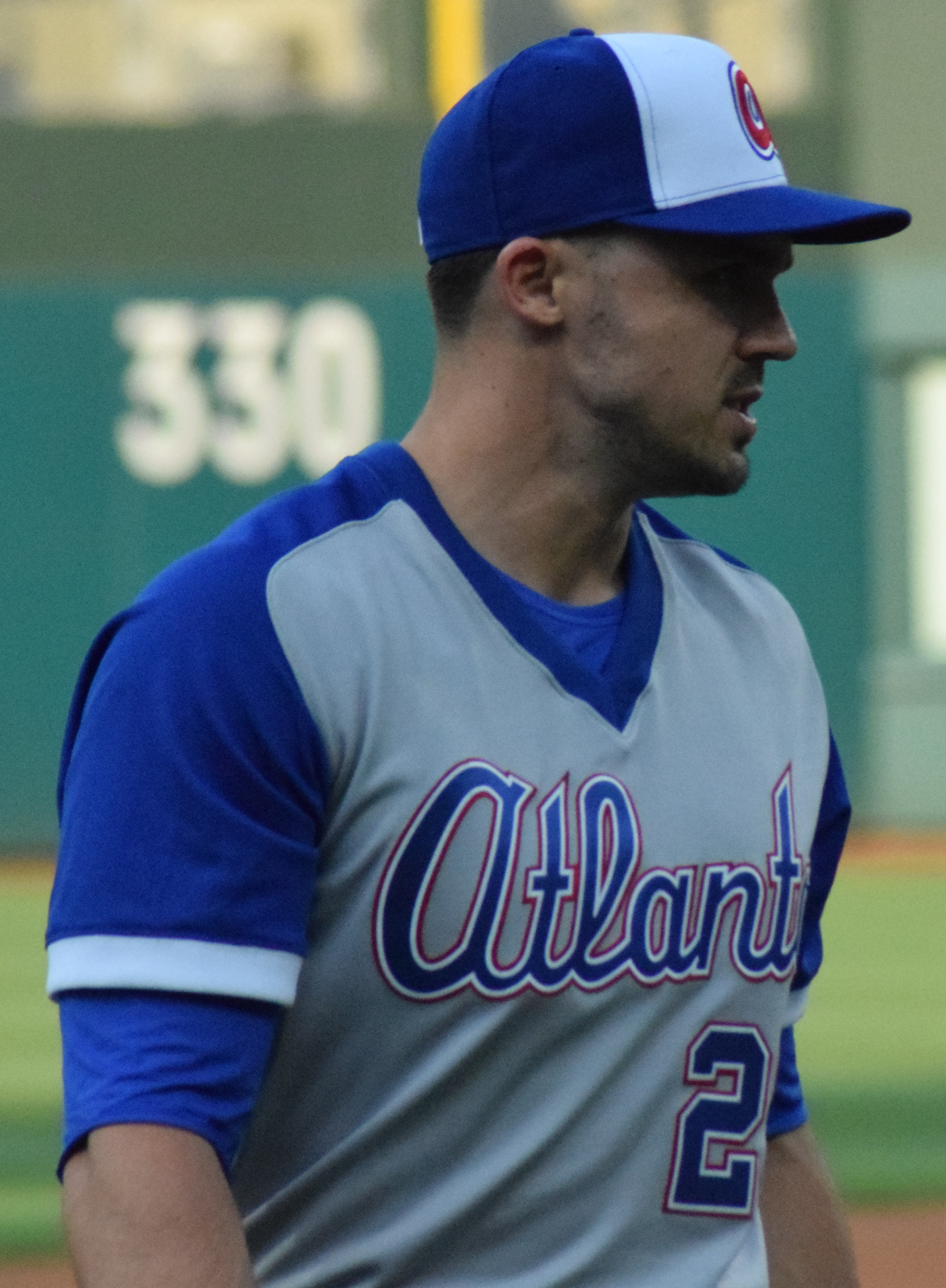
Adam Duvall in 2018

- On January 3, the team and Rafael Devers agreed to terms on a one-year contract, avoiding salary arbitration.
- On January 4, the team named former MLB outfielder Kyle Hudson as first base coach and outfield instructor.
- On January 6, the team signed Justin Turner to a one-year contract; in a corresponding move, pitcher Darwinzon Hernández was designated for assignment.
- On January 10, the team announced that Trevor Story underwent surgery on his right ulnar collateral ligament (elbow), and that he would miss at least part of the 2023 season.
- On January 11, Darwinzon Hernández was traded to the Baltimore Orioles in exchange for cash considerations.
- On January 11, the team announced a 10-year contract extension, worth $331 million, with Rafael Devers.
- On January 12, the team signed pitcher Corey Kluber to a one-year contract for the 2023 season, with an option for 2024; in a corresponding move, pitcher Connor Seabold was designated for assignment. Seabold was subsequently traded to the Colorado Rockies.
- On January 13, the team reached agreement on one-year contracts with five players, avoiding salary arbitration: Christian Arroyo, Ryan Brasier, Reese McGuire, Nick Pivetta, and Alex Verdugo.
- On January 24, the team traded pitcher Josh Taylor to the Kansas City Royals in exchange for shortstop Adalberto Mondesí and a player to be named later.
- On January 24, the team signed outfielder Adam Duvall to a one-year contract; in a corresponding move, pitcher Matt Barnes was designated for assignment.
- On January 30, Barnes was traded to the Miami Marlins in exchange for relief pitcher Richard Bleier; in a corresponding move, relief pitcher Frank German was designated for assignment. German was later traded to the Chicago White Sox for minor-league pitcher Theo Denlinger.

=== February ===
- On February 16, the team signed infielder Yu Chang to a one-year contract; in a corresponding roster move, Trevor Story was placed on the 60-day injured list.

=== March ===
- On Opening Day, March 30, Adalberto Mondesí was placed on the 60-day injured list due to a left ACL tear; his spot on the 40-man roster was used to active Raimel Tapia.

=== Spring training ===
"Truck day", when the tractor-trailer carrying the team's equipment departs Fenway Park for Florida, was February 3. The Red Sox had their first spring training game on February 24, a 5–3 exhibition win over the Northeastern Huskies at JetBlue Park. The Red Sox defeated Team Puerto Rico, 9–3, in an exhibition game on March 8. The Red Sox' preseason concluded on March 28. Boston's Grapefruit League schedule featured 18 home games and 16 away games. The team posted a 14–14 record while scoring 164 runs and allowing 161.

== Regular season ==
For the first time, MLB scheduled each team in the league to play every other team in the league during the regular season, resulting in Boston facing National League (NL) teams 46 times, compared to 20 times under prior scheduling. The team's schedule was constructed by MLB as follows:

- 13 games × 4 AL East teams (Yankees, Blue Jays, Orioles, Rays) = 52 games
- 7 games × 4 AL teams (Astros, Royals, Angels, Twins) = 28 games
- 6 games × 6 AL teams (White Sox, Guardians, Tigers, Athletics, Mariners, Rangers) = 36 games
- 4 games × 1 NL team (Braves) = 4 games
- 3 games × 14 NL teams (all other NL teams) = 42 games

Total: 162 games

=== Opening Day lineup ===
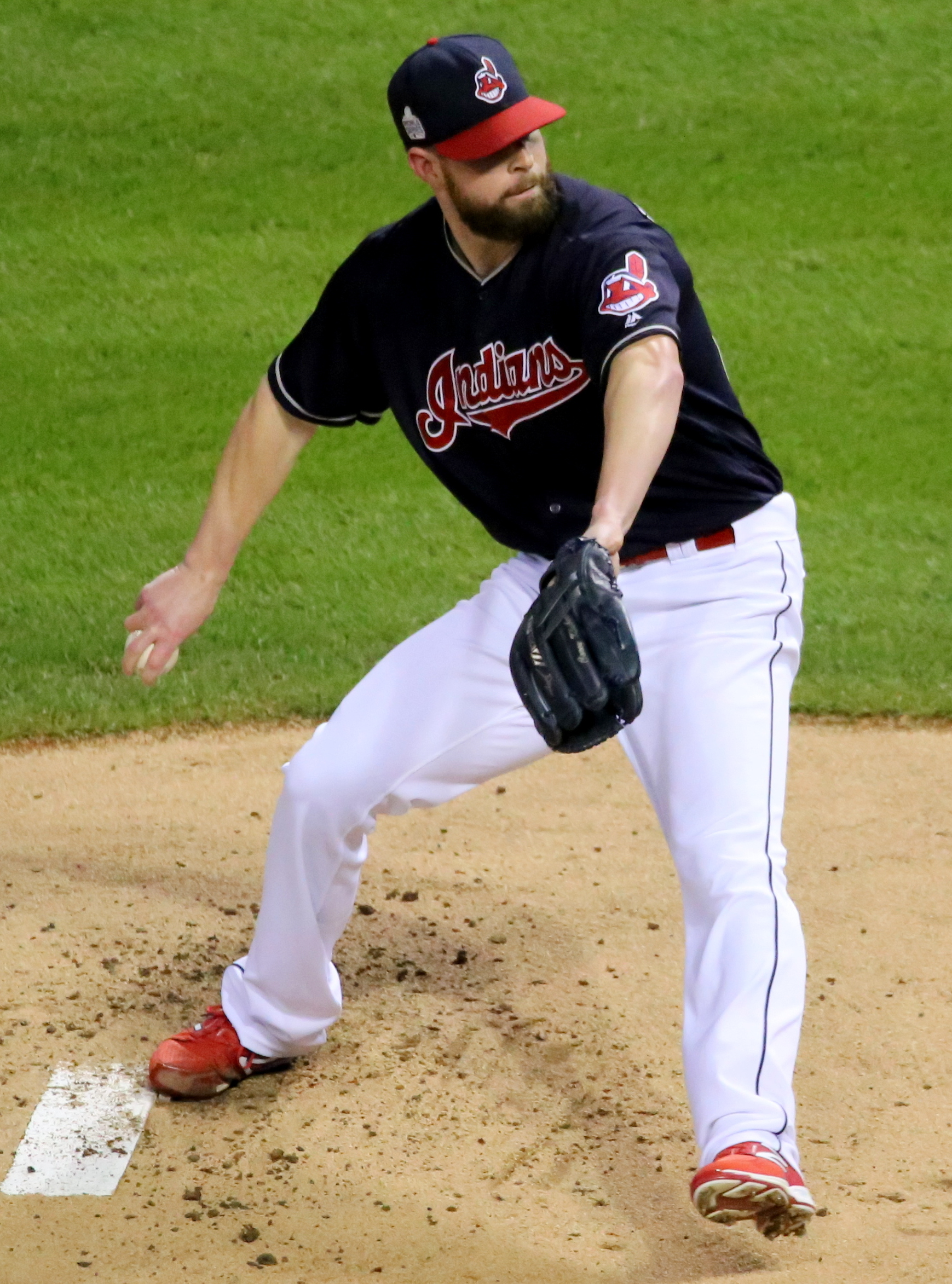
Opening Day starter Corey Kluber

Order	No.	Player	Pos.
1	99	Alex Verdugo	RF
2	11	Rafael Devers	3B
3	2	Justin Turner	DH
4	7	Masataka Yoshida	LF
5	18	Adam Duvall	CF
6	36	Triston Casas	1B
7	39	Christian Arroyo	2B
8	3	Reese McGuire	C
9	5	Kiké Hernández	SS
—	28	Corey Kluber	P

March / April

=== March / April ===
March 30–April 2, vs. Baltimore Orioles

The Red Sox opened the season with a loss at Fenway to the Orioles. After trailing, 10–4, entering the eighth inning, the Red Sox scored five unanswered runs in the final two innings and had the tying run at second base when the game ended. Starter Corey Kluber took the loss after allowing five runs on six hits in 3 1/3 innings. The Red Sox rallied from an early 7–1 deficit to win the second game of the series, 9–8. Trailing by a run entering the ninth inning, Orioles left fielder Ryan McKenna dropped a two-out fly ball, allowing the next batter, Adam Duvall, to hit a two-run walk-off home run. Boston starter Chris Sale allowed seven runs on seven hits in three innings, but escaped with a no decision. Reliever Kenley Jansen received the win. In the final game of the series, Boston again scored nine runs, defeating the Orioles by a 9–5 score. The Red Sox became the third MLB team since 1901 to score at least nine runs in each of their first three games, joining the 1976 Cincinnati Reds and 1978 Milwaukee Brewers. Five Boston batters had multiple hits, led by Duvall with three hits and two RBIs. Starter Tanner Houck earned the win after allowing three runs on five hits in five innings.

Red Sox won the series 2–1 (27–23 runs)

April 3–April 5, vs. Pittsburgh Pirates

Boston lost the opener of a three-game series against the Pirates, 7–6. The Red Sox had a 5–3 lead after the first inning, but trailed 7–5 after four innings. Alex Verdugo had three hits. Starter Kutter Crawford took the loss after allowing seven runs on eight hits in four innings. In the middle game of the series, the Red Sox scored once in the bottom of the first inning, then were shutout for the remainder of the game, a 4–1 win for Pittsburgh. Reese McGuire had two of Boston's four hits. Starter Nick Pivetta allowed three runs (one earned) on three hits in five innings and took the loss. The final game of the series was another 4–1 win for the Pirates, completing their series sweep. Christian Arroyo had two hits and drove in Boston's only run. Starter Corey Kluber allowed one run on three hits in five innings and took the loss.

Red Sox lost the series 0–3 (8–15 runs)

April 6–April 9, at Detroit Tigers

The opener of a three-game series in Detroit was won by Boston, 6–3. Starter Chris Sale earned the win after allowing three runs on four hits in five innings, while Kenley Jansen earned his first save as a member of the Red Sox. Adam Duvall and Rafael Devers both homered. The Red Sox won the second game of the series, 14–5. Devers hit two home runs, including the team's first grand slam of the season. Duvall and Raimel Tapia also homered. Starter Tanner Houck earned the win after allowing two runs on three hits in five innings. Boston completed the series sweep with a 4–1 win on Sunday. Starter Kutter Crawford allowed one run on five hits in five innings and earned the win, while Jansen notched his second save of the season. Triston Casas homered and had two RBIs. Duvall left the game in the ninth inning after apparently injuring his left wrist while attempting to make a catch in the outfield. The team later announced that he broke his wrist, and he was placed on the injured list.

Red Sox won the series 3–0 (24–9 runs)

April 10–April 13, at Tampa Bay Rays

The opener of a four-game series in Tampa Bay was won by the Rays, 1–0, on an eighth-inning home run by Brandon Lowe. The win brought Tampa Bay's record to 10–0 for the season. The Red Sox were limited to three hits, although they did load the bases with two outs in the eighth inning, only to have Rafael Devers strike out. Starter Nick Pivetta held the Rays scoreless through five innings, having allowed three hits while striking out six batters. Reliever Chris Martin took the loss. The Rays also won the second game of the series, 7–2. Reese McGuire had two of Boston's six hits, plus an RBI. Starter Garrett Whitlock allowed five runs on eight hits in five innings and took the loss. The third game of the series was another Tampa Bay win, 9–7. Starter Chris Sale allowed six runs (five earned) on seven hits in four innings and took the loss. McGuire had three hits and Devers hit a three-run homer. The Rays completed the sweep on Thursday with a 9–3 win, giving them a 13–0 record. The Red Sox fell to 5–8. Started Corey Kluber fell to 0–3 after allowing four runs on four hits in 4 2/3 innings and taking the loss. Justin Turner had two of Boston's four hits.

Red Sox lost the series 0–4 (12–26 runs)

April 14–April 17, vs. Los Angeles Angels

The Red Sox ended their losing streak at four games with a 5–3 win over the Angels, who committed three errors. Starter Tanner Houck had a no decision after allowing two runs on four hits in four innings. Josh Winckowski, who pitched three innings in relief, earned the win while Kenley Jansen recorded his third save of the season. Rafael Devers hit his sixth home run of the season. Boston won the second game of the series, played on Jackie Robinson Day, 9–7. Starter Nick Pivetta allowed six runs (including a first-inning grand slam) on five hits in four innings, but had a no decision. Ryan Brasier, the fourth of five Red Sox relievers, got the win, and Jansen closed out the game for another save. Devers again homered, while Yu Chang had two hits (one a home run) and four RBIs. The third game of the series was also won by Boston, 2–1, with both runs coming on a Justin Turner home run in the bottom of the third inning. Starter Garrett Whitlock went seven innings, earning the win after allowing one run on three hits. Brasier pitched the ninth inning and earned the save. The Angels avoided a sweep with a 5–4 win in the final game of the series, played on Marathon Monday. The Angels scored four runs in the top of the first inning off of starter Brayan Bello, who took the loss after allowing five runs on eight hits in 2 2/3 innings. Devers was the only Boston batter to record two hits.

Red Sox won the series 3–1 (20–16 runs)

April 18–April 20, vs. Minnesota Twins

The Red Sox won the opener of a three-game series against the Twins, 5–4, in 10 innings. Tied 2–2 after nine innings, Minnesota scored twice off of John Schreiber in the top of the 10th, but Boston responded with three runs off of Jovani Morán in the bottom of the frame. Starter Chris Sale allowed one run on three hits in six innings. Alex Verdugo had three hits and drove in the winning run. In the second game of the series, Minnesota scored three runs in the top of the first inning en route to a 10–4 win. Starter Corey Kluber allowed seven runs on six hits in five innings and took the loss. Enmanuel Valdez made his MLB debut and went 2-for-4 at the plate. Boston won the final game of the series, 11–5, after taking a 7–0 lead after three innings. Starter Tanner Houck earned his third win of the season, allowing three runs on six hits in seven innings. Verdugo homered and Jarren Duran drove in three runs.

Red Sox won the series 2–1 (20–19 runs)

April 21–April 23, at Milwaukee Brewers

In the opener of a three-game series in Milwaukee, Nick Pivetta earned his first win of the season in a 5–3 game. He allowed three runs on seven hits in 5 2/3 innings. Kenley Jansen recorded his fifth save of the season. Alex Verdugo hit a two-run home run. The second game of the series was a 5–4 win by the Brewers. Starter Garrett Whitlock allowed five runs on eight hits in four innings, taking the loss. Rafael Devers and Yu Chang accounts for all four Red Sox RBIs, as each hit a two-run homer. Boston won the final game of the series, 12–5. Starter Brayan Bello had a no decision after allowing three runs on five hits in 4 2/3 innings. The win went to Kaleb Ort, the second of four Red Sox relievers. Masataka Yoshida hit two home runs in the eighth inning, the second one a grand slam.

Red Sox won the series 2–1 (21–13 runs)

April 24–April 26, at Baltimore Orioles

In the first of three games in Baltimore, Boston took an early 4–0 lead, but suffered a 5–4 loss. Starter Chris Sale allowed five runs on nine hits in five innings and took the loss. Rafael Devers and Triston Casas homered, while Masataka Yoshida had three hits. The Red Sox won the second game of the series, 8–6, after jumping out to an early 7–0 lead. Starter Corey Kluber allowed one run on five hits in six innings and earned his first win of the season. Kenley Jansen closed out the game for his sixth save. Jarren Duran had a grand slam. Boston lost the final game of the series, 6–2, with starter Tanner Houck taking the loss after allowing four runs (three earned) on seven hits in five innings.

Red Sox lost the series 1–2 (14–17 runs)

April 28–April 30, vs. Cleveland Guardians

The Red Sox lost the first game of a three-game home series against the Guardians, 5–2. Starter Nick Pivetta allowed four runs on five hits in five innings and took the loss. Jarren Duran had three hits. Boston won the second game of the series, 8–7 in 10 innings. The Red Sox held a 6–1 lead after six innings, but the Guardians forced extra innings with five unanswered runs in regulation. After Cleveland scored once in the top of the 10th, Christian Arroyo and Alex Verdugo each had RBI singles in the bottom of the frame for the victory. Brennan Bernardino, the last of seven Red Sox pitchers during the game, got the win. The two teams combined for 30 hits. The Red Sox won the final game of the series, 7–1, on Sunday afternoon. Chris Sale went 6 1/3 innings for the win, allowing one run on three hits. Verdugo had two hits, one of them a home run, and three RBIs.

Red Sox won the series 2–1 (17–13 runs)

The Red Sox ended the first month of the season (including one March game) with a 15–14 record, tied for fourth place in the American League East with the Yankees, eight games behind the Rays.

May

=== May ===
Boston entered May with a 15–14 record, tied with the Yankees at the bottom of the American League East, having just won two of three games in a home series against Cleveland.

May 1–May 4, vs. Toronto Blue Jays

The Red Sox opened a four-game home series against the Blue Jays with a 6–5 win. Entering the bottom of the ninth inning tied, 5–5, Alex Verdugo hit a walk-off home run. Starter Corey Kluber had a no decision after pitching 5 1/3 innings while allowing three runs on five hits. Josh Winckowski pitched the final two innings for Boston and received the win. The second game of the series was also a one-run Boston win, 7–6. Connor Wong was 4-for-4 with two home runs. Starter Tanner Houck had a no decision after allowing six runs on six hits in six innings. Reliever Richard Bleier got the win and Winckowski earned a save. The third game of the series, played in rainy weather, saw the two teams combine for six errors as Boston won, 8–3. Starter Nick Pivetta allowed three runs on five hits in six innings and earned the win. Triston Casas went 3-for-5 and had two RBIs. The series' final game was an 11–5 Red Sox win, completing the sweep. Starter Brayan Bello earned the win after allowing four runs (two earned) on six hits in five innings. Four Boston batters had three hits each, including Rafael Devers who had four RBIs.

Red Sox won the series 4–0 (32–19 runs)

May 5–May 7, at Philadelphia Phillies

The Red Sox opened a three-game road series in Philadelphia with a 5–3 win. The game was delayed for approximately 10 minutes during the first inning, after a fan fell into the Red Sox bullpen from a spectator area in the outfield. Starter Chris Sale earned the win, having allowed three runs on seven hits in six innings. Kenley Jansen posted his seventh save of the season. The second game of the series was also won by Boston, 7–4, largely powered by a five-run fourth inning. Starter Corey Kluber went five innings, allowing three runs on seven hits and earned the win, while Jansen notched another save. Rafael Devers had three hits and two RBIs. Boston's winning streak ended at eight games with a 6–1 loss in the final game of the series. Triston Casas homered for the only Red Sox run. Starter Tanner Houck took the loss after allowing three runs on five hits in the 5 2/3 innings.

Red Sox won the series 2–1 (13–13 runs)

May 9–May 10, at Atlanta Braves

In Atlanta for a short two-game series, Boston lost the opener, 9–3. Starter Nick Pivetta took the loss after allowing seven runs on eight hits in four innings. Alex Verdugo had three hits, while Masataka Yoshida was hitless for the first time in 16 games. The Red Sox won the second game of the series, 5–2. Starter Brayan Bello earned the win, allowing two runs on six hits in six innings. Kenley Jansen earned the save, the 400th of his MLB career. Triston Casas homered.

Red Sox split the series 1–1 (8–11 runs)

May 12–May 14, vs. St. Louis Cardinals

In a three-game home series hosting the Cardinals, the Red Sox lost the opener, 8–6. Making his first start of the season, James Paxton allowed two runs on four hits in five innings for a no decision. Boston entered the top of the ninth with a 6–5 lead, but closer Kenley Jansen allowed three runs on three hits for a blown save, and took the loss after Boston was unable to score in the bottom of the ninth. The second game of the series again saw St. Louis rally for three ninth-inning runs, defeating Boston, 4–3. Starter Chris Sale went eight innings, allowing one run on three hits. Jansen took the loss again, allowing three runs (two earned) on one hit and three walks. Rob Refsnyder had three hits and two RBIs, while Pablo Reyes had two hits in his Red Sox debut. On Sunday Night Baseball, the Cardinals completed the series sweep with a 9–1 victory. Starter Corey Kluber took the loss after allowing four runs on seven hits in five innings. Rafael Devers had two of Boston's five hits.

Red Sox lost the series 0–3 (10–21 runs)

May 15–May 17, vs. Seattle Mariners

Boston lost their fourth game in a row, falling 10–1 to Seattle in the opener of a three-game series at Fenway. Starter Tanner Houck allowed four runs on five hits in five innings and took the loss. Rafael Devers had the only Red Sox RBI. Position player Pablo Reyes pitched the ninth inning for Boston. The Red Sox ended their losing streak with a 9–4 win in the second game of the series. Starter Nick Pivetta earned the win after allowing four runs on six hits in 5 1/3 innings. Masataka Yoshida had three RBIs. In the final game of the series, Boston jumped out to an early 9–0 lead after two innings en route to a 12–3 victory. Starter Brayan Bello improved to 3–1 on the season after allowing one run on three hits in five innings. Red Sox batters had 16 hits, while Reyes led the team with four RBIs.

Red Sox won the series 2–1 (22–17 runs)

May 19–May 21, at San Diego Padres

Opening a three-game road series in San Diego, Rafael Devers homered twice as Boston won, 6–1. Starter James Paxton earned the win after allowing one run on five hits in six innings. The Red Sox won the second game of the series, 4–2. Starter Chris Sale earned the win after allowing two runs on three hits in seven innings. Kenley Jansen recorded his 10th save of the season, and Enmanuel Valdez had a three-run homer. Boston was shutout in the series' final game on Sunday, 7–0, despite outhitting the Padres. Starter Corey Kluber fell to 2–6 on the year after allowing five runs (one earned) on three hits in 2 1/3 innings.

Red Sox won the series 2–1 (10–10 runs)

May 22–May 24, at Los Angeles Angels

Boston lost the first game of a three-game road series against the Angels, 2–1. Tied 1–1 in the eighth inning, Red Sox reliever Kutter Crawford gave up a home run to Mickey Moniak, which proved to be the winning run. Starter Tanner Houck had a no decision after allowing one run on three hits in six innings. Masataka Yoshida had two of Boston's four hits and drove in the team's only run. The second game of the series was won by the Angels in a 4–0 shutout. Starter Brayan Bello took the loss after allowing two runs on six hits in seven innings. The Red Sox were limited to two hits. The Angels won the third game, 7–3, to complete the series sweep. Starter James Paxton took the loss, having allowed five runs on four hits in three innings. Connor Wong homered.

Red Sox lost the series 0–3 (4–13 runs)

May 26–May 28, at Arizona Diamondbacks

Boston won the opener of a three-game series in Arizona, 7–2. Starter Chris Sale improved to 5–2 on the year, earning the win after allowing one run on four hits in five innings. Kiké Hernández had a two-run homer, while Alex Verdugo and Triston Casas each had three hits. The Red Sox also won the middle game of the series, 2–1. Starter Garrett Whitlock earned the win after holding the Diamondbacks to one run on three hits in five innings. Kenley Jansen earned his 11th save of the season. Boston could not complete a sweep, falling to Arizona by a 4–2 score on Sunday. Starter Tanner Houck fell to 3–4 on the season, having allowed four runs on six hits in four innings.

Red Sox won the series 2–1 (11–7 runs)

May 30–May 31, vs. Cincinnati Reds

In the opener of a three-game series hosting Cincinnati, a five-run rally in the ninth inning by Boston came up a run short, as the Reds prevailed, 9–8. Starter Brayan Bello fell to 3–3 on the season despite only allowing one run on five hits in four innings. Reliever Joely Rodríguez surrendered five runs in 2/3 of an inning, including a grand slam to José Barrero. Raimel Tapia and Masataka Yoshida each had three hits for the Red Sox. The Red Sox lost the second game of the series, 5–4. Starter James Paxton had a no decision after allowing one run on four hits in five innings; reliever Josh Winckowski allowed three runs (all unearned) in 1 1/3 inning and took the loss.

The Red Sox exited May with a 28–27 record, at the bottom of the five-team American League East, 10 1/2 games behind the Rays.

June

=== June ===
Boston entered June with a 28–27 record, in last place of the American League East, having just lost the first two games of a three-game series at Fenway hosting the Reds.

June 1, vs. Cincinnati Reds (cont'd)

The Red Sox avoided being swept with an 8–2 win over the Reds. Starter Chris Sale left the game due to shoulder soreness after 3 2/3 innings, having allowed one run on five hits. He was followed by five relievers, with Chris Martin, who pitched the eighth inning, earning the win. Kiké Hernández had two hits, including a home run, and drove in three runs.

Red Sox lost the series 1–2 (20–16 runs)

June 3–June 5, vs. Tampa Bay Rays

The June 2 game against the Rays was postponed to June 5, due to rain. The four-game series already had a doubleheader slated for Saturday, resulting in the makeup game being placed on what had been a scheduled off day. Boston won the first game played on Saturday, 8–5. The Red Sox used six pitchers, with starter Garrett Whitlock getting a no decision, reliever Corey Kluber earning the win, and Kenley Jansen recording his 12th save of the season. Alex Verdugo had three hits and two RBIs. Saturday's second game was won by Tampa Bay, 4–2. Starter Kutter Crawford pitched three innings and had a no decision; Jansen took the loss after allowing two runs on three hits in the top of the ninth inning. Triston Casas was the only Boston batter to record two hits. The Rays won the Sunday afternoon game, 6–2. Starter Tanner Houck took the loss after allowing four runs on five hits in five innings. Verdugo again had three hits. Monday's makeup game was won by the Rays, 4–1. Starter Brayan Bello fell to 3–4 on the season after allowing three runs on six hits in six innings. Justin Turner homered for Boston's only run. The loss dropped the Red Sox to 30–30 on the season.

Red Sox lost the series 1–3 (13–19 runs)

June 6–June 8, at Cleveland Guardians

Boston won the opener of a three-game series in Cleveland, 5–4, largely due to a four-run eighth inning. Starter James Paxton went seven innings, allowing two runs on six hits, and earned the win. Kenley Jansen recorded his 13th save of the season. Masataka Yoshida had three hits, while Kiké Hernández drove in two runs. The Guardians won the middle game of the series, 5–2. The teams combined for five errors. Starter Kutter Crawford allowed three runs (two earned) on five hits in three innings, and fell to 1–3 on the season. Cleveland won the final game of the series, 10–3. Boston called up Matt Dermody from Triple-A for the start; he took the loss after allowing three runs on four hits in four innings. Corey Kluber gave up seven runs in 3 1/3 innings of relief. Triston Casas had two hits, including his seventh home run of the season. The loss dropped the Red Sox below .500 for the first time since April 28.

Red Sox lost the series 1–2 (10–19 runs)

June 9–June 11, at New York Yankees

Boston won the opener of a three-game series in The Bronx, 3–2. Starter Garrett Whitlock allowed two runs (one earned) on seven hits in 6 1/3 innings, earning the win. Kenley Jansen earned a save. Rafael Devers and Kiké Hernández both homered. The Yankees won the middle game of the series, 3–1. Tanner Houck fell to 3–6 on the season after allowing two runs on three hits in six innings. Devers again homered, for the only Red Sox run. In the final game of the series, the Red Sox defeated the Yankees, 3–2, in 10 innings on Sunday night. Hernández had two hits and drove in the winning run. Starter Brayan Bello had a no decision after allowing two runs on three hits in seven innings. Jansen pitched a scoreless ninth inning and earned the win, with Chris Martin earning the save.

Red Sox won the series 2–1 (7–7 runs)

June 12–June 14, vs. Colorado Rockies

The first game of a three-game home series was won by Colorado, 4–3, as Boston was not able to hold a 2–1 lead entering the eighth inning. Starter James Paxton had a no decision after allowing one unearned run on four hits in six innings. Reliever Nick Pivetta, who allowed two unearned runs in the top of the 10th inning, took the loss. The second game of the series was again an extra-innings win for the Rockies, 7–6. The Red Sox rallied from a 4–0 deficit to tie the game, 4–4, after six innings. In the 10th inning, Colorado scored three runs while Boston could only answer with two runs. Starter Kutter Crawford went four innings and had a no decision after allowing four runs on five hits. Justin Garza allowed three runs (two earned) on two hits in the 10th inning, and took the loss. Rafael Devers had two home runs and four RBIs. The final game of the series was delayed two hours by rain, then won by the Red Sox, 6–3. Starter Garrett Whitlock went seven innings, allowing two runs on six hits, for the win. Alex Verdugo had two hits and three RBIs.

Red Sox lost the series 1–2 (15–14 runs)

June 16–June 18, vs. New York Yankees

The Red Sox won the opener of a three-game home series against the Yankees, 15–5. Justin Turner had two home runs (one a grand slam) and six RBIs. Masataka Yoshida had four hits and three RBIs. Starter Tanner Houck was struck by a batted ball in the top of the fifth inning and had to leave the game. Reliever Joe Jaques entered the game, pitched two innings, and earned the win. The middle game of the series, scheduled for Saturday evening, was rained out and rescheduled for Sunday afternoon as the first game of a split doubleheader. In Sunday's first game, the Red Sox overcame two first-inning Yankee runs to win, 6–2. Kaleb Ort served as an opener, while Nick Pivetta, the second of three relievers, earned the win. Boston completed the series sweep with a 4–1 win on Sunday night. Starter Brayan Bello evened his record to 4–4 on the season, pitching seven innings while allowing one run on four hits. Kenley Jansen recorded his 15th save of the season.

Red Sox won the series 3–0 (25–8 runs)

June 19–June 22, at Minnesota Twins

Boston opened a four-game series in Minnesota with a 9–3 win. Starter James Paxton earned the win after pitching 6 1/3 innings while allowing three runs on three hits. Alex Verdugo had two hits and four RBIs. In the second game of the series, the Red Sox held a 3–0 lead after six innings that they expanded to 8–0 after seven innings; the Twins scored some late runs for a 10–4 final. Starter Kutter Crawford earned his second win of the year, holding Minnesota scoreless on six hits in five innings. Corey Kluber earned a three-inning save. Christian Arroyo was 5-for-5 with four RBIs. The Twins won the third game of the series, 5–4 in 10 innings. Tied at 4–4 after regulation, Boston was unable score in the top of the 10th inning, and Minnesota pushed across a run in the bottom of the inning for the win. Starter Garrett Whitlock had a no decision after allowing four runs on eight hits in seven innings. Kaleb Ort took the loss in relief. Catcher Reese McGuire left the game with an injury, later reported as an oblique strain. Justin Turner homered. Minnesota won the final game, 6–0, to split the series. Opener Justin Garza pitched the first inning, allowing three runs on four hits, and took the loss. The Red Sox were limited to three hits.

Red Sox split the series 2–2 (23–18 runs)

June 23–June 25, at Chicago White Sox

The Red Sox won the opener of a three-game series visiting the White Sox, 3–1. Starter Brayan Bello improved to 5–4 on the year, allowing one run on six hits in 6 2/3 innings. Rafael Devers hit his 18th home run of the season, and Kenley Jansen recorded his 16th save. Boston lost the middle game of the series, 5–4. Starter James Paxton had a no decision after allowing one run on two hits in four innings. With the score tied at 4–4 entering the bottom of the ninth, Jansen allowed one run on two hits and took the loss. Triston Casas homered. The Red Sox also lost the final game of the series, 4–1. Starter Kutter Crawford fell to 2–4 on the season after allowing four runs on five hits in six innings. Adam Duvall had two of Boston's five hits, and drove in the only run.

Red Sox lost the series 1–2 (8–10 runs)

June 27–June 29, at Miami Marlins

A three-game home series against the Marlins began with a 10–1 loss. Starter Garrett Whitlock fell to 4–3 on the season after allowing six runs on 11 hits in 4 2/3 innings. Triston Casas was 3-for-4 at the plate. Miami won the second game of the series, 6–2. Opener (baseball)|Opener Kaleb Ort went two innings while allowing one run on two hits. Nick Pivetta then pitched 3 1/3 innings, allowing two runs on one hit, and took the loss. Rafael Devers hit his 19th home run of the season. The Marlins completed the series sweep with a 2–0 win on Thursday. Starter Brayan Bello took the loss after allowing one run on two hits in seven innings. The Red Sox were limited to four hits.

Red Sox lost the series 0–3 (18–3 runs)

June 30, at Toronto Blue Jays

The Red Sox opened a three-game series in Toronto with a 5–0 win. Starter James Paxton earned the win having held the Blue Jays scoreless on three hits in 7 2/3 innings. Masataka Yoshida had three hits including a home run.

Boston ended June with a 41–42 record, in last place of the AL East, 15 games behind Tampa Bay.

July

=== July ===
The Red Sox entered July with a 41–42 record, having just won the first game of a three-game series in Toronto.

July 1–July 2, at Toronto Blue Jays (cont'd)

Boston won the middle game of the series, 7–6. Holding a 6–2 lead after six innings, the game went into the bottom of the ninth with a 7–5 score. The Blue Jays scored one run but then had Bo Bichette thrown out at the plate by Alex Verdugo to end the game. Start Kutter Crawford improved to 3–4 on the season after allowing two runs on three hits in 5 2/3 innings. Kenley Jansen recorded his 17th save of the season. Boston also won the final game by one run, 5–4, to complete the series sweep. Tied entering the ninth inning, a solo home run by Verdugo proved to be the winning margin. Jarren Duran had five hits and scored three runs. Starter Garrett Whitlock left the game after the first inning due to elbow tightness; he was followed by five relievers. Chris Martin pitched a scoreless eighth inning for the win, and Joe Jacques pitched a scoreless ninth inning to earn his first major-league save.

Red Sox won the series 3–0 (17–10 runs)

July 4–July 6, vs. Texas Rangers

The Red Sox fell to the Rangers, 6–2, to begin a three-game home series. Opener Brennan Bernardino had a no decision while the loss went to Kaleb Ort, the second of six Boston pitchers. A rain delay in the eighth inning lasted 107 minutes. The Red Sox won the middle game of the series, 4–2. Starter Brayan Bello improved to 6–5 on the season, allowing two runs on eight hits in seven innings. Kenley Jansen recorded his 18th save of the season. Justin Turner had two hits and two RBIs. The third game of the series was also won by Boston, 10–6, largely due to a six-run seventh inning. The team used six pitchers, with starter Kutter Crawford pitching four innings for a no decision, allowing three runs on seven hits. Josh Winckowski, who pitched the seventh and eighth innings without allowing a hit or run, got the win. Rafael Devers had two hits and two RBIs.

Red Sox won the series 2–1 (16–14 runs)

July 7–July 9, vs. Oakland Athletics

A three-game home series hosting the Athletics opened with a 7–3 Red Sox win. Opener Brennan Bernardino went two innings, allowing no runs and one hit. He was followed by Nick Pivetta, who earned the win after pitching five innings and allowing three runs (two earned) on four hits. Jarren Duran had two hits, including a triple, and an RBI. Boston won the middle game of the series, 10–3. Starter James Paxton allowed two runs on six hits in six innings and earned the win. Duran had three hits (including a home run), scored three runs, and drove in three runs. The Red Sox completed the series sweep with a 4–3 win on Sunday afternoon. Opener Tayler Scott was the first of six Boston pitchers. Chris Martin pitched the eighth inning and got the win, and Kenley Jansen recorded his 19th save of the season. Adam Duvall homered and drove in two runs.

Red Sox won the series 3–0 (21–9 runs)

July 11, MLB All-Star Game

Boston reached the All-Star Game break with a 48–43 record, two games out of a wild card spot. Kenley Jansen was the only Boston player selected to the game, played at T-Mobile Park in Seattle. Jansen pitched to one batter, recording a strikeout, as the American League fell to the National League, 3–2.

July 14–July 16, at Chicago Cubs

At Wrigley Field, Boston won the opener of a three-game series, 8–3. Starter Brayan Bello improved to 7–5 on the season after allowing three runs on eight hits in six innings. With the bases loaded and two outs in the bottom of the ninth inning, Kenley Jansen was brought in and recorded the final out for his 20th save of the season. The Red Sox hit six home runs, including two by Rafael Devers. Boston lost the middle game of the series, 10–4. Starter James Paxton took the loss after allowing six runs on three hits in three innings. Triston Casas hit his 11th home run of the season. The Red Sox won the final game of the series, 11–5, with all of the Cubs' runs coming in the final two innings. Starter Kutter Crawford held Chicago scoreless in six innings while only allowing one hit and four walks. Masataka Yoshida had three hits, including a home run, and drove in six runs.

Red Sox won the series 2–1 (23–18 runs)

July 17–July 19, at Oakland Athletics

The Red Sox began a three-game series in Oakland with a 7–0 win. Opener Brennan Bernardino pitched two innings and allowed the only hit the Athletics recorded. Nick Pivetta then pitched six innings while only allowing two walks; his 13 strikeouts set a new franchise record for the most strikeouts in a relief appearance. Connor Wong had three hits and drove in three runs. Boston lost the second game of the series, 3–0. Opener Joe Jacques allowed all three runs in 1 1/3 innings on four hits. Masataka Yoshida had two of Boston's five hits. Boston lost the final game of the series, 6–5. Starter Brayan Bello fell to 7–6 on the season, having allowed six runs on five hits (including three home runs) in four innings. Justin Turner drove in three runs while Adam Duvall was the only Boston batter with two hits.

Red Sox lost the series 1–2 (12–9 runs)

July 21–July 23, vs. New York Mets

The Friday night opener of a three-game home series was suspended with the Mets leading, 4–3, in the bottom of the fourth inning; it was set to resume at 2:10 p.m. on Saturday, with Saturday's scheduled game moved to a 7:10 p.m. start time. On Saturday afternoon, Friday's game was completed, with the Mets winning, 5–4. Boston starter Kutter Crawford took the loss after allowing four runs on four hits in four innings. Yu Chang had two RBIs. Saturday's regularly scheduled game was won by Boston, 8–6. Starter James Paxton improved to 6–2 on the season, having allowed three runs (two earned) on three hits in six innings. Kenley Jansen earned a save. Triston Casas had two home runs and Masataka Yoshida had three hits. The Red Sox won the final game of the series, 6–1, on Sunday evening. Opener Brennan Bernardino pitched 1 2/3 innings; he was followed by Chris Murphy who earned the win after pitching 3 2/3 innings while allowing one run on three hits. Adam Duvall had two hits and two RBIs.

Red Sox won the series 2–1 (18–12 runs)

July 25–July 26, vs. Atlanta Braves

The opening game of a two-game home series had its start delayed for over an hour by rain, then was won by the Red Sox, 7–1. The game featured a triple play by the Braves—it occurred in the bottom of the third inning with runners on first and second with no outs, and was scored by ESPN.com as: "Casas flied into triple play, center to first to third, Duvall doubled off first, Yoshida out at third." Opener John Schreiber pitched one inning and allowed the Braves' only run. He was followed by Nick Pivetta, who earned the win after only allowing three hits in five innings. Masataka Yoshida had three hits and two RBIs. Boston also won the second game of the series, 5–3. Starter Brayan Bello had a no decision after allowing three runs on four hits in six innings. Reliever Joe Jacques pitched an inning without allowing a hit or a run and earned the win. Kenley Jansen earned a save. Justin Turner had two hits and two RBIs.

Red Sox won the series 2–0 (12–4 runs)

July 28–July 30, at San Francisco Giants

Boston won the opener of a three-game road series in San Francisco, 3–2. Starter Kutter Crawford improved to 5–5 on the season after allowing one run on three hits in 5 2/3 innings. Kenley Jansen recorded his 23rd save of the season. Triston Casas had two hits, one of them a home run, and two RBIs. The Red Sox lost the middle game of the series, 3–2. Losing by two runs entering the ninth inning, Boston scored twice to tie the game, 2–2. In the bottom of the inning, Jansen's first pitch was hit for a walk-off home run by J. D. Davis. Starter James Paxton allowed one run on eight hits in five innings. Justin Turner had two hits and two RBIs. The final game of the series took 11 innings to decide, and was won by the Giants, 4–3. Opener Brennan Bernardino was the first of seven Red Sox pitchers; Mauricio Llovera allowed two hits in the 11th inning and took the loss. Turner again had two RBIs.

Red Sox lost the series 1–2 (8–9 runs)

July 31, at Seattle Mariners

The Red Sox lost the opener of the three-game series in Seattle, 6–2. Starter Nick Pivetta took the loss, having allowed three runs on five hits in 7 1/3 innings. Rafael Devers had three hits.

Boston ended July with a record of 56–50, in fourth place of the American League East and 2 1/2 games out of a wild card playoff berth.

August

=== August ===
The Red Sox entered August with a record of 56–50, having just lost the opener of a three-game series in Seattle.

August 1–August 2, at Seattle Mariners (cont'd)

The Red Sox won the middle game of the series, 6–4. Brayan Bello improved to 8–6 on the season after allowing four runs on eight hits in six innings. Kenley Jansen earned his 24th save while Reese McGuire returned to the lineup and hit his first home run of the season. Seattle won the final game of the series, 6–3. Boston starter Kutter Crawford had a no decision after holding the Mariners scoreless on four hits in five innings. Reliever John Schreiber allowed four runs on three hits in one inning and took the loss. Jarren Duran had a two-run homer.

Red Sox lost the series 1–2 (11–16 runs)

August 4–August 6, vs. Toronto Blue Jays

The Red Sox lost the opener of a three-game series hosting the Blue Jays, 7–3. Starter James Paxton allowed four runs on nine hits in five innings and took the loss. Jarren Duran had three hits, including a home run. The middle game of the series was also won by Toronto, 5–4. Opener (baseball)|Opener John Schreiber pitched a scoreless first inning, while Nick Pivetta pitched the next four innings while allowing three runs on six hits. Brennan Bernardino, the third of six Red Sox pitchers, allowed one run and three hits in one-third of an inning and took the loss. Rafael Devers had two hits, including a home run, and three RBIs. The Blue Jays completed the series sweep with a 13–1 win on Sunday afternoon. Bernardino pitched the first inning as an opener, allowing no runs on two hits. He was followed by Chris Murphy who allowed six runs on seven hits in 2 1/3 innings and took the loss. Boston's only run came on a Triston Casas homer.

Red Sox lost the series 0–3 (8–25 runs)

August 7–August 10, vs. Kansas City Royals

The Red Sox ended their four-game losing streak with a 6–2 win over the Royals at Fenway. Tied at 2–2 in the bottom of the ninth inning with two outs, Pablo Reyes hit a walk-off grand slam. Starter Brayan Bello had a no decision after allowing one run on six hits in 6 2/3 innings. Closer Kenley Jansen got the win. Boston lost the second game of the series, 9–3. Starter Kutter Crawford took the loss after allowing three runs on seven hits in 3 1/3 innings. Adam Duvall homered. The Red Sox won the third game of the series, 4–3. Starter Nick Pivetta went five innings and earned the win after allowing two runs on four hits. Jansen recorded his 25th save of the season. Alex Verdugo drove in two runs. The Red Sox won the final game of the series, 2–0. Starter James Paxton earned the win, pitching 5 1/3 scoreless innings while allowing six hits. Jansen earned another save, while Duvall had two hits and one RBI.

Red Sox won the series 3–1 (15–14 runs)

August 11–August 13, vs. Detroit Tigers

The Red Sox opened a three-game home series with a 5–2 win over the Tigers. Starter Chris Sale returned from the 60-day injured list and pitched 4 2/3 innings while allowing two runs on one hit while striking out seven batters. Kyle Barraclough got the win after pitching the next 1 1/3 innings. Chris Murphy then pitched the final three innings for a save. Triston Casas had a three-run home run. Detroit won the middle game of the series, 6–2. Boston starter Brayan Bello took the loss after allowing four runs on nine hits in 4 2/3 innings. Justin Turner homered. The Red Sox won the final game of the series, 6–3. Starter Kutter Crawford allowed two runs on three hits in 4 2/3 innings and had a no decision. Garrett Whitlock, the second of four Boston relievers, got the win. Kenley Jansen earned a save. Adam Duvall drove in four runs, while Trevor Story had four hits.

Red Sox won the series 2–1 (13–11 runs)

August 15–August 17, at Washington Nationals

Boston opened a three-game series in D.C. with a 5–4 win. Starter Nick Pivetta had a no decision after allowing four runs on five hits in 4 1/3 innings. John Schreiber, the second of five relievers, earned the win, while Kenley Jansen earned his 28th save of the season. Triston Casas had two hits and two RBIs. The Nationals won the series' second game, 6–2. Boston starter James Paxton allowed two runs on five hits in six innings and had a no decision. Reliever Garrett Whitlock allowed four runs on three hits in the eighth inning and took the loss. Pablo Reyes had a two-run home run. The final game of the series was also won by Washington, 10–7. Trailing 9–1 entering the seventh inning, Boston scored six runs, four on a grand slam by Luis Urías, but could not rally further. Starter Chris Sale took the loss after allowing three runs (two earned) on two hits and three walks in 4 1/3 innings.

Red Sox lost the series 1–2 (14–20 runs)

August 18–August 20, at New York Yankees

In the Bronx, the Red Sox opened a three-game series with an 8–3 win. Starter Brayan Bello earned the win after allowing one run on six hits in six innings. Masataka Yoshida had two hits and four RBIs., while Rafael Devers and Justin Turner each had three hits and two RBIs. Boston won the second game of the series, 8–1, with four runs coming on a second-inning grand slam by Luis Urías. Devers and Pablo Reyes each had three hits and an RBI. Starter Kutter Crawford earned the win after allowing one run on one hit in six innings. The Red Sox completed the series sweep with a 6–5 win on Sunday afternoon. Opener Josh Winckowski pitched a scoreless first inning; he was followed by Nick Pivetta who allowed two runs on three hits in five innings. The win went to Chris Martin, who pitched a scoreless eighth inning; Kenley Jansen pitched the ninth and earned a save. It was the Yankees' eighth consecutive loss.

Red Sox won the series 3–0 (22–9 runs)

August 21–August 24, at Houston Astros

In a game with 27 total hits, Boston lost the opener of a four-game set in Houston, 9–4. Adam Duvall had three hits, including a first-inning three-run home run. The Red Sox were 3-for-18 at the plate with runners in scoring position. Starter James Paxton took the loss after allowing seven runs (six earned) on nine hits in four innings. Boston also lost the second game of the series, 7–3. Starter Tanner Houck, in his return from the injured list, took the loss after allowing three runs on four hits in five innings. Justin Turner had two hits and drove in two runs, while Wilyer Abreu was 2-for-3 in his MLB debut. The third game of the series was won by the Red Sox, 7–5, in 10 innings. After the Astros jumped out to an early 3–0 lead, the Red Sox tied the game at 4–4 in the fifth inning. That remained the score into the 10th inning, when Boston outscored Houston, 3–1. Starter Chris Sale allowed four runs on six hits in five innings. Kenley Jansen left the game with an apparent injury in the ninth inning; he was replaced by Nick Pivetta, who earned the win. Josh Winckowski pitched the 10th inning and earned the save. Duvall had two hits, including a home run, and three RBIs. In the final game of the series, Boston's offense produced 24 hits in a 17–1 win. Abreu, Alex Verdugo, and Connor Wong each had four hits. Starter Brayan Bello recorded his 10th win of the season after allowing one run on nine hits in seven innings.

Red Sox split the series 2–2 (31–22 runs)

August 25–August 27, vs. Los Angeles Dodgers

The opener of a three-game series at Fenway was won by the Dodgers, 7–4. Boston starter Kutter Crawford had a no decision after allowing two runs on four hits in five innings. The loss went to reliever Nick Pivetta, who allowed four runs on four hits in two innings. Alex Verdugo had three hits, including a first-inning home run. The middle game of the series was an 8–5 Boston win. Starter James Paxton went 4 1/3 innings and received a no decision, having allowed four runs on four hits. Brennan Bernardino, the third of six Boston pitchers, recorded the final out of the sixth inning and was credited with the win. John Schreiber pitched a scoreless ninth inning for the save. Justin Turner had three hits and two RBIs, while Adam Duvall had two hits and three RBIs. Shortstop Pablo Reyes exited the game with left elbow discomfort. The Dodgers won the final game of the series, 7–4. Boston starter Tanner Houck allowed one run on five hits in four innings and took the loss. Triston Casas had a two-run home run.

Red Sox lost the series 1–2 (16–19 runs)

August 28–August 30, vs. Houston Astros

Boston opened a three-game home series with a 13–5 loss to Houston. The Red Sox held a 4–3 lead after five innings, but the Astros pushed across six runs in the sixth inning. Starter Chris Sale had a no decision after allowing three runs on seven hits in 4 2/3 innings. Reliever Kyle Barraclough took the loss after allowing 10 runs on 11 hits in 4 1/3 innings. Masataka Yoshida had three hits, while Jose Altuve of the Astros hit for the cycle. The second game of the series also saw the Red Sox lose, 6–2. Starter Brayan Bello fell to 10–8 on the season after allowing three runs (two earned) on four hits in 4 2/3 innings. Adam Duvall hit his 18th home run of the season. The Astros completed the series sweep with a 7–4 win on Wednesday afternoon. Boston starter Kutter Crawford took the loss after allowing six runs on seven hits in 2 2/3 innings. Triston Casas had three hits.

Red Sox lost the series 0–3 (11–26 runs)

The Red Sox reached the end of August with a record of 69–65, having gone 13–15 during the month, in fourth place of the American League East and 6 1/2 games out of a wild card playoff berth.

September / October

=== September ===
The Red Sox entered September with a record of 69–65, having just had an off day following four consecutive losses.

September 1–September 3, at Kansas City Royals

The Red Sox opened September with a 13–2 loss in Kansas City, the first game of a three-game series. Beat writer Peter Abraham of The Boston Globe called it "one of the ugliest losses in franchise history." Starter James Paxton allowed six runs on five hits in 1 1/3 innings and took the loss. The other seven runs were allow by reliever Brandon Walter in four innings of work. Alex Verdugo had a two-run home run. Boston won the middle game of the series, 9–5, after jumping out to an 8–1 lead through four innings. Starter Tanner Houck earned the win after allowing four runs on seven hits in five innings. Nick Pivetta pitched the final three innings to earn a save. Verdugo had three hits while Triston Casas hit his 22nd home run of the season. The Red Sox won the final game of the series, 7–3, on Sunday afternoon. Starter Chris Sale earned his sixth win of the season, allowing no runs on two hits in five innings. Masataka Yoshida had two hits, including a three-run home run.

Red Sox won the series 2–1 (18–21 runs)

September 4–September 6, at Tampa Bay Rays

Boston won the opener of a three-game road series, 7–3. Brayan Bello earned his 11th win of the season, having allowed three runs on five hits in six innings. Triston Casas had two hits, including his 23rd home run of the season, and four RBIs. The second game of the series was tied, 5–5, after nine innings; Tampa Bay won, 8–6, on a walk-off home run by Brandon Lowe in the 11th inning. Boston started Kutter Crawford had a no decision after allowing five runs on three hits in 3 2/3 innings. Kenley Jansen took the loss after allowing three runs (two earned) on a hit and a walk without retiring a batter in the 11th. Ceddanne Rafaela had three hits. The final game of the series was also won by the Rays, 3–1. Boston starter Nick Pivetta took the loss, having allowed three runs on seven hits in 4 2/3 innings. Connor Wong drove in Boston's only run.

Red Sox lost the series 1–2 (14–14 runs)

September 8–September 10, vs. Baltimore Orioles

A Baltimore win, 11–2, opened a three-game series at Fenway. Stater Tanner Houck fell to 4–9 for the season, having allowed five runs on eight hits in 5 1/3 innings. Connor Wong had two of Boston's four hits. In the middle game of the series, the two teams combined for 25 runs and 37 hits—it was won by the Orioles, 13–12. The start of the game was delayed for approximately 90 minutes by rain. Red Sox starting pitcher Chris Sale took the loss after allowing seven runs (six earned) on six hits in four innings. Wilyer Abreu was 5-for-5 with three RBIs. Boston avoided a sweep with a 7–3 win on Sunday. The game's start was again delayed by rain (42 minutes) and also had a delay in the eighth inning (88 minutes). Brayan Bello earned his 12th win of the season after allowing three runs on seven hits in five innings. Triston Casas hit a three-run homer.

Red Sox lost the series 1–2 (21–27 runs)

September 11–September 14, vs. New York Yankees

The opening game of a four-game home series, scheduled for Monday evening, was postponed due to rain, resulting in a day-night doubleheader being scheduled for Tuesday. On Tuesday, the Yankees won both games; 3–2 and 4–1. In the first game, Boston starter Nick Pivetta fell to 9–9 on the season after allowing three runs on four hits in 5 1/3 innings. Triston Casas had three hits. In the second game, starter Kutter Crawford allowed one run on three hits in 4 1/3 innings and had a no decision. Josh Winckowski, the first of six Boston relievers, allowed one run on one hit in 1 1/3 innings and took the loss. Kenley Jansen left the game abruptly after facing two batters in the ninth inning; the next day, he was placed on the COVID-related injured list. Ceddanne Rafaela was the only Boston batter with two hits. Wednesday night's game was also postponed due to rain, resulting in another day-night doubleheader being scheduled for Thursday. The teams split their doubleheader on Thursday, with Boston winning the first game, 5–0, and New York winning the second game, 8–5. Starter Tanner Houck got the win in the first game, having pitched six scoreless innings while allowing four hits. Wilyer Abreu had three hits and Trevor Story had a three-run homer. Nick Robertson served as the Red Sox opener in the second game. Mauricio Llovera, the fifth of six Boston pitchers, took the loss after allowing the go-ahead run in the eighth inning. Rafael Devers had three hits, including his 31st home run of the season.

Red Sox lost the series 1–3 (13–15 runs)

September 15–September 17, at Toronto Blue Jays

With a 3–0 loss to the Blue Jays to open a three-game road series, the Red Sox fell to 74–74 for the season. Starter Brayan Bello allowed three runs on four hits in six innings and took the loss. Justin Turner had two of Boston's five hits. Toronto also won the second game of the series, 4–3 in extra innings, dropping the Red Sox below .500 for the season. Starter Chris Sale had a no decision after allowing one run on two hits in six innings. Mauricio Llovera, the eighth Boston pitcher of the game, took the loss after allowing the winning run in the 13th inning. Rafael Devers had a two-run home run. The Blue Jays completed their series sweep with a 3–2 win on Sunday afternoon. Starter Nick Pivetta allowed two runs on four hits in 6 1/3 innings and had a no decision. Garrett Whitlock allowed the winning run in the ninth inning and took the loss. Devers homered again.

Red Sox lost the series 0–3 (5–10 runs)

September 18–September 20, at Texas Rangers

The Red Sox won the first game of a three-game series in Arlington, 4–2. Starter Kutter Crawford had a no decision after allowing two runs on four hits in six innings. Josh Winckowski, the first of three Boston relievers, pitched one scoreless inning and was credited with the win. Chris Martin pitched a scoreless ninth inning and earned a save. Rob Refsnyder had two RBIs. The Rangers won the middle game of the series, 6–4. Red Sox starter Tanner Houck had a no decision after allowing two runs on three hits in four innings. Chris Murphy, the third of five Boston relievers, allowed two runs in one-third of an inning and took the loss. Masataka Yoshida had two RBIs. The final game of the series was a 15–5 Texas win. Starter Brayan Bello took the loss after allowing eight runs on eight hits in three innings. Adam Duvall hit a three-run home run. This loss, coupled with a win by Toronto a few hours later, eliminated the Red Sox from postseason contention.

Red Sox lost the series 1–2 (13–23 runs)

September 22–September 24, vs. Chicago White Sox

Boston's final homestand of the season began with a 3–2 win over the White Sox. Starter Chris Sale had a no decision after allowing no runs on three hits in five innings. Mauricio Llovera pitched the eighth inning and earned the win, while Chris Martin pitched the ninth inning and earned a save. Trevor Story had three hits. The middle game of the series was won by Chicago, 1–0. Starter Nick Pivetta pitched seven scoreless innings and had a no decision. Josh Winckowski pitched the final two innings, allowing one run on two hits, and took the loss. Masataka Yoshida had three hits. The White Sox won the final game of the series, 3–2, with the game shortened to six innings due to rain. Starter Kutter Crawford took the loss after allowing three runs on four hits in 5 1/3 innings. Adam Duvall and Wilyer Abreu both homered.

Red Sox lost the series 1–2 (5–6 runs)

September 26–September 27, vs. Tampa Bay Rays

The final home series of the season, a two-game set, began with a 9–7 loss to Tampa Bay. Starter Tanner Houck fell to 5–10 on the season after allowing seven runs (six earned) on 10 hits in three innings. Enmanuel Valdez had three hits and four RBIs. The Rays also won the second game of the series, 5–0, giving Boston 82 losses and ensuring a losing record for the season. Starter Brayan Bello fell to 12–11 for the season after allowing five runs on nine hits in six innings. Boston was limited to three hits.

Red Sox lost the series 0–2 (7–14 runs)

September 28–October 1, at Baltimore Orioles

Boston's final series of the season opened with a 2–0 loss at Camden Yards. Starter Chris Sale fell to 6–5 on the season after allowing one run on three hits in five innings. Boston was again limited to three hits. The Red Sox won the second game of the series, 3–0. Starter Nick Pivetta improved to 10–9 on the season after holding the Orioles to two hits in seven innings. Garrett Whitlock pitched the final two innings and earned a save. Trevor Story had a two-run home run. Boston lost their penultimate game of the season, 5–2. Starter Kutter Crawford had a no decision after allowing only a single hit in six innings. Reliever Josh Winckowski allowed two runs on three hits in one inning and took the loss. Masataka Yoshida had three hits. Boston won their final game of the season, 6–1. Starter Tanner Houck earned the win after allowing just one hit through six innings. Rafael Devers drove in his 100th run of the season. The Red Sox were limited to five hits but the Orioles committed three errors.

Red Sox split the series 2–2 (11–8 runs)

With an overall record of 78–84, the Red Sox finished in last place of the American League East.

== Season standings ==
=== American League East ===
AL East
Team	W	L	Pct.	GB	Home	Road
Baltimore Orioles	101	61	.623	—	49‍–‍32	52‍–‍29
Tampa Bay Rays	99	63	.611	2	53‍–‍28	46‍–‍35
Toronto Blue Jays	89	73	.549	12	43‍–‍38	46‍–‍35
New York Yankees	82	80	.506	19	42‍–‍39	40‍–‍41
Boston Red Sox	78	84	.481	23	39‍–‍42	39‍–‍42

=== American League Wild Card ===
Division leaders
Team	W	L	Pct.
Baltimore Orioles	101	61	.623
Houston Astros	90	72	.556
Minnesota Twins	87	75	.537

Wild Card teams (Top 3 teams qualify for postseason)
Team	W	L	Pct.	GB
Tampa Bay Rays	99	63	.611	+10
Texas Rangers	90	72	.556	+1
Toronto Blue Jays	89	73	.549	—
Seattle Mariners	88	74	.543	1
New York Yankees	82	80	.506	7
Boston Red Sox	78	84	.481	11
Detroit Tigers	78	84	.481	11
Cleveland Guardians	76	86	.469	13
Los Angeles Angels	73	89	.451	16
Chicago White Sox	61	101	.377	28
Kansas City Royals	56	106	.346	33
Oakland Athletics	50	112	.309	39

=== Red Sox team leaders ===
Batting
Batting average†	Masataka Yoshida	.289
Home runs	Rafael Devers	33
Hits	Rafael Devers	157
RBIs	Rafael Devers	100
Runs scored	Rafael Devers	90
Games played	Rafael Devers	153
Stolen bases	Jarren Duran	24
Pitching
ERA‡	N/A	–
WHIP‡	N/A	–
Wins	Brayan Bello	12
Innings pitched	Brayan Bello	157
Games started	Brayan Bello	28
Strikeouts	Nick Pivetta	183
Saves	Kenley Jansen	29
Games pitched	Josh Winckowski	60

Updated through end of the season.
† Minimum 3.1 plate appearances per team games played
AVG qualified batters: Casas, Devers, Turner, Verdugo, Yoshida
‡ Minimum 1 inning pitched per team games played
ERA & WHIP qualified pitchers: none

=== Record vs. opponents ===
==== Record vs. American League ====
2023 American League record Source: MLB Standings Grid – 2023
Team	BAL	BOS	CWS	CLE	DET	HOU	KC	LAA	MIN	NYY	OAK	SEA	TB	TEX	TOR	NL
Baltimore	—	7–6	4–2	3–4	6–1	3–3	5–1	5–2	4–2	7–6	6–1	4–2	8–5	3–3	10–3	26–20
Boston	6–7	—	2–4	3–3	5–1	2–5	5–2	3–4	4–3	9–4	4–2	3–3	2–11	3–3	7–6	20–26
Chicago	2–4	4–2	—	8–5	5–8	3–4	6–7	3–4	4–9	4–2	3–4	2–4	1–6	1–5	0–6	15–31
Cleveland	4–3	3–3	5–8	—	4–9	2–4	7–6	3–4	7–6	2–4	5–1	4–3	3–3	3–3	4–3	20–26
Detroit	1–6	1–5	8–5	9–4	—	3–3	10–3	3–3	8–5	2–5	3–4	3–3	1–5	3–4	2–4	21–25
Houston	3–3	5–2	4–3	4–2	3–3	—	1–5	9–4	2–4	2–5	10–3	4–9	3–3	9–4	3–4	28–18
Kansas City	1–5	2–5	7–6	6–7	3–10	5–1	—	2–4	4–9	2–4	2–4	1–6	3–4	1–5	1–6	16–30
Los Angeles	2–5	4–3	4–3	4–3	3–3	4–9	4–2	—	3–3	4–2	7–6	5–8	2–4	6–7	2–4	19–27
Minnesota	2–4	3–4	9–4	6–7	5–8	4–2	9–4	3–3	—	4–3	5–1	3–4	1–5	5–2	3–3	25–21
New York	6–7	4–9	2–4	4–2	5–2	5–2	4–2	2–4	3–4	—	5–1	4–2	5–8	3–4	7–6	23–23
Oakland	1–6	2–4	4–3	1–5	4–3	3–10	4–2	6–7	1–5	1–5	—	1–12	2–5	4–9	2–4	14–32
Seattle	2–4	3–3	4–2	3–4	3–3	9–4	6–1	8–5	4–3	2–4	12–1	—	3–4	4–9	3–3	22–24
Tampa Bay	5–8	11–2	6–1	3–3	5–1	3–3	4–3	4–2	5–1	8–5	5–2	4–3	—	2–4	7–6	27–19
Texas	3–3	3–3	5–1	3–3	4–3	4–9	5–1	7–6	2–5	4–3	9–4	9–4	4–2	—	6–1	22–24
Toronto	3–10	6–7	6–0	3–4	4–2	4–3	6–1	4–2	3–3	6–7	4–2	3–3	6–7	1–6	—	30–16

Updated with the results of all games through October 1, 2023.

==== Record vs. National League ====
2023 American League record vs. National League Source: MLB Standings
Team	ARI	ATL	CHC	CIN	COL	LAD	MIA	MIL	NYM	PHI	PIT	SD	SF	STL	WSH
Baltimore	2–1	1–2	1–2	1–2	2–1	1–2	3–0	1–2	3–0	1–2	2–1	1–2	2–1	1–2	4–0
Boston	2–1	3–1	2–1	1–2	1–2	1–2	0–3	2–1	2–1	2–1	0–3	2–1	1–2	0–3	1–2
Chicago	1–2	2–1	1–3	2–1	1–2	1–2	1–2	0–3	1–2	1–2	1–2	0–3	1–2	1–2	1–2
Cleveland	1–2	1–2	2–1	2–2	1–2	1–2	1–2	1–2	0–3	2–1	2–1	1–2	1–2	2–1	2–1
Detroit	0–3	1–2	1–2	1–2	2–1	1–2	1–2	2–1	3–0	0–3	2–2	1–2	3–0	2–1	1–2
Houston	3–0	3–0	3–0	0–3	3–1	1–2	2–1	1–2	2–1	1–2	2–1	2–1	1–2	2–1	2–1
Kansas City	1–2	0–3	1–2	0–3	1–2	2–1	0–3	0–3	3–0	1–2	0–3	2–1	2–1	2–2	1–2
Los Angeles	1–2	1–2	3–0	0–3	1–2	0–4	0–3	1–2	2–1	1–2	2–1	0–3	2–1	3–0	2–1
Minnesota	3–0	0–3	2–1	2–1	2–1	1–2	1–2	2–2	2–1	2–1	2–1	2–1	1–2	2–1	1–2
New York	2–1	0–3	1–2	3–0	1–2	2–1	1–2	1–2	2–2	2–1	2–1	2–1	2–1	1–2	1–2
Oakland	1–2	2–1	0–3	1–2	2–1	0–3	0–3	3–0	0–3	0–3	2–1	0–3	2–2	1–2	0–3
Seattle	2–1	1–2	1–2	1–2	3–0	0–3	2–1	0–3	1–2	1–2	2–1	3–1	2–1	2–1	1–2
Tampa Bay	2–1	1–2	1–2	2–1	3–0	2–1	3–1	2–1	1–2	0–3	3–0	1–2	2–1	1–2	3–0
Texas	1–3	1–2	1–2	0–3	3–0	1–2	3–0	0–3	2–1	3–0	2–1	0–3	2–1	2–1	1–2
Toronto	3–0	3–0	1–2	2–1	2–1	2–1	2–1	2–1	3–0	1–3	3–0	1–2	2–1	1–2	2–1

Updated with the results of all games through October 1, 2023.

=== Game log ===
Red Sox Win	Red Sox Loss	Game postponed	Eliminated from Playoff Race

2023 Boston Red Sox Season Game Log: 78–84 (Home: 39–42; Away: 39–42)
March / April: 15–14 (Home: 9–7; Away: 6–7)

#	Date	Opponent	Score	Win	Loss	Save	Stadium	Attendance	Record	Box/ Streak
1	March 30	Orioles	9–10	Gibson (1–0)	Kluber (0–1)	Bautista (1)	Fenway Park	36,049	0–1	L1
2	April 1	Orioles	9–8	Jansen (1–0)	Bautista (0–1)	—	Fenway Park	29,062	1–1	W1
3	April 2	Orioles	9–5	Houck (1–0)	Irvin (0–1)	—	Fenway Park	27,886	2–1	W2
4	April 3	Pirates	6–7	Underwood Jr. (1–0)	Crawford (0–1)	Bednar (2)	Fenway Park	28,369	2–2	L1
5	April 4	Pirates	1–4	Contreras (1–0)	Pivetta (0–1)	Bednar (3)	Fenway Park	28,842	2–3	L2
6	April 5	Pirates	1–4	Keller (1–0)	Kluber (0–2)	Underwood Jr. (1)	Fenway Park	24,477	2–4	L3
7	April 6	@ Tigers	6–3	Sale (1–0)	Turnbull (0–2)	Jansen (1)	Comerica Park	44,650	3–4	W1
8	April 8	@ Tigers	14–5	Houck (2–0)	Wentz (0–2)	—	Comerica Park	21,835	4–4	W2
9	April 9	@ Tigers	4–1	Crawford (1–1)	Boyd (0–1)	Jansen (2)	Comerica Park	14,885	5–4	W3
10	April 10	@ Rays	0–1	Poche (1–0)	Martin (0–1)	Fairbanks (1)	Tropicana Field	13,470	5–5	L1
11	April 11	@ Rays	2–7	McClanahan (3–0)	Whitlock (0–1)	—	Tropicana Field	12,649	5–6	L2
12	April 12	@ Rays	7–9	Bradley (1–0)	Sale (1–1)	Fairbanks (2)	Tropicana Field	17,136	5–7	L3
13	April 13	@ Rays	3–9	Kelly (1–0)	Kluber (0–3)	Bristo (1)	Tropicana Field	21,175	5–8	L4
14	April 14	Angels	5–3	Winckowksi (1–0)	Herget (0–2)	Jansen (3)	Fenway Park	36,680	6–8	W1
15	April 15	Angels	9–7	Brasier (1–0)	Tepera (1–1)	Jansen (4)	Fenway Park	36,594	7–8	W2
16	April 16	Angels	2–1	Whitlock (1–1)	Detmers (0–1)	Brasier (1)	Fenway Park	34,790	8–8	W3
17	April 17	Angels	4–5	Davidson (1–1)	Bello (0–1)	Estévez (2)	Fenway Park	34,942	8–9	L1
18	April 18	Twins	5–4 (10)	Schreiber (1–0)	Morán (0–1)	—	Fenway Park	28,132	9–9	W1
19	April 19	Twins	4–10	Ryan (4–0)	Kluber (0–4)	Headrick (1)	Fenway Park	30,027	9–10	L1
20	April 20	Twins	11–5	Houck (3–0)	Maeda (0–3)	—	Fenway Park	34,427	10–10	W1
21	April 21	@ Brewers	5–3	Pivetta (1–1)	Peralta (2–2)	Jansen (5)	American Family Field	24,976	11–10	W2
22	April 22	@ Brewers	4–5	Miley (3–1)	Whitlock (1–2)	Williams (3)	American Family Field	31,965	11–11	L1
23	April 23	@ Brewers	12–5	Ort (1–0)	Bush (0–1)	—	American Family Field	26,939	12–11	W1
24	April 24	@ Orioles	4–5	Kremer (2–0)	Sale (1–2)	Canó (1)	Camden Yards	11,811	12–12	L1
25	April 25	@ Orioles	8–6	Kluber (1–4)	Bradish (1–1)	Jansen (6)	Camden Yards	14,343	13–12	W1
26	April 26	@ Orioles	2–6	Wells (1–1)	Houck (3–1)	—	Camden Yards	12,044	13–13	L1
27	April 28	Guardians	2–5	Bieber (2–1)	Pivetta (1–2)	Clase (9)	Fenway Park	30,578	13–14	L2
28	April 29	Guardians	8–7 (10)	Bernardino (1–0)	Clase (1–2)	—	Fenway Park	31,717	14–14	W1
29	April 30	Guardians	7–1	Sale (2–2)	Allen (1–1)	—	Fenway Park	29,395	15–14	W2

May: 13–13 (Home: 6–6; Away: 7–7)

#	Date	Opponent	Score	Win	Loss	Save	Stadium	Attendance	Record	Box/ Streak
30	May 1	Blue Jays	6–5	Winckowksi (2–0)	Romano (2–2)	—	Fenway Park	27,438	16–14	W3
31	May 2	Blue Jays	7–6	Bleier (1–0)	Swanson (1–1)	Winckowski (1)	Fenway Park	27,721	17–14	W4
32	May 3	Blue Jays	8–3	Pivetta (2–2)	Manoah (1–2)	—	Fenway Park	27,963	18–14	W5
33	May 4	Blue Jays	11–5	Bello (1–1)	Gausman (2–3)	—	Fenway Park	30,173	19–14	W6
34	May 5	@ Phillies	5–3	Sale (3–2)	Wheeler (3–2)	Jansen (7)	Citizens Bank Park	43,322	20–14	W7
35	May 6	@ Phillies	7–4	Kluber (2–4)	Falter (0–6)	Jansen (8)	Citizens Bank Park	43,832	21–14	W8
36	May 7	@ Phillies	1–6	Walker (3–2)	Houck (3–2)	Strahm (1)	Citizens Bank Park	44,669	21–15	L1
37	May 9	@ Braves	3–9	Morton (4–3)	Pivetta (2–3)	—	Truist Park	36,805	21–16	L2
38	May 10	@ Braves	5–2	Bello (2–1)	Minter (2–4)	Jansen (9)	Truist Park	40,270	22–16	W1
39	May 12	Cardinals	6–8	Helsley (1–2)	Jansen (1–1)	—	Fenway Park	34,553	22–17	L1
40	May 13	Cardinals	3–4	Pallante (2–0)	Jansen (1–2)	Gallegos (3)	Fenway Park	35,935	22–18	L2
41	May 14	Cardinals	1–9	Mikolas (2–1)	Kluber (2–5)	—	Fenway Park	27,732	22–19	L3
42	May 15	Mariners	1–10	Kirby (5–2)	Houck (3–3)	—	Fenway Park	31,744	22–20	L4
43	May 16	Mariners	9–4	Pivetta (3–3)	Castillo (2–2)	—	Fenway Park	31,476	23–20	W1
44	May 17	Mariners	12–3	Bello (3–1)	Gonzales (3–1)	—	Fenway Park	32,209	24–20	W2
45	May 19	@ Padres	6–1	Paxton (1–0)	Snell (1–6)	Winckowski (2)	Petco Park	41,530	25–20	W3
46	May 20	@ Padres	4–2	Sale (4–2)	Musgrove (1–2)	Jansen (10)	Petco Park	40,215	26–20	W4
47	May 21	@ Padres	0–7	Wacha (5–1)	Kluber (2–6)	—	Petco Park	42,825	26–21	L1
48	May 22	@ Angels	1–2	Silseth (1–1)	Crawford (1–2)	—	Angel Stadium	25,314	26–22	L2
49	May 23	@ Angels	0–4	Canning (3–2)	Bello (3–2)	—	Angel Stadium	25,798	26–23	L3
50	May 24	@ Angels	3–7	Anderson (2–0)	Paxton (1–1)	—	Angel Stadium	26,596	26–24	L4
51	May 26	@ Diamondbacks	7–2	Sale (5–2)	Pfaadt (0–2)	—	Chase Field	25,467	27–24	W1
52	May 27	@ Diamondbacks	2–1	Whitlock (2–2)	Davies (0–1)	Jansen (11)	Chase Field	29,142	28–24	W2
53	May 28	@ Diamondbacks	2–4	Kelly (6–3)	Houck (3–4)	Castro (5)	Chase Field	26,051	28–25	L1
54	May 30	Reds	8–9	Lively (3–2)	Bello (3–3)	Díaz (13)	Fenway Park	31,642	28–26	L2
55	May 31	Reds	4–5	Gibaut (5–1)	Winckowski (2–1)	Farmer (1)	Fenway Park	32,593	28–27	L3

June: 13–15 (Home: 6–8; Away: 7–7)

#	Date	Opponent	Score	Win	Loss	Save	Stadium	Attendance	Record	Box/ Streak
56	June 1	Reds	8–2	Martin (1–1)	Herget (1–2)	—	Fenway Park	31,204	29–27	W1
—	June 2	Rays	Postponed (rain); Makeup: June 5							
57	June 3 (1)	Rays	8–5	Kluber (3–6)	Beeks (2–3)	Jansen (12)	Fenway Park	31,303	30–27	W2
58	June 3 (2)	Rays	2–4	Faucher (1–1)	Jansen (1–3)	Adam (8)	Fenway Park	30,784	30–28	L1
59	June 4	Rays	2–6	Bradley (4–2)	Houck (3–5)	—	Fenway Park	34,192	30–29	L2
60	June 5	Rays	1–4	McClanahan (9–1)	Bello (3–4)	Adam (9)	Fenway Park	30,860	30–30	L3
61	June 6	@ Guardians	5–4	Paxton (2–1)	De Los Santos (2–1)	Jansen (13)	Progressive Field	21,471	31–30	W1
62	June 7	@ Guardians	2–5	Bibee (2–1)	Crawford (1–3)	Clase (20)	Progressive Field	19,444	31–31	L1
63	June 8	@ Guardians	3–10	Civale (2–1)	Dermody (0–1)	—	Progressive Field	21,473	31–32	L2
64	June 9	@ Yankees	3–2	Whitlock (3–2)	Cole (7–1)	Jansen (14)	Yankee Stadium	46,007	32–32	W1
65	June 10	@ Yankees	1–3	Germán (4–3)	Houck (3–6)	Holmes (8)	Yankee Stadium	46,061	32–33	L1
66	June 11	@ Yankees	3–2 (10)	Jansen (2–3)	Marinaccio (2–3)	Martin (1)	Yankee Stadium	46,138	33–33	W1
67	June 12	Rockies	3–4 (10)	Bard (2–0)	Pivetta (3–4)	Carasiti (1)	Fenway Park	32,227	33–34	L1
68	June 13	Rockies	6–7 (10)	Bard (3–0)	Garza (0–1)	Johnson (12)	Fenway Park	31,400	33–35	L2
69	June 14	Rockies	6–3	Whitlock (4–2)	Gomber (4–6)	—	Fenway Park	31,977	34–35	W1
70	June 16	Yankees	15–5	Jacques (1–0)	Germán (4–4)	—	Fenway Park	37,086	35–35	W2
—	June 17	Yankees	Postponed (rain); Makeup: June 18 as part of a split doubleheader							
71	June 18 (1)	Yankees	6–2	Pivetta (4–4)	King (1–3)	—	Fenway Park	36,178	36–35	W3
72	June 18 (2)	Yankees	4–1	Bello (4–4)	Severino (0–2)	Jansen (15)	Fenway Park	36,787	37–35	W4
73	June 19	@ Twins	9–3	Paxton (3–1)	López (3–4)	—	Target Field	22,081	38–35	W5
74	June 20	@ Twins	10–4	Crawford (2–3)	Ober (4–4)	Kluber (1)	Target Field	22,650	39–35	W6
75	June 21	@ Twins	4–5 (10)	Morán (1–2)	Ort (1–1)	—	Target Field	23,912	39–36	L1
76	June 22	@ Twins	0–6	Ryan (8–4)	Garza (0–2)	—	Target Field	28,553	39–37	L2
77	June 23	@ White Sox	3–1	Bello (5–4)	Giolito (5–5)	Jansen (16)	Guaranteed Rate Field	27,015	40–37	W1
78	June 24	@ White Sox	4–5	Graveman (3–3)	Jansen (2–4)	—	Guaranteed Rate Field	33,054	40–38	L1
79	June 25	@ White Sox	1–4	Scholtens (1–2)	Crawford (2–4)	Middleton (2)	Guaranteed Rate Field	26,077	40–39	L2
80	June 27	Marlins	1–10	Alcántara (3–6)	Whitlock (4–3)	—	Fenway Park	35,327	40–40	L3
81	June 28	Marlins	2–6	Garrett (4–2)	Pivetta (4–5)	Puk (12)	Fenway Park	34,261	40–41	L4
82	June 29	Marlins	0–2	Nardi (6–1)	Bello (5–5)	Puk (13)	Fenway Park	36,559	40–42	L5
83	June 30	@ Blue Jays	5–0	Paxton (4–1)	Berríos (8–6)	—	Rogers Centre	37,218	41–42	W1

July: 15–8 (Home: 9–2; Away: 6–6)

#	Date	Opponent	Score	Win	Loss	Save	Stadium	Attendance	Record	Box/ Streak
84	July 1	@ Blue Jays	7–6	Crawford (3–4)	Kikuchi (7–3)	Jansen (17)	Rogers Centre	41,813	42–42	W2
85	July 2	@ Blue Jays	5–4	Martin (2–1)	Romano (3–4)	Jacques (1)	Rogers Centre	41,455	43–42	W3
86	July 4	Rangers	2–6	Dunning (8–1)	Ort (1–2)	Smith (15)	Fenway Park	36,136	43–43	L1
87	July 5	Rangers	4–2	Bello (6–5)	Gray (6–5)	Jansen (18)	Fenway Park	31,568	44–43	W1
88	July 6	Rangers	10–6	Winckowski (3–1)	Sborz (4–4)	—	Fenway Park	33,847	45–43	W2
89	July 7	Athletics	7–3	Pivetta (5–5)	Long (0–1)	—	Fenway Park	31,157	46–43	W3
90	July 8	Athletics	10–3	Paxton (5–1)	Pruitt (1–6)	Walter (1)	Fenway Park	34,087	47–43	W4
91	July 9	Athletics	4–3	Martin (3–1)	Waldichuk (2–6)	Jansen (19)	Fenway Park	35,460	48–43	W5
ASG	July 11	All-Star Game	NL 3–2 AL	Doval (1–0)	Bautista (0–1)	Kimbrel (1)	T-Mobile Park	47,159	—	N/A
92	July 14	@ Cubs	8–3	Bello (7–5)	Hendricks (3–4)	Jansen (20)	Wrigley Field	37,597	49–43	W6
93	July 15	@ Cubs	4–10	Stroman (10–6)	Paxton (5–2)	—	Wrigley Field	40,224	49–44	L1
94	July 16	@ Cubs	11–5	Crawford (4–4)	Steele (9–3)	—	Wrigley Field	37,812	50–44	W1
95	July 17	@ Athletics	7–0	Pivetta (6–5)	Blackburn (1–2)	—	Oakland Coliseum	9,987	51–44	W2
96	July 18	@ Athletics	0–3	Medina (3–7)	Jacques (1–1)	May (7)	Oakland Coliseum	10,115	51–45	L1
97	July 19	@ Athletics	5–6	Felipe (1–0)	Bello (7–6)	May (8)	Oakland Coliseum	15,023	51–46	L2
98	July 21	Mets	4–5	Hartwig (3–1)	Crawford (4–5)	Robertson (14)	Fenway Park	37,035	51–47	L3
99	July 22	Mets	8–6	Paxton (6–2)	Scherzer (8–4)	Jansen (21)	Fenway Park	36,505	52–47	W1
100	July 23	Mets	6–1	Murphy (1–0)	Carrasco (3–4)	—	Fenway Park	35,619	53–47	W2
101	July 25	Braves	7–1	Pivetta (7–5)	Morton (10–8)	—	Fenway Park	36,663	54–47	W3
102	July 26	Braves	5–3	Jacques (2–1)	Johnson (1–6)	Jansen (22)	Fenway Park	37,457	55–47	W4
103	July 28	@ Giants	3–2	Crawford (5–5)	Webb (8–9)	Jansen (23)	Oracle Park	33,755	56–47	W5
104	July 29	@ Giants	2–3	Doval (3–3)	Jansen (2–5)	—	Oracle Park	37,470	56–48	L1
105	July 30	@ Giants	3–4 (11)	Beck (2–0)	Llovera (1–1)	—	Oracle Park	37,026	56–49	L2
106	July 31	@ Mariners	2–6	Brash (6–3)	Pivetta (7–6)	—	T-Mobile Park	32,665	56–50	L3

August: 13–15 (Home: 6–10; Away: 7–5)

#	Date	Opponent	Score	Win	Loss	Save	Stadium	Attendance	Record	Box/ Streak
107	August 1	@ Mariners	6–4	Bello (8–6)	Miller (7–4)	Jansen (24)	T-Mobile Park	28,677	57–50	W1
108	August 2	@ Mariners	3–6	Brash (7–3)	Schreiber (1–1)	Muñoz (3)	T-Mobile Park	37,942	57–51	L1
109	August 4	Blue Jays	3–7	Manoah (3–8)	Paxton (6–3)	Hicks (9)	Fenway Park	36,376	57–52	L2
110	August 5	Blue Jays	4–5	Berríos (9–7)	Bernardino (1–1)	Swanson (4)	Fenway Park	36,732	57–53	L3
111	August 6	Blue Jays	1–13	Bassitt (11–6)	Murphy (1–1)	—	Fenway Park	36,162	57–54	L4
112	August 7	Royals	6–2	Jansen (3–5)	Hernández (1–7)	—	Fenway Park	32,732	58–54	W1
113	August 8	Royals	3–9	Singer (8–8)	Crawford (5–6)	—	Fenway Park	30,997	58–55	L1
114	August 9	Royals	4–3	Pivetta (8–6)	Lyles (3–13)	Jansen (25)	Fenway Park	35,495	59–55	W1
115	August 10	Royals	2–0	Paxton (7–3)	Marsh (0–6)	Jansen (26)	Fenway Park	31,952	60–55	W2
116	August 11	Tigers	5–2	Barraclough (1–0)	Skubal (2–2)	Murphy (1)	Fenway Park	32,647	61–55	W3
117	August 12	Tigers	2–6	Manning (4–4)	Bello (8–7)	Foley (5)	Fenway Park	35,927	61–56	L1
118	August 13	Tigers	6–3	Whitlock (5–3)	Rodríguez (8–6)	Jansen (27)	Fenway Park	35,145	62–56	W1
119	August 15	@ Nationals	5–4	Schreiber (2–1)	Gray (7–10)	Jansen (28)	Nationals Park	23,516	63–56	W2
120	August 16	@ Nationals	2–6	Ferrer (2–0)	Whitlock (5–4)	—	Nationals Park	26,507	63–57	L1
121	August 17	@ Nationals	7–10	Corbin (8–11)	Sale (5–3)	Finnegan (19)	Nationals Park	25,445	63–58	L2
122	August 18	@ Yankees	8–3	Bello (9–7)	Brito (4–6)	—	Yankee Stadium	44,566	64–58	W1
123	August 19	@ Yankees	8–1	Crawford (6–6)	Cole (10–4)	—	Yankee Stadium	42,599	65–58	W2
124	August 20	@ Yankees	6–5	Martin (4–1)	Holmes (4–4)	Jansen (29)	Yankee Stadium	43,946	66–58	W3
125	August 21	@ Astros	4–9	Javier (9–2)	Paxton (7–4)	—	Minute Maid Park	31,590	66–59	L1
126	August 22	@ Astros	3–7	Verlander (9–6)	Houck (3–7)	—	Minute Maid Park	33,042	66–60	L2
127	August 23	@ Astros	7–5 (10)	Pivetta (9–6)	Graveman (3–6)	Winckowski (3)	Minute Maid Park	37,144	67–60	W1
128	August 24	@ Astros	17–1	Bello (10–7)	France (9–5)	—	Minute Maid Park	35,323	68–60	W2
129	August 25	Dodgers	4–7	Lynn (10–9)	Pivetta (9–7)	Phillips (20)	Fenway Park	35,653	68–61	L1
130	August 26	Dodgers	8–5	Bernardino (2–1)	Urías (11–7)	Schreiber (1)	Fenway Park	35,986	69–61	W1
131	August 27	Dodgers	4–7	Stone (1–0)	Houck (3–8)	Phillips (21)	Fenway Park	33,954	69–62	L1
132	August 28	Astros	5–13	Graveman (4–6)	Barraclough (1–1)	Urquidy (1)	Fenway Park	33,771	69–63	L2
133	August 29	Astros	2–6	France (10–5)	Bello (10–8)	—	Fenway Park	30,267	69–64	L3
134	August 30	Astros	4–7	Valdez (10–9)	Crawford (6–7)	Pressly (29)	Fenway Park	31,045	69–65	L4

September / October: 9–19 (Home: 3–9; Away: 6–10)

#	Date	Opponent	Score	Win	Loss	Save	Stadium	Attendance	Record	Box/ Streak
135	September 1	@ Royals	2–13	Lyles (4–15)	Paxton (7–5)	—	Kauffman Stadium	15,470	69–66	L5
136	September 2	@ Royals	9–5	Houck (4–8)	Marsh (0–8)	Pivetta (1)	Kauffman Stadium	20,527	70–66	W1
137	September 3	@ Royals	7–3	Sale (6–3)	Greinke (1–14)	—	Kauffman Stadium	15,785	71–66	W2
138	September 4	@ Rays	7–3	Bello (11–8)	Devenski (3–4)	—	Tropicana Field	18,302	72–66	W3
139	September 5	@ Rays	6–8 (11)	Ramírez (3–3)	Jansen (3–6)	—	Tropicana Field	9,119	72–67	L1
140	September 6	@ Rays	1–3	Glasnow (8–5)	Pivetta (9–8)	Fairbanks (20)	Tropicana Field	10,100	72–68	L2
141	September 8	Orioles	2–11	Bradish (11–6)	Houck (4–9)	—	Fenway Park	33,852	72–69	L3
142	September 9	Orioles	12–13	Fujinami (7–8)	Sale (6–4)	—	Fenway Park	34,615	72–70	L4
143	September 10	Orioles	7–3	Bello (12–8)	Rodriguez (5–4)	—	Fenway Park	31,295	73–70	W1
—	September 11	Yankees	Postponed (rain); Makeup: September 12 as part of a split doubleheader							
144	September 12 (1)	Yankees	2–3	Brito (7–7)	Pivetta (9–9)	Holmes (19)	Fenway Park	30,029	73–71	L1
145	September 12 (2)	Yankees	1–4	Rodón (3–5)	Winckowski (3–2)	Ramirez (1)	Fenway Park	30,392	73–72	L2
—	September 13	Yankees	Postponed (rain); Makeup: September 14 as part of a split doubleheader							
146	September 14 (1)	Yankees	5–0	Houck (5–9)	King (4–6)	—	Fenway Park	30,228	74–72	W1
147	September 14 (2)	Yankees	5–8	Peralta (4–2)	Llovera (1–2)	Kahnle (2)	Fenway Park	35,507	74–73	L1
148	September 15	@ Blue Jays	0–3	Berríos (11–10)	Bello (12–9)	Romano (35)	Rogers Centre	35,680	74–74	L2
149	September 16	@ Blue Jays	3–4 (13)	Green (3–0)	Llovera (1–3)	—	Rogers Centre	42,276	74–75	L3
150	September 17	@ Blue Jays	2–3	Swanson (4–2)	Whitlock (5–5)	—	Rogers Centre	41,876	74–76	L4
151	September 18	@ Rangers	4–2	Winckowski (4–2)	Smith (2–7)	Martin (2)	Globe Life Field	27,375	75–76	W1
152	September 19	@ Rangers	4–6	Chapman (6–4)	Murphy (1–2)	Leclerc (3)	Globe Life Field	26,617	75–77	L1
153	September 20	@ Rangers	5–15	Pérez (10–4)	Bello (12–10)	—	Globe Life Field	28,519	75–78	L2
154	September 22	White Sox	3–2	Llovera (2–3)	Crochet (0–2)	Martin (3)	Fenway Park	37,102	76–78	W1
155	September 23	White Sox	0–1	Bummer (5–5)	Winckowski (4–3)	Shaw (3)	Fenway Park	33,392	76–79	L1
156	September 24	White Sox	2–3 (6)	Clevinger (9–8)	Crawford (6–8)	—	Fenway Park	33,399	76–80	L2
157	September 26	Rays	7–9	Eflin (16–8)	Houck (5–10)	Fairbanks (25)	Fenway Park	34,094	76–81	L3
158	September 27	Rays	0–5	Glasnow (10–7)	Bello (12–11)	—	Fenway Park	34,559	76–82	L4
159	September 28	@ Orioles	0–2	Kremer (13–5)	Sale (6–5)	Wells (1)	Camden Yards	27,543	76–83	L5
160	September 29	@ Orioles	3–0	Pivetta (10–9)	Means (1–2)	Whitlock (1)	Camden Yards	28,192	77–83	W1
161	September 30	@ Orioles	2–5	Zimmermann (2–0)	Winckowski (4–4)	—	Camden Yards	43,150	77–84	L1
162	October 1	@ Orioles	6–1	Houck (6–10)	Coulombe (5–3)	—	Camden Yards	36,640	78–84	W1

=== Grand slams ===
No.	Date	Red Sox batter	H/A	Pitcher	Opposing team	Ref.
1	April 8	Rafael Devers	Away	Garrett Hill	Detroit Tigers	
2	April 23	Masataka Yoshida	Away	Javy Guerra	Milwaukee Brewers	
3	April 25	Jarren Duran	Away	Kyle Bradish	Baltimore Orioles	
4	June 16	Justin Turner	Home	Matt Krook	New York Yankees	
5	July 16	Masataka Yoshida	Away	Justin Steele	Chicago Cubs	
6	August 7	Pablo Reyes	Home	Carlos Hernández	Kansas City Royals	
7	August 17	Luis Urías	Away	Robert Garcia	Washington Nationals	
8	August 19	Luis Urías	Away	Gerrit Cole	New York Yankees	

=== Ejections ===
No.	Date	Red Sox personnel	H/A	Opposing team	Ref.
1	April 24	Peter Fatse	Away	Baltimore Orioles	
2	April 24	Alex Cora	Away	Baltimore Orioles	
3	May 6	Kutter Crawford†	Away	Philadelphia Phillies	
4	June 5	Alex Cora	Home	Tampa Bay Rays	
5	August 20	Alex Cora	Away	New York Yankees	
6	August 22	Alex Verdugo	Away	Houston Astros	
7	August 22	Alex Cora	Away	Houston Astros	

† Crawford was on the injured list at the time of his ejection, which resulted from a pre-game staring contest with Matt Strahm of the Phillies, who was also ejected.

== Roster ==
2023 Boston Red Sox
Roster
Pitchers: 44 Kyle Barraclough; 66 Brayan Bello; 83 Brennan Bernardino; 35 Richard Bleier; 70 Ryan Brasier; 50 Kutter Crawford; 62 Matt Dermody; 32 Jake Faria; 63 Justin Garza; 89 Tanner Houck; 78 Joe Jacques; 74 Kenley Jansen; 76 Zack Kelly; 28 Corey Kluber; 32 Dinelson Lamet; 52 Zack Littell; 68 Mauricio Llovera; 55 Chris Martin; 72 Chris Murphy; 61 Kaleb Ort; 65 James Paxton; 37 Nick Pivetta; 73 Nick Robertson; 57 Joely Rodríguez; 41 Chris Sale; 46 John Schreiber; 67 Tayler Scott; 71 Ryan Sherriff; 75 Brandon Walter; 56 Zack Weiss; 22 Garrett Whitlock; 25 Josh Winckowski	Catchers: 38 Jorge Alfaro; 77 Caleb Hamilton; 3 Reese McGuire; 12 Connor Wong; Infielders: 39 Christian Arroyo; 36 Triston Casas; 20 Yu Chang; 29 Bobby Dalbec; 11 Rafael Devers; 70 David Hamilton; 5 Kiké Hernández; 19 Pablo Reyes; 10 Trevor Story; 2 Justin Turner; 17 Luis Urías; 47 Enmanuel Valdez	Outfielders: 52 Wilyer Abreu; 16 Jarren Duran; 18 Adam Duvall; 43 Ceddanne Rafaela; 30 Rob Refsnyder; 17 Raimel Tapia; 99 Alex Verdugo; 7 Masataka Yoshida	Manager: 13 Alex Cora; Coaches: 58 Dave Bush (pitching); 62 Peter Fatse (hitting); 53 Carlos Febles (third base); 81 Andy Fox (field coordinator); 84 Kyle Hudson (first base/outfield); 90 Charlie Madden (bullpen catcher); 88 Mani Martinez (bullpen catcher); 54 Luis Ortiz (assistant hitting); 85 Ben Rosenthal (assistant hitting); 33 Jason Varitek (game planning/catching); 60 Ramón Vázquez (bench); 51 Kevin Walker (bullpen)

=== MLB debuts ===
Red Sox players who made their MLB debuts during the 2023 regular season:

- March 30: Masataka Yoshida
- April 19: Enmanuel Valdez
- June 7: Chris Murphy
- June 12: Joe Jacques
- June 21: David Hamilton
- June 22: Brandon Walter
- August 22: Wilyer Abreu
- August 28: Ceddanne Rafaela

== Player statistics ==
= Indicates team leader

=== Batting ===
Note: G = Games played; AB = At bats; R = Runs; H = Hits; 2B = Doubles; 3B = Triples; HR = Home runs; RBI = Runs batted in; SB = Stolen bases; BB = Walks; AVG = Batting average; SLG = Slugging average

Player	G	AB	R	H	2B	3B	HR	RBI	SB	BB	AVG	SLG
Rafael Devers	153	580	90	157	34	0	33	100	5	62	.271	.500
Justin Turner	146	558	86	154	31	0	23	96	4	51	.276	.455
Alex Verdugo	142	546	81	144	37	5	13	54	5	45	.264	.421
Masataka Yoshida	140	537	71	155	33	3	15	72	8	34	.289	.445
Triston Casas	132	429	66	113	21	2	24	65	0	70	.263	.490
Connor Wong	126	371	55	87	25	2	9	36	8	22	.235	.385
Jarren Duran	102	332	46	98	34	2	8	40	24	24	.295	.482
Adam Duvall	92	320	45	79	24	2	21	58	4	22	.247	.531
Enrique Hernández	86	297	38	66	11	0	6	31	3	22	.222	.320
Rob Refsnyder	89	202	31	50	9	1	1	28	7	33	.248	.317
Christian Arroyo	66	195	23	47	16	0	3	24	1	7	.241	.369
Reese McGuire	72	187	15	50	12	1	1	16	2	11	.267	.358
Pablo Reyes	64	167	27	48	9	0	2	20	7	14	.287	.377
Trevor Story	43	158	12	32	9	0	3	14	10	9	.203	.316
Enmanuel Valdez	49	139	17	37	8	0	6	19	5	8	.266	.453
Yu Chang	39	105	12	17	2	0	6	18	4	3	.162	.352
Luis Urías	32	89	13	20	4	0	2	13	0	14	.225	.337
Raimel Tapia	39	87	14	23	4	1	1	10	6	9	.264	.368
Ceddanne Rafaela	28	83	11	20	6	0	2	5	3	4	.241	.386
Wilyer Abreu	28	76	10	24	6	0	2	14	3	9	.316	.474
Bobby Dalbec	21	49	6	10	2	0	1	1	1	4	.204	.306
David Hamilton	15	33	2	4	2	0	0	0	2	6	.121	.182
Jorge Alfaro	8	17	0	2	0	0	0	0	0	2	.118	.118
Caleb Hamilton	4	5	0	0	0	0	0	0	0	1	.000	.000
Totals	162	5562	772	1437	339	19	182	734	112	486	.258	.424
Rank in AL	—	3	6	3	1	10	10	6	7	12	4	6

Source:Baseball Reference

=== Pitching ===
Note: W = Wins; L = Losses; ERA = Earned run average; G = Games pitched; GS = Games started; SV = Saves; IP = Innings pitched; H = Hits allowed; R = Runs allowed; ER = Earned runs allowed; BB = Walks allowed; SO = Strikeouts

Player	W	L	*ERA	G	GS	SV	IP	H	R	ER	BB	SO
Brayan Bello	12	11	4.24	28	28	0	157.0	165	77	74	45	132
Nick Pivetta	10	9	4.04	38	16	1	142.2	110	69	64	50	183
Kutter Crawford	6	8	4.04	31	23	0	129.1	107	59	58	36	135
Tanner Houck	6	10	5.01	21	21	0	106.0	104	61	59	41	99
Chris Sale	6	5	4.30	20	20	0	102.2	87	52	49	29	125
James Paxton	7	5	4.50	19	19	0	96.0	93	51	48	33	101
Josh Winckowski	4	4	2.88	60	1	3	84.1	89	34	27	31	82
Garrett Whitlock	5	5	5.15	22	10	1	71.2	82	43	41	13	72
Corey Kluber	3	6	7.04	15	9	1	55.0	69	47	43	21	42
Chris Martin	4	1	1.05	55	0	3	51.1	45	6	6	8	46
Brennan Bernardino	2	1	3.20	55	6	0	50.2	48	19	18	18	58
Chris Murphy	1	2	4.91	20	0	1	47.2	50	27	26	17	49
John Schreiber	2	1	3.86	46	2	1	46.2	41	22	20	25	53
Kenley Jansen	3	6	3.63	51	0	29	44.2	40	21	18	17	52
Richard Bleier	1	0	5.28	27	0	0	30.2	37	20	18	5	16
Mauricio Llovera	1	3	5.46	25	0	0	29.2	32	24	18	13	24
Joe Jacques	2	1	5.06	23	1	1	26.2	32	17	15	10	20
Kaleb Ort	1	2	6.26	21	2	0	23.0	27	19	16	9	24
Brandon Walter	0	0	6.26	9	0	1	23.0	32	17	16	7	16
Ryan Brasier	1	0	7.29	20	0	1	21.0	24	18	17	9	18
Justin Garza	0	2	7.36	17	1	0	18.1	22	17	15	12	17
Nick Robertson	0	0	6.00	9	1	0	12.0	13	9	8	5	13
Joely Rodríguez	0	0	6.55	11	0	0	11.0	13	9	8	6	14
Zack Kelly	0	0	3.86	8	0	0	9.1	7	4	4	8	6
Zack Weiss	0	0	2.08	6	0	0	8.2	3	3	2	4	8
Kyle Barraclough	1	1	12.91	3	0	0	7.2	14	11	11	6	4
Ryan Sherriff	0	0	2.70	5	0	0	6.2	6	2	2	2	5
Matt Dermody	0	1	6.75	1	1	0	4.0	4	3	3	1	1
Tayler Scott	0	0	4.91	4	1	0	3.2	6	3	2	4	2
Zack Littell	0	0	9.00	2	0	0	3.0	3	3	3	3	2
Jake Faria	0	0	22.50	1	0	0	2.0	4	5	5	4	3
Dinelson Lamet	0	0	13.50	1	0	0	2.0	4	3	3	1	1
Pablo Reyes	0	0	4.50	2	0	0	2.0	3	1	1	4	0
Totals	78	84	4.52	162	162	43	1430.0	1416	776	718	497	1423
Rank in AL	9	6	11	—	—	7	13	13	11	11	8	10

- Note: No pitchers qualified for league ERA title because of no pitchers averaging 1 IP per game (162 IP).

Source:Baseball Reference

=== Transactions ===
Notable transactions of/for players on the 40-man roster during the 2023 regular season:

- On April 16, the team claimed pitcher Brennan Bernardino off waivers from the Seattle Mariners; in a corresponding move, Zack Kelly was transferred to the 60-day injured list.
- On April 17, pitcher Jake Faria was designated for assignment when the team activated Brayan Bello from the injured list. Faria was later sent outright to the Worcester Red Sox.
- On April 28, the team claimed pitcher Justin Garza off waivers from the Los Angeles Angels.
- On May 5, the team acquired minor-league pitcher Zack Littell from the Texas Rangers for cash considerations; he was added to Boston's active roster the following day. He was designated for assignment on May 10, and subsequently claimed by the Tampa Bay Rays.
- On May 12, the team acquired minor-league utility player Pablo Reyes from the Oakland Athletics for cash considerations; the following day, his contract was selected to the active roster.
- On May 15, the team designated pitcher Ryan Brasier for assignment. The following day, the team selected the contract of Ryan Sherriff, who had been pitching for Worcester, to the active roster. Brasier was released on May 21.
- On June 5, outfielder Raimel Tapia was designated for assignment, as the team cleared roster space to activate Christian Arroyo from the injured list. Tapia was released by the team on June 11.
- On June 8, the team added Worcester pitcher Matt Dermody to the 40-man and active rosters in order to make a start against the Cleveland Guardians; he was designated for assignment after the game. Dermody was sent outright to Worcester on June 11, and released on June 16.
- On June 9, the team added Worcester pitcher Joe Jacques to the 40-man and active rosters.
- On June 22, the team added backup catcher Caleb Hamilton to the 40-man and active rosters; in a corresponding move, Yu Chang was place on the 60-day injured list.
- On July 6, the team signed catcher Jorge Alfaro to a major-league contract; in a corresponding move, Caleb Hamilton was designated for assignment. Hamilton was later sent outright to Worcester.
- On July 7, Ryan Sherriff was designated for assignment. He later elected to become a free agent rather than accepting a minor-league assignment.
- On July 16, the team re-added Jake Faria to the 40-man and active rosters; in a corresponding move, Tayler Scott was designated for assignment. Faria was designated for assignment the following day. Scott was subsequently claimed off waivers by Oakland, while Faria cleared waivers and was sent outright to Worcester.
- On July 25, the team traded Kiké Hernández to the Los Angeles Dodgers for minor-league pitchers Nick Robertson and Justin Hagenman.
- On July 26, the team acquired relief pitcher Mauricio Llovera from the San Francisco Giants for minor-league pitcher Marques Johnson.
- On August 1, the day of the MLB trade deadline, the team acquired infielder Luis Urías from the Milwaukee Brewers in exchange for minor-league pitcher Bradley Blalock. Also, the team designated catcher Jorge Alfaro for assignment. Alfaro later elected to become a free agent.
- On August 4, the team designated Christian Arroyo for assignment. He was later sent outright to Worcester.
- On August 7, the team added pitcher Dinelson Lamet to the 40-man and active rosters; in a corresponding move, pitcher Richard Bleier was designated for assignment. Bleier was released two days later.
- On August 8, Yu Chang was designated for assignment upon the return of Trevor Story from the 60-day injured list. Chang later accepted an assignment to Worcester.
- On August 9, Dinelson Lamet was designated for assignment, and the team added Kyle Barraclough to the active and 40-man rosters. Lamet was later sent outright to Worcester.
- On August 25, the team claimed pitcher Zack Weiss off waivers from the Los Angeles Angels.
- On September 4, the team claimed pitcher Logan Gillaspie off waivers from the Baltimore Orioles.
- On September 24, the team designated Kyle Barraclough for assignment to make roster room for Zack Kelly being activated from the 60-day injured list. Barraclough was later sent outright to Worcester.

=== Amateur draft ===
Boston had the 14th overall selection in the 2023 MLB draft, held July 9–11. The draft consisted of a total of 614 selections over 20 rounds. The Red Sox had a total of 22 picks; one in each round, plus two compensatory picks made during the fourth round. The team's picks during the first five rounds were:

Round	Pick	Player	Position	B/T	Class	School (sorts by state)	Signing date
1	14	Kyle Teel	C	L/R	4YR Jr.	Virginia	July 21
2	50	Nazzan Zanetello	SS	R/R	HS Sr.	Christian Brothers College HS (MO)	July 22
3	83	Antonio Anderson	SS	S/R	HS Sr.	North Atlanta HS (GA)	July 22
4	115	Matt Duffy	P	L/R	4YR Jr.	Canisius	July 21
4†	132	Kristian Campbell	SS	R/R	4YR So.	Georgia Tech	July 21
4†	133	Justin Riemer	SS	S/R	4YR Jr.	Wright State	July 25
5	151	Connelly Early	P	L/L	4YR Jr.	Virginia	July 21

† Compensatory round selection

== Awards and honors ==
Recipient	Award	Date awarded	Ref.
Adam Duvall	AL Player of the Week (March 30–April 2)	April 3, 2023	
Masataka Yoshida	AL Player of the Week (May 1–7)	May 8, 2023	
Kenley Jansen	All-Star Reserve P	July 2, 2023	
James Paxton	AL Pitcher of the Month (June)	July 3, 2023	
Triston Casas	AL Rookie of the Month (July)	August 2, 2023	
Adam Duvall	AL Player of the Week (August 21–27)	August 28, 2023	
Rafael Devers	AL Player of the Week (September 11–17)	September 18, 2023	
Rafael Devers	AL Silver Slugger Award 3B	November 9, 2023	

Triston Casas was a finalist for a Silver Slugger Award. He was also named a finalist for the American League Rookie of the Year Award, which went to Gunnar Henderson of the Orioles.

Devers, Justin Turner, and pitcher Chris Martin were nominated for the All-MLB Team, with winners due to be announced on December 16.

== Farm system ==
Luke Montz, who managed the Salem Red Sox during the 2021 and 2022 seasons, left the Red Sox organization in October 2022. The team announced US-based minor-league staff assignments on January 27.

Level	Team	League	Division	Manager	Record (Note: Overall records for the entire season are presented—some minor leagues play a split season, with first-half and second-half results determining playoff participants.)
Triple-A	Worcester Red Sox	International League	East	Chad Tracy	79–68 (.537)
Double-A	Portland Sea Dogs	Eastern League	Northeast	Chad Epperson	73–63 (.537)
High-A	Greenville Drive	South Atlantic League	South	Iggy Suarez	63–69 (.477)
Single-A	Salem Red Sox	Carolina League	North	Liam Carroll	55–72 (.433)
Rookie	FCL Red Sox	Florida Complex League	South	Jimmy Gonzalez; Tom Kotchman	28–25 (.528)
Rookie	DSL Red Sox Blue	Dominican; Summer League	San Pedro		28–26 (.519)
Rookie	DSL Red Sox Red	Dominican; Summer League	San Pedro		26–26 (.500)
