= Enmanuel Valdez =

Dominican baseball player (born 1998)

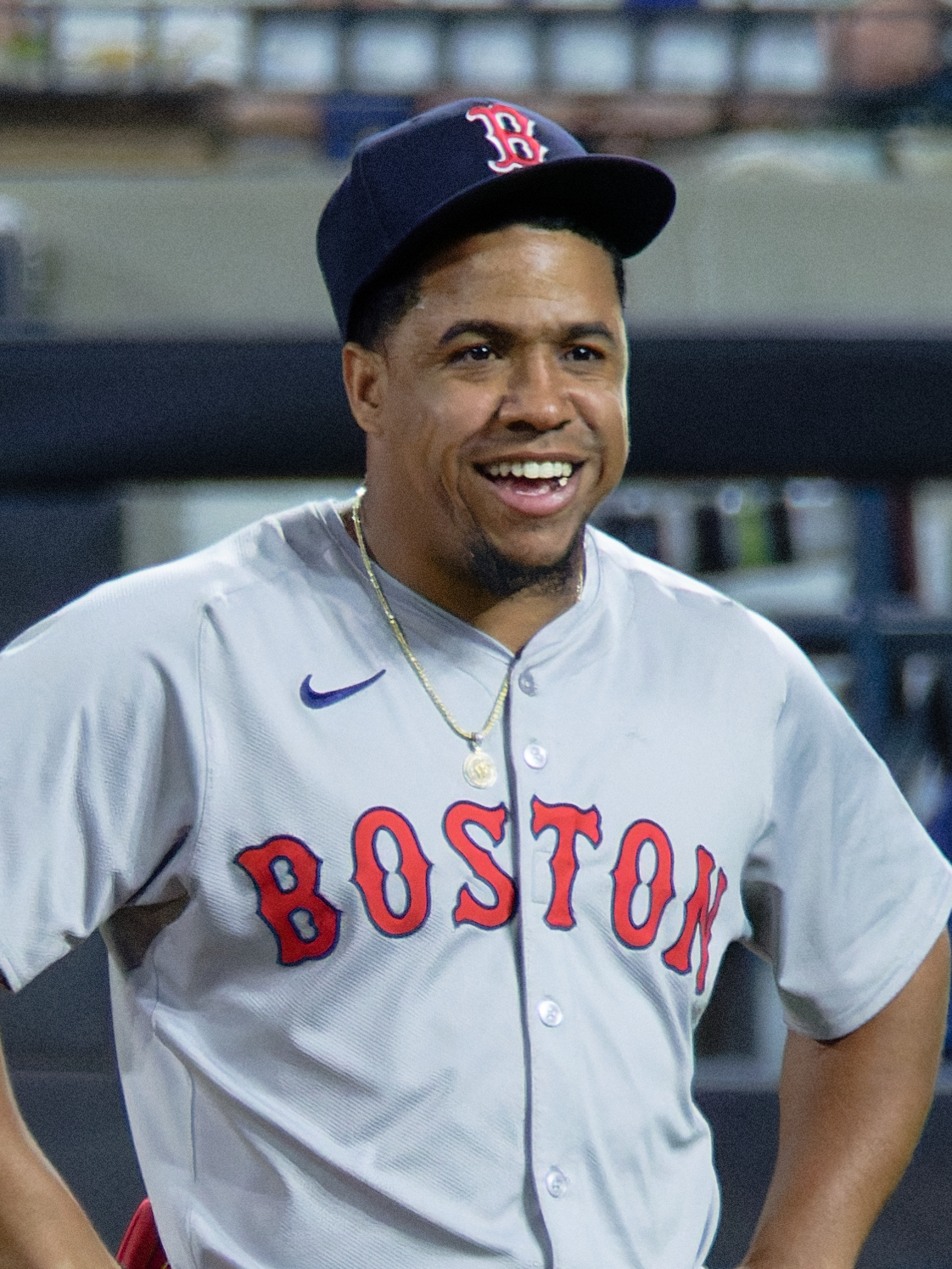
- Valdez with the Red Sox in 2024

Free agent
- Second baseman / First baseman
- Born: December 28, 1998 (age 27); San Juan de la Maguana, Dominican Republic
- Bats: Left Throws: Right

MLB debut
- April 19, 2023, for the Boston Red Sox

MLB statistics (through 2025 season)
- Batting average: .230
- Home runs: 14
- Runs batted in: 59
- Stats at Baseball Reference

Teams
- Boston Red Sox (2023–2024); Pittsburgh Pirates (2025)

Enmanuel Valdez (born December 28, 1998) is a Dominican professional baseball second baseman and first baseman who is a free agent. He has previously played in Major League Baseball (MLB) for the Boston Red Sox, with whom he made his MLB debut with in 2023 and the Pittsburgh Pirates.

== Career ==
=== Houston Astros ===
Valdez signed with the Houston Astros as an international free agent on July 2, 2015. He made his professional debut in 2016 with the Dominican Summer League Astros. He played 2017 with the Gulf Coast League Astros and Greeneville Astros, 2018 with the Tri-City ValleyCats, and 2019 with the Quad Cities River Bandits and Fayetteville Woodpeckers.

Valdez did not play in 2020 due to cancellation of the minor league season because of the COVID-19 pandemic. He returned in 2021 to play for the Asheville Tourists and Corpus Christi Hooks. He started 2022 in Double-A with Corpus Christi. and was later promoted to the Sugar Land Space Cowboys of Triple-A.

=== Boston Red Sox ===
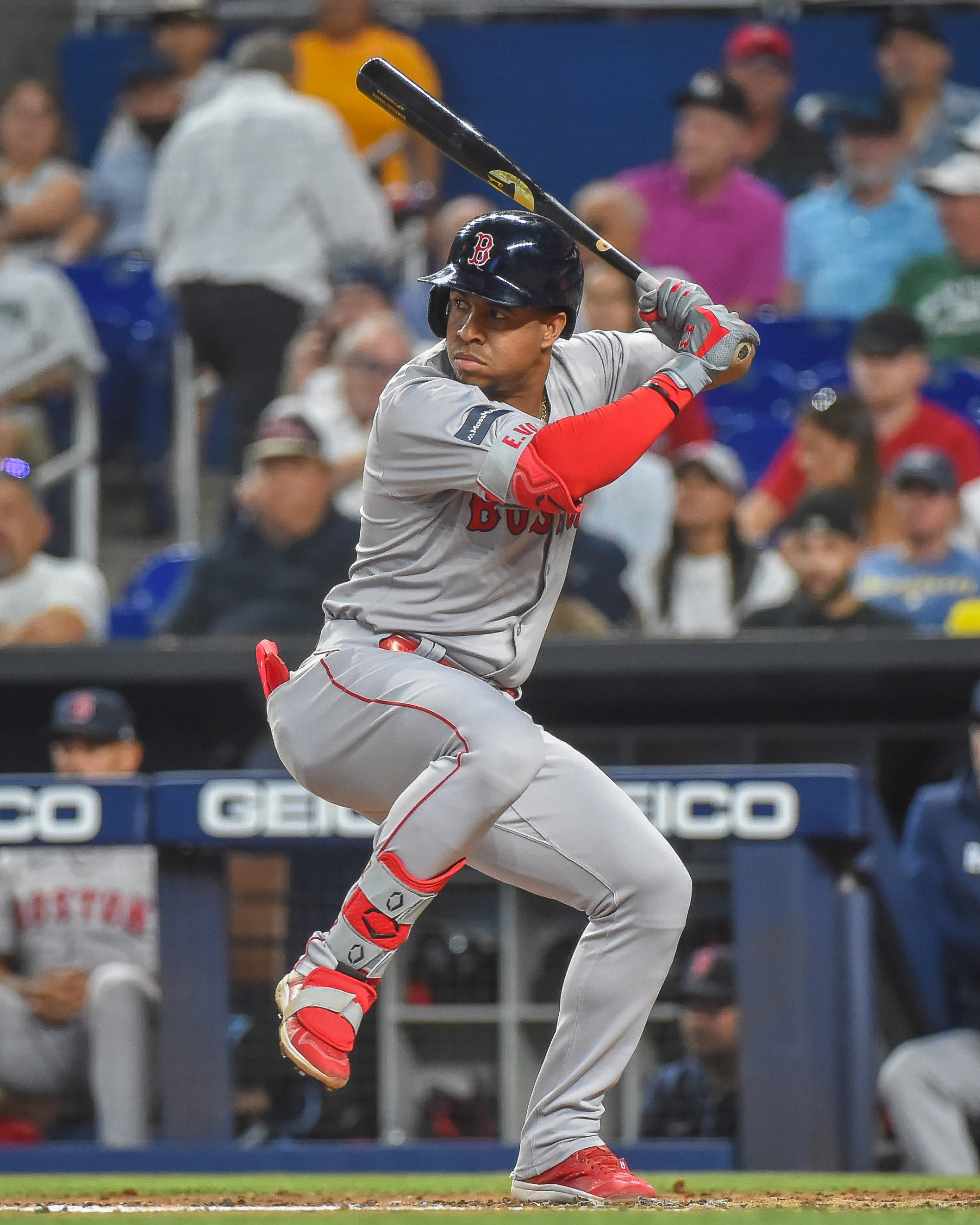
Valdez with the Red Sox in 2024

On August 1, 2022, Valdez and Wilyer Abreu were traded to the Boston Red Sox in exchange for Christian Vázquez. Valdez finished the season with the Triple-A Worcester Red Sox.

On November 10, 2022, the Red Sox added Valdez to their 40-man roster to protect him from the Rule 5 draft. During the offseason, he played in the Dominican Winter League for Toros del Este. He was optioned to Worcester to begin the 2023 season.

On April 19, 2023, Valdez was promoted to the major leagues for the first time after Yu Chang was placed on the paternity list. Valdez made his MLB debut that evening, against the Minnesota Twins, and recorded two hits. He was optioned back to Worcester the next day, then recalled on April 25 when Chang went on the injured list due to a hand injury. Valdez remained with the Red Sox until being optioned back to Worcester on June 9. He was recalled to Boston on September 1, when major-league rosters expanded to 28 players, optioned back on September 12, and recalled again on September 22.

Valdez made 76 appearances for Boston in 2024, slashing .214/.270/.363 with six home runs and 28 RBI. On December 11, 2024, Valdez was designated for assignment by the Red Sox.

=== Pittsburgh Pirates ===
On December 15, 2024, Valdez was traded to the Pittsburgh Pirates in exchange for Joe Vogatsky. He was optioned to the Triple-A Indianapolis Indians to begin the 2025 season. In 31 appearances for Pittsburgh, Valdez slashed .209/.294/.363 with two home runs and 12 RBI. On May 10, 2025, Valdez was placed on the injured list with left shoulder inflammation. He was transferred to the 60-day injured list on May 14. On May 21, it was announced that Valdez had undergone season-ending surgery.

Valdez was again optioned to Triple-A Indianapolis to begin the 2026 season. On April 3, 2026, Valdez was designated for assignment by the Pirates following the promotion of Konnor Griffin. He cleared waivers and was sent outright to Indianapolis on April 8. In 118 games with Triple-A Indianapolis Indians he batted .254/.328/.448 with 18 home runs, 76 RBIs and one stolen base. He elected free agency on November 2.
