= Brennan Bernardino =

Mexican-American baseball player (born 1992)

- Bernardino with the Boston Red Sox in 2024

Colorado Rockies – No. 83
- Pitcher
- Born: January 15, 1992 (age 34); Valencia, California, U.S.
- Bats: Left Throws: Left

MLB debut
- July 31, 2022, for the Seattle Mariners

MLB statistics (through 2026 season)
- Win–loss record: 14–11
- Earned run average: 3.28
- Strikeouts: 206
- Stats at Baseball Reference

Teams
- Seattle Mariners (2022); Boston Red Sox (2023–2025); Colorado Rockies (2026–present)
Medals
Men's baseball
Representing Mexico
WBSC Premier12
| Bronze medal – third place | 2019 Tokyo | National team |

Brennan Allen Bernardino (born January 15, 1992) is an American professional baseball pitcher for the Colorado Rockies of Major League Baseball (MLB). He has previously played in MLB for the Seattle Mariners and Boston Red Sox.

== Amateur career ==
Bernardino attended California State University, Dominguez Hills and played college baseball for the Cal State Dominguez Hills Toros. During his time there, he was teammates with pitcher Bubby Rossman, who made his major-league debut in 2022.

== Professional career ==
=== Cincinnati Reds ===
Bernardino was selected by the Cincinnati Reds in the 26th round of the 2014 MLB draft. In his first professional season, he played for the Rookie–level Billings Mustangs and pitched to a 1–1 win–loss record and a 1.01 earned run average (ERA) in 26 2/3 innings pitched. The next season, he split the season between the Dayton Dragons and the Louisville Bats, finishing the season with a combined 2–3 record and a 3.72 ERA in 55 2/3 innings pitched. In 2016, he played the entire season on the Daytona Tortugas and recorded a 5–3 record and a 3.71 ERA in 60 2/3 innings pitched. He was promoted to the Double-A Pensacola Blue Wahoos in 2017, and went 2–4 with a 4.46 ERA in 40 1/3 innings. In the 2017–18 offseason, he pitched for the Naranjeros de Hermosillo of the Mexican Pacific League, pitching to a 4.26 ERA in 6 1/3 innings pitched. He started the 2018 season with Pensacola, but was released from the Reds organization after accumulating a 6.30 ERA in 20 innings pitched.

=== Winnipeg Goldeyes ===
On August 8, 2018, Bernardino signed with the Winnipeg Goldeyes. He started five out of the six games he pitched for them, and went 2–3 with a 3.18 ERA in 34 innings pitched.

=== Toros de Tijuana ===
On May 24, 2019, Bernardino signed with the Toros de Tijuana of the Mexican League. He registered a 2.94 ERA in 33 2/3 innings pitched across 33 appearances.

=== Cleveland Indians ===
After his stint with Tijuana, Bernardino's contract was purchased by the Cleveland Indians. He pitched for the Lynchburg Hillcats and Akron RubberDucks and recorded a cumulative 1–1 record and a 4.76 ERA in 11 1/3 innings pitched. He did not play a minor-league game in 2020 as the season was cancelled due to the COVID-19 pandemic.

=== Toros de Tijuana (second stint) ===
In 2021, Bernardino signed with the Toros de Tijuana for a second stint with the team. He spent the entire 2021 season with Tijuana and pitched to a 0–1 record and a 5.63 ERA in 24 innings pitched. During the 2022 season, in nine starts for Tijuana he recorded a 3.07 ERA in 44 innings pitched.

=== Seattle Mariners ===
On June 25, 2022, Bernardino had his contract purchased by the Seattle Mariners. He was assigned to the Triple-A Tacoma Rainiers and pitched to a 2–0 record and a 0.79 ERA in 11 1/3 innings pitched. On July 30, 2022, Bernardino's contract was selected to the major-league roster. He made in MLB debut the next day, coming on in the 10th inning and taking the loss after Houston Astros designated hitter Yordan Alvarez hit a single to drive in a run. Bernardino made two appearances for the major-league club in 2022, logging a 3.86 ERA with no strikeouts in 2 1/3 innings pitched.

Bernardino was optioned to Triple-A Tacoma to begin the 2023 season. He surrendered eight runs in six innings pitched across two appearances for Tacoma before he was designated for assignment on April 11, 2023.

=== Boston Red Sox ===
On April 16, 2023, Bernardino was claimed off waivers by the Boston Red Sox and was optioned to the Triple-A Worcester Red Sox. On April 24, Bernardino was added to Boston's active roster. He was briefly sent back to Worcester for a week in mid-May, and a week in late May. In late August, Bernardino was on the COVID-related injured list for a week. In 55 appearances for Boston, he logged a 3.20 ERA with 58 strikeouts across 50 2/3 innings pitched.

Bernardino was optioned to Triple–A Worcester to begin the 2024 season. He was recalled to Boston on April 9, after Nick Pivetta was placed on the injured list. In 57 appearances (3 starts) for Boston, Bernardino posted a 4.06 ERA and 56 strikeouts across 51 innings pitched.

Bernardino made 55 appearances (three starts) for the Red Sox during the 2025 campaign, compiling a 4-3 record and 3.14 ERA with 43 strikeouts and one save across 51 2/3 innings pitched.

=== Colorado Rockies ===
On November 18, 2025, the Red Sox traded Bernardino to the Colorado Rockies in exchange for outfielder Braiden Ward.

== International career ==
Bernardino has pitched in winter league baseball several times: Naranjeros de Hermosillo of the Mexican Pacific League (LMP) during the 2017–18 offseason, Tigres de Aragua of the Venezuelan Professional Baseball League in the 2018–19 offseason, and Charros de Jalisco of LMP during the 2019–20 through the 2022–23 offseason. Jalisco advanced to the Caribbean Series, representing Mexico, in the 2021–22 offseason. Bernardino was a member of the Mexico national baseball team for the WBSC Premier12 tournaments of 2015 and 2019.

== Personal life ==
Bernardino is of Samoan and Mexican descent. He holds dual American and Mexican citizenship. He is married to LaCandace Dandridge and they have a son named Jaylen. The couple was set to get married on November 28, 2020, in Gilbert, Arizona but the wedding was postponed to a later date due to COVID-19 Pandemic. After previously maintaining an apartment in San Diego, they decided to stay in Boston during the 2023–24 offseason.

Bernardino's sister Lelani played softball at the University of Memphis and earned 2009 All-Conference USA Freshman Team and 2010 Second Team All-Conference USA honors.
