= Caleb Hamilton =

American baseball player (born 1995)

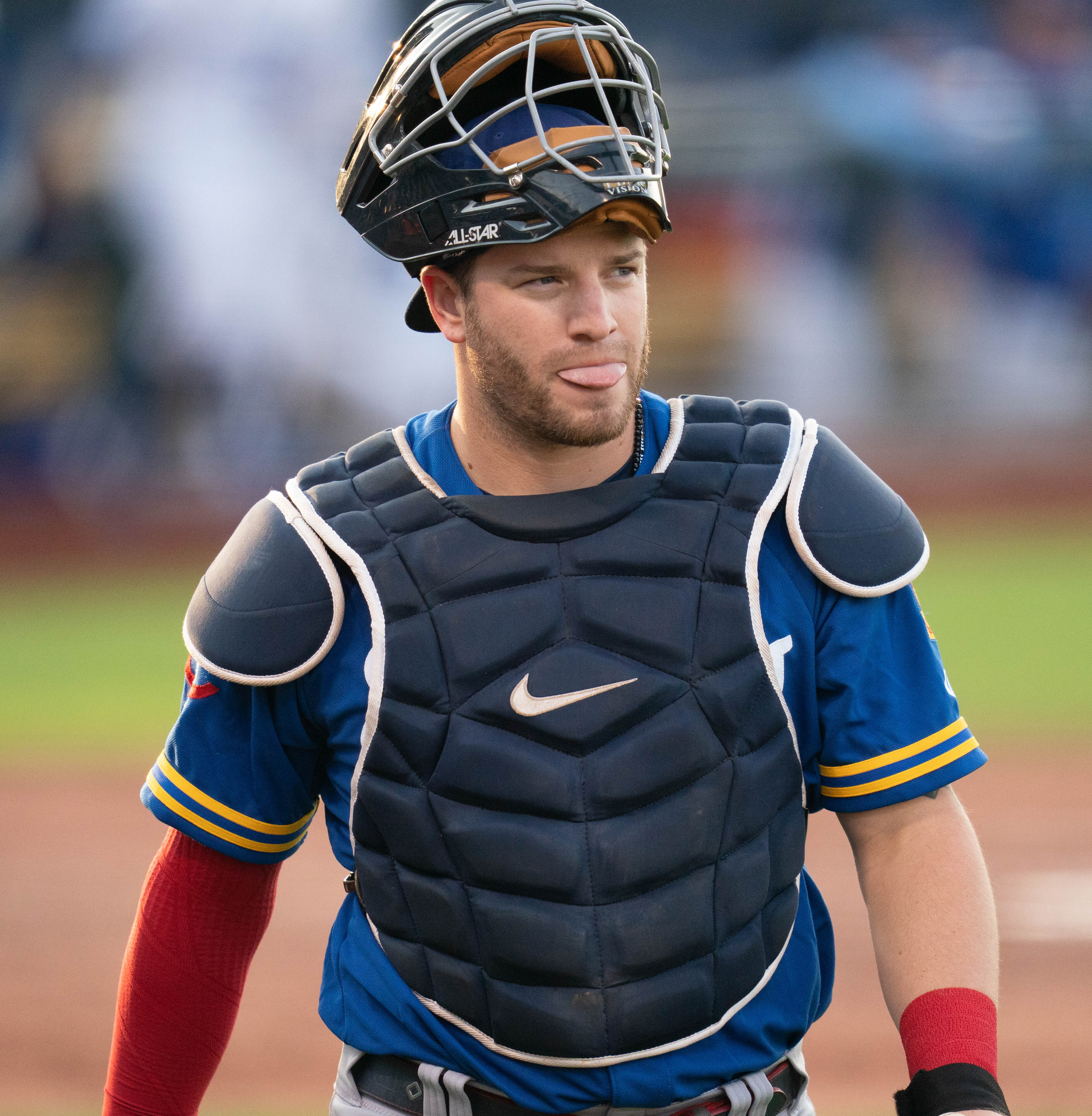
- Hamilton with the St. Paul Saints in 2022
- Catcher
- Born: February 5, 1995 (age 31); Woodinville, Washington, U.S.
- Batted: Right Threw: Right

MLB debut
- July 17, 2022, for the Minnesota Twins

Last MLB appearance
- July 1, 2023, for the Boston Red Sox

MLB statistics
- Batting average: .043
- Home runs: 1
- Runs batted in: 1
- Stats at Baseball Reference

Teams
- Minnesota Twins (2022); Boston Red Sox (2023)

Caleb Broderick Hamilton (born February 5, 1995) is an American former professional baseball catcher. He played in Major League Baseball (MLB) for the Minnesota Twins and Boston Red Sox.

== Amateur career ==
A native of Woodinville, Washington, Hamilton graduated from Woodinville High School, then attended Oregon State University where he played college baseball for the Oregon State Beavers from 2014 to 2016. Hamilton had a .223 batting average with six home runs and 53 runs batted in (RBIs) in 149 games for Oregon State. In 2015, he played collegiate summer baseball with the Falmouth Commodores of the Cape Cod Baseball League, batting .193 in 28 games.

== Professional career ==
=== Minnesota Twins ===
Hamilton was selected by the Minnesota Twins in the 23rd round of the 2016 MLB draft. He made his professional debut that season and advanced through the Twins' farm system, first reaching the Triple-A level in 2019. After the 2020 minor-league season was canceled, Hamilton spent 2021 with the Wichita Wind Surge of Double-A and the St. Paul Saints of Triple-A, registering an overall .224 batting average with seven home runs and 42 RBIs in 99 games.

In 2022, Hamilton returned to St. Paul to start the season, then was called up by the Twins and made his MLB debut on July 17. After going 0–for–12 to begin his career, he recorded his first career hit on September 25, a solo shot off of José Quijada of the Los Angeles Angels. In 22 major-league games with Minnesota, he batted .056 with his only hit in 18 at bats being a home run. He also appeared in 62 games with St. Paul, batting .233 with 11 home runs and 43 RBIs.

=== Boston Red Sox ===
On October 11, 2022, Hamilton was claimed off waivers by the Boston Red Sox. On November 15, he was designated for assignment. He cleared waivers and was sent outright to the Triple–A Worcester Red Sox on November 21.

Hamilton began the 2023 season in Worcester, playing in 30 games and hitting just .180 with 3 home runs and 13 RBI until he was selected to Boston's major-league roster on June 22 following an injury to Reese McGuire. In four games for Boston, he went 0–for–5 with a walk. On July 6, Hamilton was designated for assignment following the signing of Jorge Alfaro. Hamilton was sent outright to Worcester on July 9. On October 2, Hamilton elected free agency.

=== Los Angeles Angels ===
On January 31, 2024, Hamilton signed a minor league contract with the Los Angeles Angels. In 38 games for the Double–A Rocket City Trash Pandas, he batted .120/.250/.232 with four home runs, 10 RBI, and three stolen bases. On June 30, Hamilton was released by the Angels organization.

== Coaching career ==
On January 24, 2025, the New York Yankees hired Hamilton to serve as a defensive coach for their High-A affiliate, the Hudson Valley Renegades.

In 2026, Hamilton was named as a defensive coach for the Somerset Patriots the Double-A affiliate of the New York Yankees.
