= Mauricio Llovera =

Venezuelan baseball player (born 1996)

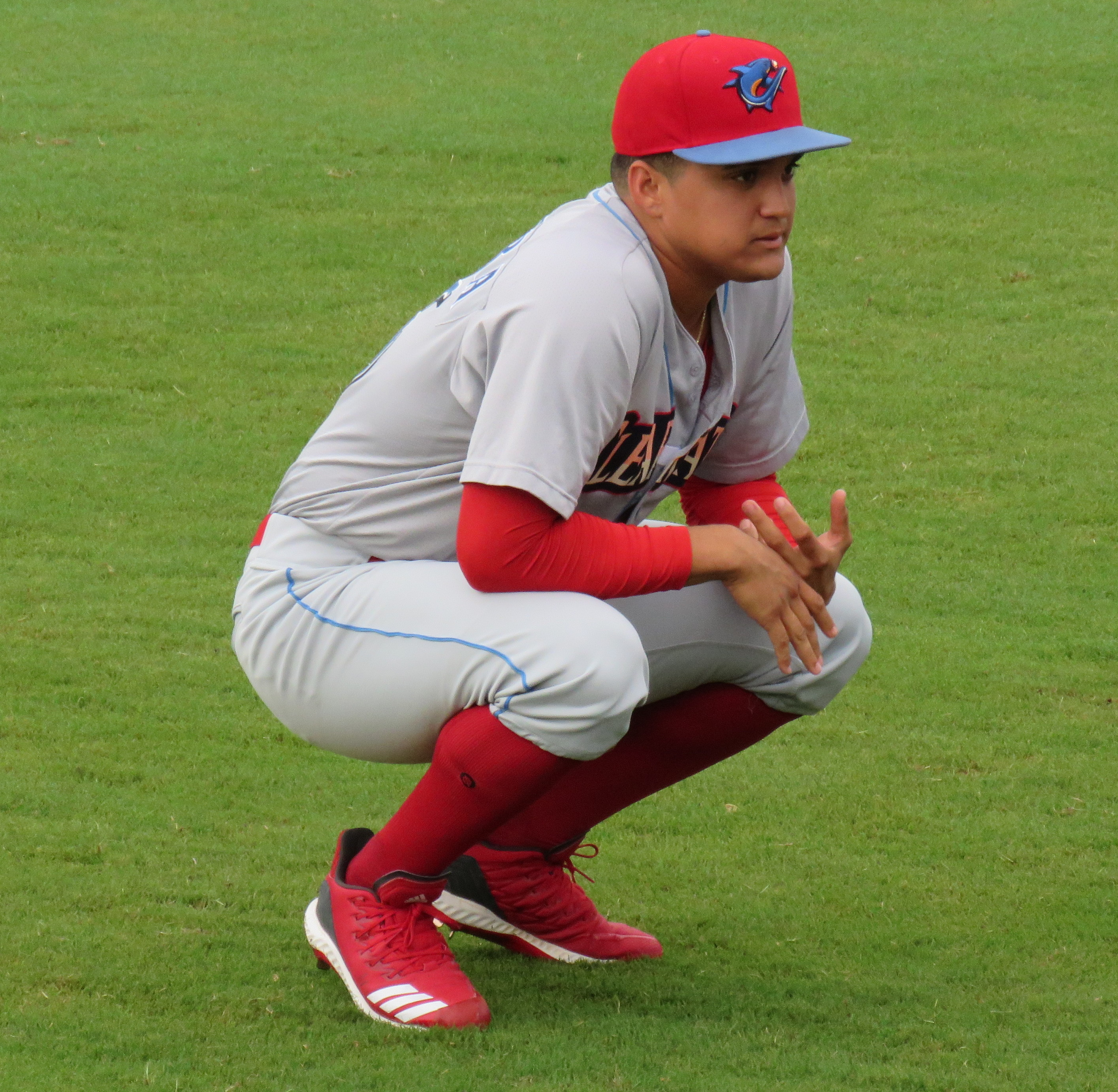
- Llovera with the Clearwater Threshers

Free agent
- Pitcher
- Born: April 17, 1996 (age 29); El Tigre, Venezuela
- Bats: Right Throws: Right

MLB debut
- September 6, 2020, for the Philadelphia Phillies

MLB statistics (through 2023 season)
- Win–loss record: 3–3
- Earned run average: 5.80
- Strikeouts: 57
- Stats at Baseball Reference

Teams
- Philadelphia Phillies (2020–2021); San Francisco Giants (2022–2023); Boston Red Sox (2023)

Mauricio Alejandro Llovera (Note: The 'll' in his surname is pronounced as a 'y' (see yeísmo).) (born April 17, 1996) is a Venezuelan professional baseball pitcher who is a free agent. Llovera signed with the Philadelphia Phillies as an international free agent in 2015, and made his Major League Baseball (MLB) debut with them in 2020. He has also played in MLB for the San Francisco Giants and Boston Red Sox.

== Career ==
=== Philadelphia Phillies ===
Llovera signed with the Philadelphia Phillies as an international free agent on February 12, 2015. He played for the Venezuelan Summer League Phillies in 2015, going 2–4 with a 3.23 earned run average (ERA) over 47 1/3 innings. Llovera spent the 2016 season with the Gulf Coast League Phillies, going 7–1 with a 1.87 ERA over 53 innings.

He played the 2017 season with the Lakewood BlueClaws, going 2–4 with a 3.35 ERA over 86 innings. Llovera spent the 2018 season with the Clearwater Threshers, going 8–7 with a 3.72 ERA over 121 innings, with 137 strikeouts.

He spent the 2019 season with the Reading Fightin Phils, going 3–4 with a 4.55 ERA over 65 1/3 innings. On November 20, 2019, the Phillies added Llovera to their 40–man roster to protect him from the Rule 5 draft. He was promoted to the major leagues for the first time on September 6, 2020, and made his debut that day against the New York Mets.

On August 7, 2021, pitching against the Mets with the Phillies leading 5–0, Llovera became only the second pitcher in baseball history, the other being B.J. Rosenberg, to give up three straight home runs without recording a single out. However, the Phillies won the game 5–3. In 6 games for the Phillies in 2021, Llovera struggled to a 9.45 ERA with 7 strikeouts. On August 20, Llovera was designated for assignment by the Phillies. On August 22, Llovera cleared waivers and was assigned outright to the Triple-A Lehigh Valley IronPigs.

=== San Francisco Giants ===
On December 6, 2021, Llovera signed a minor league deal with the San Francisco Giants. He was assigned to the Triple-A Sacramento River Cats to begin the 2022 season.

On April 29, 2022, Llovera was selected to the active roster after multiple relievers were placed on the COVID-19 injured list. After allowing one run in four innings of work, Llovera was returned to Sacramento on May 6. On May 16, Llovera was selected back to the Giants’ roster. Llovera suffered a Grade 2 right flexor strain in July and missed the remainder of the season after he was placed on the 60-day injured list on July 21. With Sacramento, Llovera made 15 scoreless relief appearances, striking out 28 in 20.0 innings pitched while notching two wins and one save. With the Giants he was 0-0 with a 4.41 ERA, collecting 20 strikeouts in 16 1/3 innings pitched.

On November 18, 2022, Llovera was non-tendered by San Francisco and became a free agent. On November 19, Llovera re-signed with the Giants organization on a minor league contract. He was assigned to Triple–A Sacramento to begin the 2023 season, where he made 17 appearances and posted a 3.92 ERA with 24 strikeouts in 20 2/3 innings pitched. On July 6, 2023, the Giants selected Llovera's contract, adding him to the active roster. He pitched well in 5 games, posting a 1.69 ERA with 5 strikeouts across 5 1/3 innings, before he was designated for assignment on July 22.

=== Boston Red Sox ===
On July 26, 2023, Llovera was traded to the Boston Red Sox in exchange for minor-league pitcher Marques Johnson. He was added to Boston's active roster on July 29. Llovera made his Red Sox debut that same day at Oracle Park against the Giants, his former team. In 25 appearances for Boston, he registered a 5.46 ERA with 24 strikeouts across 29 2/3 innings pitched. On January 3, 2024, Llovera was designated for assignment to make room for Lucas Giolito on the 40-man roster.

=== Seattle Mariners ===
On January 10, 2024, Llovera was claimed off waivers by the Seattle Mariners. He was removed from the 40–man roster and sent outright to the Triple–A Tacoma Rainiers on March 14. In 17 games split between Tacoma and the rookie–level Arizona Complex League Mariners, Llovera compiled a 4.58 ERA with 14 strikeouts across 19 2/3 innings pitched. He was released by the Mariners organization on August 13.

=== York Revolution ===
On March 11, 2025, Llovera signed with the York Revolution of the Atlantic League of Professional Baseball. In 30 appearances for the Revolution, he posted a 4-1 record and 5.34 ERA with 37 strikeouts and one save across 28 2/3 innings pitched. Llovera was released by York on August 31.
