= OMG (Candelita song) =

Single by Candelita
- Released: June 28, 2024
- Recorded: 2024
- Genre: Latin pop
- Length: 2:27

"OMG" is a 2024 song by Major League Baseball infielder Jose Iglesias, performing under the stage name Candelita. The song debuted at #1 on the Billboard Latin Digital Song Sales chart and became a rallying cry for the New York Mets during their 2024 season.

== Composition and recording ==
José Iglesias became interested in music production after defecting to the United States from his home country of Cuba in 2008 at the age of 18. In February 2024, after having signed a minor league contract with the New York Mets in the offseason, Iglesias (using the stage name Candelita) released a single and music video for "No Voy A Volver," a collaboration with the Cuban singer Lenier. Like "No Voy A Volver," "OMG" was composed and recorded by Iglesias during his down time from baseball activities.

Iglesias said he wrote "OMG" during the offseason while sitting at a table at his home west of Miami, looking out at his ranch at night. He later recalled that he thought to himself, "This is the type of energy I need, and anything negative should just be pushed away." The lyrics of the song's chorus are: "Oh My God, todo lo malo échalo pa’ allá (Everything that's bad, push it to the side), Oh My God, dame salud y prosperidad (Give me health and prosperity)."

== Use by the New York Mets ==
On May 31, 2024, Iglesias was added to the New York Mets' active roster. Upon joining the club from their Triple-A affiliate the Syracuse Mets, Iglesias began using the still-unreleased song "OMG" as his walk-up music. His teammate J. D. Martinez urged Iglesias to play the whole song for the team, and the Mets began playing it in the clubhouse as the team embarked on a hot streak. The team started singing the chorus whenever a player hit a home run, and soon "OMG" was played over the stadium speakers at Citi Field as a home-run celebration.

Iglesias originally planned to release the single on July 3, 2024, but the date was moved up to June 28, when the Mets started a home series against the Houston Astros. After the Mets won the game, the team celebrated with a post-game concert at Citi Field at which Iglesias sang "OMG," with teammates and fans joining in on the chorus. The song became an unofficial Mets team anthem for the rest of the season. A celebratory "OMG" sign was added to the dugout, held by players after each Mets home run.

Iglesias also performed "OMG" at the 2024 Major League Baseball Home Run Derby on July 15, 2024.

A remix featuring Pitbull and Silvestre Dangond was recorded for release on October 11, 2024.

== Chart performance ==
The single "OMG" reached #1 on the iTunes Latin Pop charts on June 29, 2024, immediately after the release of the song on streaming services, accompanied by a music video. It debuted at #1 on the Billboard Latin Digital Song Sales chart for the week dated July 20, 2024. The music video has received more than 5 million views on YouTube.
