= Jose Iglesias (baseball) =

Cuban-born American baseball player (born 1990)

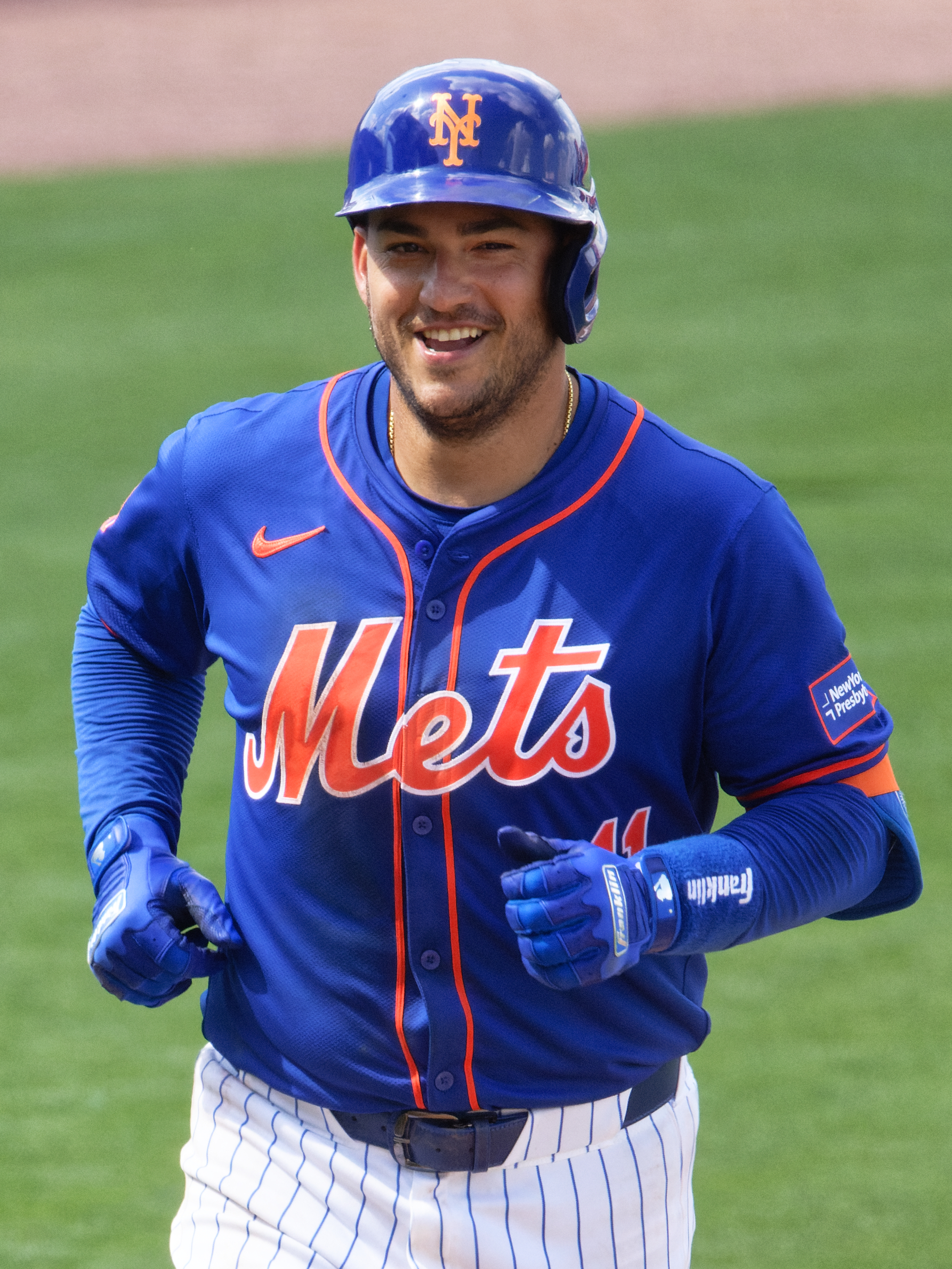
- Iglesias with the Mets in 2024

Free agent
- Shortstop / Second baseman
- Born: January 5, 1990 (age 36); Havana, Cuba
- Bats: Right Throws: Right

MLB debut
- May 8, 2011, for the Boston Red Sox

MLB statistics (through 2025 season)
- Batting average: .279
- Hits: 1,207
- Home runs: 54
- Runs batted in: 428
- Stolen bases: 70
- Stats at Baseball Reference

Teams
- Boston Red Sox (2011–2013); Detroit Tigers (2013, 2015–2018); Cincinnati Reds (2019); Baltimore Orioles (2020); Los Angeles Angels (2021); Boston Red Sox (2021); Colorado Rockies (2022); New York Mets (2024); San Diego Padres (2025)

Career highlights and awards
- All-Star (2015)

Jose Antonio Iglesias Alemán (born January 5, 1990) is a Cuban-born American professional baseball shortstop and second baseman who is a free agent. He has played in Major League Baseball (MLB) for the Boston Red Sox, Detroit Tigers, Cincinnati Reds, Baltimore Orioles, Los Angeles Angels, Colorado Rockies, New York Mets, and San Diego Padres. He made his MLB debut in 2011. Listed at 5 feet 11 inches (1.80 m) and 195 pounds (88 kg), he bats and throws right-handed.

In addition to his baseball career, Iglesias is a Latin pop singer, performing under the name Candelita; as a musical artist, he is best known for his song "OMG".

== Professional baseball career ==
=== Defection and minors ===
While in Cuba, Iglesias played with La Habana of the Cuban National Series. With pitcher Noel Argüelles, Iglesias defected from the Cuban junior national team while in Canada in July 2008. Iglesias signed as an international amateur free agent with the Boston Red Sox in September 2009. Prior to the 2011 season, Iglesias was the sole Red Sox prospect on the MLB.com annual list of top 50 baseball prospects, where he was ranked 42nd.

=== Boston Red Sox (2011–2013) ===
In March 2011, Iglesias was optioned to the Triple-A Pawtucket Red Sox. Iglesias was called up by the Red Sox and made his major league debut on May 8, 2011, as a defensive substitute for Jed Lowrie in the ninth inning of a 9–5 win over the Minnesota Twins. In the next game, he represented the game-winning run, scoring from first base on a Carl Crawford double in the 11th inning. On May 11, 2011, Iglesias made his first MLB start due to Jed Lowrie being sick.

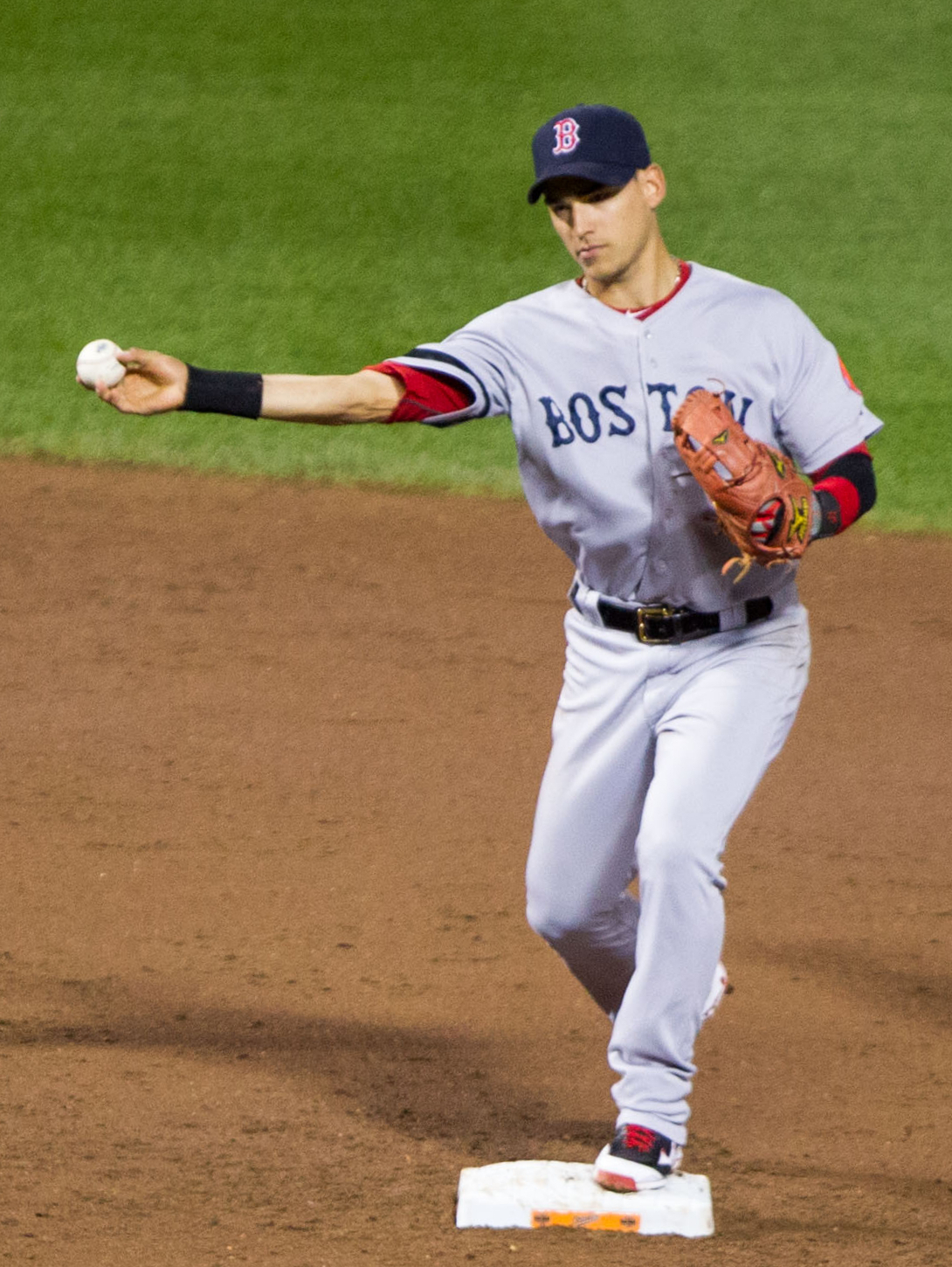
Iglesias playing for the Boston Red Sox in 2012

Iglesias started the 2012 season in Pawtucket. He was called up to Boston May 1 after an ailing back sidelined Kevin Youkilis, but he did not appear in a game before being sent back down to Triple-A. Iglesias also appeared late in the 2012 season to back up Mike Avilés, and hit his first career home run during this stretch.

Entering 2013, Iglesias was ranked as the 10th best prospect in the Red Sox organization, and 96th on the MLB.com Top 100 Prospects list. He started the season in Boston, going 9-for-20 with two doubles and one RBI in six games, but was optioned to Triple-A Pawtucket after Stephen Drew was activated on April 10. He was recalled by the Red Sox on May 24 when third baseman Will Middlebrooks was placed on the DL. Iglesias excelled while splitting time between shortstop and third base, remaining in the starting lineup even after Middlebrooks returned from the DL. Despite being known primarily for his defense, Iglesias batted .420 for a stretch of over 100 at-bats after being recalled, including an 18-game hitting streak that was broken on June 19 against the Tampa Bay Rays. For his efforts, he was named the American League Rookie of the Month for June. Iglesias started the 2013 season playing 63 games with a .330 batting average, a home run, and 19 RBIs while with Boston.

=== Detroit Tigers (2013–2018) ===
On July 30, Iglesias was traded to the Detroit Tigers in a three-team deal that sent Jake Peavy and Brayan Villarreal to the Boston Red Sox and Avisail García and Frankie Montas to the Chicago White Sox. Iglesias chose jersey No. 1, making him the first Tigers player to wear it since Lou Whitaker retired in 1995. Following the 50-game suspension given to Tigers' starting shortstop Jhonny Peralta on August 5 for his connections to the South Florida Biogenesis clinic, Iglesias was named the Tigers' new everyday shortstop.

For the rest of the 2013 season with the Tigers, Iglesias batted .259 with two home runs, and 10 RBIs in 46 games. Overall in 2013, Iglesias hit .303 with 3 home runs and 29 RBIs in 109 games combined with both the Red Sox and Tigers. On the field, he committed 6 errors in 357 chances. Iglesias was part of the Tigers' 25-man active roster for their postseason run. During the postseason, Iglesias batted .231 with one RBI. Iglesias finished second in the American League Rookie of the Year voting in 2013, being edged out by Wil Myers.

On January 8, 2014, Iglesias and the Tigers agreed to terms on a one-year contract worth $1.65 million. Although Iglesias was under team control through 2018, his 2014 salary had yet to be determined after the contract he signed with the Red Sox as an amateur free agent expired. Iglesias missed the entire 2014 season due to stress fractures in both of his shins.

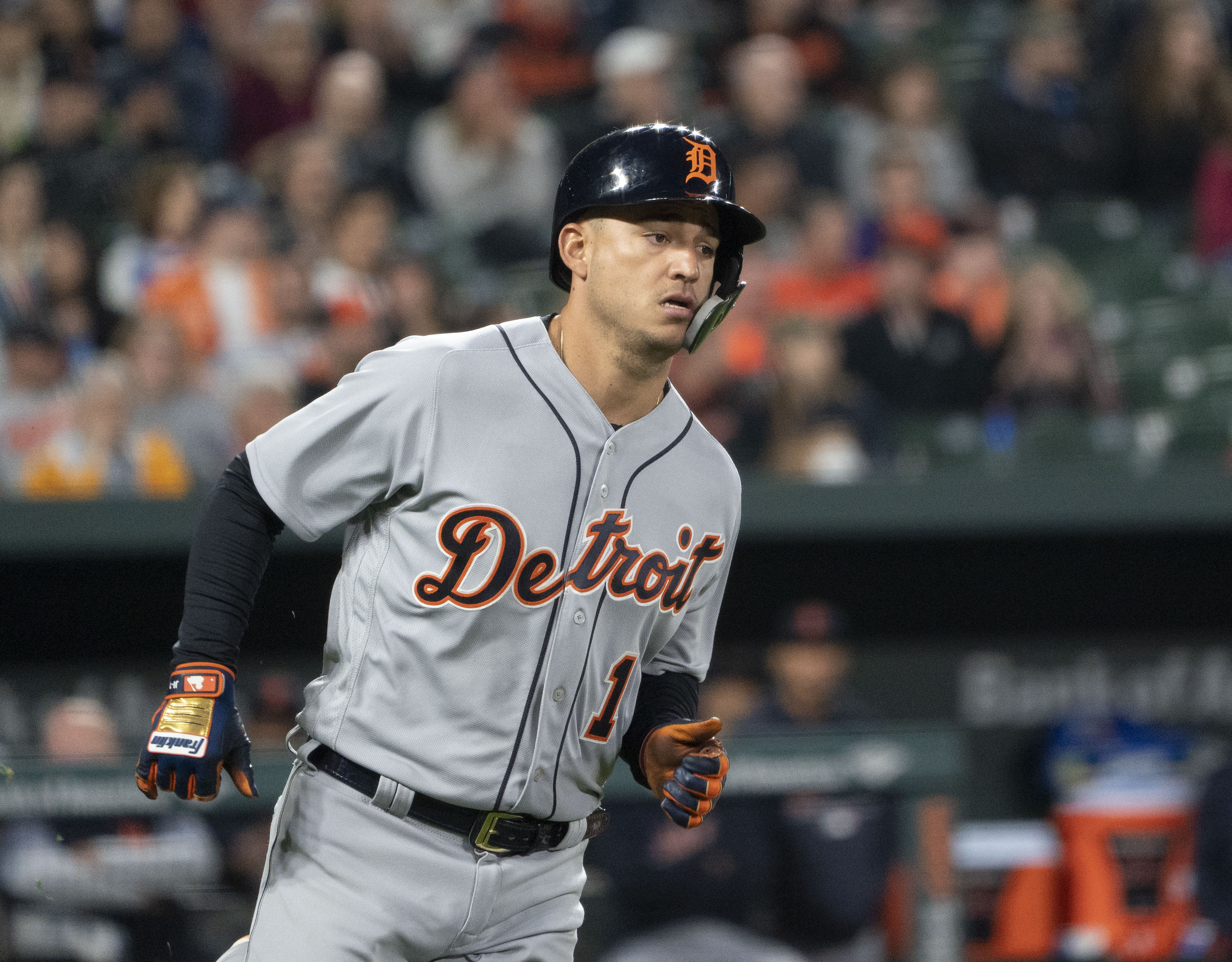
Iglesias with the Tigers in 2018

On July 6, 2015, Iglesias was named as a reserve for the American League at the 2015 All-Star Game. On September 5, it was announced that Iglesias suffered a non-displaced small fracture in his right middle finger at the PIP joint after being hit on the hand by a pitch, and the team announced he would be out for at least two weeks. With the Tigers later falling out of the AL Central race, the team elected to not activate him from the DL for the remainder of the season. During the 2015 season, Iglesias posted a .300 batting average in 416 at-bats, with 17 doubles, two home runs and 23 RBIs.

On January 15, 2016, the Tigers avoided arbitration with Iglesias, agreeing on a one-year, $2.1 million contract. Iglesias made one trip to the disabled list in 2016, after suffering a left hamstring strain in August, but still reached career highs with 137 games, 467 at-bats and 26 doubles, and had the lowest strikeout percentage of all major league baseball players (9.7%), as he also had the highest contact percentage on his swings in the major leagues (91.2%). He finished the season with a .255 batting average, 4 home runs and 32 RBI.

Following the season, Iglesias was named a Gold Glove Award finalist for shortstop, along with Francisco Lindor and Andrelton Simmons. With just five errors in 574 chances, he posted an AL-best .991 fielding percentage. His 11.6 ultimate zone rating (UZR) ranked third among AL shortstops.

On January 13, 2017, the Tigers avoided arbitration with Iglesias, agreeing on a one-year, $4.1 million contract. Iglesias batted .255 during the 2017 season. Despite appearing in just 130 games due to injuries, he set career highs in doubles (33), home runs (6) and RBI (54).

On January 17, 2018, the Tigers avoided arbitration with Iglesias, agreeing on a one-year, $6.275 million contract. Iglesias batted .269 during the 2018 season after appearing in 125 games, and stole a career-high 15 bases. He was transferred to the 60-day disabled list on September 14 with a lower abdominal strain, effectively ending his season.

=== Cincinnati Reds (2019) ===
On February 23, 2019, Iglesias signed a minor league deal with the Cincinnati Reds that included an invitation to spring training. The one-year contract included a guaranteed $2.5 million salary with up to $1 million in additional incentives. Expected to back up starting second baseman Scooter Gennett, Iglesias became a starter for the Reds when Gennett was injured late in spring training.

In 2019 he batted .288/.318/.407, while reaching career highs in home runs (11) and RBI (59). He made contact with the highest percentage of pitches he swung at outside the strike zone (82.6%) of all National Leaguers.

=== Baltimore Orioles (2020) ===
On January 7, 2020, Iglesias signed with the Baltimore Orioles on a one-year deal worth $3 million. The deal included a club option for 2021 at an additional $3 million.

On July 24, 2020, Iglesias was the starting shortstop, making his Orioles debut on Opening Day against the Boston Red Sox. He slashed .373/.400/.556 with 17 doubles, three home runs and 24 RBI in 39 games despite lower-body injuries limiting him to 22 defensive starts in 2020.

=== Los Angeles Angels (2021) ===
One month after the Orioles had exercised his $3.5 million club option on November 1, Iglesias was traded to the Los Angeles Angels for minor league right-handed pitchers Garrett Stallings and Jean Pinto on December 2, 2020. Iglesias played in 114 games for the Angels, hitting .259 with eight home runs and 41 RBI. On September 3, 2021, the Angels released Iglesias, clearing roster space for pitcher Janson Junk.

=== Boston Red Sox (2021) ===
On September 6, 2021, Iglesias was signed by the Boston Red Sox. He made his formal return to the team later that day when he entered as a defensive substitution for Taylor Motter in the top of the 8th inning. Through the end of the regular season, Iglesias appeared in 23 games with Boston, including 14 starts at second base, while batting .356 with one home run and 7 RBIs. While the Red Sox advanced to the 2021 postseason, Iglesias was ineligible, due to joining the organization after August 31. On October 6, Boston assigned him outright to Triple-A.

=== Colorado Rockies (2022) ===
On March 16, 2022, Iglesias signed a one-year contract with the Colorado Rockies. Iglesias appeared in 118 games for the Rockies, slashing .292/.328/.380 with 3 home runs and 47 RBI across 439 at-bats. He became a free agent following the season.

=== Miami Marlins (2023) ===
On March 9, 2023, Iglesias signed a minor league contract with the Miami Marlins organization. On March 26, the Marlins announced that Iglesias had not made the Opening Day roster. Rather than exercising his opt-out clause, Iglesias chose to accept an assignment to the Triple-A Jacksonville Jumbo Shrimp. On April 20, Iglesias triggered the opt-out clause in his contract and elected free agency.

=== San Diego Padres (2023) ===
On April 25, 2023, Iglesias signed a minor league contract with the San Diego Padres organization. On May 25, Iglesias opted out of his contract and became a free agent. Iglesias re-signed with the Padres on a new minor league contract on May 30. He played in 28 games for the Triple-A El Paso Chihuahuas, hitting .317/.356/.537 with 4 home runs and 27 RBI. On June 19, Iglesias again opted out of his minor league contract and became a free agent.

=== New York Mets (2024) ===
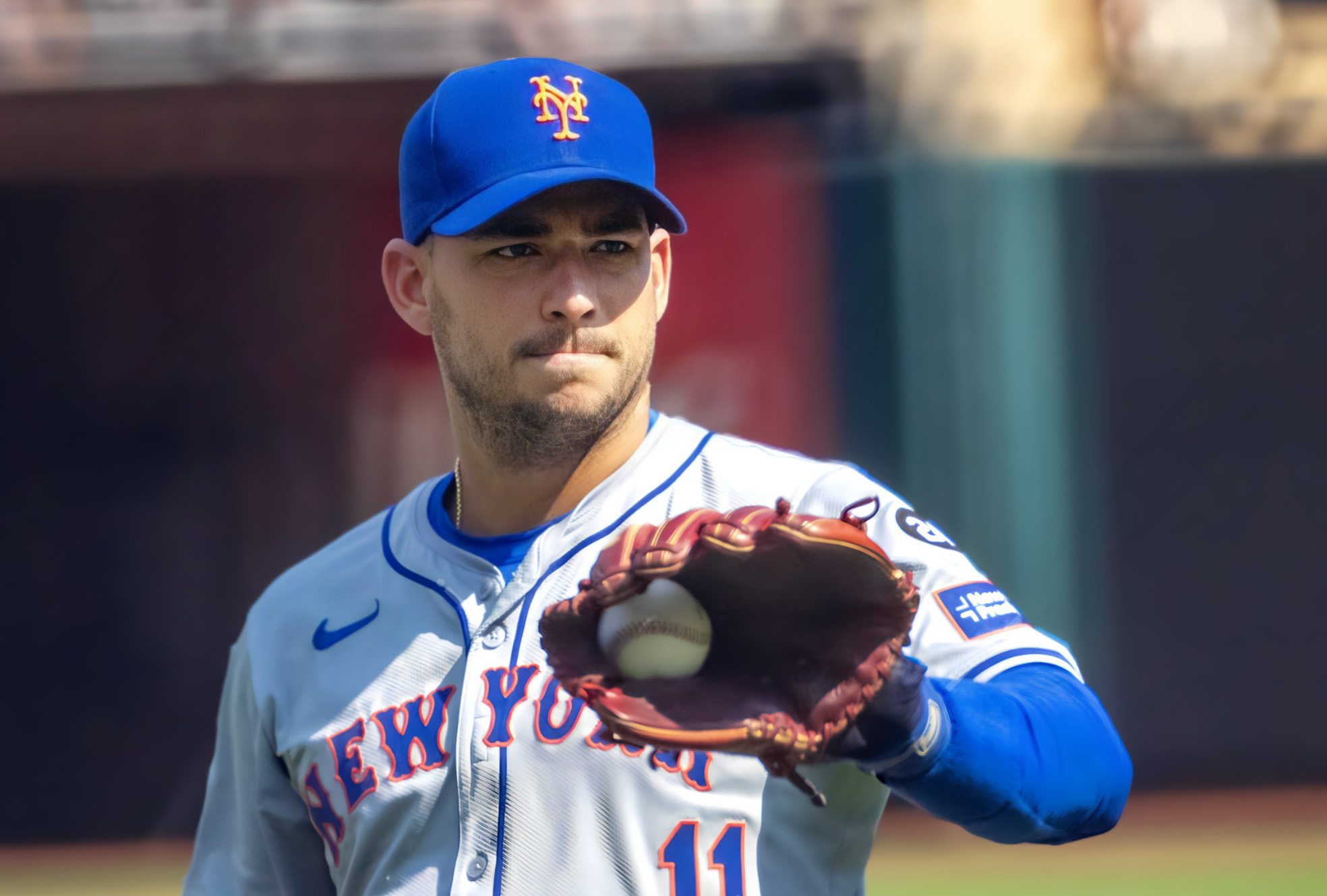
Iglesias with the Mets in 2024

On December 4, 2023, Iglesias signed a minor league contract with the New York Mets. He began 2024 with the Triple–A Syracuse Mets, hitting .273/.309/.442 with seven home runs and 29 RBI. On May 31, 2024, Iglesias had his contract selected and was added to the Mets' active roster.

By the All-Star break on July 14, Iglesias was batting .380 with a .999 OPS. From May 31 to July 14, the Mets posted a 26–13 record, the best in the MLB. The hit Spanish-language song he recorded, "OMG," became the anthem of the team. During this season, the team became known as the "OMG" Mets, and they used an "OMG" sign to celebrate runs scored. At the end of that season, one of the two "OMG" Mets signs was added to the National Baseball Hall of Fame in Cooperstown, N.Y.

Iglesias took over second base when Jeff McNeil broke his wrist on September 7 in a game against the Cincinnati Reds and was ruled out for the rest of the season. In 2024, Iglesias appeared in 85 games for the Mets, batting .337/.381/.448 with 4 home runs and 26 RBI. From May 31 to September 30, the Mets posted a 66–40 record, the best in MLB. Iglesias also finished the season with a 22-game hitting streak, batting .395 (34-for-86) with one home run and 4 RBI between September 6 and 30.

=== San Diego Padres (2025) ===
On March 5, 2025, Iglesias signed a minor league contract with the San Diego Padres that included an invitation to spring training. On March 23, it was announced that he made the Padres' Opening Day roster. His contract was officially selected on March 27. On August 12, Iglesias hit a two-run home run against the San Francisco Giants, marking his first home run of the season. Iglesias finished the season with 36 RBI, three home runs, and a batting average of .229.

== Music and acting career ==
Iglesias is also a Latin Pop music artist who performs under the name Candelita, translating to "little candle" in Spanish. His single "OMG" hit number 1 on the iTunes Latin Pop charts in late June 2024 and debuted at number 1 on the Billboard Latin Digital Song Sales chart the following month. The song caught on among his teammates and fans and he performed it at Citi Field on June 28 after a Mets victory over the Houston Astros. He performed "OMG" at the 2024 Major League Baseball Home Run Derby.

In August 2026, Iglesias made his Broadway debut playing the role of the Narrator in the musical Buena Vista Social Club.

== Personal life ==
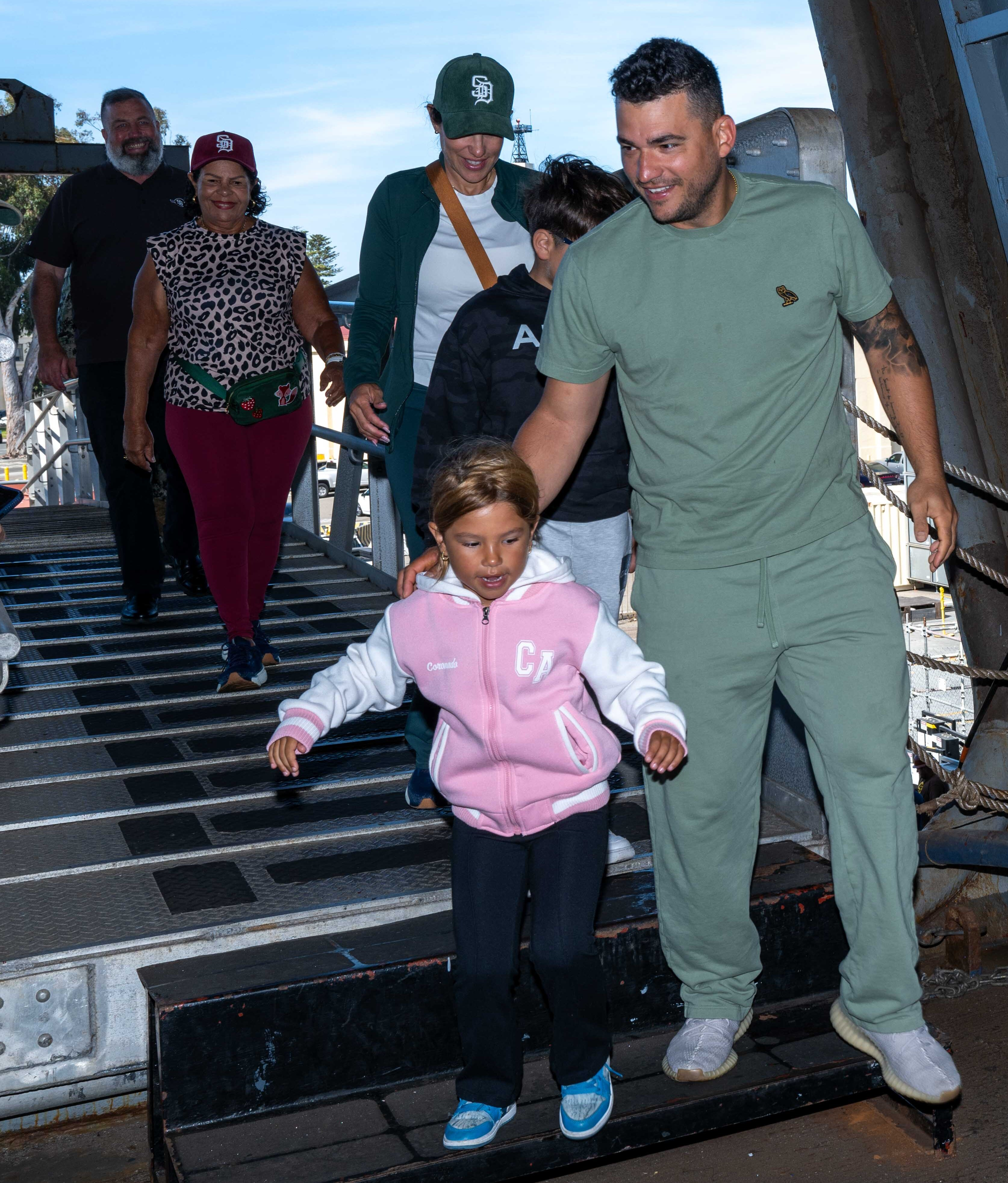
Iglesias (right) with family in 2025

On June 25, 2018, Iglesias became a naturalized United States citizen. Iglesias had a son born in Coconut Grove, Florida a day before Hurricane Irma arrived in the area in 2017 and a daughter born in June 2019.

== See also ==
- List of baseball players who defected from Cuba

Awards
Preceded by Nate Freiman	AL Rookie of the Month; June 2013	Succeeded by Chris Archer
