= 2024 Major League Baseball All-Star Game =

| | 1 | 2 | 3 | 4 | 5 | 6 | 7 | 8 | 9 | R | H | E |
|---|---|---|---|---|---|---|---|---|---|---|---|---|
| National League | 0 | 0 | 3 | 0 | 0 | 0 | 0 | 0 | 0 | 3 | 10 | 0 |
| American League | 0 | 0 | 3 | 0 | 2 | 0 | 0 | 0 | X | 5 | 5 | 0 |
- Date: July 16, 2024
- Venue: Globe Life Field
- City: Arlington, Texas
- Managers: Torey Lovullo (AZ); Bruce Bochy (TEX)
- MVP: Jarren Duran (BOS)
- Attendance: 39,343
- Television: Fox (United States); Fox Deportes; MLB International (International)
- TV announcers: Joe Davis, John Smoltz, Ken Rosenthal and Tom Verducci (Fox); Adrián García Márquez, Edgar González, Carlos Álvarez and Jaime Motta (Fox Deportes); Dave Flemming and Yonder Alonso (MLB International)
- Radio: ESPN
- Radio announcers: Karl Ravech, Doug Glanville, Tim Kurkjian and Buster Olney

The 2024 Major League Baseball All-Star Game was the 94th All-Star Game of Major League Baseball (MLB). The game was played between the American League (AL) and the National League (NL) on July 16, 2024. The game was hosted by the Texas Rangers of the AL at Globe Life Field in Arlington, Texas. Manager Torey Lovullo of the Arizona Diamondbacks managed the NL team, while Manager Bruce Bochy of the Texas Rangers managed the AL team, continuing the tradition of having the previous year’s pennant-winning managers lead their respective leagues in the All-Star Game. The game was broadcast nationally by Fox, Fox Deportes, and ESPN Radio.

== Background ==
=== Host selection ===
The Texas Rangers were awarded the game on November 17, 2022, by Major League Baseball Commissioner Rob Manfred. This was the second time that the Rangers hosted an All-Star Game in franchise history, having previously done so in 1995 at The Ballpark in Arlington, which was reconfigured and renamed Choctaw Stadium after the Rangers moved to Globe Life Field in 2020. In addition, this was the first All-Star Game since 1939 to be hosted by the reigning World Series champions. This was in spite of Texas Governor Greg Abbott saying in 2021 (after the 2021 game was moved from Atlanta due to a contentious voting law) that he would not be bidding for any future MLB events.

=== Roster selections ===
The starting rosters for each league's position players plus designated hitter (DH) were determined by fan balloting, which was conducted in two phases. Since 2022, the first-phase top vote-getter for each league automatically received a spot in the starting lineup. The top two vote-getters for every other non-pitching position and DH advanced to the second phase of voting. There are normally six finalists for the three outfield positions in each league, except when an outfielder is the top vote-getter, in which case there are four finalists for the remaining two outfield positions. Voting does not carry over between phases.

First phase voting was held from June 5 through June 27, and second phase voting was held from June 30 through July 3. All voting was conducted online, at MLB.com or via the MLB app. Starting players, as selected via voting, were announced on July 3. Reserve position players and all pitchers—selected "via 'Player Ballot' choices and selections made by the Commissioner’s Office"—was announced on July 7.

The leading vote getter in each league during phase one was Aaron Judge of the New York Yankees and Bryce Harper of the Philadelphia Phillies. Judge received the most votes during phase one with 3,425,309 votes.

=== Logo and uniforms ===
The 2024 All-Star Game logo featured imagery that represents the culture and pride of Texas. The typeface is based on the Rangers' current typography, and a five-point star in the middle of the words "ALL" and "STAR" symbolized Texas' nickname of the "Lone Star State". Within the logo is an outline of Texas along with illustrations that were symbols to Texas culture.

The American League uniforms featured a sand base with coral red sleeves and light blue cuffs. Caps are in coral red with a sand front panel, featuring the team logo in front of coral red and light blue stripes leading to a silver star on the right. The National League uniforms featured a navy blue base with light blue sleeves and coral red cuffs. Caps are in light blue with a navy blue front panel, featuring the team logo in front of light blue and coral red stripes leading to a silver star on the right. Both uniforms featured the full league name in front, the player's team logo on the left sleeve, and the All-Star Game logo on the right sleeve.

== Rosters ==
=== National League ===
Elected starters
| Position | Player | Team | All-Star Games |
|---|---|---|---|
| C | William Contreras | Brewers | 2 |
| 1B | Bryce Harper† | Phillies | 8 |
| 2B | Ketel Marte | Diamondbacks | 2 |
| 3B | Alec Bohm | Phillies | 1 |
| SS | Trea Turner | Phillies | 3 |
| OF | Jurickson Profar | Padres | 1 |
| OF | Fernando Tatís Jr.^{#} | Padres | 2 |
| OF | Christian Yelich | Brewers | 3 |
| DH | Shohei Ohtani | Dodgers | 4 |

Reserves
| Position | Player | Team | All-Star Games |
|---|---|---|---|
| C | Will Smith | Dodgers | 2 |
| 1B | Pete Alonso | Mets | 4 |
| 1B | Freddie Freeman | Dodgers | 8 |
| 2B | Luis Arráez | Padres | 3 |
| 3B | Ryan McMahon | Rockies | 1 |
| SS | CJ Abrams | Nationals | 1 |
| SS | Mookie Betts | Dodgers | 8 |
| SS | Elly De La Cruz | Reds | 1 |
| OF | Teoscar Hernández^{[J]} | Dodgers | 2 |
| OF | Jackson Merrill | Padres | 1 |
| OF | Heliot Ramos | Giants | 1 |
| OF | Bryan Reynolds | Pirates | 2 |
| DH | Marcell Ozuna | Braves | 3 |

Pitchers
| Player | Team | All-Star Games |
|---|---|---|
| Kyle Finnegan^{[K]} | Nationals | 1 |
| Max Fried^{[H]} | Braves | 2 |
| Tyler Glasnow^{#} | Dodgers | 1 |
| Hunter Greene^{[B]} | Reds | 1 |
| Ryan Helsley^{#} | Cardinals | 2 |
| Jeff Hoffman | Phillies | 1 |
| Shōta Imanaga | Cubs | 1 |
| Reynaldo López | Braves | 1 |
| Chris Sale^{#} | Braves | 8 |
| Cristopher Sánchez^{[G]} | Phillies | 1 |
| Tanner Scott | Marlins | 1 |
| Paul Skenes | Pirates | 1 |
| Matt Strahm | Phillies | 1 |
| Ranger Suárez^{#} | Phillies | 1 |
| Robert Suárez | Padres | 1 |
| Logan Webb | Giants | 1 |
| Zack Wheeler | Phillies | 2 |

=== American League ===
Elected starters
| Position | Player | Team | All-Star Games |
|---|---|---|---|
| C | Adley Rutschman | Orioles | 2 |
| 1B | Vladimir Guerrero Jr. | Blue Jays | 4 |
| 2B | Jose Altuve^{#} | Astros | 9 |
| 3B | José Ramírez | Guardians | 6 |
| SS | Gunnar Henderson | Orioles | 1 |
| OF | Aaron Judge† | Yankees | 6 |
| OF | Steven Kwan | Guardians | 1 |
| OF | Juan Soto | Yankees | 4 |
| DH | Yordan Alvarez | Astros | 3 |

Reserves
| Position | Player | Team | All-Star Games |
|---|---|---|---|
| C | Salvador Pérez | Royals | 9 |
| 1B | Josh Naylor | Guardians | 1 |
| 2B | Willi Castro^{[C]} | Twins | 1 |
| 2B | Marcus Semien^{[D]} | Rangers | 3 |
| 3B | Rafael Devers^{#} | Red Sox | 3 |
| 3B | Isaac Paredes | Rays | 1 |
| 3B | Jordan Westburg^{[A]} | Orioles | 1 |
| SS | Carlos Correa^{#} | Twins | 3 |
| SS | Corey Seager^{[I]} | Rangers | 5 |
| SS | Bobby Witt Jr. | Royals | 1 |
| OF | Jarren Duran | Red Sox | 1 |
| OF | Riley Greene | Tigers | 1 |
| OF | Anthony Santander^{[E]} | Orioles | 1 |
| OF | Kyle Tucker^{#} | Astros | 3 |
| DH | David Fry | Guardians | 1 |

Pitchers
| Player | Team | All-Star Games |
|---|---|---|
| Tyler Anderson^{#} | Angels | 2 |
| Corbin Burnes | Orioles | 4 |
| Emmanuel Clase | Guardians | 3 |
| Garrett Crochet | White Sox | 1 |
| Logan Gilbert^{#} | Mariners | 1 |
| Clay Holmes | Yankees | 2 |
| Tanner Houck | Red Sox | 1 |
| Seth Lugo | Royals | 1 |
| Mason Miller | Athletics | 1 |
| Andrés Muñoz^{[F]} | Mariners | 1 |
| Cole Ragans | Royals | 1 |
| Tarik Skubal | Tigers | 1 |
| Kirby Yates | Rangers | 2 |

† Denotes top vote-getter in each league

==== Roster notes ====
1. Jordan Westburg was named as the roster replacement for Rafael Devers due to injury.
2. Hunter Greene was named as the roster replacement for Tyler Glasnow due to injury.
3. Willi Castro was named as the roster replacement for Jose Altuve due to injury.
4. Marcus Semien was named starter in place of Jose Altuve due to injury.
5. Anthony Santander was named as the roster replacement for Kyle Tucker due to injury.
6. Andrés Muñoz was named as the roster replacement for Logan Gilbert due to Gilbert starting on Sunday.
7. Cristopher Sánchez was named as the roster replacement for Chris Sale due to Sale starting on Sunday.
8. Max Fried was named as the roster replacement for Ranger Suárez due to injury.
9. Corey Seager was named as the roster replacement for Carlos Correa due to injury.
10. Teoscar Hernández was named starter in place of Fernando Tatís Jr. due to injury.
11. Kyle Finnegan was named as the roster replacement for Ryan Helsley due to Helsley electing not to pitch.

#: Indicates player would not play (replaced as per reference notes above).

== Game summary ==
=== Starting lineup ===
National League
| Order | Player | Team | Position |
|---|---|---|---|
| 1 | Ketel Marte | Diamondbacks | 2B |
| 2 | Shohei Ohtani | Dodgers | DH |
| 3 | Trea Turner | Phillies | SS |
| 4 | Bryce Harper | Phillies | 1B |
| 5 | William Contreras | Brewers | C |
| 6 | Christian Yelich | Brewers | RF |
| 7 | Alec Bohm | Phillies | 3B |
| 8 | Teoscar Hernández | Dodgers | CF |
| 9 | Jurickson Profar | Padres | LF |
| — | Paul Skenes | Pirates | P |

American League
| Order | Player | Team | Position |
|---|---|---|---|
| 1 | Steven Kwan | Guardians | LF |
| 2 | Gunnar Henderson | Orioles | SS |
| 3 | Juan Soto | Yankees | RF |
| 4 | Aaron Judge | Yankees | CF |
| 5 | Yordan Alvarez | Astros | DH |
| 6 | José Ramírez | Guardians | 3B |
| 7 | Vladimir Guerrero Jr. | Blue Jays | 1B |
| 8 | Adley Rutschman | Orioles | C |
| 9 | Marcus Semien | Rangers | 2B |
| — | Corbin Burnes | Orioles | P |

=== Line score ===
July 16, 2024 7:20 pm (CDT) Globe Life Field in Arlington, Texas (retractable roof closed)
| Team | 1 | 2 | 3 | 4 | 5 | 6 | 7 | 8 | 9 | R | H | E |
|---|---|---|---|---|---|---|---|---|---|---|---|---|
| National League | 0 | 0 | 3 | 0 | 0 | 0 | 0 | 0 | 0 | 3 | 10 | 0 |
| American League | 0 | 0 | 3 | 0 | 2 | 0 | 0 | 0 | x | 5 | 5 | 0 |
Starting pitchers: NL: Paul Skenes; AL: Corbin Burnes; WP: Mason Miller (1–0) LP: Hunter Greene (0–1) Sv: Emmanuel Clase (1); Home runs: NL: Shohei Ohtani (1); AL: Jarren Duran (1); Attendance: 39,343 Time: 2:28; Umpires: HP – James Hoye; 1B – Bruce Dreckman; 2B – John Tumpane; 3B – Nic Lentz; LF – Ben May; RF – Nestor Ceja; Replay Official – Rob Drake; Boxscore

Female country duo Nice Horse sang the Canadian national anthem while country singer and Texas native Cody Johnson sang the American national anthem. Adrián Beltré threw the ceremonial first pitch.

In the top of the third inning, Jurickson Profar singled to right field, followed by Ketel Marte reaching on an infield single. Then, Shohei Ohtani hit a three-run home run off pitcher Tanner Houck, leading off the National League at 3–0. In the bottom half of the third inning, Juan Soto hit an RBI double to score Steven Kwan and Marcus Semien. Soto would later score to tie the game at 3–3 with an RBI single from David Fry.

In the bottom of the fifth, Anthony Santander singled, then Jarren Duran hit the game winning two-run home run to give the American League their first lead at 5–3. Duran went 1–2 with one home run, two RBI and one run scored and went on to win the 2024 All-Star Game Most Valuable Player Award, the fifth in Boston Red Sox history.

Emmanuel Clase recorded the final three outs to give the American League a 5–3 win over the National League. It was the American League's tenth win in the previous eleven All-Star Games (or twelve years). (Note: Not including the canceled 2020 MLB All-Star Game due to the COVID-19 pandemic.)

== See also ==
- 2024 Major League Baseball Home Run Derby
- All-Star Futures Game
- List of Major League Baseball All-Star Games
- Major League Baseball All-Star Game Most Valuable Player Award
