= Tanner Houck =

American baseball player (born 1996)

Boston Red Sox – No. 89
- Pitcher
- Born: June 29, 1996 (age 30); St. Louis, Missouri, U.S.
- Bats: Right Throws: Right

MLB debut
- September 15, 2020, for the Boston Red Sox

MLB statistics (through 2026 season)
- Win–loss record: 24–33
- Earned run average: 4.00
- Strikeouts: 450
- Stats at Baseball Reference

Teams
- Boston Red Sox (2020–present)

Career highlights and awards
- All-Star (2024)

Tanner Lee Houck (/haʊk/; born June 29, 1996) is an American professional baseball pitcher for the Boston Red Sox of Major League Baseball (MLB). He was drafted by the Red Sox with the 24th overall pick in the 2017 MLB draft. Listed at 6 feet 5 inches (1.96 m) and 230 pounds (100 kg), he throws and bats right-handed.

== Amateur career ==
Houck attended Collinsville High School in Collinsville, Illinois. He was drafted by the Toronto Blue Jays in the 12th round of the 2014 MLB draft, but did not sign and attended the University of Missouri to play college baseball. As a freshman at Missouri in 2015, Houck started 15 games, going 8–5 with a 3.49 earned run average (ERA) and 91 strikeouts and only 12 walks in 100 2/3 innings. As a sophomore, Houck started 15 games and was 5–6 with a 2.99 ERA and 106 strikeouts.

== Professional career ==
=== Draft and minor leagues ===
The Boston Red Sox selected Houck with the 24th overall pick in the 2017 MLB draft. He signed on June 21, 2017, and was assigned to the Low–A Lowell Spinners, where he spent the whole season, posting an 0–3 record with a 3.63 ERA in 22 1/3 innings pitched. In 2018, he played with the Class A-Advanced Salem Red Sox where he pitched to a 7–11 record with a 4.24 ERA in 23 starts.

In 2019, he began with the Double-A Portland Sea Dogs, and was promoted to the Triple-A Pawtucket Red Sox on July 13. Overall during 2019, Houck was 8–6 with a 4.01 ERA and 107 strikeouts in 107 2/3 innings. Following the 2019 regular season, Houck made six starts for the Peoria Javelinas of the Arizona Fall League.

=== Boston Red Sox ===
==== 2020–2023 ====
During the start-delayed 2020 MLB season, Houck won his MLB debut against the Miami Marlins on September 15, allowing two hits and no runs in five innings pitched while striking out seven batters. Those strikeouts resulted in Houck donating $700 to his charity, Pitch for Adoption, as before the game he had pledged to donate $100 for each strikeout. While Houck was a freshman in high school, his family adopted a 4-year-old girl, which moved him to become a supporter for adoption. Houck became only the fourth player in Red Sox history to strike out seven or more batters and not allow any runs in an MLB debut game. In Houck's second start, against the New York Yankees on September 20, he took a no hitter into the sixth inning, exiting the game after that inning having held the Yankees to one hit and one unearned run. Overall with the 2020 Red Sox, Houck appeared in three games (all starts), compiling a 3–0 record with 0.53 ERA and 21 strikeouts in 17 innings pitched. Following the 2020 season, Houck was ranked by Baseball America as the Red Sox' number eight prospect.

Houck began the 2021 season on Boston's active roster; he lost one start and made one relief appearance before being optioned to the team's alternate training site on April 7. He was recalled to start one game of a doubleheader against the Chicago White Sox on April 18, taking the loss. Houck was again recalled by the Red Sox on July 16, earning his first major-league save that evening, pitching the final three innings of a 4–0 win over the Yankees in The Bronx. He was optioned to and recalled from the Triple-A Worcester Red Sox several times during July and August. Overall during the regular season, Houck made 18 appearances (13 starts) for Boston, compiling a 1–5 record with 3.52 ERA; he struck out 87 batters in 69 innings.

Houck began the 2022 season in the Red Sox' starting rotation. He was placed on the restricted list prior to a late April series in Toronto, as he was apparently not vaccinated against COVID-19 (required to enter Canada), causing him to miss a start. He re-joined the team on April 29 in Baltimore. Houck was again placed on the restricted list in late June when the Red Sox played another series to Toronto. On August 9, Houck was placed on the injured list due to lower-back inflammation. On September 3, Red Sox manager Alex Cora announced that Houck would have season-ending back surgery. In 32 appearances (four starts) during 2022, Houck recorded a 5–4 record with eight saves and a 3.15 ERA while striking out 56 batters in 60 innings pitched.

Houck returned to the starting rotation for 2023. On June 16, he was struck by a line drive in a home game against the Yankees, and was subsequently placed on the injured list with a facial fracture. He returned to Boston's active roster on August 22. For the season, Houck posted a 6–10 record with a 5.01 ERA; he struck out 99 batters in 106 innings.

==== 2024–present ====
On April 17, 2024, Houck threw a "Maddux" against the Cleveland Guardians, completing his first complete game shutout in 94 pitches. At 1 hour 49 minutes, it was the shortest nine–inning game since Armando Galarraga's near-perfect game in 2010. The contest was also the first complete-game shutout for the Red Sox since Michael Wacha on June 6, 2022, and the last Maddux for Boston since Clay Buchholz in 2014. Houck continued to impress through the season, and was named to the 2024 All-Star Game. Houck pitched the third inning for the victorious American League, allowing the only runs the National League scored (three, on four hits) while striking out one. After the All-Star Game, Houck struggled to replicate his first-half statistics. He only pitched into the seventh inning once, going 1–4 with a 4.23 ERA in 11 starts after the Midsummer Classic. Houck finished the season with a 9–10 record along with a career-best 3.12 ERA. He also cruised to career-highs in innings pitched and strikeouts, with 178 2/3 and 154, respectively, and started 30 games.

Houck began the 2025 season with high expectations as the number-two starter, behind recently acquired ace Garrett Crochet. However, Houck struggled. In his first start, he went 5 2/3 innings, letting up four runs on seven hits. On April 15, Houck allowed 12 runs (11 earned) in 2 1/3 innings against the Tampa Bay Rays; no pitcher in franchise history had allowed 11 earned runs in as few as 2 1/3 innings. He also became the first Red Sox pitcher to allow 12 runs in a game since Galen Cisco in 1962. Although Houck showed signs of improvement afterwards, including a seven inning, six strikeout performance against the Toronto Blue Jays, he soon again struggled. On May 12, Houck allowed 11 earned runs against the Detroit Tigers, again in 2 1/3 innings. With the outing, Houck became the first Red Sox pitcher since Wes Ferrell in 1936 to let up 10 or more earned runs in multiple appearances in a season. Houck was placed on the 60-day injured list on July 31, following a failed rehab assignment due to a right flexor pronator strain. On August 2, it was revealed that Houck would need Tommy John surgery. He ended his season with an 0–3 record with 32 strikeouts and an ERA of 8.04. On August 18, the Red Sox announced that Houck had successfully undergone "hybrid reconstruction of his right UCL with a flexor tendon repair." On February 10, 2026, Houck was transferred to the 60-day injured list.

Houck started progressing throughout the 2026 season, and made multiple rehab starts in September of that year. On September 27, 2026, Houck was reinstated from the 60-day injured list, and was set to start the final game of the Red Sox season against the Chicago Cubs. In his return, Houck pitched three innings, giving up three runs on four hits, two of them home runs, but didn't issue any walks and struck a batter out. It was his first major league start in 503 days.

== International career ==
In the summer of 2015, Houck played for the United States collegiate national team. Against Cuba, Houck, A. J. Puk, and Ryan Hendrix combined to throw a no-hitter.

In October 2019, Houck was selected for the United States national baseball team for the 2019 WBSC Premier12 tournament.
