= Noel Argüelles =

Cuban baseball player

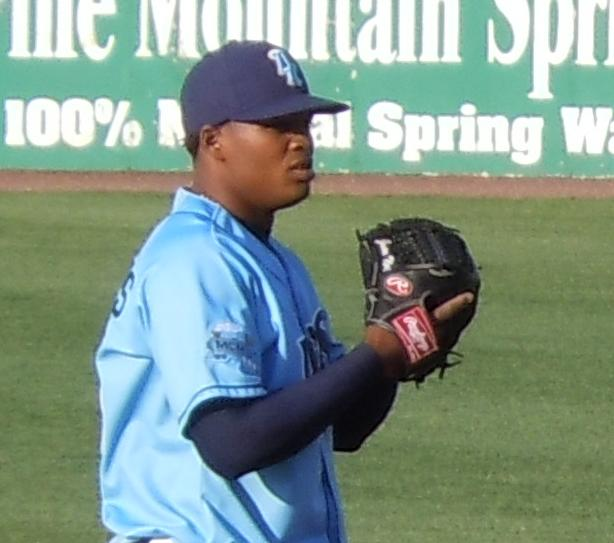
- Pitcher
- Born: January 12, 1990 (age 36); Güira, Cuba
- Bats: Left Throws: Left
- Stats at Baseball Reference

Noel Argüelles (Spanish pronunciation: [aɾˈɣweʎes]; born January 12, 1990) is a Cuban former professional baseball pitcher.

With shortstop José Iglesias, Argüelles defected from the Cuban junior national team while in Canada. Argüelles signed a major-league contract with the Kansas City Royals in December 2009.

After he signed, Argüelles developed shoulder pain that prevented him from pitching in 2010 and necessitated shoulder surgery in August 2010. He debuted in the Royals organization for the Class A Wilmington Blue Rocks in 2011. After struggling with the Northwest Arkansas Naturals of the Double-A Texas League in 2013, the Royals outrighted Argüelles off of their 40-man roster.

On April 27, 2016, Arguelles signed a minor league deal with the Washington Nationals. He last pitched professionally for the independent Joplin Blasters during the 2016 season.

In four seasons pitching in Minor League Baseball, Argüelles compiled a 10–30 win–loss record with a 5.47 earned run average (ERA).

== See also ==
- List of baseball players who defected from Cuba
