= Teoscar Hernández =

Dominican baseball player (born 1992)

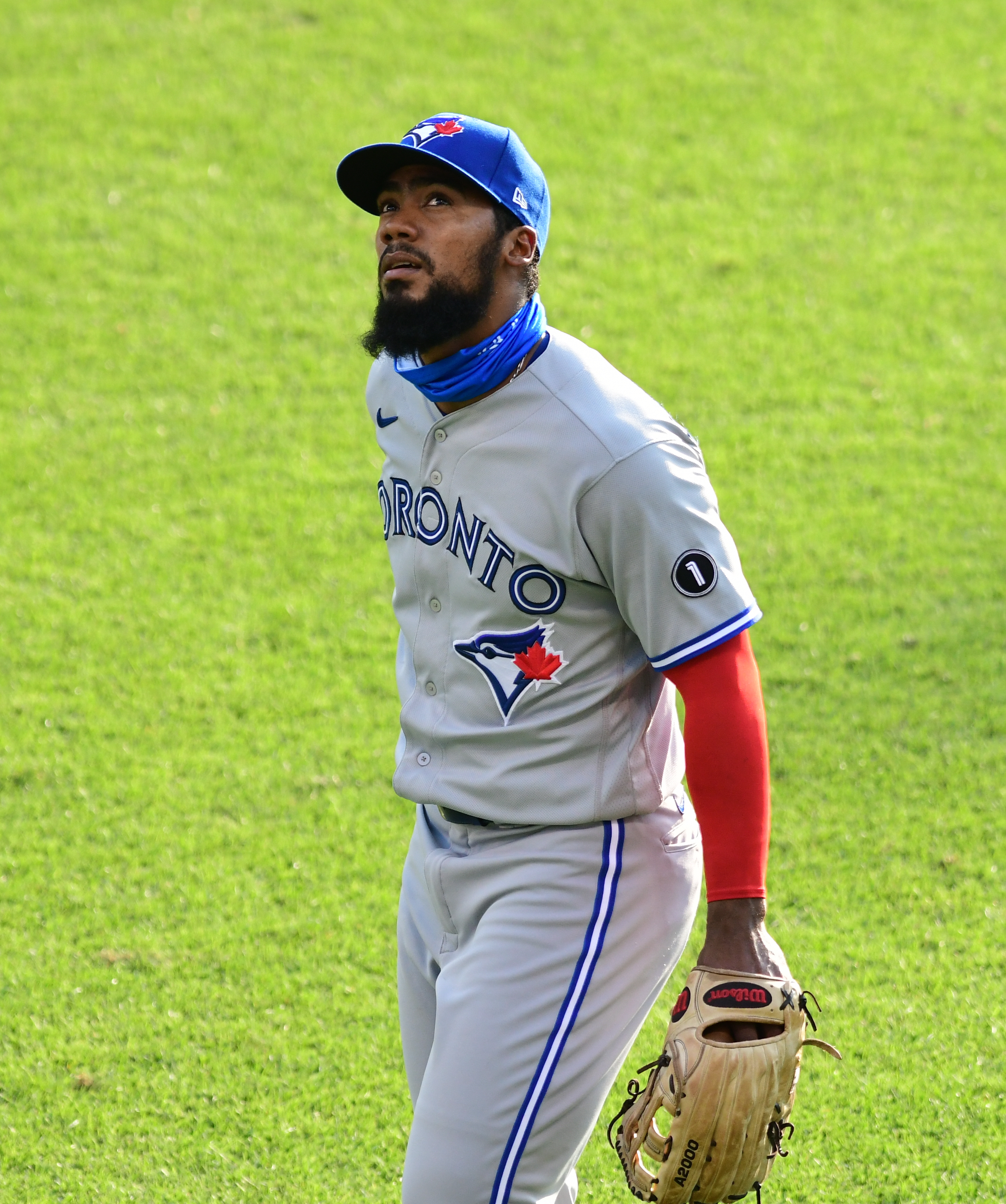
- Hernández with the Toronto Blue Jays in 2020

Los Angeles Dodgers – No. 37
- Outfielder
- Born: October 15, 1992 (age 34); Cotuí, Sánchez Ramírez, Dominican Republic
- Bats: Right Throws: Right

MLB debut
- August 12, 2016, for the Houston Astros

MLB statistics (through 2026 season)
- Batting average: .261
- Home runs: 233
- Runs batted in: 725
- Stats at Baseball Reference

Teams
- Houston Astros (2016–2017); Toronto Blue Jays (2017–2022); Seattle Mariners (2023); Los Angeles Dodgers (2024–present)

Career highlights and awards
- 2× All-Star (2021, 2024); 2× World Series champion (2024, 2025); 2× All-MLB Second Team (2021, 2024); 3× Silver Slugger Award (2020, 2021, 2024)

Teoscar José Hernández (Spanish pronunciation: [teˈoskaɾ xoˈse eɾˈnandes]; born October 15, 1992), nicknamed "Teo", is a Dominican professional baseball outfielder for the Los Angeles Dodgers of Major League Baseball (MLB). He has previously played in MLB for the Houston Astros, Toronto Blue Jays, and Seattle Mariners. Hernández made his MLB debut in 2016 with the Astros. He has won three Silver Slugger Awards and was an All-Star in 2021 and 2024. With the Dodgers, he won the 2024 and 2025 World Series.

== Professional career ==
=== Houston Astros ===
==== Minor leagues (2011–2016) ====
Hernández signed with the Houston Astros as an international free agent in February 2011. He made his professional debut that season for the Dominican Summer League Astros, where he was named the team's MVP. In 2012, Hernández played with the Rookie-level Gulf Coast Astros and Single-A Lexington Legends. He appeared in 59 total games between the two affiliates, and recorded a .243 batting average, five home runs, 23 runs batted in (RBI), and 11 stolen bases. Hernández played the entire 2013 season with the Single-A Quad City River Bandits, and hit .271 with 13 home runs, 55 RBI, and 24 stolen bases. During the offseason, Hernández appeared in 23 games for the Toros del Este of the Dominican Winter League.

Hernández started 2014 with the Lancaster JetHawks of the High-A California League, and was promoted to the Corpus Christi Hooks of the Double-A Texas League during the season. In 119 games, Hernández hit .292 with 21 home runs, 85 RBI, and 33 stolen bases.

Hernández played the entire 2015 season with Double-A Corpus Christi, batting .219 with 17 home runs, 48 RBI, and 33 stolen bases in 119 games. He began the 2016 season with Corpus Christi, and was promoted to the Fresno Grizzlies of the Triple-A Pacific Coast League in late June.

==== Major leagues (2016–2017) ====
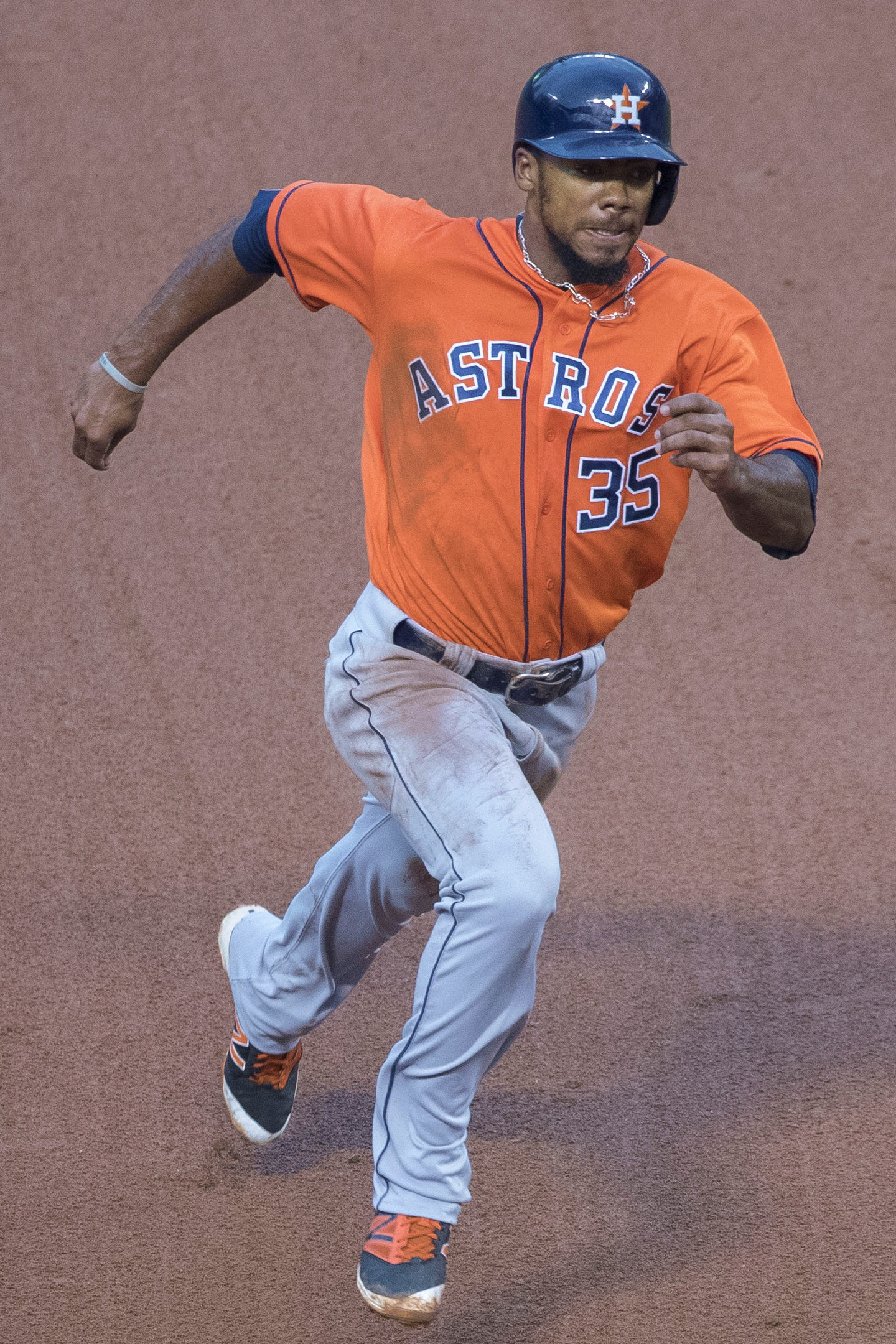
Hernández with the Astros in 2016

On August 12, 2016, the Astros promoted Hernández to the major leagues, and he made his MLB debut as the starting center fielder against the Toronto Blue Jays that day, recording two hits in four at-bats. His first big league hit was a home run off of Francisco Liriano in the sixth inning. He remained with the Astros through the end of the 2016 season and hit .230 with four home runs and 11 RBI in 41 games. In the minors that year, he batted .307 in 107 games, with 10 home runs, 53 RBI, and 34 stolen bases.

Hernández was optioned to Triple-A Fresno to begin the 2017 season but was recalled on April 25 to replace an injured Jake Marisnick. However, he was injured in a collision with teammate Jose Altuve in his first game and went on the disabled list.

=== Toronto Blue Jays ===
==== 2017–2019 ====
On July 31, 2017, the Astros traded Hernández and Nori Aoki to the Toronto Blue Jays for Francisco Liriano. He was assigned to the Triple-A Buffalo Bisons and joined the Blue Jays on September 1. On September 10, Hernández hit two home runs against the Detroit Tigers, the first multi home run game of his career. In 26 games played, Hernández hit .261 with eight home runs and 20 RBIs.

Hernández started the 2018 season with Buffalo and was recalled on April 13 when Josh Donaldson was placed on the disabled list. Though he struggled defensively in left field during his first full major league season, Hernández emerged as one of Toronto's top offensive players, slugging 51 extra-base hits in his first 100 games. In 134 games for the Blue Jays, he hit .239 with 22 home runs. He struggled through the first two months of the season in 2019, hitting .189 with three home runs. He was optioned to Triple-A on May 16 for two weeks and returned to the major league team to play center field, finishing the season with a .230 batting average and 26 home runs in 125 games.

==== 2020–2022: Silver Sluggers, All-Star ====
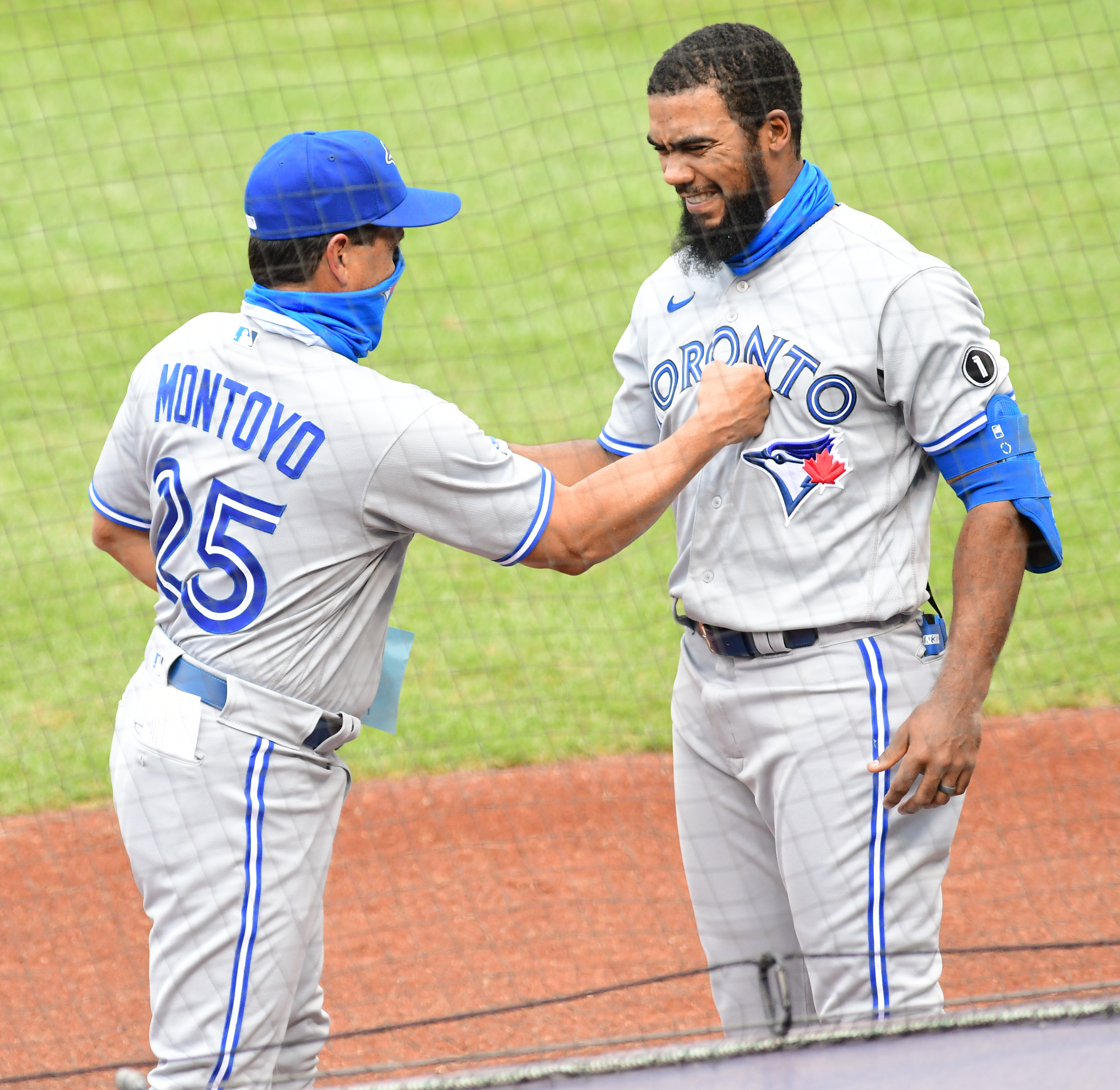
Hernández (right) and Blue Jays manager Charlie Montoyo in 2020.

With the Blue Jays in 2020, Hernández batted .289 with 16 home runs and 34 RBIs in 50 games, winning the American League (AL) Silver Slugger Award for right field in the shortened season and having the fourth-best rate of at-bats per home run in the league. He also made his postseason debut, getting one hit in seven at-bats for the Blue Jays in the Wild Card Series.

In 2021, Hernández started for the AL in the All-Star Game, his first All-Star selection, and finished the season batting .296 with 32 home runs, and a career-high 116 RBIs. He also won a Silver Slugger award for the second year in a row.

On March 22, 2022, Hernández signed a $10.65 million contract with the Blue Jays, avoiding salary arbitration. He hit .267 with 25 home runs and 77 RBI during the season and hit two home runs for the Blue Jays in the second game of the Wild Card Series, which the Jays lost to the Seattle Mariners.

=== Seattle Mariners (2023) ===
On November 16, 2022, the Blue Jays traded Hernández to the Mariners for pitchers Erik Swanson and Adam Macko. He lost his salary arbitration case and received a one-year, $14 million contract on February 18, 2023, after seeking $16.5 million. Hernández played in 160 games for Seattle in 2023, hitting .258 with 26 homers and 93 RBI. His 211 strikeouts were second-most in the AL, three fewer than teammate Eugenio Suárez. Hernández hit noticeably worse at T-Mobile Park and said he struggled with the batter's eye at Seattle's home stadium. He elected free agency on November 2.

=== Los Angeles Dodgers ===
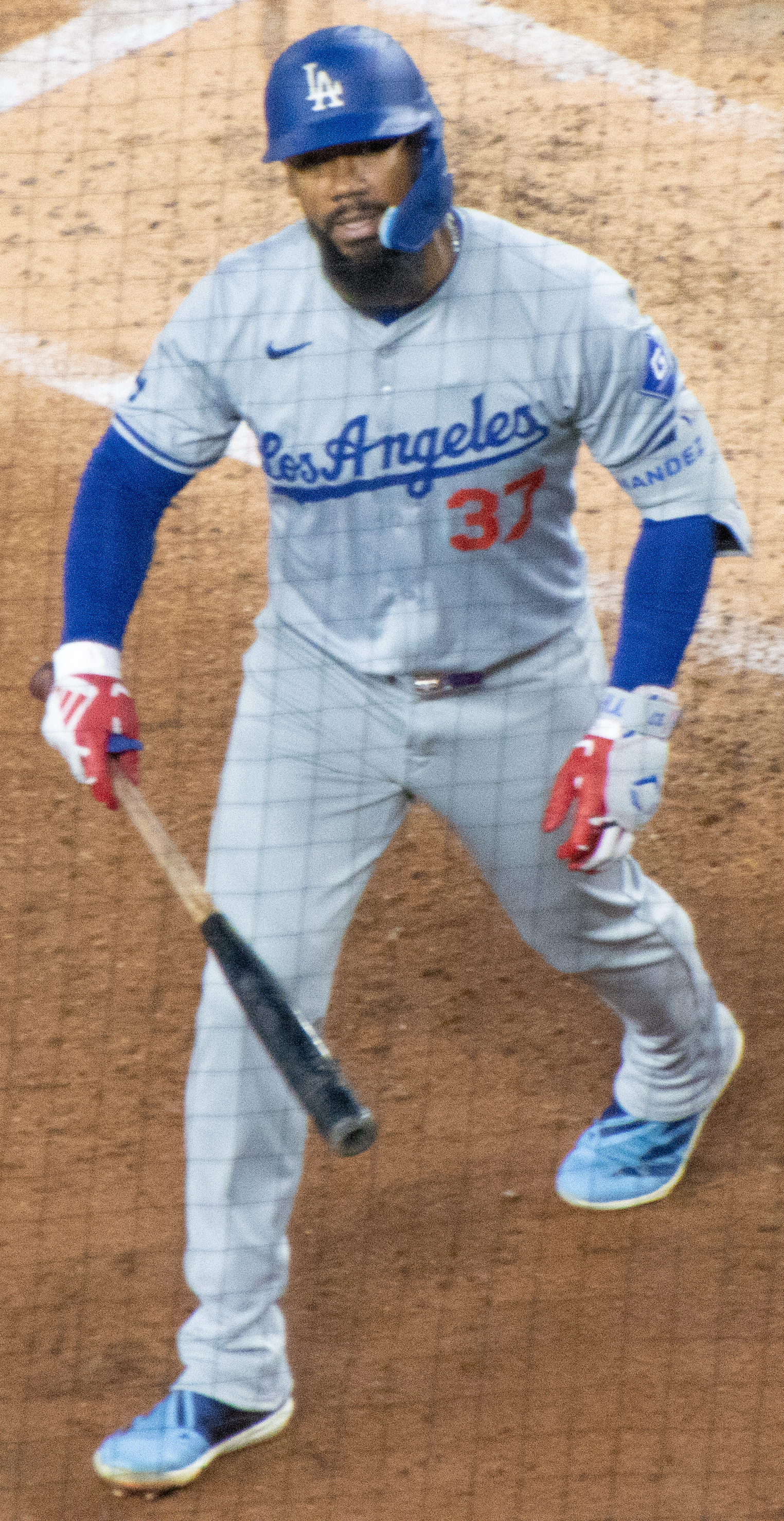
Hernández with the Dodgers in 2024.

On January 12, 2024, Hernández signed a one-year, $23.5 million contract with the Los Angeles Dodgers. He won the National League (NL) Player of the Week Award for the week of June 3–9 after he was 9 for 25 with four home runs, three doubles, six runs scored, and 10 RBI during that span. He was selected to the All-Star Game, his second such selection. He won the MLB Home Run Derby, the first Dodger to win the contest. He finished the regular season with a .272 average, a career-high 33 home runs, and 99 RBIs in 154 games.

Hernández hit a grand slam in Game 3 of the NL Division Series (NLDS), a loss to the San Diego Padres. He then hit another home run in Game 5 to help the Dodgers win the series. He had six hits in 18 at-bats in the series with seven RBI. He struggled in the NL Championship Series (NLCS) against the New York Mets, recording two hits in 22 at-bats with one RBI. Hernández hit .350 in the World Series against the New York Yankees with one home run and 4 RBI in five games, including a game-tying two-run double off Gerrit Cole as part of a five-run rally in the 5th inning of the deciding Game 5 as the Dodgers won the series.

On January 3, 2025, Hernández signed a three-year, $66 million contract to remain with the Dodgers. Hernández started his second year with the Dodgers as the right fielder on March 18 against the Chicago Cubs in Tokyo, as part of the MLB Tokyo Series. In the game, Hernández went 1-for-4 with an RBI single in the Dodgers' win. On April 27, he hit his 200th career home run in the bottom of the fifth inning against the Pittsburgh Pirates' Bailey Falter. On July 3, Hernández recorded his 1,000th career hit in the top of the fifth inning against the Chicago White Sox He played in 134 games during the season, with a slash line of .247/.284/.454, his lowest offensive production since 2019. He did hit 25 home runs and drive in 89 RBI. He also struggled defensively at times during the season.

Hernández began the postseason by hitting two home runs in the opening game of the Wild Card Series against the Cincinnati Reds. He had four hits total in the two games. In the NLDS and NLCS combined, he had seven hits in 31 at-bats with two home runs and five RBI. Hernández won his second consecutive championship when the Dodgers beat the Blue Jays in seven games in the World Series. He had seven hits in 29 at-bats with one home run and two RBI in the series.

In the 2026 season, he played in 125 games for the Dodgers with a .267 batting average, 16 home runs and 64 RBI.

== International career ==
Hernández has played for the Dominican Republic in international tournaments. Hernández played in the 2015 WBSC Premier12, getting five hits, including a home run and a double, in 15 at bats. He played for the Dominican Republic in the 2023 World Baseball Classic, batting 0-for-5 over four games with two walks.

== Personal life ==
The name "Teoscar" is a portmanteau of the first three letters of each of his parents' names - Teófilo (father) and Carmen (mother) - with an "S" added in the center.

Hernández and his wife have three sons, one of whom has autism, leading Hernández to advocate for autism awareness.

Hernández is nicknamed "Mr. Seeds" because he regularly throws sunflower seeds at his teammates after they hit home runs. He said in 2024 that he began this celebration in 2017 with the Blue Jays, saying, "We had a bunch (of seeds). So I started throwing and throwing and throwing."

== See also ==
- List of Los Angeles Dodgers team records
- List of Major League Baseball career double plays leaders
- List of Major League Baseball players from the Dominican Republic
- Los Angeles Dodgers award winners and league leaders
- Toronto Blue Jays award winners and league leaders
