= José Ramírez (third baseman) =

Dominican baseball player (born 1992)

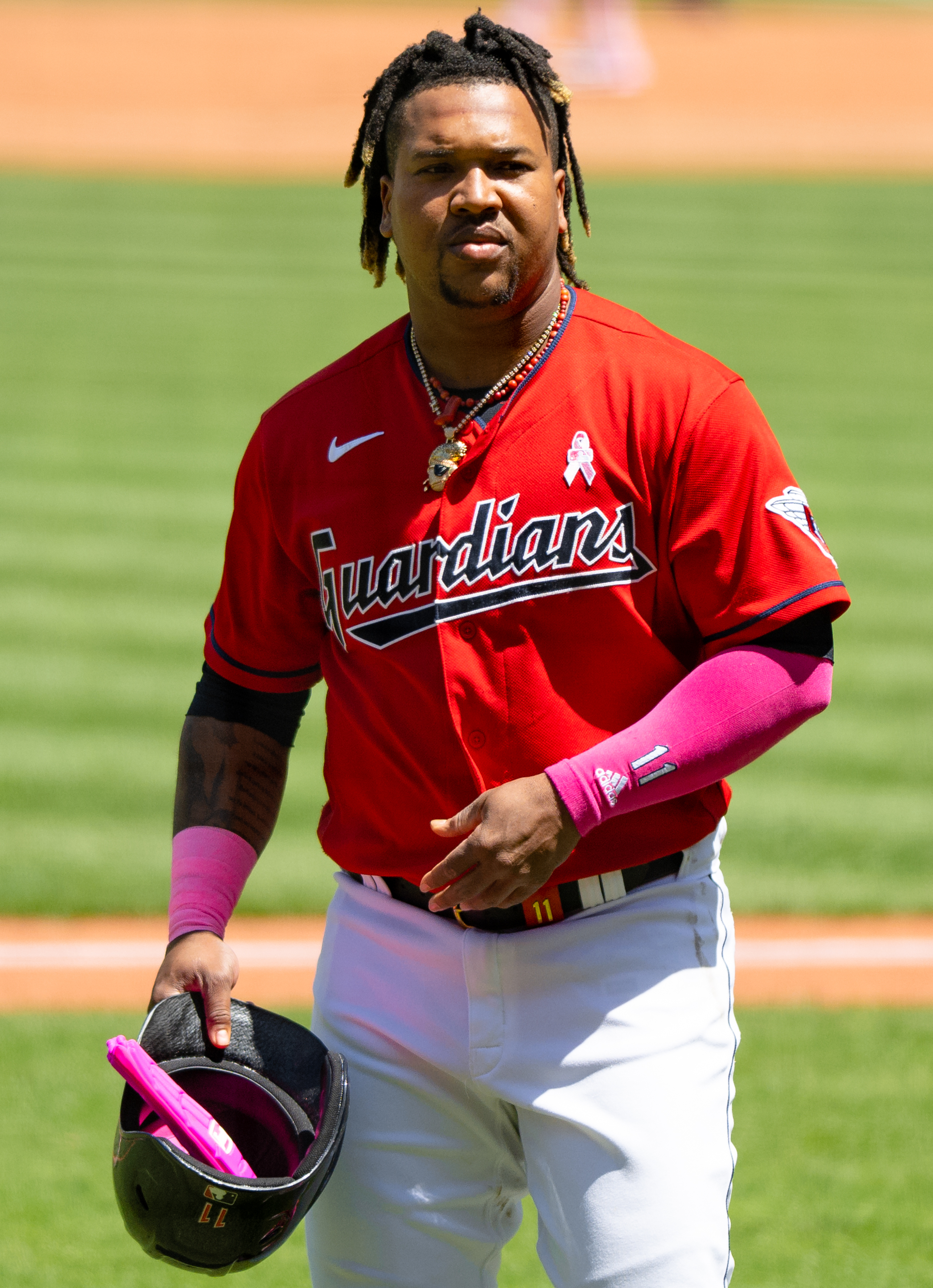
- Ramírez with the Cleveland Guardians in 2023

Cleveland Guardians – No. 11
- Third baseman
- Born: September 17, 1992 (age 34); Baní, Dominican Republic
- Bats: Switch Throws: Right

MLB debut
- September 1, 2013, for the Cleveland Indians

MLB statistics (through 2026 season)
- Batting average: .276
- Hits: 1,779
- Home runs: 297
- Runs batted in: 1,002
- Stolen bases: 324
- Stats at Baseball Reference

Teams
- Cleveland Indians / Guardians (2013–present)

Career highlights and awards
- 7× All-Star (2017, 2018, 2021–2025); 2× All-MLB First Team (2024, 2025); 6× Silver Slugger Award (2017, 2018, 2020, 2022, 2024, 2025)

José Enrique Ramírez Mateo (born September 17, 1992) is a Dominican professional baseball third baseman for the Cleveland Guardians of Major League Baseball (MLB). He signed with the Cleveland Indians as an international free agent in 2009, and made his MLB debut in 2013.

Ramírez is a seven-time All-Star selection, a six-time Silver Slugger Award award winner, and a three-time selectee to the All-MLB Team. In 2016, he helped lead the Indians to the World Series, hitting .310 (9-for-31) in the series, which the Indians ultimately lost in 7 games to the Chicago Cubs. In 2017, he led the major leagues in doubles. In 2018, Ramírez hit 39 home runs and stole 34 bases to join the 30–30 club. In 2025, he became the first Cleveland player to have 250 home runs and 250 stolen bases; the 24th player to achieve the mark in MLB history, and the first primary third baseman to do so.

== Early life ==
Ramírez grew up in poverty in Baní, Dominican Republic. He is the first-born son of Silveria Mateo and Sito Ramírez.

He says that by the age of 13, he was already playing in a league for adults. He looked up to MVP Miguel Tejada, who also grew up in Baní and often returned to do philanthropic work, a legacy Ramírez would grow up to continue. There is now an all-turf field, donated by Ramírez and the Cleveland Guardians, located near Ramírez's childhood home that bears his name.

As a teenager, Ramírez played baseball in the Dominican Prospect League. In 2009, at the age of 17, Ramírez and other unsigned prospects traveled to the Cleveland Indians' Dominican facility in Boca Chica, where an Indians scout, Ramon Peña, noticed the oft-overlooked Ramírez when Ramírez racked up 11 hits in four games across three days.

He signed with the Indians, receiving a $50,000 signing bonus.

== Career ==
=== Cleveland Indians / Guardians ===
Ramírez sat out the 2010 season and made his professional debut in 2011 with the Arizona Indians of the Rookie-level Arizona League. He batted .325 in 48 games played. He then played for the Toros del Este of the Dominican Winter League. In 2012, he played for the Mahoning Valley Scrappers of the Class A-Short Season New York-Penn League and Lake County Captains of the Class A Midwest League. The next year, he started the season with the Akron Aeros of the Double-A Eastern League.

==== 2013—2015: Early major league career ====
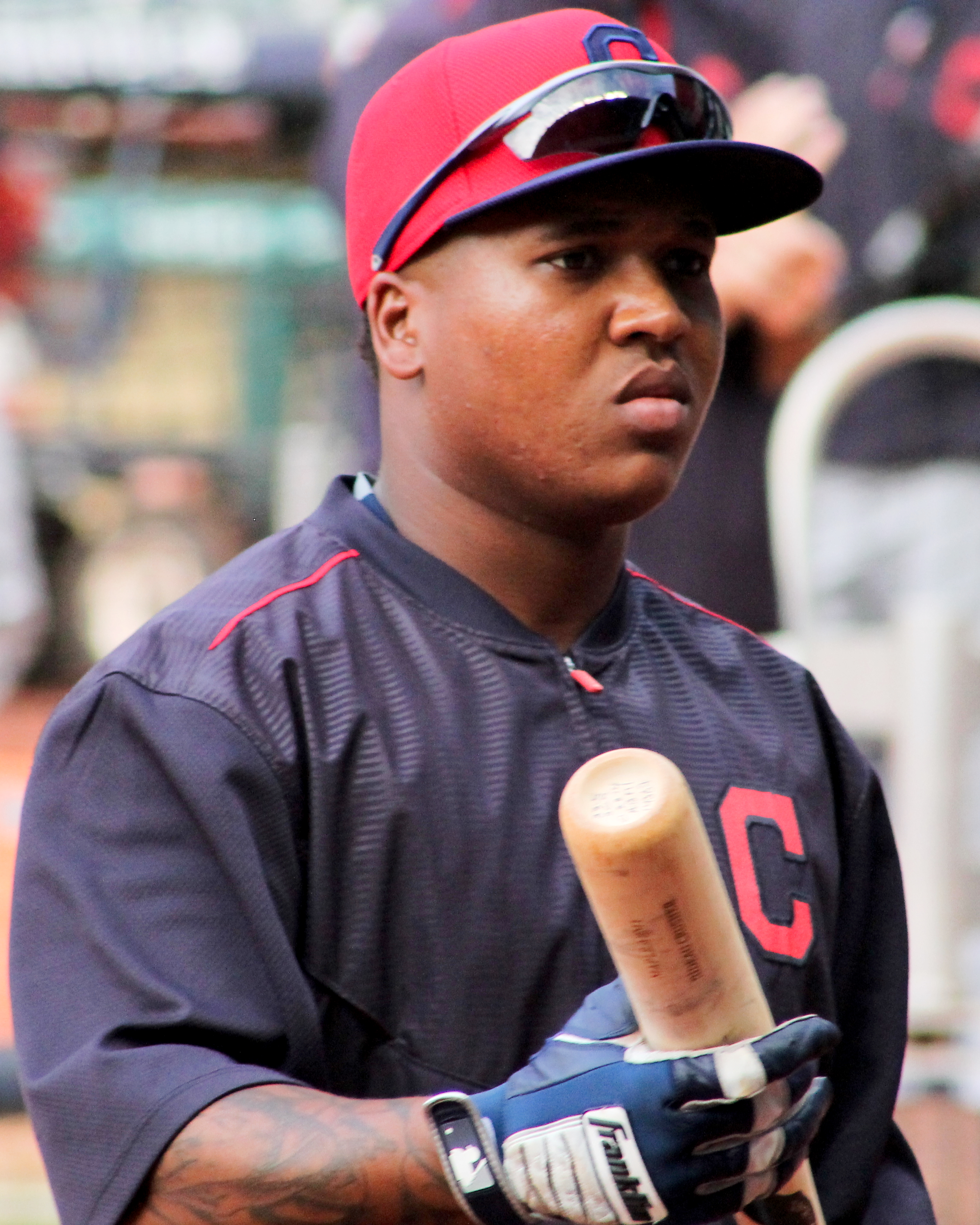
Ramírez with the Indians in 2015

The Indians promoted Ramírez to the major leagues on September 1, 2013, and he made his MLB debut that day. He entered the game as a pinch runner during the ninth inning and scored on Mike Avilés' game-winning grand slam. Ramírez recorded his first major league hit on September 9 against the Kansas City Royals, when he lined a single to left field off of Royals starter Ervin Santana during the third inning. Later in that same game, Ramírez also collected his first multiple-hit game in the major leagues, working a single off reliever Wade Davis during the seventh inning.

Ramírez began the 2014 season in the minor leagues and had a batting line of .319/.363/.484 in 105 plate appearances. He was promoted to the major leagues on May 1, as second baseman Jason Kipnis went on the disabled list. Ramírez was sent back to the minors on May 20 after Kipnis was reinstated. However, Ramírez was recalled before July 23.

Ramírez began to get regular playing time at shortstop on July 31, after the Indians traded shortstop Asdrúbal Cabrera. He hit his first home run on August 9 in his first career three-hit game. Ramírez finished the 2014 season by hitting .262 in 237 at-bats. He compiled 62 hits and also had 10 steals, tied for fourth-most on the team.

In 2015, Ramírez made his first Opening Day roster and started on Opening Day, batting ninth and playing shortstop. He also started the Indians' home opener on April 10. Ramírez went 1-for-4 in the team's first game at newly renovated Progressive Field.

Ramírez and the Indians struggled during the first half of the 2015 season. The team fell to last place in the AL Central during June, and Ramírez was sent down to the Triple-A Columbus Clippers of the International League during that span. After being called back up for the second time on August 3, Ramírez would play much better, hitting .250 over the second half of the season. He closed out the season by hitting .280 in September and October with 21 hits. He also had a power surge in September, hitting four home runs, setting his career high for home runs in one month.

==== 2016: World Series appearance ====
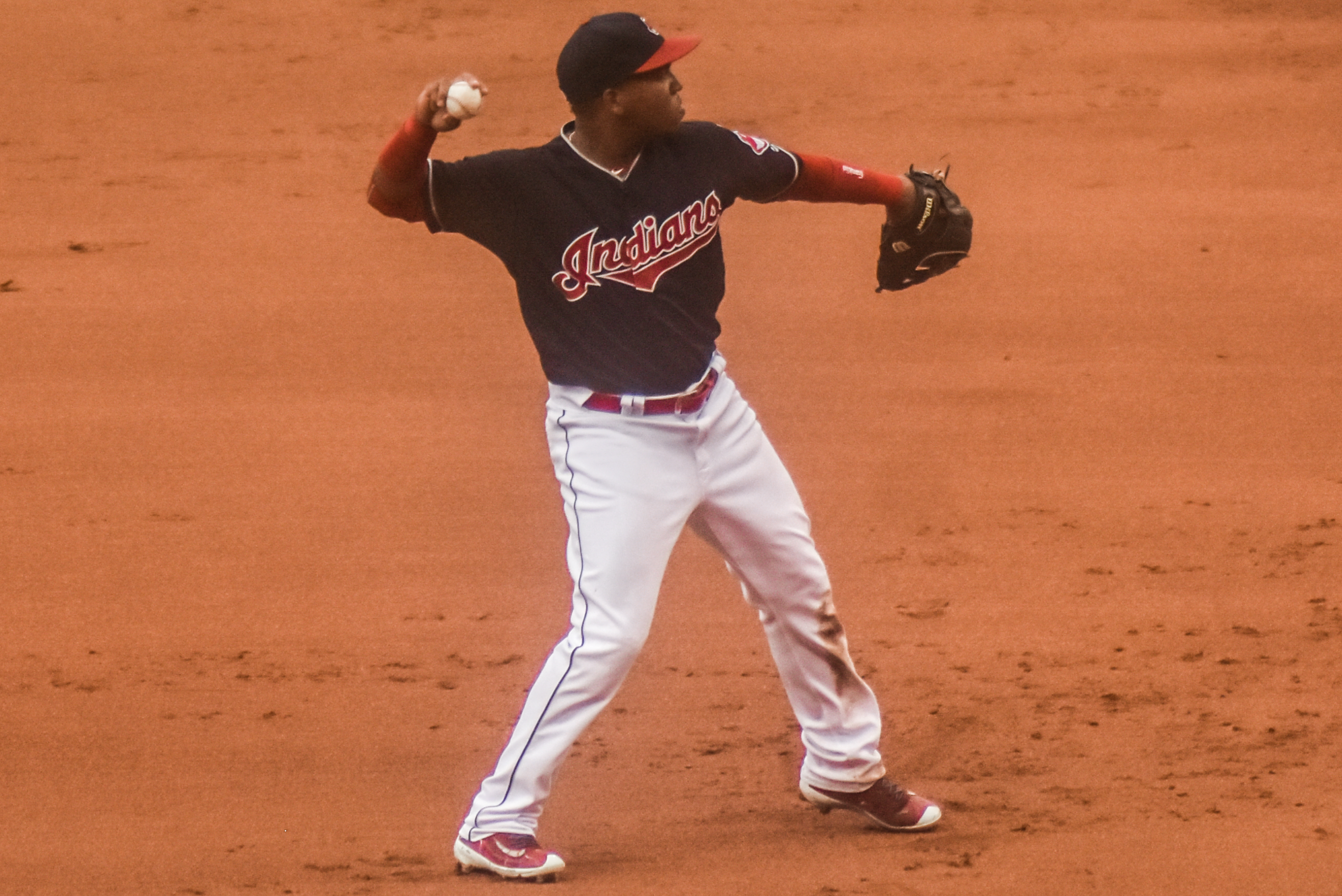
Ramírez in 2016

In 2016, Ramírez hit .312/.363/.462. He became the first player during 2016 to hit in every spot in the lineup when he batted fourth on June 28. Ramírez had also played four positions this year: second base, third base, shortstop, and left field. When asked about Ramírez's play, Indians hitting coach Ty Van Burkleo noted that Ramírez "has done a great job all year." He also concluded that with the Indians missing Michael Brantley, Ramírez has really stepped up in the heart of their batting order and has "been a real shot in the arm" for the organization.

On June 19, Ramírez hit a walk-off single in the 10th inning against the Chicago White Sox, which gave Cleveland a 3–2 win. That win was the third of 14 straight wins, at the time a franchise record. Their 14 straight wins from June 17 to July 1 was also the longest winning streak in the majors since 2013. During the streak, Ramírez batted .298 with 17 hits and nine RBIs. On July 14, Ramírez was third in the American League with a .377 batting average with runners in scoring position. On September 17, his 24th birthday, he hit a walk-off single in the bottom of the 10th inning to give the Indians a 1–0 victory over the Detroit Tigers. He finished the season having established then career-highs of a .312 batting average, 46 doubles, 11 home runs, 76 RBIs, 22 stolen bases, and 4.8 Wins Above Replacement (WAR), per Baseball Reference.

In the fifth game of the World Series, Ramírez hit a home run, giving Cleveland a 1–0 lead over the Chicago Cubs. He hit .310 (9-for-31) in the World Series, with one double, one home run, and one walk. However, the Cubs ultimately prevailed, with Cleveland falling one run short in Game 7 in a bid for their first championship since 1948.

The Cleveland chapter of the Baseball Writers' Association of America (BBWAA) selected Ramírez as the Bob Feller Man of the Year Award winner, the equivalent of the club's Most Valuable Player (MVP) Award. He also received consideration for the AL MVP for the first time, placing 17th.

==== 2017: Silver Slugger Award ====
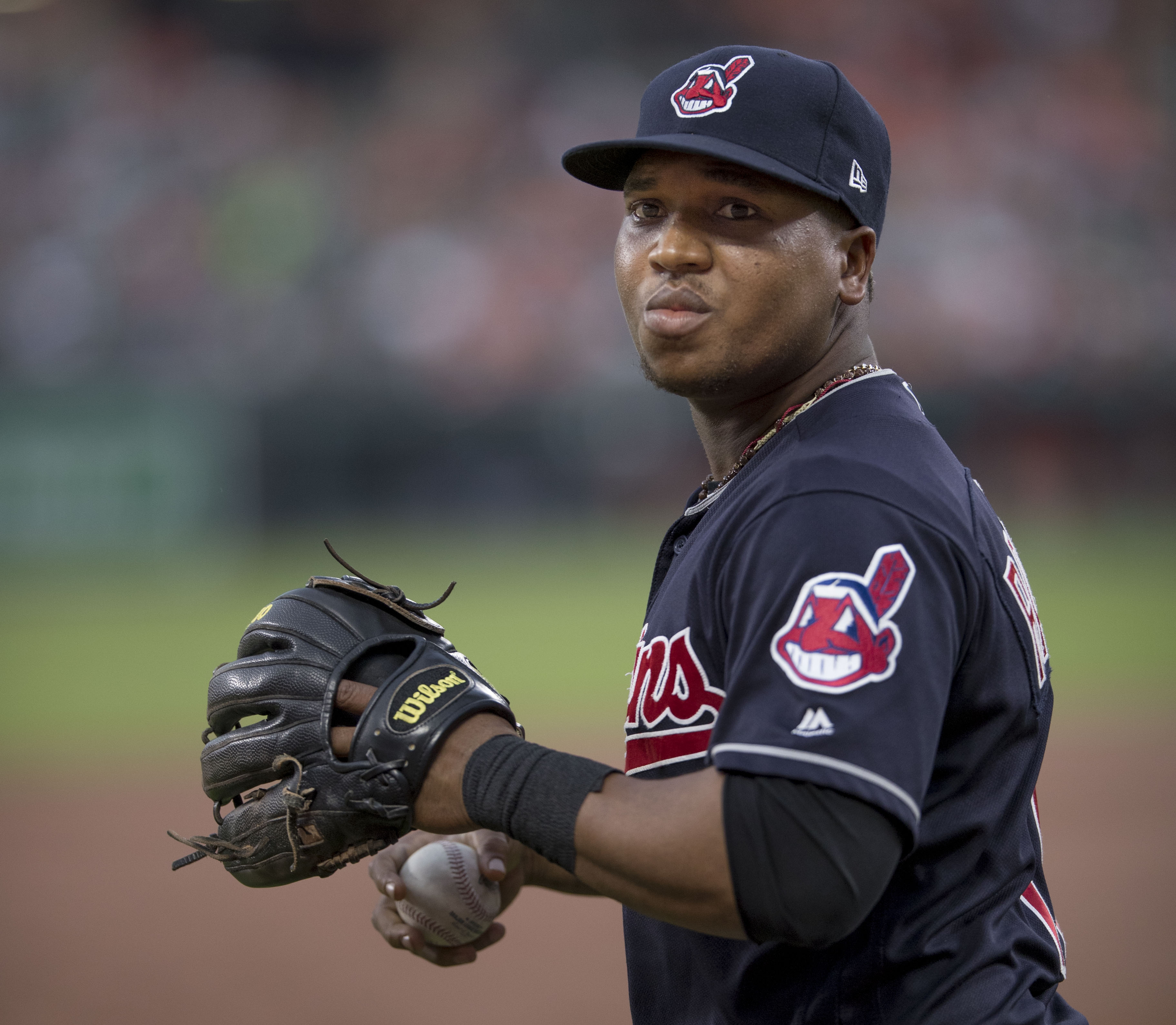
Ramírez in 2017

On March 28, 2017, Ramírez signed a five-year contract extension worth $26 million. In June, he collected nine consecutive multi-hit games, the longest such streak for an Indians player since Roy Hughes in 1936. He was named AL Player of the Week for the first time in his career on June 18, after batting .516 with 16 hits, three home runs, seven RBIs, and a stolen base. He raised his average from .265 to .320 over his previous 22 games. When Jason Kipnis sustained a hamstring injury on July 9 that required a stint on the 10-day DL, Ramírez moved to second base to replace Kipnis for much of the remainder of the season. Ramírez was selected by fan voting as the starting third baseman for the American League in the MLB All-Star Game.

On September 3 versus the Detroit Tigers, Ramírez tied a major league record with five extra-base hits, three doubles and two home runs. Incidentally, both home runs received "help", as both were catchable. For the first home run, Mikie Mahtook pushed the ball over the fence with his bare hand. On the second, the ball bounced off Alex Presley's glove and touched the yellow stripe of the fence for a home run. That game was also the 11th of a 22-game win streak spanning August 24−September 15, which surpassed the 2002 Oakland Athletics' 20 consecutive wins for the American League record, and was the second longest all-time to the New York Giants' 26 consecutive in 1916. In that streak, Ramírez made the strongest offensive contribution, batting .423/.462/.944. He was named AL Player of the Week on September 5.

In 152 games played in 2017, Ramirez finished with an MLB-leading 56 doubles, a .318 batting average, .957 on-base plus slugging (OPS), 29 home runs, 83 RBIs, and 107 runs scored. He had 91 extra base hits, the second-highest total in one season for a switch hitter in major league history. He became just the 19th player to hit at least 56 doubles in one season. His .957 OPS is the highest ever in one season for a player who made at least 60 appearances at both second base and third base. Of the 74 major league batters to hit at least 25 home runs, Ramírez struck out the fewest times (69).

End of season awards for Ramírez included selection as designated hitter on Baseball America's All-MLB Team, and his first career Silver Slugger Award, as the top-hitting AL third baseman. He was one of three Gold Glove Award finalists at third base. He placed third in the AL Most Valuable Player Award voting, behind winner Jose Altuve and Aaron Judge.

==== 2018: 30–30 club ====
On May 29, 2018, Ramírez hit his 17th home run of the season in a 9–1 victory versus the White Sox. He joined Albert Belle as the only hitters in franchise history to have that many home runs before the end of May, and for the month had batted .336, 11 home runs and 25 RBIs. At the end of May, he had 18 home runs, second to Belle in 1996 with 21 home runs for most in franchise history. Additionally, Ramírez and Francisco Lindor became the first Cleveland teammates to both hit at least 10 home runs in one month since Jim Thome and Karim García in 2002.

Slashing .292/.395/.590 with 24 home runs, 59 RBIs, and 19 stolen bases, Ramírez was named the starting third baseman for the AL in the All-Star Game. On September 9 versus the Toronto Blue Jays, he registered his 30th stolen base, in addition to 37 home runs, to join the 30–30 club – the first in the majors since Mike Trout in 2012. Ramírez was the 49th member of this group, and the third Indian to do so, joining Joe Carter (1987) and Grady Sizemore (2008).

For the season, Ramírez batted .270/.387/.552 and led the major leagues in walk-to-strikeout ratio at 1.33. He also led the American League in power-speed number (36.3), and had the highest number of pitches per plate appearance in the major leagues (4.30). He became the first Indians player to achieve 30 home runs, 30 stolen bases, 100 runs scored, and 100 RBIs in the same season. However, he batted .302 before the All-Star break and .218 after. Ramírez batted 2-for-20 (.100) in the American League Division Series, as Cleveland lost to the Houston Astros.

==== 2019 ====
Ramírez began the 2019 season continuing the slump that he endured towards the end of the 2018 season. Throughout 102 games beginning August 18, 2018, he batted .189. He was being pitched with much fewer fastballs that he could drive, resulting in more pop-ups with much weaker overall contact. From Opening Day of 2017 to August 18, 2018, he had pulled 42 fastballs for home runs, leading the major leagues. In the subsequent 102 games, he had hit four. He batted .218 with a .308 OBP and .344 SLG in the first half of the 2019 season.

However, Ramírez experienced a resurgence as the season progressed. On August 15, he hit his first career grand slam in the first inning against the New York Yankees. He hit a two-run home run in his next at-bat as the Indians won, 19–5. After the All-Star break, he was second in MLB with 32 extra-base hits and third with 40 RBIs, when he broke the hamate bone in the right wrist on August 24, requiring surgery. He appeared in 129 games during the season, hitting .255 with 23 home runs, 83 RBIs, and 24 stolen bases.

==== 2020: Silver Slugger Award ====
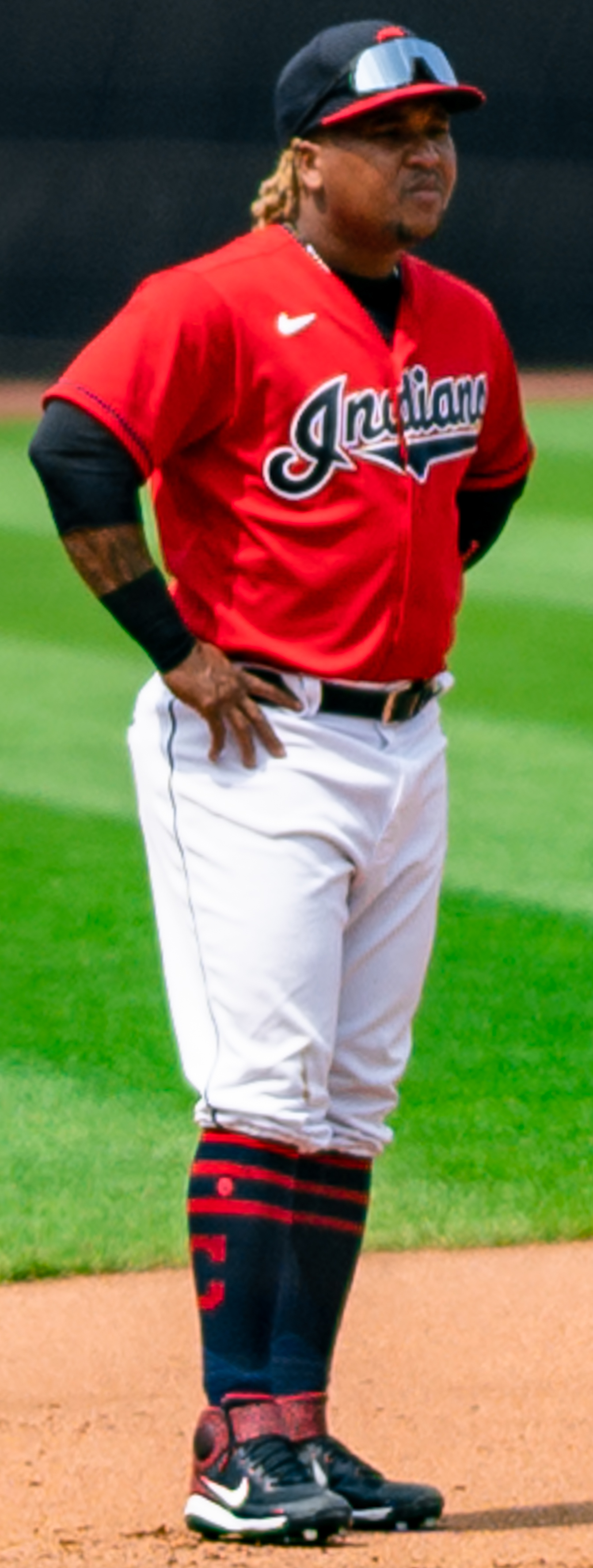
Ramírez in 2020

The 2020 season began slowly for Ramírez as he dealt with a thumb injury. He batted .230 with six doubles, five home runs, and 18 RBIs for the first month. Starting August 25, he batted .358 with 12 home runs and 28 RBIs. Over a seven-game span in September, Ramírez homered six times to help carry the Indians' playoff run following an eight-game losing streak. On September 22, he hit a walk-off home run in the tenth inning to defeat the White Sox 5–3, clinching a playoff berth for Cleveland.

Ramírez garnered the AL Player of the Month Award for September, batting .366/.453/.841 with nine doubles, 10 home runs, 24 RBIs, 1.294 OPS, 19 extra-base hits, and 69 total bases. He led MLB for the month in home runs (tied), OBP, SLG, OPS, total bases (tied), and doubles (tied). He was second in batting average. Each of his last 11 hits in the regular season went for extra bases. He led the club with 17 home runs during the season.

Ramírez concluded the season batting .292, .386 OBP, and career-highs in OPS (.993), slugging percentage (.607), and OPS+ (163). He also tallied 64 hits, 45 runs scored, 16 doubles, 17 home runs, 46 RBIs, 133 total bases, 34 extra-base hits, 31 walks, and ten stolen bases. Per FanGraphs' version of WAR (fWAR), he led the major leagues with 3.4. He also tied for the AL lead in runs scored with Tim Anderson and in extra-base hits with José Abreu, both of the White Sox. Ramírez placed second in OPS and total bases, third in slugging percentage, doubles, home runs, and RBIs, fifth in stolen bases and adjusted OPS+, and tenth in walks. This performance netted Ramírez his third career Silver Slugger Award and a second-place finish to Abreu in the AL MVP voting.

==== 2021: Bob Feller Man of the Year ====
In 2021, Ramírez was selected to the All-Star Game for the third time of his career. At the time of the announcement, he had batted .265 with a .882 OPS, 54 runs scored, 18 doubles, 18 home runs, 50 RBIs, and six stolen bases. His 6.5 fWAR and 138 wRC+ both ranked second among AL third baseman behind Rafael Devers of the Red Sox. Ramírez produced the highest batted ball pull percentage in the major leagues, at 56.8%. He was chosen as the winner of Bob Feller Man of the Year Award, the second of his career.

The Indians exercised the club option on Ramírez's contract for the 2022 season on November 5, 2021.

==== 2022: Contract extension ====
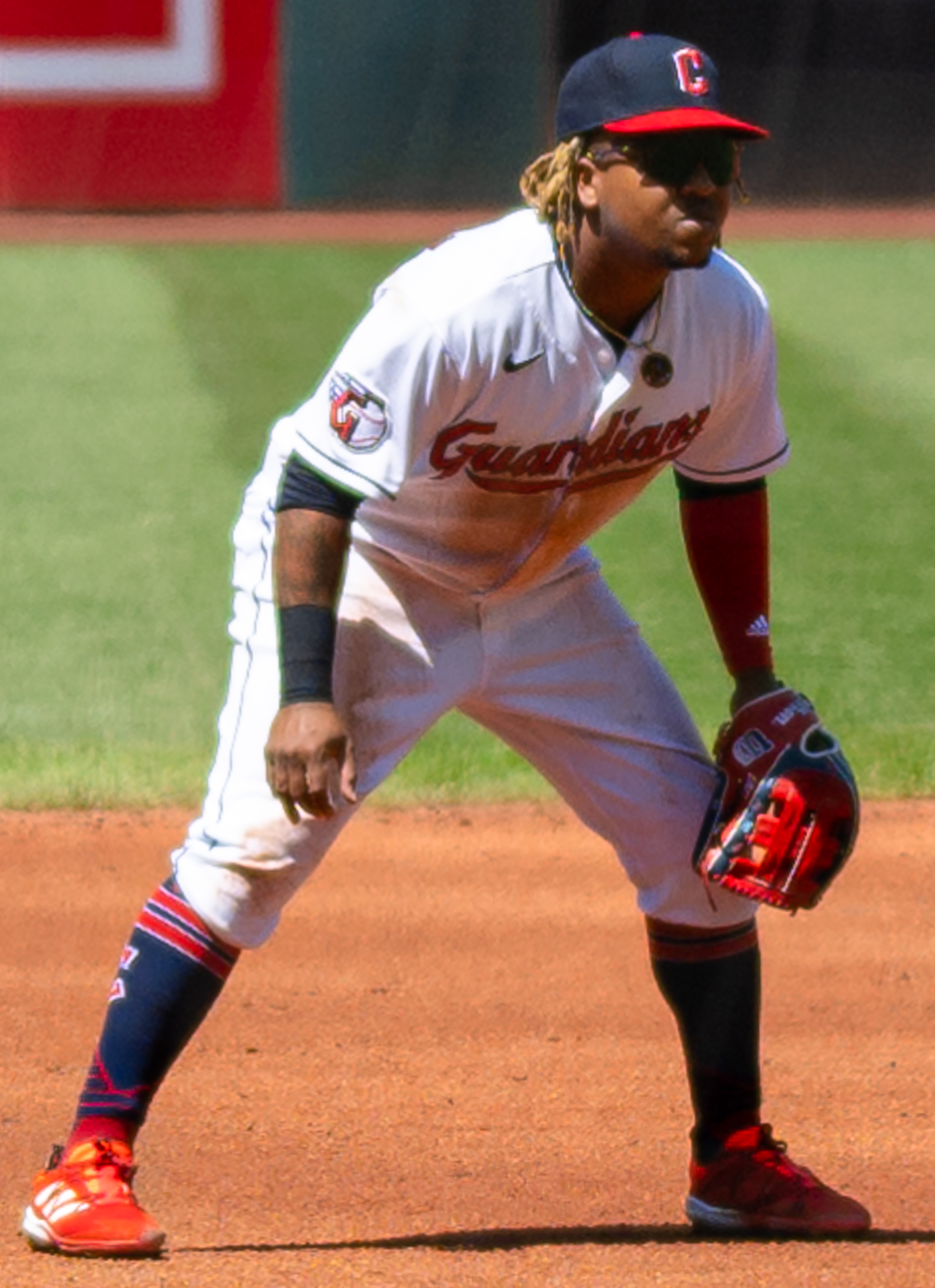
Ramírez in 2022

On April 6, 2022, Ramírez signed a 5-year, $124 million extension with the Cleveland Guardians. Combined with the extension he signed in November 2021, Ramírez was now guaranteed nearly $150 million through 2028. The largest contract awarded in franchise history, the deal also included a full no-trade clause.

In Cleveland's home opener, Ramírez doubled in the ninth inning of a 4–1 defeat to the San Francisco Giants for his 1,000th career hit. He won AL Player of the Month Award for April, having hit .342 with a .722 slugging percentage, 12 runs scored, seven doubles, a triple, seven home runs, 28 RBIs, and nine walks in 21 games. That month, he also reached the career milestone of 1,000 games played. On May 28 versus Detroit, Ramírez homered, tripled, and drove in five runs, amounting to an MLB-leading 48 RBIs through the Guardians' first 42 games, tied for third-most in club history through the end of May. Of all in franchise history, only Manny Ramirez (56 in 1999), Al Rosen (49 in 1954) and Earl Averill (also 48) had equaled or surpassed José Ramírez. He was named AL Player of the Week for the May 24–30, with three home runs, three stolen bases, 11 RBIs, seven total extra base hits, .348/.423/.957, three walks, and one strikeout.

In 2022, he led the major leagues with 44 doubles and 20 intentional walks, batting .280/.355/.514 with 29 home runs and 126 RBIs across 685 plate appearances.

==== 2023 ====
On June 8, Ramírez notched his first career three-home run game against the Red Sox. On August 5, Ramírez and Chicago White Sox shortstop Tim Anderson instigated a bench-clearing brawl after Anderson applied a tag to Ramírez, where Ramírez would wind up knocking Anderson to the ground with a right hook. After the game, Ramírez said that Anderson had been "disrespecting the game for a while now". Ramírez was ejected from the game and suspended for three games. After an appeal, his suspension was reduced to two games.

In 2023, he batted .282/.356/.475, led the AL in intentional walks (22) and was second in the AL behind Alex Bregman in walk-to-strikeout ratio (1.00).

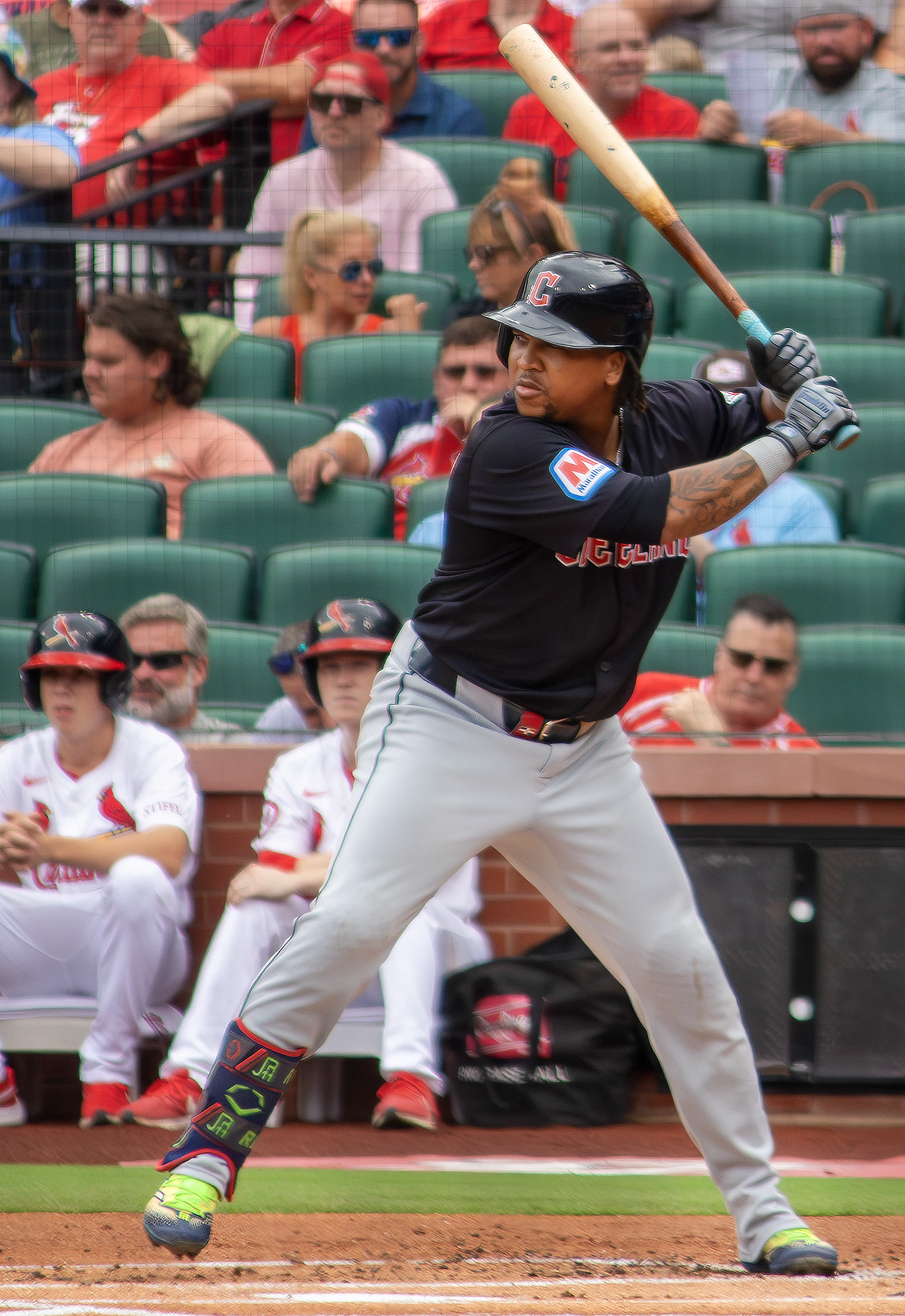
Ramírez batting in 2024

==== 2024 ====
On September 29, when the final game of the regular season against the Houston Astros was canceled due to rain, Ramírez finished the 2024 season batting .279/.335/.537 with 39 doubles, 39 home runs, and 41 stolen bases, falling one home run shy of becoming the seventh player to join the 40–40 club and only one double and a home run short of a 40–40–40 season. In the postseason, he batted .229/.364/.486 in 10 games as Cleveland lost in the American League Championship Series to the New York Yankees.

==== 2025 ====
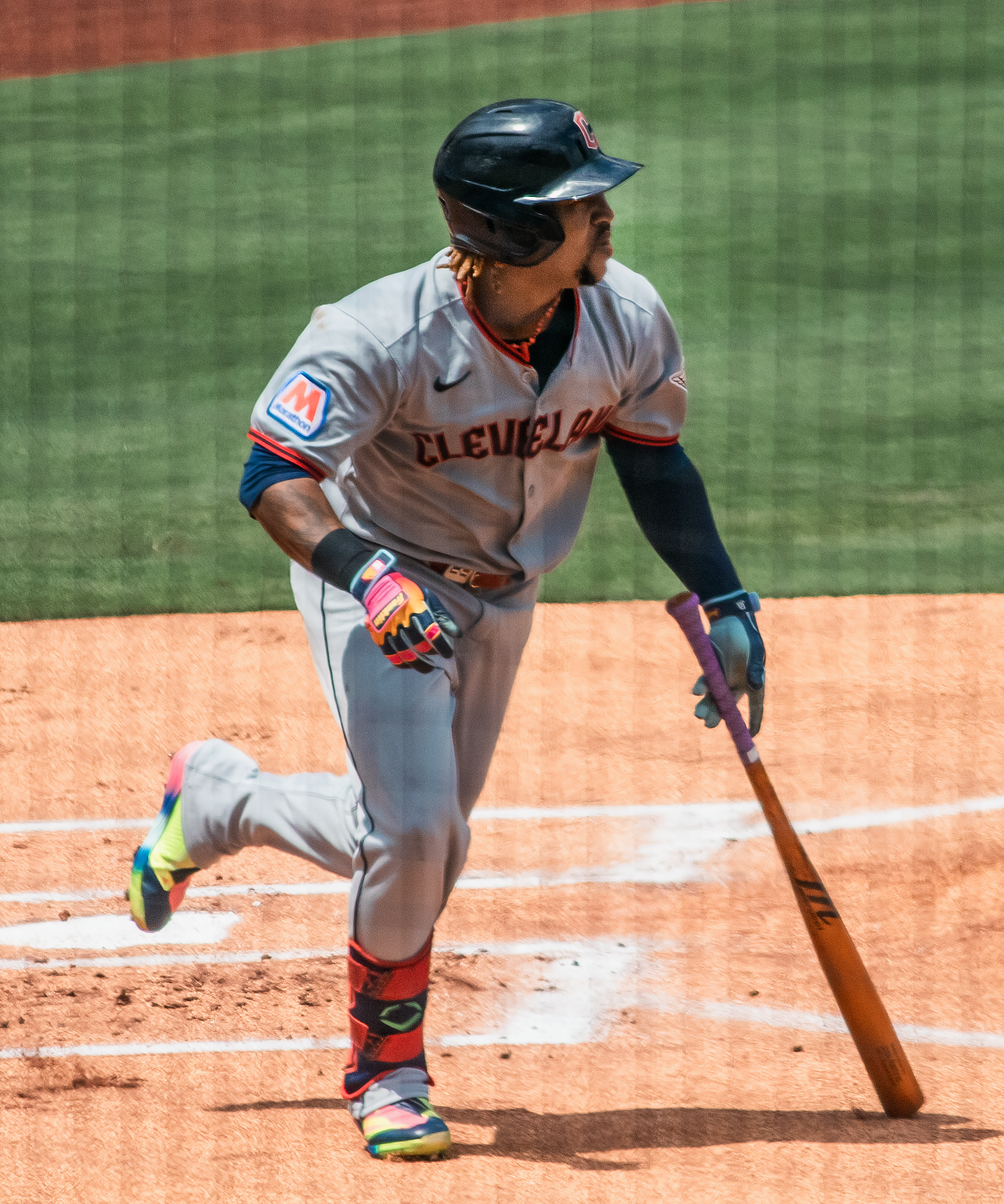
José Ramírez in Kansas City, 2025.

On April 4, 2025, Ramírez notched his second career three-home run game against the Los Angeles Angels. His fifth-inning bomb also swung Ramírez into the history books as it marked his 26th career multi-homer game, tying the franchise record held by Albert Belle and Jim Thome. On May 1, Ramírez stole his 250th career base against the Minnesota Twins. He became the first player in franchise history with at least 250 home runs and 250 stolen bases. He's the 24th player to pull off the feat and the second switch-hitter (along with Carlos Beltrán). He is also the first third baseman to accomplish the feat and the seventh player to achieve it with one team in major league history. On July 21, Ramírez hit a three-run home run against the Baltimore Orioles in the first inning he reached the 20-homer, 20-stolen base milestone for the seventh time in his career. Ramírez is only the sixth player in history to record seven such seasons, tied for fourth most all-time. On August 12, Ramírez hit two home runs against the Miami Marlins. In that game, he set the Guardians franchise record for most multi-homer games with 27, breaking a tie with Albert Belle and Jim Thome. On September 7, Ramírez hit a RBI triple against the Tampa Bay Rays in the sixth inning. With that RBI triple, Ramírez broke a tie with Jim Thome for the second-most RBIs in Cleveland history (938), since RBIs became an official stat in 1920. Earl Averill (1,084) ranks first. On September 19, Ramírez played his 1,600th game in a Cleveland uniform and became the first player in 100+ years in franchise history to accomplish that feat. The next day, in the first game of a Doubleheader, Ramírez would hit his 30th home run of the season, becoming the first player in Guardians history with 3 30–30 seasons, and just the second switch-hitter and third baseman to do so in major league history, after Howard Johnson. On September 25 against the Detroit Tigers, Ramírez hit an RBI double in the eighth inning, becoming Cleveland's all-time extra-base hits leader, with 726. He broke a tie with Earl Averill, who compiled 725 extra-base hits over 11 seasons with the franchise.

==== 2026 ====
On January 24, 2026, Ramírez and the Guardians agreed to a seven-year, $175 million contract extension, keeping him with the franchise through the 2032 season. On April 6, Ramirez broke Terry Turner's franchise record for most career games played. On April 11, he hit a home run against the Atlanta Braves, becoming the first player in franchise history to hit a home run against every MLB team during their career.

Against the A's on May 2, he became the second player in franchise history to steal 300 bases.

In the ALDS against the Chicago White Sox, he played a key role in the Guardians coming back from an 0-2 deficit to win the series 3-2. He contributed a double, triple and 2 RBIs in game 3, a home run and 3 RBIs in game 4 and a decisive 2-run homer in a 2-0 win in game 5. His home run was the lowest pitch ever tracked in the playoffs that led to a home run, being just 0.74 ft off the ground.

== Awards and honors ==
- 4× Bob Feller Man of the Year (2016, 2021, 2022, 2025)
- 7× Major League Baseball (MLB) All-Star (2017, 2018, 2021, 2022, 2023, 2024, 2025)
- 6× Silver Slugger at third base (2017, 2018, 2020, 2022, 2024, 2025)
- Youth baseball field on the west side of Cleveland named 'José Ramírez Field'.
- Street where field is located renamed 'Jose Ramírez Way'

== Milestones ==
- 3× 30–30 club (2018, 2024, 2025)
- 250-250 club

=== American League leader ===
- 2× Doubles (2017, 2022)
- 2× Extra base hits (2017, 2020)
- 2× Intentional bases on balls (2022, 2023)
- 3× Power–speed number (2018, 2020, 2024)
- Runs scored (2020)
- Runs created (2020)
- Sacrifice hits (2014)
- Wins Above Replacement—FanGraphs (2020)

== Personal life ==
Ramírez and his wife Rosedith have four children.

Ramírez's brother, Jose Báez Ramírez, signed with Cleveland in 2018. His brother, who went by Jose Baez as a ballplayer, retired in 2023 after playing for the Arizona Complex League Guardians.

Former teammate Francisco Lindor once said that if he owned a baseball team and could sign any player, it would be Ramírez, due to Ramírez's baseball instincts and dedication.

== See also ==
- Cleveland Guardians award winners and league leaders
- List of Cleveland Guardians team records
- List of Major League Baseball annual doubles leaders
- List of Major League Baseball annual runs scored leaders
- List of Major League Baseball doubles records
- List of Major League Baseball players from the Dominican Republic

Achievements
Preceded by Alex Bregman; José Abreu; Kyle Tucker	American League Player of the Month; July 2018; September 2020; April 2022	Succeeded by J. D. Martinez; Byron Buxton; Aaron Judge
