= 2024 Major League Baseball Home Run Derby =

Baseball competition

- Date: July 15, 2024
- Venue: Globe Life Field
- City: Arlington, Texas
- Winner: Teoscar Hernández
- Score: 14–13

The 2024 Major League Baseball Home Run Derby was a home run hitting contest between eight batters from Major League Baseball (MLB). The derby was held on July 15, 2024, at Globe Life Field in Arlington, the site of the 2024 MLB All-Star Game. The event was won by Teoscar Hernández of the Los Angeles Dodgers.

== Rules ==
=== Round one ===
The contestants are allowed 40 pitches, which must all be thrown in three minutes or less, to hit as many home runs as possible. The timer begins with the release of the first pitch, and the round ends when the timer hits zero. A home run will count if the timer hits zero, so long as the pitch was released beforehand. Each contestant is entitled to one 45-second timeout in each regulation period.

After the time expires, the contestants enter a bonus period, where they attempt to hit as many home runs as possible before they record three outs (any swing that is not a home run). There is no time limit in the bonus period. Additionally, if a contestant hits a home run that travels at least 425 feet (129.5 m) during the bonus period, they earn an additional out to work with.

Ties in this round are broken by the distance of each contestant's longest home run. The top four contestants advance to the next round.

=== Semifinals ===
The contestants are seeded based on their performance in the previous round (1 vs 4, 2 vs 3). The lower seed in each matchup will hit first.

The rules of the round remain the same as in round one. Ties in this round are broken by a 60-second tiebreaker with no bonus period or timeouts. If a tie remains, the contestants will engage in successive three-swing swing-offs until there is a winner. The winners of each matchup advance to the finals.

=== Finals ===
In the final round, the time limit is shortened to two minutes and the pitch limit is shortened to 27 pitches. The timeout and bonus period rules remain the same, while the tiebreaker rules carry over from the semifinals. The contestant with the most home runs is declared champion.

== Results ==
Globe Life Field, Arlington
Player	Team	Round one	Semifinals	Finals	Total
Teoscar Hernández	Dodgers	19	14^{(2)}	14	49
Bobby Witt Jr.	Royals	20	17	13	50
Alec Bohm	Phillies	21	14^{(1)}	–	36
José Ramírez	Guardians	21	12	–	33
Adolis García	Rangers	18	–	–	18
Marcell Ozuna	Braves	16	–	–	16
Pete Alonso	Mets	12	–	–	12
Gunnar Henderson	Orioles	11	–	–	11

Semifinals
1	Alec Bohm	15
4	Teoscar Hernández	16*
3	Bobby Witt Jr.	17
2	José Ramírez	12

Finals
4	Teoscar Hernández	14
3	Bobby Witt Jr.	13

* Round went into a swing-off after Bohm and Hernández were tied 14–14 after regulation.

== National anthem controversy ==
The opening of the derby was quickly buzzed on social media networks and news sites for its off-key performance of the national anthem by country artist Ingrid Andress, who later admitted to being drunk and stated that she would be entering rehab.
