= 2024 New York Mets season =

2024 New York Mets
- National League Wild Card winners
- League: National League
- Division: East
- Ballpark: Citi Field
- City: New York City, New York
- Record: 89–73 (.549)
- Divisional place: 3rd
- Owner: Steve Cohen
- President: David Stearns
- Manager: Carlos Mendoza
- Television: SportsNet New York; WPIX (CW affiliate)
- Radio: WCBS/WHSQ 880 AM (English); New York Mets Radio Network

The 2024 New York Mets season was the franchise's 63rd season in Major League Baseball, their 16th at Citi Field, and their fourth under majority owner Steve Cohen.

After a dismal 22–33 start to the season following a 10–3 loss to the Los Angeles Dodgers on May 29, the team held a critical meeting, led by shortstop Francisco Lindor. The Mets went 67–40 the rest of the way to finish with a 89–73 record. Following a win over the Boston Red Sox on September 4, they improved on their 75–87 record from their previous season.

On September 30, the Mets clinched a postseason berth for the second time in the past three seasons with an 8–7 win against the Atlanta Braves during the first game of a doubleheader.

One of the more memorable moments of the season occurred on June 12, when the McDonald's mascot Grimace threw out the ceremonial first pitch before a game against the Miami Marlins. The team then embarked on a seven-game win streak, a run that fans humorously credited to Grimace's good luck. The Mets also unveiled a new purple "Grimace Seat" in Citi Field on September 16.

Another moment humorously credited for the Mets success was the release of the song "OMG" by infielder Jose Iglesias, which the team played following home runs by Mets players at Citi Field and became the unofficial anthem of the team.

The Mets defeated the Milwaukee Brewers in the National League Wild Card Series two games to one to advance to the National League Division Series for the first time since the 2015 season. They then defeated their division rival Philadelphia Phillies three games to one to advance them to the National League Championship Series, becoming the 8th team in MLB history to make the LCS after being 11 or more games below .500. However, the Mets were defeated four games to two by the eventual World Series champion Los Angeles Dodgers in the National League Championship Series, ending their historic and magical playoff run. Despite the loss, one highlight came in Game 5 when the Mets became the first team since the 2002 Angels to avoid striking out in a postseason game.

Because of the team's vibrancy and perseverance, accumulating a league-leading 44 comeback victories with flair, and their improbable success in erasing a large postseason deficit, the 2024 season is regarded as one of the greatest in Mets history.

== Offseason ==
On October 2, 2023, the Mets formally introduced David Stearns as their new president of baseball operations. They also fired manager Buck Showalter, who led the Mets to a wild card berth in 2022 in which the Mets lost in three games to the San Diego Padres, but failed to improve on that in 2023 as the Mets went 75–87 and traded away pitchers Max Scherzer and Justin Verlander in an attempt to lower payroll at the trade deadline.

On October 5, GM Billy Eppler stepped down amid an investigation by MLB into him and the Mets for improperly using the injured list during the 2023 season.

On November 13, the Mets named former New York Yankees bench coach Carlos Mendoza as their next manager. He signed a three-year contract with a club option for a fourth year.

=== Transactions ===
==== 2023 ====
- November 6 – claimed infielder Zack Short off waivers from the Detroit Tigers.
- November 30 – signed right-handed relief pitcher Austin Adams to a one-year contract.
- December 1 – signed right-handed starting pitcher Luis Severino to a one-year, $13 million contract. The Mets also signed infielder Joey Wendle to a one-year, $2 million contract.
- December 5 – signed right-handed relief pitcher Michael Tonkin to a one-year, $1 million contract.
- December 14 – signed right-handed relief pitcher Jorge López to a one-year, $2 million contract.
- December 18 – acquired right-handed relief pitcher Yohan Ramírez from the Chicago White Sox in exchange for cash considerations.
- December 20 – acquired right-handed starting pitcher Adrian Houser and outfielder Tyrone Taylor from the Milwaukee Brewers in exchange for pitching prospect Coleman Crow.

==== 2024 ====
- January 4 – signed center fielder Harrison Bader to a one-year, $10.5 million contract.
- January 8 – signed left-handed starting pitcher Sean Manaea to a two-year, $28 million contract including an opt-out after the 2024 season.
- January 11 – signed first baseman Pete Alonso to a one-year, $20.5 million contract avoiding arbitration.
- January 30 – re-signed right-handed relief pitcher Adam Ottavino to a one-year, $4.5 million contract.
- February 2 – signed right-handed relief pitcher Shintaro Fujinami to a one-year, $3.35 million contract plus up to $850,000 in incentives. The Mets also signed left-handed relief pitcher Jake Diekman to a one-year, $4 million contract plus a vesting option for 2025.
- March 21 – signed designated hitter J. D. Martinez to a one-year, $12 million contract.

== Regular season ==
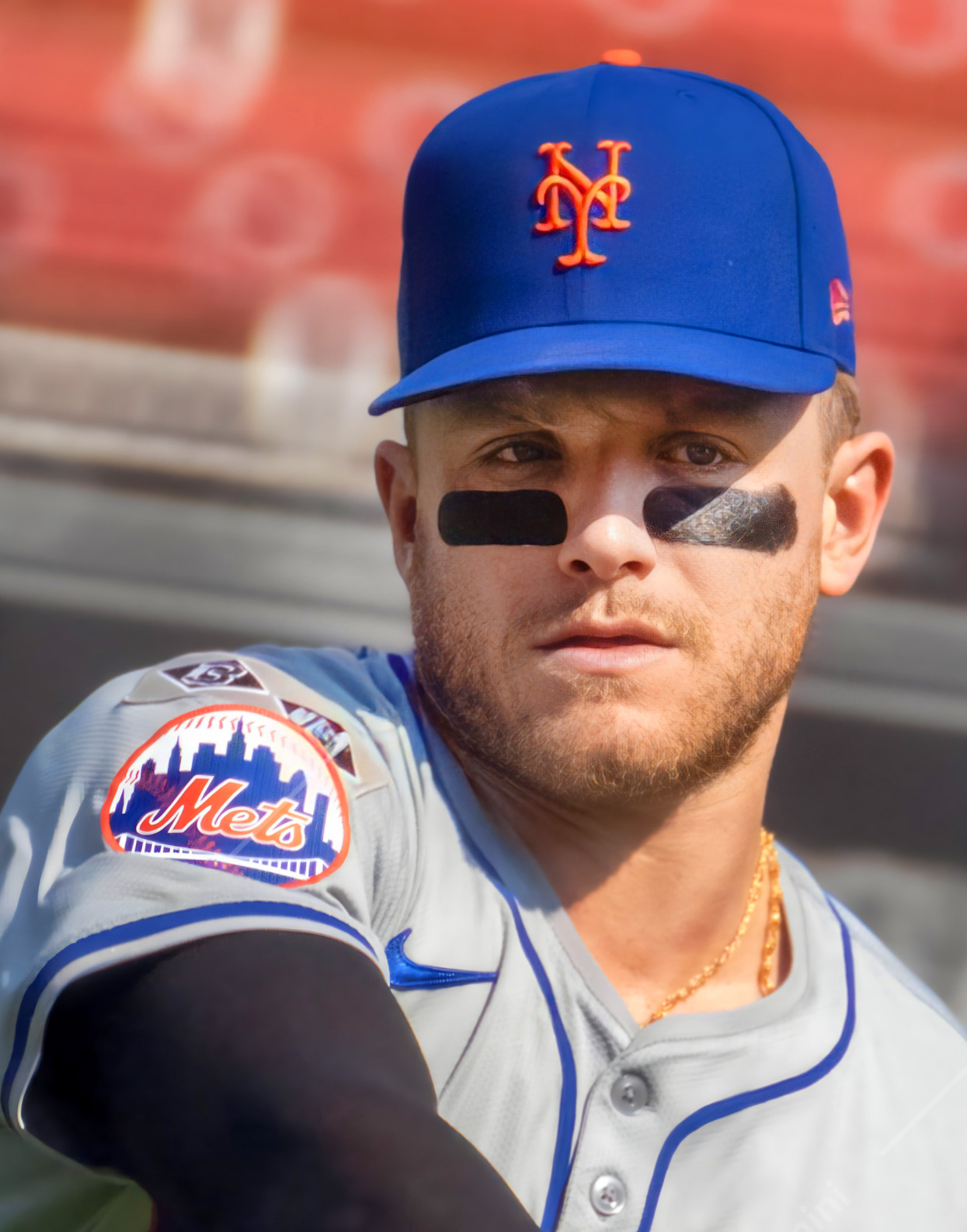
Harrison Bader with the Mets in 2024

=== March–April ===
The Mets started the season 0–5 for the first time since 2005 by getting swept by the Milwaukee Brewers and losing their first two games against the Detroit Tigers. They were able to avoid a sweep to the Tigers thanks to a 9th inning comeback on April 4 while ruining a no-hitter by the Tigers through 7 innings to get their first win of the season. By April 20, the Mets' record improved to 12–8 record thanks to a six-game winning streak and five series wins in a row. The Mets then entered a 1–5 stretch to fall back to .500 by April 27, losing two consecutive series in the process. They would recover to remain above .500 and to avoid a sweep thanks to an 11th inning walk-off home run by Mark Vientos on April 28.

=== May ===
At the end of April into the beginning of May, the Mets split the next series against the Chicago Cubs, including coming back from a 4–0 deficit on May 2, to remain above .500 with a 16-15 record. The Mets would then proceed to blow 3 consecutive leads in a series against the Tampa Bay Rays to fall to 16-18 and below .500. This sweep would begin a May that was full of struggles for the Mets, with multiple bullpen collapses and blown leads, most infamously by blowing a 9–5 lead in the bottom of the 9th inning on May 18 against the Miami Marlins. By May 29, following getting swept by the Los Angeles Dodgers, the Mets fell to 22–33, and a players-only meeting was held for forty minutes led by Francisco Lindor. The meeting initially produced positive results, as the Mets won the next two games against the Arizona Diamondbacks to improve to 24–33.

=== June ===
The Mets started June by losing two games to fall back to 24–35. Their loss on June 2 marked the sixth time the Mets lost a game after leading after eight innings. However, they would respond with their first sweep in a 3-game series since April, against the Washington Nationals from June 3–5. Subsequently, the Mets traveled to London for the MLB London Series against the Philadelphia Phillies. Despite the Phillies having the best record in baseball at the time, the Mets achieved a split, losing the first game on June 8 but winning on June 9 by coming back from a 3–0 deficit to defeat the Phillies 6–5 on a game-ending double play. Following a loss on June 11 to the Marlins, the Mets began a 7–game winning streak from June 12 to 18, which many fans and media attributed to McDonald's character Grimace throwing out the first pitch on June 12. The streak included coming back from a 6–2 deficit on June 18 against the Texas Rangers. The Mets' success in the month of June continued as the team reached .500 by sweeping the New York Yankees from June 25–26. However, they proceeded to lose their first series in a month to the Houston Astros, including a blown 6–1 lead on June 29. As a result, they finished the month, and the halfway point of their season, at 40–41.

=== July ===
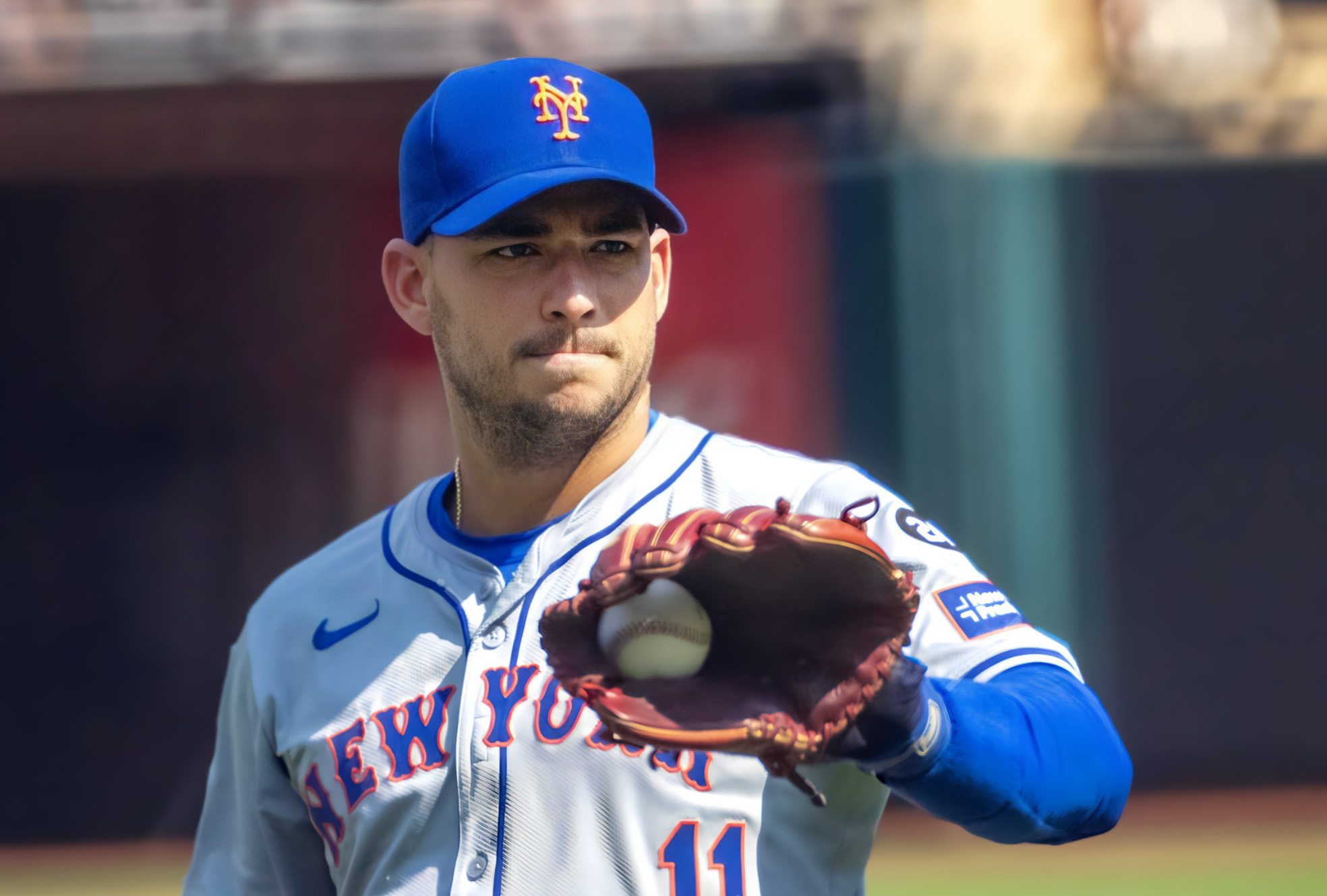
Jose Iglesias with the Mets in 2024

Following the series loss, the Mets split their next two series to open up July against the Nationals and Pittsburgh Pirates, to achieve a record of 44–45. After the Mets achieved their first shutout win against the Nationals on July 11, they found themselves tied for a playoff position for the first time since May 9, and two games above .500 for the first time since April 24, with a 47–45 record. After a win against the Colorado Rockies the next day, the Mets advanced into a tie for the 2nd wild card spot. They proceeded to split the next two games with the Rockies, entering the All-Star break with a 49–46 record, and sole possession of the third wild card.

Following the All-Star break, the Mets improved to a 55–48 record thanks to a series split with the Marlins, another sweep of the Yankees and winning the first two games against the Atlanta Braves, briefly surpassing them in the standings and taking the top wild card spot in the National League. However, the Mets finished July going 2–3, finishing the month 57–51 and falling out of the playoff picture.

=== August ===
The Mets entered a tailspin as August began, as they dropped a series to the Los Angeles Angels. While they then won one game against the St. Louis Cardinals and took two out of three from the Colorado Rockies, the Mets then proceeded to get swept by the Seattle Mariners where they only put up one run the entire series, and lose a series against the Oakland Athletics. This included blowing a 5–0 lead in the series finale on August 15, which dropped their record to 62–59. However, fortunes for the Mets improved later in August. After winning the series against the Marlins, the Mets were able to win another series against the Baltimore Orioles thanks to walk-off home runs by both Francisco Álvarez and Jesse Winker, to improve to 66–61. Back on their August 17 win against the Marlins, pitcher Luis Severino threw a complete game shutout, the first for the Mets since April 2021.

After going 2–1 in their first 3 games against the San Diego Padres, the Mets bullpen collapsed on August 25, forcing the Mets to settle for a split and knocking their record to 68–63, keeping them 2.5 games out of the playoffs. The bullpen collapsed again on August 28 against the Arizona Diamondbacks in an 8–5 loss, and the Mets fell to 4 games back of the Braves in the National League Wild Card. With only 29 games to play, they continue losing control of their own destiny, with a 69–64 record. However, one day later, the Mets still clinched the series win and improved their record to 70–64.

=== September ===
As September approached, the Mets would then go on to achieve a 9-game winning streak, their longest since 2018 by sweeping both the Chicago White Sox and Boston Red Sox, and taking the first two games of the series against the Cincinnati Reds. However, their winning streak came to an end after the Reds defeated the Mets 3–1 in the series finale, falling to 78–65. With that win streak, they would ultimately end up back in playoff position by tying the Braves for the final NL Wild Card spot.

Despite the Mets' loss to the Reds, they continued to keep their playoff hopes alive and play good baseball, by taking two of three against the Toronto Blue Jays. On September 11, following Francisco Lindor's game-tying home run that broke up Bowden Francis' no-hit bid in the top of the 9th, the Mets scored six runs during that inning, culminated by a three-run homer by Francisco Álvarez, leading them to a 6–2 victory. The Mets then traveled to Philadelphia for a three-game set against the Philadelphia Phillies, winning the series opener 11–3, but dropping the next two games to lose their first series in a month, bringing their record to 81–68. However, on September 16, the Mets sealed their first winning season since 2022 when they clinched their 82nd victory of the year, a 2–1 win over the Washington Nationals.

After completing a 3-game sweep of the Nationals, the Mets then proceeded to start another series with the Phillies, ultimately scoring ten or more runs across three games for the first time in franchise history. This established a two-game lead for the wild card over the Atlanta Braves. The Mets maintained that lead by winning two of the remaining three games against the Phillies, winning the series and improving their record to 87–69. The two weekend games featured a combined attendance of 87,291, which was the largest regular season attendance on back-to-back games excluding the Subway Series in the history of Citi Field. However, the Mets were eliminated from division title contention on September 23 when the Phillies beat the Chicago Cubs 6–2.

On September 24, the Mets lost the series opener to the Braves, making them drop to a game in front of them in the Wild Card, before the next two games were postponed into a September 30 doubleheader due to the forecast from Hurricane Helene. Following a loss to the Milwaukee Brewers on September 27, the Mets found themselves in a 3-way tie with the Braves and Arizona Diamondbacks for the final two spots. Following a series loss on the next day to the Brewers, the Mets still found themselves tied with the Diamondbacks for the final Wild Card spot. However, the Braves also advanced one game in front of them. Following a win by the Mets and Diamondbacks and a loss by the Braves on September 29, the Mets had an 88–72 record, needing to win one game to clinch the playoffs.

In the first game of the doubleheader on the following day, where the Mets would ultimately clinch their 11th postseason berth in franchise history, was regarded as the "game of the year" due to the game's importance and the multiple lead changes in the later innings. The Braves led 3–0 after 7 innings, but the Mets scored six runs in the top of the 8th, claiming a 6–3 lead capped by a home run from Brandon Nimmo. However, the Braves scored four runs in the bottom of the 8th, mainly due to a bases-clearing double from Ozzie Albies, to claim a 7–6 lead. However, in the top of the 9th, Francisco Lindor hit a go-ahead 2-run homer to put the Mets in front 8–7, which was the final score. This became the first game the Mets won by trailing by three runs or more after 7 innings since May 17, 2023. The Mets lost the second game of the doubleheader 3–0 to finish the season 89–73.

=== Transactions ===
==== 2024 ====
- April 5 – signed right-handed starting pitcher Julio Teherán to a one-year, $2.5 million contract.
- May 25 – acquired infielder/outfielder Pablo Reyes from the Boston Red Sox for cash considerations.
- May 31 – acquired catcher Luis Torrens from the New York Yankees for cash considerations.
- July 10 – acquired right-handed relief pitcher Phil Maton from the Tampa Bay Rays for a player to be named later or cash considerations.
- July 26 – acquired right-handed relief pitcher Ryne Stanek from the Seattle Mariners in exchange for minor league outfielder Rhylan Thomas.
- July 28 – acquired outfielder Jesse Winker from the Washington Nationals in exchange for right-handed pitching prospect Tyler Stuart.
- July 30 – acquired right-handed starting pitcher Paul Blackburn from the Oakland Athletics in exchange for right-handed pitching prospect Kade Morris. The Mets also acquired right-handed relief pitcher Huascar Brazobán from the Miami Marlins for infield prospect Wilfredo Lara. They also acquired right-handed relief pitcher Tyler Zuber from the Tampa Bay Rays in exchange for right-handed pitching prospect Paul Gervase.
- September 10 – acquired infielder Eddy Alvarez from the Boston Red Sox for cash considerations.

== Season standings ==
=== National League East ===
NL East
Team	W	L	Pct.	GB	Home	Road
Philadelphia Phillies	95	67	.586	—	54‍–‍27	41‍–‍40
Atlanta Braves	89	73	.549	6	46‍–‍35	43‍–‍38
New York Mets	89	73	.549	6	46‍–‍35	43‍–‍38
Washington Nationals	71	91	.438	24	38‍–‍43	33‍–‍48
Miami Marlins	62	100	.383	33	30‍–‍51	32‍–‍49

=== National League Wild Card ===
Division leaders
Team	W	L	Pct.
Los Angeles Dodgers	98	64	.605
Philadelphia Phillies	95	67	.586
Milwaukee Brewers	93	69	.574

Wild Card teams (Top 3 teams qualify for postseason)
Team	W	L	Pct.	GB
San Diego Padres	93	69	.574	+4
Atlanta Braves	89	73	.549	—
New York Mets	89	73	.549	—
Arizona Diamondbacks	89	73	.549	—
St. Louis Cardinals	83	79	.512	6
Chicago Cubs	83	79	.512	6
San Francisco Giants	80	82	.494	9
Cincinnati Reds	77	85	.475	12
Pittsburgh Pirates	76	86	.469	13
Washington Nationals	71	91	.438	18
Miami Marlins	62	100	.383	27
Colorado Rockies	61	101	.377	28

=== Record vs. opponents ===
==== Record vs. National League ====
2024 National League record Source: MLB Standings Grid – 2024
Team	AZ	ATL	CHC	CIN	COL	LAD	MIA	MIL	NYM	PHI	PIT	SD	SF	STL	WSH	AL
Arizona	—	2–5	3–3	5–1	9–4	6–7	4–2	4–3	3–4	4–3	4–2	6–7	7–6	3–3	5–1	24–22
Atlanta	5–2	—	4–2	2–4	3–3	2–5	9–4	2–4	7–6	7–6	3–3	3–4	4–3	2–4	5–8	31–15
Chicago	3–3	2–4	—	5–8	4–2	4–2	4–3	5–8	3–4	2–4	7–6	2–4	3–4	6–7	6–1	27–19
Cincinnati	1–5	4–2	8–5	—	6–1	4–3	5–2	4–9	2–4	4–3	5–8	2–4	2–4	7–6	2–4	21–25
Colorado	4–9	3–3	2–4	1–6	—	3–10	2–5	4–3	2–4	2–4	2–4	8–5	3–10	3–4	2–4	20–26
Los Angeles	7–6	5–2	2–4	3–4	10–3	—	5–1	4–3	4–2	1–5	4–2	5–8	9–4	5–2	4–2	30–16
Miami	2–4	4–9	3–4	2–5	5–2	1–5	—	4–2	6–7	6–7	0–7	2–4	3–3	3–3	2–11	19–27
Milwaukee	3–4	4–2	8–5	9–4	3–4	3–4	2–4	—	5–1	2–4	7–6	2–5	4–2	8–5	2–4	31–15
New York	4–3	6–7	4–3	4–2	4–2	2–4	7–6	1–5	—	6–7	5–2	5–2	2–4	4–2	11–2	24–22
Philadelphia	3–4	6–7	4–2	3–4	4–2	5–1	7–6	4–2	7–6	—	3–4	5–1	5–2	4–2	9–4	26–20
Pittsburgh	2–4	3–3	6–7	8–5	4–2	2–4	7–0	6–7	2–5	4–3	—	0–6	2–4	5–8	4–3	20–26
San Diego	7–6	4–3	4–2	4–2	5–8	8–5	4–2	5–2	2–5	1–5	6–0	—	7–6	3–4	6–0	27–19
San Francisco	6–7	3–4	4–3	4–2	10–3	4–9	3–3	2–4	4–2	2–5	4–2	6–7	—	1–5	4–3	23–23
St. Louis	3–3	4–2	7–6	6–7	4–3	2–5	3–3	5–8	2–4	2–4	8–5	4–3	5–1	—	4–3	24–22
Washington	1–5	8–5	1–6	4–2	4–2	2–4	11–2	4–2	2–11	4–9	3–4	0–6	3–4	3–4	—	21–25

Updated with the results of all games through September 30, 2024.

==== Record vs. American League ====
2024 National League record vs. American League Source: MLB Standings
Team	BAL	BOS	CWS	CLE	DET	HOU	KC	LAA	MIN	NYY	OAK	SEA	TB	TEX	TOR
Arizona	1–2	3–0	2–1	3–0	1–2	1–2	2–1	2–1	1–2	1–2	2–1	1–2	0–3	2–2	2–1
Atlanta	1–2	3–1	1–2	2–1	3–0	3–0	2–1	2–1	3–0	2–1	2–1	1–2	2–1	2–1	2–1
Chicago	3–0	1–2	4–0	0–3	2–1	3–0	2–1	2–1	2–1	1–2	1–2	2–1	1–2	1–2	2–1
Cincinnati	0–3	1–2	3–0	1–3	0–3	3–0	0–3	3–0	2–1	3–0	1–2	0–3	1–2	1–2	2–1
Colorado	1–2	2–1	1–2	2–1	1–2	0–4	2–1	2–1	1–2	1–2	1–2	1–2	1–2	3–0	1–2
Los Angeles	2–1	3–0	3–0	2–1	1–2	1–2	2–1	2–2	2–1	2–1	2–1	3–0	2–1	1–2	2–1
Miami	2–1	0–3	2–1	1–2	2–1	0–3	1–2	0–3	2–1	1–2	1–2	2–1	1–3	1–2	3–0
Milwaukee	2–1	2–1	3–0	3–0	2–1	1–2	1–2	2–1	3–1	1–2	2–1	2–1	2–1	3–0	2–1
New York	2–1	3–0	3–0	0–3	1–2	1–2	2–1	1–2	2–1	4–0	1–2	0–3	0–3	2–1	2–1
Philadelphia	1–2	1–2	3–0	1–2	2–1	2–1	2–1	2–1	1–2	0–3	1–2	1–2	3–0	3–0	3–1
Pittsburgh	2–1	0–3	3–0	1–2	2–2	2–1	1–2	1–2	2–1	2–1	0–3	2–1	1–2	1–2	1–2
San Diego	2–1	2–1	3–0	2–1	2–1	2–1	2–1	0–3	2–1	1–2	3–0	1–3	2–1	2–1	1–2
San Francisco	2–1	1–2	2–1	1–2	2–1	2–1	3–0	1–2	2–1	0–3	2–2	1–2	1–2	2–1	1–2
St. Louis	3–0	2–1	1–2	2–1	1–2	1–2	1–3	2–1	2–1	2–1	2–1	1–2	2–1	2–1	0–3
Washington	2–2	1–2	1–2	1–2	2–1	2–1	0–3	2–1	1–2	2–1	1–2	2–1	1–2	1–2	2–1

Updated with the results of all games through September 30, 2024.

== Game log ==
=== Regular season ===
Legend
Mets Win	Mets Loss	Game Postponed	Clinched playoff spot
Bold = Mets team member

2024 Game Log
Overall: 89–73 (Home: 46–35; Away: 43–38)
March/April: 15–14 (Home: 8–9; Away: 7–5)

#	Date	Opponent	Box Score	Win	Loss	Save	Location (Attendance)	Record
—	March 28	Brewers	Postponed (rain); Makeup: March 29					
1	March 29	Brewers	1–3	Peralta (1–0)	**Quintana** (0–1)	Uribe (1)	**Citi Field** (42,137)	0–1
2	March 30	Brewers	6–7	Peguero (1–0)	**Severino** (0–1)	Uribe (2)	**Citi Field** (30,296)	0–2
3	March 31	Brewers	1–4	Rea (1–0)	**Megill** (0–1)	Payamps (1)	**Citi Field** (22,222)	0–3
4	April 1	Tigers	0–5 (10)	Foley (1–0)	**Tonkin** (0–1)	—	**Citi Field** (16,853)	0–4
—	April 2	Tigers	Postponed (rain); Makeup: April 4					
—	April 3	Tigers	Postponed (rain); Makeup: April 4					
5	April 4	Tigers	3–6 (11)	Miller (2–0)	**Tonkin** (0–2)	—	**Citi Field** (see 2nd game)	0–5
6	April 4	Tigers	2–1	**Garrett** (1–0)	Faedo (0–1)	—	**Citi Field** (15,020)	1–5
7	April 5	@ Reds	3–2	**Smith** (1–0)	Cruz (0–1)	**Díaz** (1)	Great American Ball Park (16,620)	2–5
8	April 6	@ Reds	6–9	Pagán (1–0)	**Ramírez** (0–1)	—	Great American Ball Park (28,307)	2–6
9	April 7	@ Reds	3–1	**Manaea** (1–0)	Abbott (0–1)	**Díaz** (2)	Great American Ball Park (26,656)	3–6
10	April 8	@ Braves	8–7	**Diekman** (1–0)	Johnson (2–1)	**López** (1)	Truist Park (37,538)	4–6
11	April 9	@ Braves	5–6	López (1–0)	**Houser** (0–1)	Iglesias (2)	Truist Park (32,065)	4–7
—	April 10	@ Braves	Postponed (rain); Makeup: September 26					
12	April 11	@ Braves	16–4	**Quintana** (1–1)	Winans (0–1)	—	Truist Park (34,352)	5–7
13	April 12	Royals	6–1	**Severino** (1–1)	Wacha (1–1)	—	**Citi Field** (18,822)	6–7
14	April 13	Royals	7–11	Marsh (2–0)	**Manaea** (1–1)	—	**Citi Field** (25,387)	6–8
15	April 14	Royals	2–1	**Raley** (1–0)	Stratton (1–1)	**Díaz** (3)	**Citi Field** (32,749)	7–8
16	April 15	Pirates	6–3	**Ottavino** (1–0)	Chapman (0–1)	**Díaz** (4)	**Citi Field** (18,266)	8–8
17	April 16	Pirates	3–1	**Garrett** (2–0)	Ortiz (1–1)	**Smith** (1)	**Citi Field** (18,398)	9–8
18	April 17	Pirates	9–1	**Severino** (2–1)	Falter (1–1)	—	**Citi Field** (18,092)	10–8
19	April 19	@ Dodgers	9–4	**Garrett** (3–0)	Hudson (1–1)	—	Dodger Stadium (44,783)	11–8
20	April 20	@ Dodgers	6–4	**Tonkin** (1–2)	Yarbrough (2–1)	**Garrett** (1)	Dodger Stadium (45,373)	12–8
21	April 21	@ Dodgers	0–10	Glasnow (4–1)	**Houser** (0–2)	—	Dodger Stadium (49,287)	12–9
22	April 22	@ Giants	2–5	Winn (2–3)	**Quintana** (1–2)	—	Oracle Park (24,138)	12–10
23	April 23	@ Giants	1–5	Webb (3–1)	**Severino** (2–2)	Doval (4)	Oracle Park (25,453)	12–11
24	April 24	@ Giants	8–2	**Garrett** (4–0)	Hjelle (0–1)	—	Oracle Park (30,183)	13–11
25	April 26	Cardinals	2–4	Mikolas (2–3)	**Buttó** (0–1)	Helsley (8)	**Citi Field** (24,159)	13–12
26	April 27	Cardinals	4–7	Gray (3–1)	**Houser** (0–3)	Helsley (9)	**Citi Field** (32,332)	13–13
27	April 28	Cardinals	4–2 (11)	**Garrett** (5–0)	Liberatore (0–1)	—	**Citi Field** (30,980)	14–13
28	April 29	Cubs	1–3	Leiter Jr. (1–1)	**Díaz** (0–1)	Neris (4)	**Citi Field** (25,046)	14–14
29	April 30	Cubs	4–2	**Reid-Foley** (1–0)	Alzolay (1–3)	**López** (2)	**Citi Field** (22,880)	15–14

May: 9–19 (Home: 5–10; Away: 4–9)

#	Date	Opponent	Box Score	Win	Loss	Save	Location (Attendance)	Record
30	May 1	Cubs	0–1	Imanaga (5–0)	**Buttó** (0–2)	Neris (5)	**Citi Field** (22,485)	15–15
31	May 2	Cubs	7–6 (11)	**D. Young** (1–0)	Palencia (0–1)	—	**Citi Field** (22,224)	16–15
32	May 3	@ Rays	8–10	Armstrong (1–1)	**Quintana** (1–3)	Adam (2)	Tropicana Field (19,077)	16–16
33	May 4	@ Rays	1–3	Adam (2–0)	**Ottavino** (1–1)	Maton (1)	Tropicana Field (18,968)	16–17
34	May 5	@ Rays	6–7 (10)	Ramírez (1–0)	**Diekman** (1–1)	—	Tropicana Field (19,310)	16–18
35	May 6	@ Cardinals	4–3	**Manaea** (2–1)	Kittredge (0–1)	**Díaz** (5)	Busch Stadium (31,283)	17–18
36	May 7	@ Cardinals	7–5	**Buttó** (1–2)	Mikolas (2–5)	**Ottavino** (1)	Busch Stadium (32,606)	18–18
--	May 8	@ Cardinals	Postponed (rain); Makeup: August 5th					
37	May 10	Braves	2–4	Morton (3–0)	**Quintana** (1–4)	Iglesias (10)	**Citi Field** (23,355)	18–19
38	May 11	Braves	1–4	Fried (3–1)	**Scott** (0–1)	—	**Citi Field** (38,919)	18–20
39	May 12	Braves	4–3	**Díaz** (1–1)	Minter (5–3)	—	**Citi Field** (18,944)	19–20
40	May 13	Phillies	4–5 (10)	Kerkering (1–0)	**Reid-Foley** (1–1)	Alvarado (8)	**Citi Field** (28,086)	19–21
41	May 14	Phillies	0–4	Nola (5–2)	**Buttó** (1–3)	—	**Citi Field** (30,047)	19–22
42	May 15	@ Phillies	5–10	Suárez (8–0)	**Lucchesi** (0–1)	—	Citizens Bank Park (37,219)	19–23
43	May 16	@ Phillies	6–5 (11)	**López** (1–0)	Alvarado (1–2)	**Diekman** (1)	Citizens Bank Park (38,267)	20–23
44	May 17	@ Marlins	0–8	Luzardo (1–3)	**Scott** (0–2)	—	LoanDepot Park (13,555)	20–24
45	May 18	@ Marlins	9–10 (10)	Scott (3–4)	**López** (1–1)	—	LoanDepot Park (15,304)	20–25
46	May 19	@ Marlins	7–3	**Manaea** (3–1)	Sánchez (0–2)	**Garrett** (2)	LoanDepot Park (19,946)	21–25
47	May 20	@ Guardians	1–3	Lively (3–2)	**Megill** (0–2)	Clase (14)	Progressive Field (20,046)	21–26
48	May 21	@ Guardians	6–7	Sandlin (4–0)	**Houser** (0–4)	Clase (15)	Progressive Field (20,977)	21–27
49	May 22	@ Guardians	3–6	Gaddis (3–1)	**Garrett** (5–1)	Smith (1)	Progressive Field (22,322)	21–28
50	May 24	Giants	7–8	Avila (1–0)	**Garrett** (5–2)	Doval (9)	**Citi Field** (26,658)	21–29
51	May 25	Giants	2–7 (10)	Jackson (3–1)	**Reid-Foley** (1–2)	—	**Citi Field** (32,971)	21–30
52	May 26	Giants	4–3	**Houser** (1–4)	Rogers (0–1)	—	**Citi Field** (41,016)	22–30
--	May 27	Dodgers	Postponed (rain); Makeup: May 28th					
53	May 28	Dodgers	2–5 (10)	Hudson (2–1)	**López** (1–2)	Treinen (1)	**Citi Field** (see 2nd game)	22–31
54	May 28	Dodgers	0–3	Stone (5–2)	**Quintana** (1–5)	Vesia (2)	**Citi Field** (36,021)	22–32
55	May 29	Dodgers	3–10	Treinen (2–0)	**Ottavino** (1–2)	—	**Citi Field** (23,890)	22–33
56	May 30	Diamondbacks	3–2	**D. Young** (2–0)	Thompson (2–2)	**Garrett** (3)	**Citi Field** (20,926)	23–33
57	May 31	Diamondbacks	10–9	**Severino** (3–2)	Montgomery (3–3)	—	**Citi Field** (33,884)	24–33

June: 16–8 (Home: 8–6; Away: 8–2)

#	Date	Opponent	Box Score	Win	Loss	Save	Location (Attendance)	Record
58	June 1	Diamondbacks	5–10	Ginkel (3–1)	**Manaea** (3–2)	—	**Citi Field** (30,600)	24–34
59	June 2	Diamondbacks	4–5	Martínez (2–0)	**Diekman** (1–2)	Sewald (5)	**Citi Field** (31,059)	24–35
60	June 3	@ Nationals	8–7	**Megill** (1–2)	Gore (4–5)	**Diekman** (2)	Nationals Park (20,575)	25–35
61	June 4	@ Nationals	6–3	**Peterson** (1–0)	Herz (0–1)	—	Nationals Park (21,570)	26–35
62	June 5	@ Nationals	9–1	**Severino** (4–2)	Corbin (1–7)	—	Nationals Park (18,775)	27–35
63	June 8*	Phillies	2–7	Suárez (10–1)	**Manaea** (3–3)	—	London Stadium (53,882)	27–36
64	June 9*	@ Phillies	6–5	**Garrett** (6–2)	Alvarado (1–3)	**Smith** (2)	London Stadium (55,074)	28–36
65	June 11	Marlins	2–4	Luzardo (3–5)	**Megill** (1–3)	Scott (8)	**Citi Field** (22,070)	28–37
66	June 12	Marlins	10–4	**Peterson** (2–0)	Garrett (2–2)	—	**Citi Field** (19,803)	29–37
67	June 13	Marlins	3–2	**Díaz** (2–1)	Scott (5–5)	—	**Citi Field** (22,485)	30–37
68	June 14	Padres	2–1	**Manaea** (4–3)	Waldron (4–6)	**Díaz** (6)	**Citi Field** (22,850)	31–37
69	June 15	Padres	5–1	**Quintana** (2–5)	Mazur (0–2)	—	**Citi Field** (37,031)	32–37
70	June 16	Padres	11–6	**Megill** (2–3)	Cease (6–6)	—	**Citi Field** (31,054)	33–37
71	June 17	@ Rangers	14–2	**Peterson** (3–0)	Gray (2–3)	—	Globe Life Field (32,590)	34–37
72	June 18	@ Rangers	7–6	**Garrett** (7–2)	Yates (3–1)	**Díaz** (7)	Globe Life Field (36,274)	35–37
73	June 19	@ Rangers	3–5	Ureña (3–5)	**Smith** (1–1)	Yates (11)	Globe Life Field (36,095)	35–38
74	June 21	@ Cubs	11–1	**Quintana** (3–5)	Imanaga (7–2)	—	Wrigley Field (37,037)	36–38
75	June 22	@ Cubs	1–8	Taillon (4–3)	**Megill** (2–4)	—	Wrigley Field (39,319)	36–39
76	June 23	@ Cubs	5–2	**Severino** (5–2)	Assad (4–3)	**Diekman** (3)	Wrigley Field (39,417)	37–39
77	June 25	Yankees	9–7	**Núñez** (1–0)	Cole (0–1)	—	**Citi Field** (42,824)	38–39
78	June 26	Yankees	12–2	**Manaea** (5–3)	Gil (9–3)	**Houser** (1)	**Citi Field** (43,004)	39–39
79	June 28	Astros	7–2	**Núñez** (2–0)	Blanco (8–3)	—	**Citi Field** (32,465)	40–39
80	June 29	Astros	6–9	Martinez (3–2)	**Garrett** (7–3)	Hader (12)	**Citi Field** (32,348)	40–40
81	June 30	Astros	5–10 (11)	Scott (4–2)	**Festa** (0–1)	—	**Citi Field** (26,853)	40–41
*June 8 and 9 games played in London, England

July: 17–10 (Home: 9–4; Away: 8–6)

#	Date	Opponent	Box Score	Win	Loss	Save	Location (Attendance)	Record
82	July 1	@ Nationals	9–7 (10)	**Diekman** (2–2)	Harvey (2–4)	**Garrett** (4)	Nationals Park (26,719)	41–41
83	July 2	@ Nationals	7–2 (10)	**Buttó** (2–3)	Garcia (0–3)	—	Nationals Park (19,844)	42–41
84	July 3	@ Nationals	5–7	Barnes (4–2)	**Diekman** (2–3)	Finnegan (23)	Nationals Park (32,391)	42–42
85	July 4	@ Nationals	0–1	Irvin (7–6)	**Houser** (1–5)	Law (1)	Nationals Park (34,394)	42–43
86	July 5	@ Pirates	2–14	Skenes (5–0)	**Severino** (5–3)	—	PNC Park (37,037)	42–44
87	July 6	@ Pirates	5–2	**Buttó** (3–3)	Falter (4–7)	**Díaz** (8)	PNC Park (36,009)	43–44
88	July 7	@ Pirates	3–2	**Díaz** (3–1)	Chapman (1–4)	—	PNC Park (23,147)	44–44
89	July 8	@ Pirates	2–8	Keller (10–5)	**Orze** (0–1)	—	PNC Park (16,158)	44–45
90	July 9	Nationals	7–5	**Quintana** (4–5)	Irvin (7–7)	**Díaz** (9)	**Citi Field** (31,243)	45–45
91	July 10	Nationals	6–2	**Severino** (6–3)	Corbin (1–9)	**Buttó** (1)	**Citi Field** (24,887)	46–45
92	July 11	Nationals	7–0	**Peterson** (4–0)	Gore (6–8)	—	**Citi Field** (25,710)	47–45
93	July 12	Rockies	7–6	**Manaea** (6–3)	Gordon (0–2)	**Díaz** (10)	**Citi Field** (28,852)	48–45
94	July 13	Rockies	7–3	**Buttó** (4–3)	Feltner (1–9)	**Núñez** (1)	**Citi Field** (31,029)	49–45
95	July 14	Rockies	5–8	Lawrence (2–3)	**Quintana** (4–6)	Vodnik (2)	**Citi Field** (24,970)	49–46
**94th All-Star Game in Arlington, Texas**
96	July 19	@ Marlins	4–6	Bender (4–2)	**Manaea** (6–4)	Scott (15)	LoanDepot Park (16,542)	49–47
97	July 20	@ Marlins	1–0	**Severino** (7–3)	Muñoz (1–5)	**Díaz** (11)	LoanDepot Park (21,902)	50–47
98	July 21	@ Marlins	2–4	Cronin (2–2)	**Scott** (0–3)	Scott (16)	LoanDepot Park (19,418)	50–48
99	July 22	@ Marlins	6–4	**Peterson** (5–0)	Chirinos (0–2)	**Díaz** (12)	LoanDepot Park (13,068)	51–48
100	July 23	@ Yankees	3–2	**Quintana** (5–6)	Tonkin (3–4)	**Diekman** (4)	Yankee Stadium (47,453)	52–48
101	July 24	@ Yankees	12–3	**Ottavino** (2–2)	Cole (3–2)	—	Yankee Stadium (48,760)	53–48
102	July 25	Braves	3–2 (10)	**Maton** (2–2)	Johnson (3–2)	—	**Citi Field** (34,087)	54–48
103	July 26	Braves	8–4	**Senga** (1–0)	Morton (5–6)	—	**Citi Field** (34,673)	55–48
104	July 27	Braves	0–4	Schwellenbach (4–5)	**Megill** (2–5)	—	**Citi Field** (35,149)	55–49
105	July 28	Braves	2–9	Lee (3–2)	**Peterson** (5–1)	—	**Citi Field** (26,916)	55–50
106	July 29	Twins	15–2	**Quintana** (6–6)	Woods Richardson (3–2)	**Buttó** (2)	**Citi Field** (28,507)	56–50
107	July 30	Twins	2–0	**Manaea** (7–4)	Festa (1–2)	**Díaz** (13)	**Citi Field** (27,767)	57–50
108	July 31	Twins	3–8	López (10–7)	**Severino** (7–4)	—	**Citi Field** (28,875)	57–51

August: 15–13 (Home: 5–4; Away: 10–9)

#	Date	Opponent	Box Score	Win	Loss	Save	Location (Attendance)	Record
109	August 2	@ Angels	5–1	**Blackburn** (5–2)	Anderson (8–10)	—	Angel Stadium (37,012)	58–51
110	August 3	@ Angels	4–5	Moore (5–2)	**Brazobán** (1–3)	Joyce (1)	Angel Stadium (36,377)	58–52
111	August 4	@ Angels	2–3	Canning (4–10)	**Quintana** (6–7)	Contreras (2)	Angel Stadium (37,811)	58–53
112	August 5	@ Cardinals	6–0	**Manaea** (8–4)	Pallante (4–6)	—	Busch Stadium (34,881)	59–53
113	August 6	@ Rockies	3–6	Lawrence (4–4)	**Severino** (7–5)	Vodnik (6)	Coors Field (30,392)	59–54
114	August 7	@ Rockies	5–3	**Buttó** (5–3)	Vodnik (3–2)	**Díaz** (14)	Coors Field (30,673)	60–54
115	August 8	@ Rockies	9–1	**Peterson** (6–1)	Gomber (3–8)	—	Coors Field (26,379)	61–54
116	August 9	@ Mariners	0–6	Miller (9–7)	**Quintana** (6–8)	—	T-Mobile Park (34,889)	61–55
117	August 10	@ Mariners	0–4	Gilbert (7–8)	**Manaea** (8–5)	—	T-Mobile Park (31,407)	61–56
118	August 11	@ Mariners	1–12	Castillo (10–11)	**Severino** (7–6)	—	T-Mobile Park (35,460)	61–57
119	August 13	Athletics	4–9	Adams (1–2)	**Blackburn** (5–3)	—	**Citi Field** (31,293)	61–58
120	August 14	Athletics	9–1	**Peterson** (7–1)	Estes (5–5)	—	**Citi Field** (28,288)	62–58
121	August 15	Athletics	6–7	Ferguson (1–1)	**Garrett** (7–4)	Miller (18)	**Citi Field** (28,461)	62–59
122	August 16	Marlins	7–3	**Manaea** (9–5)	Muñoz (2–7)	—	**Citi Field** (32,311)	63–59
123	August 17	Marlins	4–0	**Severino** (8–6)	Meyer (3–3)	—	**Citi Field** (34,744)	64–59
124	August 18	Marlins	2–3	Nardi (3–1)	**Garrett** (7–5)	Faucher (3)	**Citi Field** (30,596)	64–60
125	August 19	Orioles	4–3	**Díaz** (4–1)	Domínguez (3–3)	—	**Citi Field** (26,874)	65–60
126	August 20	Orioles	5–9	Kremer (6–9)	**Quintana** (6–9)	—	**Citi Field** (34,225)	65–61
127	August 21	Orioles	4–3	**Díaz** (5–1)	Domínguez (3–4)	—	**Citi Field** (32,871)	66–61
128	August 22	@ Padres	8–3	**Severino** (9–6)	Cease (12–10)	—	Petco Park (41,673)	67–61
129	August 23	@ Padres	0–7	Musgrove (4–4)	**Blackburn** (5–4)	—	Petco Park (40,556)	67–62
130	August 24	@ Padres	7–1	**Peterson** (8–1)	King (11–7)	—	Petco Park (42,284)	68–62
131	August 25	@ Padres	2–3	Suárez (8–1)	**Díaz** (5–2)	—	Petco Park (41,870)	68–63
132	August 27	@ Diamondbacks	8–3	**Manaea** (10–5)	Pfaadt (8–7)	—	Chase Field (22,575)	69–63
133	August 28	@ Diamondbacks	5–8	Thompson (7–3)	**Díaz** (5–3)	Martínez (7)	Chase Field (27,059)	69–64
134	August 29	@ Diamondbacks	3–2	**Buttó** (6–3)	Martínez (5–5)	**Díaz** (15)	Chase Field (18,425)	70–64
135	August 30	@ White Sox	5–1	**Megill** (3–5)	Cannon (2–9)	—	Guaranteed Rate Field (15,288)	71–64
136	August 31	@ White Sox	5–3	**Quintana** (7–9)	Martin (0–3)	**Buttó** (3)	Guaranteed Rate Field (18,627)	72–64

September: 17–9 (Home: 11–2; Away: 6–7)

#	Date	Opponent	Box Score	Win	Loss	Save	Location (Attendance)	Record
137	September 1	@ White Sox	2–0	**Manaea** (11–5)	Crochet (6–10)	**Díaz** (16)	Guaranteed Rate Field (16,887)	73–64
138	September 2	Red Sox	4–1	**Severino** (10–6)	Bello (12–7)	**Maton** (3)	**Citi Field** (35,064)	74–64
139	September 3	Red Sox	7–2	**Peterson** (9–1)	Crawford (8–13)	—	**Citi Field** (29,400)	75–64
140	September 4	Red Sox	8–3	**D. Young** (3–0)	Houck (8–10)	—	**Citi Field** (26,270)	76–64
141	September 6	Reds	6–4 (10)	**Buttó** (7–3)	Wilson (1–5)	—	**Citi Field** (25,335)	77–64
142	September 7	Reds	4–0	**Quintana** (8–9)	Moll (3–2)	—	**Citi Field** (34,048)	78–64
143	September 8	Reds	1–3	Farmer (3–0)	**Maton** (2–3)	Díaz (26)	**Citi Field** (28,142)	78–65
144	September 9	@ Blue Jays	3–2	**Stanek** (7–3)	Nance (0–1)	**Díaz** (17)	Rogers Centre (27,470)	79–65
145	September 10	@ Blue Jays	2–6	Bassitt (10–13)	**Peterson** (9–2)	—	Rogers Centre (28,109)	79–66
146	September 11	@ Blue Jays	6–2	**D. Young** (4–0)	Green (4–6)	**Díaz** (18)	Rogers Centre (29,399)	80–66
147	September 13	@ Phillies	11–3	**Quintana** (9–9)	Nola (12–8)	—	Citizens Bank Park (44,607)	81–66
148	September 14	@ Phillies	4–6	Kerkering (5–2)	**D. Young** (4–1)	Estévez (26)	Citizens Bank Park (44,563)	81–67
149	September 15	@ Phillies	1–2	Ruiz (4–1)	**Díaz** (5–4)	—	Citizens Bank Park (44,786)	81–68
150	September 16	Nationals	2–1 (10)	**Garrett** (8–5)	Barnes (8–3)	—	**Citi Field** (21,694)	82–68
151	September 17	Nationals	10–1	**Megill** (4–5)	Parker (7–10)	—	**Citi Field** (24,932)	83–68
152	September 18	Nationals	10–0	**Quintana** (10–9)	Herz (4–8)	—	**Citi Field** (34,196)	84–68
153	September 19	Phillies	10–6	**Severino** (11–6)	Walker (3–7)	—	**Citi Field** (35,982)	85–68
154	September 20	Phillies	2–12	Sánchez (11–9)	**Peterson** (9–3)	—	**Citi Field** (41,474)	85–69
155	September 21	Phillies	6–3	**Manaea** (12–5)	Kerkering (5–3)	**Díaz** (19)	**Citi Field** (44,152)	86–69
156	September 22	Phillies	2–1	**Maton** (3–3)	Wheeler (16–7)	**Díaz** (20)	**Citi Field** (43,139)	87–69
157	September 24	@ Braves	1–5	Schwellenbach (8–7)	**Severino** (11–7)	—	Truist Park (40,103)	87–70
—	September 25	@ Braves	Postponed (Rain from Hurricane Helene); Makeup: September 30					
—	September 26	@ Braves	Postponed (Rain from Hurricane Helene); Makeup: September 30					
158	September 27	@ Brewers	4–8	Ross (3–6)	**Manaea** (12–6)	Megill (21)	American Family Field (33,996)	87–71
159	September 28	@ Brewers	0–6	Myers (9–6)	**Quintana** (10–10)	—	American Family Field (39,637)	87–72
160	September 29	@ Brewers	5–0	**Peterson** (10–3)	Rea (12–6)	—	American Family Field (33,754)	88–72
161	September 30 (1)	@ Braves	8–7	**Díaz** (6–4)	Johnson (6–6)	—	Truist Park (41,561)	89–72
162	September 30 (2)	@ Braves	0–3	**Hernández** (3–0)	Lucchesi (0–2)	**Iglesias** (34)	Truist Park (41,561)	89–73

== Postseason ==
=== Game log ===
2024 Postseason Game Log
Overall: 7–6 (Home: 3–2; Away: 4–4)
NL Wild Card Series: 2–1 (Home: 0–0; Away: 2–1)

#	Date	Opponent	Box Score	Win	Loss	Save	Location (Attendance)	Record
1	October 1	@ Brewers	8–4	Severino (1–0)	Payamps (0–1)	—	American Family Field (40,022)	1–0
2	October 2	@ Brewers	3–5	Ross (1–0)	Maton (0–1)	Williams (1)	American Family Field (40,350)	1–1
3	October 3	@ Brewers	4–2	Díaz (1–0)	Williams (0–1)	Peterson (1)	American Family Field (41,594)	2–1

NL Division Series: 3–1 (Home: 2–0; Away: 1–1)

#	Date	Opponent	Box Score	Win	Loss	Save	Location (Attendance)	Record
1	October 5	@ Phillies	6–2	Garrett (1–0)	Hoffman (0–1)	—	Citizens Bank Park (45,751)	1–0
2	October 6	@ Phillies	6–7	Hoffman (1–1)	Megill (0–1)	—	Citizens Bank Park (45,679)	1–1
3	October 8	Phillies	7–2	Manaea (1–0)	Nola (0–1)	—	Citi Field (44,093)	2–1
4	October 9	Phillies	4–1	Peterson (1–0)	Hoffman (1–2)	Díaz (1)	Citi Field (44,103)	3–1

NL Championship Series: 2–4 (Home: 1–2; Away: 1–2)

#	Date	Opponent	Box Score	Win	Loss	Save	Location (Attendance)	Record
1	October 13	@ Dodgers	0–9	Flaherty (1–1)	Senga (0–1)	—	Dodger Stadium (53,503)	0–1
2	October 14	@ Dodgers	7–3	Manaea (2–0)	Brasier (0–1)	Díaz (2)	Dodger Stadium (52,926)	1–1
3	October 16	Dodgers	0–8	Kopech (1–0)	Severino (1–1)	—	Citi Field (43,883)	1–2
4	October 17	Dodgers	2–10	Phillips (2–0)	Quintana (0–1)	—	Citi Field (43,882)	1–3
5	October 18	Dodgers	12–6	Stanek (1–0)	Flaherty (1–2)	—	Citi Field (43,841)	2–3
6	October 20	@ Dodgers	5–10	Casparius (1–0)	Manaea (2–1)	Treinen (3)	Dodger Stadium (52,672)	2–4

=== Postseason rosters ===
Playoff rosters
National League Wild Card Series

- Pitchers: 0 Adam Ottavino 23 David Peterson 32 Max Kranick 39 Edwin Díaz 40 Luis Severino 43 Huascar Brazobán 55 Ryne Stanek 59 Sean Manaea 62 José Quintana 70 José Buttó 75 Reed Garrett 81 Danny Young 88 Phil Maton
- Catchers: 4 Francisco Álvarez 13 Luis Torrens
- Infielders: 2 Luisangel Acuña 11 José Iglesias 12 Francisco Lindor 20 Pete Alonso 27 Mark Vientos
- Outfielders: 3 Jesse Winker 6 Starling Marte 9 Brandon Nimmo 15 Tyrone Taylor 44 Harrison Bader
- Designated hitters: 28 J. D. Martinez

National League Division Series

- Pitchers: 0 Adam Ottavino 23 David Peterson 34 Kodai Senga 38 Tylor Megill 39 Edwin Díaz 40 Luis Severino 55 Ryne Stanek 59 Sean Manaea 62 José Quintana 70 José Buttó 75 Reed Garrett 81 Danny Young 88 Phil Maton
- Catchers: 4 Francisco Álvarez 13 Luis Torrens
- Infielders: 2 Luisangel Acuña 11 José Iglesias 12 Francisco Lindor 20 Pete Alonso 27 Mark Vientos
- Outfielders: 3 Jesse Winker 6 Starling Marte 9 Brandon Nimmo 15 Tyrone Taylor 44 Harrison Bader
- Designated hitters: 28 J. D. Martinez

National League Championship Series

- Pitchers: 23 David Peterson 34 Kodai Senga 38 Tylor Megill 39 Edwin Díaz 40 Luis Severino 55 Ryne Stanek 59 Sean Manaea 62 José Quintana 70 José Buttó 75 Reed Garrett 81 Danny Young 88 Phil Maton
- Catchers: 4 Francisco Álvarez 13 Luis Torrens
- Infielders: 1 Jeff McNeil 2 Luisangel Acuña 11 José Iglesias 12 Francisco Lindor 20 Pete Alonso 27 Mark Vientos
- Outfielders: 3 Jesse Winker 6 Starling Marte 9 Brandon Nimmo 15 Tyrone Taylor 44 Harrison Bader
- Designated hitters: 28 J. D. Martinez

=== National League Wild Card Series ===
The Mets began their Wild Card Series matchup against the Milwaukee Brewers on October 1. The Mets took the first game by a score of 8–4, propelled by a five-run fifth inning. The Mets led Game 2 until the eighth inning, when Jackson Chourio and Garrett Mitchell hit game tying and go-ahead home runs respectively, leading to a 5–3 Brewers victory. The winner-take-all Game 3 was a scoreless affair until the bottom of the seventh inning, when pinch hitter Jake Bauers hit a solo home run off José Buttó to give the Brewers a 1–0 lead. A batter later, Sal Frelick hit a solo home run to extend the Brewers' lead to 2–0. In the top of the ninth, Pete Alonso launched a three-run home run off closer Devin Williams, scoring Francisco Lindor and Brandon Nimmo to give the Mets a 3–2 lead. Later in the inning, Starling Marte hit an RBI single to score Jesse Winker, extending the Mets' lead to 4–2. In the bottom of the ninth, David Peterson closed out the game and series by inducing a series-ending double play ball off the bat of Brice Turang to send the Mets to their first NLDS since 2015. Alonso became the first player in MLB history to hit a go-ahead home run while the team was trailing in the ninth inning or later in a winner-take-all playoff game.

=== National League Division Series ===
In the first game of the series, the Mets trailed 1–0 heading into the 8th inning against the Phillies due to a Kyle Schwarber leadoff home run. Despite that, the Mets rallied to score five runs in the eighth, winning the game 6–2. This was the third time in MLB postseason history a team made two consecutive comebacks in the eighth inning or later. In the second game, the Mets jumped out to an early lead from a Mark Vientos two-run home run. Then, the lead was extended to 3–0 by a Pete Alonso home run. However, in the sixth inning, the Phillies tied the game due to back-to-back homers by Bryce Harper and Nick Castellanos. The Mets retook the lead in the seventh inning, with Brandon Nimmo hitting a solo home run. In the bottom of the eighth inning, the Phillies retook the lead when Bryson Stott hit a two-run triple and J.T. Realmuto drove Stott home by a fielder's choice, making the score 6–4 in the Phillies' favor. In the top of the ninth, Vientos hit his second home run of the game off Matt Strahm to score two more runs for the Mets, tying the game at 6–6. In the bottom of the ninth, Castellanos hit a walk-off RBI single to score Turner for the Phillies to take Game 2 and even the series at 1–1. Following a 7–2 win against the Phillies on October 8 at home in Game 3, the Mets overcame a 1–0 deficit the next day as Francisco Lindor hit a go-ahead grand slam in the bottom of the sixth inning to secure the series win with a 4–1 victory, advancing them to the National League Championship Series.

=== National League Championship Series ===
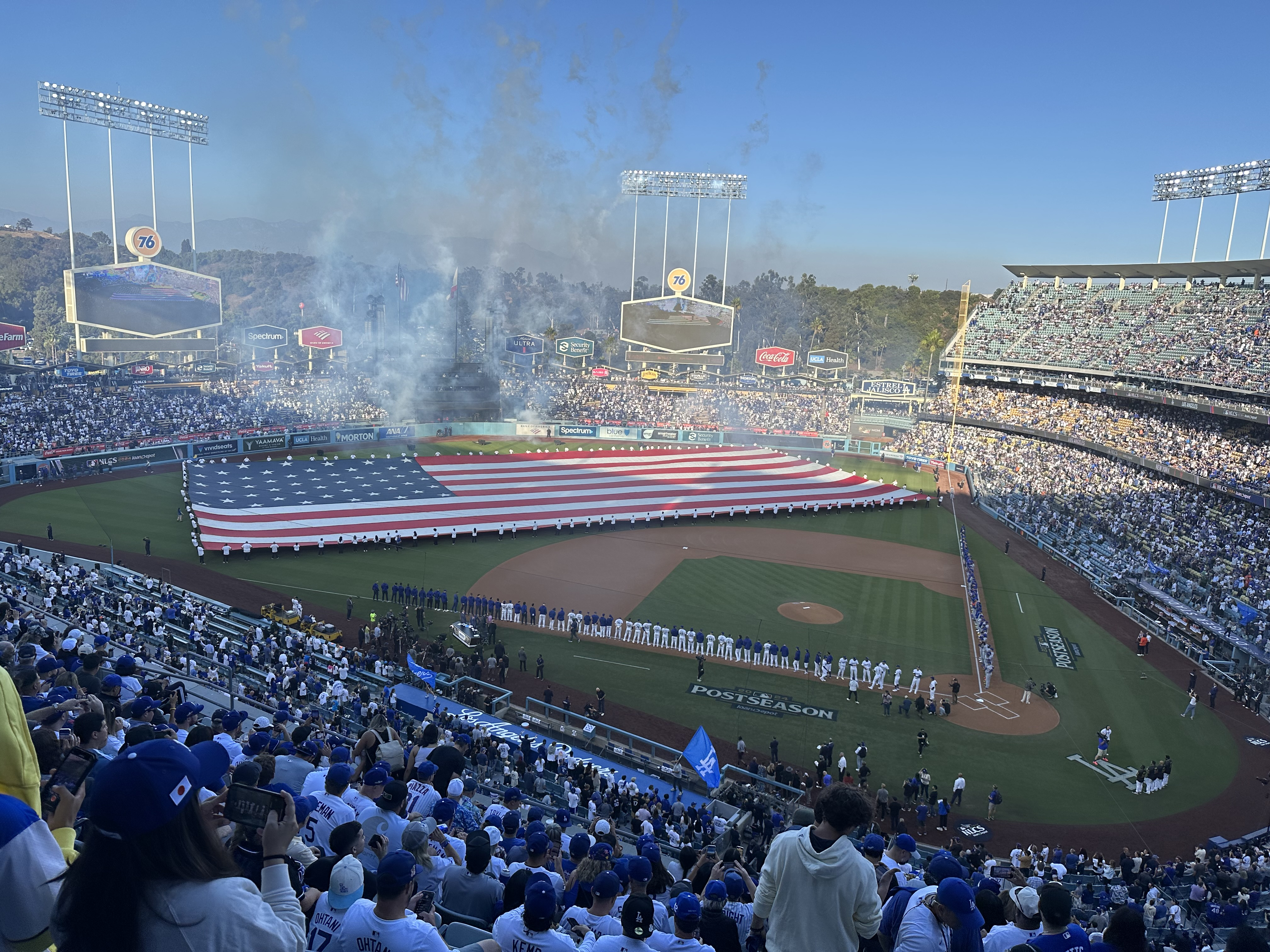
Pregame ceremonies for Game 1 of the 2024 NLCS at Dodger Stadium

On October 13, the Mets lost to the Los Angeles Dodgers in Game 1 and were shutout by a score of 9–0. In Game 2 on the following day, the Mets quickly jumped out to a 6–0 lead after a leadoff home run from Francisco Lindor and a 2nd inning grand slam by Mark Vientos. However, the Dodgers reduced the lead to 6–3 and loaded the bases in the bottom of the 6th. Vientos then turned a double play to end the inning without further damage. The Mets scored again in the top of the 9th from an RBI single by Starling Marte, leading the Mets to a 7–3 win and tying up the series at 1–1. They would then proceed to lose Game 3 by a score of 8–0 and Game 4 by a score of 10–2 at Citi Field. In their elimination game the following day, the Mets responded by winning 12–6 in Game 5 to force the series back to Los Angeles. However, the Mets were defeated by the Dodgers in Game 6 on October 20 in a 10–5 loss, ending their magical playoff run.

== Roster ==
2024 New York Mets
Roster
Pitchers: 52 Ty Adcock; 58 Paul Blackburn; 43 Huascar Brazobán; 70 José Buttó; 39 Edwin Díaz; 30 Jake Diekman; 73 Matt Festa; 75 Reed Garrett; 56 Grant Hartwig; 35 Adrian Houser; 74 Tyler Jay; 52 Jorge López; 47 Joey Lucchesi; 59 Sean Manaea; 88 Phil Maton; 38 Tylor Megill; 72 Dedniel Núñez; 53 Eric Orze; 0 Adam Ottavino; 23 David Peterson; 62 José Quintana; 25 Brooks Raley; 46 Yohan Ramírez; 71 Sean Reid-Foley; 45 Christian Scott; 34 Kodai Senga; 40 Luis Severino; 33 Drew Smith; 55 Ryne Stanek; 54 Cole Sulser; 49 Julio Teherán; 51 Michael Tonkin; 91 Josh Walker; 46 Alex Young; 81 Danny Young	Catchers: 4 Francisco Álvarez; 57 Joe Hudson; 2 Omar Narváez; 3 Tomas Nido; 13 Luis Torrens; Infielders: 2 Luisangel Acuña; 20 Pete Alonso; 26 Eddy Alvarez; 22 Brett Baty; 11 Jose Iglesias; 12 Francisco Lindor; 1 Jeff McNeil; 21 Zack Short; 27 Mark Vientos; 13 Joey Wendle	Outfielders: 44 Harrison Bader; 21 Ben Gamel; 6 Starling Marte; 9 Brandon Nimmo; 29 DJ Stewart; 15 Tyrone Taylor; 3 Jesse Winker; Other batters: 28 J. D. Martinez; 26 Pablo Reyes	Manager: 64 Carlos Mendoza; Coaches: 79 Danny Barnes (information coach); 60 Jeremy Barnes (hitting); 61 Eric Chavez (hitting); 68 John Gibbons (bench); 80 Rafael Fernandez (BP pitcher); 65 Jeremy Hefner (pitching); 66 Antoan Richardson (first base); 67 José Rosado (bullpen); 88 Mike Sarbaugh (third base); 63 Glenn Sherlock (catching)

== Player statistics ==
Updated as of 30 September 2024

= Indicates team leader (Note: To qualify as a team leader in AVG, OBP, SLG, or OPS, a player must have 3.1 plate appearances per team game.)

= Indicates league leader

=== Batting ===
Note: G = Games played; AB = At bats; R = Runs; H = Hits; 2B = Doubles; 3B = Triples; HR = Home runs; RBI = Runs batted in; BB = Walks; SO = Strikeouts; SB = Stolen bases; CS = Caught stealing; AVG = Batting average; OBP = On-base percentage; SLG = Slugging percentage; OPS = On-base plus slugging

Player	G	AB	R	H	2B	3B	HR	RBI	BB	SO	SB	CS	AVG	OBP	SLG	OPS
Francisco Álvarez	100	308	39	73	14	2	11	47	30	86	1	1	.237	.307	.403	.710
Pete Alonso	162	608	91	146	31	0	34	88	70	172	3	0	.240	.329	.459	.788
Jeff McNeil	129	424	57	101	26	0	12	44	35	68	5	1	.238	.308	.384	.692
Francisco Lindor	152	618	107	169	39	1	33	91	56	127	29	4	.273	.344	.500	.844
Mark Vientos	111	413	58	110	22	0	27	71	33	135	0	0	.266	.322	.516	.837
Brandon Nimmo	151	571	88	128	25	3	23	90	77	158	15	0	.224	.327	.399	.727
Harrison Bader	143	402	57	95	19	0	12	51	21	95	17	8	.236	.284	.373	.657
Starling Marte	94	335	46	90	13	3	7	40	27	81	16	1	.269	.327	.388	.715
J. D. Martinez	120	434	46	102	24	1	16	69	49	141	0	0	.235	.320	.406	.725
Tyrone Taylor	130	319	47	79	22	3	7	35	19	80	11	2	.248	.299	.401	.701
Jose Iglesias	85	270	39	91	16	1	4	26	12	39	6	2	.337	.381	.448	.830
DJ Stewart	74	158	16	28	4	0	5	19	31	48	1	0	.177	.325	.297	.622
Brett Baty	50	153	15	35	3	0	4	16	16	42	0	0	.229	.306	.327	.633
Luis Torrens	47	118	14	27	8	0	3	15	9	28	0	1	.229	.292	.373	.665
Jesse Winker	44	115	12	28	5	0	3	13	10	22	0	0	.243	.318	.365	.683
Tomás Nido	32	83	9	19	2	0	3	8	4	20	0	0	.229	.261	.361	.623
Omar Narváez	28	65	4	10	2	0	0	5	3	12	0	0	.154	.191	.185	.376
Luisangel Acuña	14	39	6	12	2	1	3	6	1	6	0	1	.308	.325	.641	.966
Joey Wendle	18	36	3	8	1	0	0	1	1	9	1	0	.222	.243	.250	.493
Ben Gamel	18	23	9	5	1	0	0	0	7	7	1	0	.217	.400	.261	.661
Zack Short	10	9	2	1	0	0	0	0	2	4	0	1	.111	.273	.111	.384
Eddy Alvarez	12	9	2	0	0	0	0	0	1	2	0	0	.000	.182	.000	.182
Joe Hudson	1	0	0	0	0	0	0	0	0	0	0	0	.---	.---	.---	.---
Pablo Reyes	1	0	1	0	0	0	0	0	0	0	0	0	.---	.---	.---	.---
Team totals	162	5510	768	1357	279	15	207	735	514	1382	106	22	.246	.319	.415	.734
Rank in 15 NL teams	—	6	5	7	3	14	4	5	6	8	10	3	7	6	5	5

Source: Baseball Reference

=== Pitching ===
Yellow background = team leader in category (Note: To qualify as a team leader in ERA or WHIP, a player must have 1.0 IP per team game.)

Note: W = Wins; L = Losses; ERA = Earned run average; G = Games pitched; GS = Games started; SV = Saves; IP = Innings pitched; H = Hits allowed; R = Runs allowed; ER = Earned runs allowed; HR = Home runs allowed; HBP = Hit by pitch; BB = Walks allowed (bases on balls); SO = Strikeouts; WHIP = Walks + hits per inning pitched

Player	W	L	ERA	G	GS	SV	IP	H	R	ER	HR	HBP	BB	SO	WHIP
Luis Severino	11	7	3.91	31	31	0	182.0	166	86	79	23	11	60	161	1.242
Sean Manaea	12	6	3.47	32	32	0	181.2	134	75	70	21	9	63	184	1.084
José Quintana	10	10	3.75	31	31	0	170.1	150	73	71	22	11	63	135	1.250
David Peterson	10	3	2.90	21	21	0	121.0	110	44	39	8	7	46	101	1.289
Tylor Megill	4	5	4.04	16	15	0	78.0	70	39	35	8	4	32	91	1.308
Edwin Díaz	6	4	3.52	54	0	20	53.2	36	23	21	7	3	20	84	1.043
Reed Garrett	8	5	3.77	53	0	4	57.1	50	28	24	6	2	30	83	1.395
Adam Ottavino	2	2	4.34	60	0	1	56.0	49	29	27	6	7	23	70	1.286
Danny Young	4	1	4.54	42	0	0	37.2	29	22	19	3	7	18	48	1.248
Jake Diekman	2	3	5.63	43	0	4	32.0	23	24	20	7	4	24	40	1.469
José Butto	7	3	2.55	30	7	5	74.0	41	21	21	6	5	38	79	1.068
Adrian Houser	1	5	5.84	23	7	1	69.1	74	48	45	8	4	32	45	1.529
Christian Scott	0	3	4.56	9	9	0	47.1	45	24	24	8	2	12	39	1.204
Dedniel Núñez	2	0	2.31	25	0	1	35.0	24	11	9	3	0	8	48	0.914
Phil Maton	1	1	2.51	31	0	1	28.2	18	8	8	1	4	6	30	0.837
Jorge López	1	2	3.76	28	0	2	26.1	25	13	11	3	2	11	19	1.367
Paul Blackburn	1	2	5.18	5	5	0	24.1	31	16	14	4	2	7	21	1.562
Sean Reid-Foley	1	2	1.66	23	0	0	21.2	13	10	4	0	0	14	25	1.246
Huascar Brazobán	0	1	5.14	19	0	0	21.0	18	12	12	1	1	14	17	1.524
Drew Smith	1	1	3.06	19	0	2	17.2	18	7	6	2	0	9	23	1.528
Ryne Stanek	1	0	6.06	17	0	0	16.1	13	11	11	3	1	8	23	1.286
Alex Young	0	0	3.29	14	0	0	13.2	11	5	5	2	0	7	13	1.317
Josh Walker	0	0	5.11	10	0	0	12.1	13	7	7	1	0	6	11	1.541
Joey Lucchesi	0	2	5.23	2	2	0	10.1	8	6	6	1	0	8	7	1.548
Yohan Ramírez	0	1	7.56	5	0	0	8.1	11	7	7	1	0	4	11	1.800
Brooks Raley	1	0	0.00	8	0	0	7.0	2	0	0	0	0	3	9	0.714
Michael Tonkin	1	2	5.14	5	0	0	7.0	8	10	4	1	3	2	6	1.429
Grant Hartwig	0	0	6.75	4	0	0	6.2	6	6	5	1	2	4	4	1.500
Kodai Senga	1	0	3.38	1	1	0	5.1	2	2	2	1	1	1	9	0.563
Tyler Jay	0	0	7.71	3	0	0	4.2	7	5	4	0	0	3	3	2.143
Cole Sulser	0	0	9.64	4	0	0	4.2	6	5	5	1	0	3	7	1.929
Ty Adcock	0	0	14.54	3	0	0	4.1	7	7	7	4	0	2	3	2.077
Julio Teherán	0	0	13.50	1	1	0	2.2	6	4	4	1	0	2	3	3.000
Eric Orze	0	1	21.60	2	0	0	1.2	3	4	4	1	1	2	1	3.000
Eddy Alvarez	0	0	0.00	1	0	0	1.0	1	0	0	0	1	0	1	1.000
Matt Festa	0	1	36.00	1	0	0	1.0	4	5	4	0	0	1	1	5.000
Luis Torrens	0	0	0.00	1	0	0	0.1	0	0	0	0	0	0	0	0.000
Team totals	89	73	3.96	162	162	39	1442.1	1232	697	634	165	94	586	1455	1.260
Rank in 15 NL teams	5	9	7	—	—	8	7	1	8	7	3	—	15	2	—

Source: Baseball Reference

== Farm system ==
Level	Team	League	Manager
AAA	Syracuse Mets	International League	Dick Scott
AA	Binghamton Rumble Ponies	Eastern League	Reid Brignac
High-A	Brooklyn Cyclones	South Atlantic League	Gilbert Gómez
Low-A	St. Lucie Mets	Florida State League	Yucary De La Cruz
Rookie	FCL Mets	Florida Complex League	Danny Ortega
Rookie	DSL Mets 1	Dominican Summer League	Gilberto Mejía
Rookie	DSL Mets 2	Dominican Summer League	Félix Fermín
