= Reed Garrett =

American baseball player (born 1993)

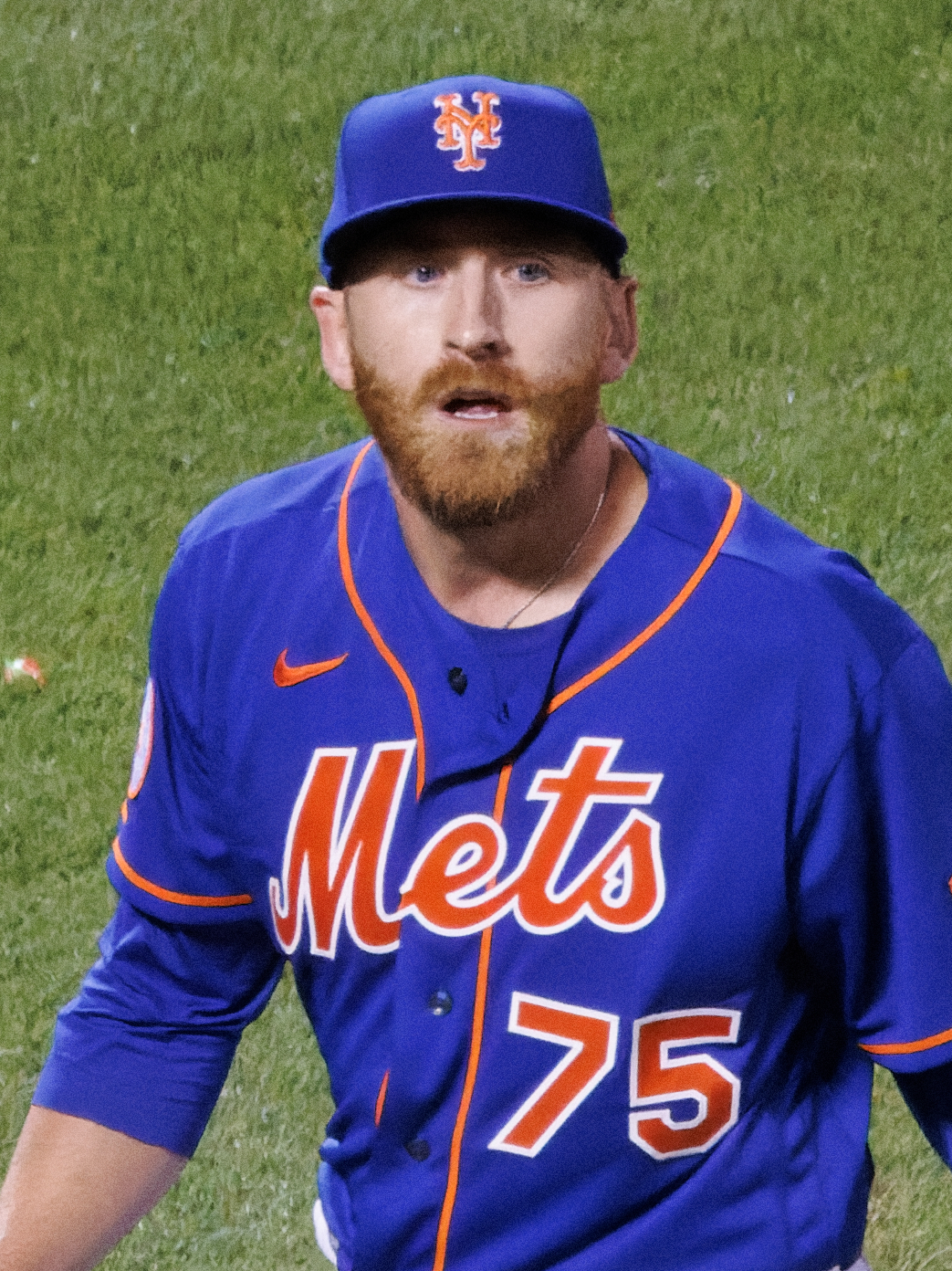
- Garrett with the Mets in 2023

New York Mets – No. 75
- Pitcher
- Born: January 2, 1993 (age 33); Henrico, Virginia, U.S.
- Bats: Right Throws: Right

Professional debut
- MLB: March 29, 2019, for the Detroit Tigers
- NPB: June 19, 2020, for the Saitama Seibu Lions

MLB statistics (through 2025 season)
- Win–loss record: 12–12
- Earned run average: 4.76
- Strikeouts: 179

NPB statistics (through 2021 season)
- Win-loss record: 7–5
- Earned run average: 3.46
- Strikeouts: 104
- Stats at Baseball Reference

Teams
- Detroit Tigers (2019); Saitama Seibu Lions (2020–2021); Washington Nationals (2022); Baltimore Orioles (2023); New York Mets (2023–2025)

Reed Garrett (born January 2, 1993) is an American professional baseball pitcher for the New York Mets of Major League Baseball (MLB). He has previously played in MLB for the Detroit Tigers, Washington Nationals, Baltimore Orioles, and in Nippon Professional Baseball (NPB) for the Saitama Seibu Lions. He made his MLB debut in 2019.

== Career ==
=== Amateur career ===
Garrett attended Mills E. Godwin High School in Richmond, Virginia. He attended the Virginia Military Institute and played college baseball for the Keydets from 2012 through 2014.

=== Texas Rangers ===
The Texas Rangers selected Garrett in the 16th round, 486th overall, of the 2014 MLB draft.

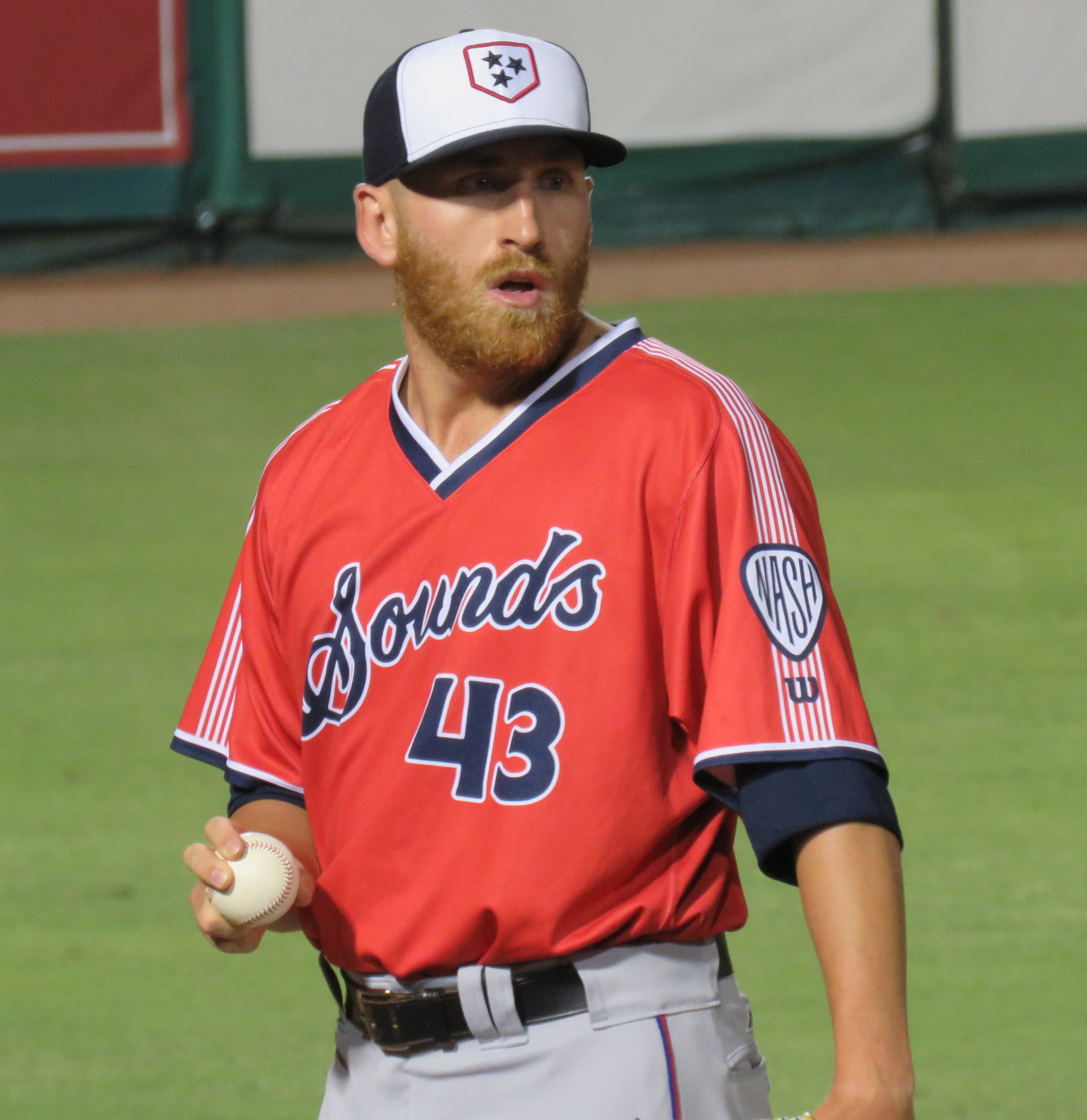
Garrett with the Nashville Sounds in 2019

Garrett spent his professional debut season of 2014 with the Spokane Indians of the Low–A Northwest League, posting a 6–1 record with a 4.06 ERA and 46 strikeouts in 57 2/3 innings over 16 games (nine starts). Garrett split the 2015 season between the Hickory Crawdads of the Single–A South Atlantic League and the High Desert Mavericks of the High–A California League, combining to go 10–8 with a 4.58 ERA, 96 strikeouts, and 139 2/3 innings pitched over 25 games (25 starts). He split the 2016 season between High Desert, the Frisco RoughRiders of the Double-A Texas League, and the Round Rock Express of the Triple-A Pacific Coast League. He recorded a combined 4–9 record with a 6.24 ERA, 86 strikeouts, and 109 2/3 innings pitched over 29 games (18 starts). After the 2016 regular season, Garrett played for the Surprise Saguaros of the Arizona Fall League. He recorded a 2.25 ERA in 16 innings pitched.

Garrett spent the 2017 season with Frisco, posting a 2–5 record with a 4.98 ERA, 70 strikeouts, and 68 2/3 innings pitched across 44 appearances (four starts). In 2018, Garrett became a full time relief pitcher and split the season between Frisco and the Round Rock Express of the Triple-A Pacific Coast League, posting a combined 4–2 record with a 2.04 ERA, 61 strikeouts, and 61 2/3 innings pitched over 51 games. Following the 2018 regular season, Garrett pitched for the Naranjeros de Hermosillo of the Mexican Pacific League in winter ball, appearing in four games and recording a 9.82 ERA over 3 2/3 innings pitched.

=== Detroit Tigers ===
On December 13, 2018, Garrett was selected by the Detroit Tigers with the fifth pick in the Rule 5 draft. On March 27, 2019, the Tigers announced that Garrett had made the team's Opening Day roster. He made his major league debut on March 29 against the Toronto Blue Jays, recording one strikeout over one inning of relief. He was designated for assignment on May 16 after struggling to a 8.22 ERA over 15 innings.

=== Texas Rangers (second stint) ===
On May 20, 2019, Garrett was returned to the Texas Rangers organization. He was then assigned to the Nashville Sounds of the Triple-A Pacific Coast League for the remainder of the season, going 1–3 with a 4.91 ERA in 40 innings.

=== Saitama Seibu Lions ===
On December 24, 2019, Garrett signed with the Saitama Seibu Lions of Nippon Professional Baseball. On June 19, 2020, Garrett made his NPB debut. He made 49 appearances for the Lions, compiling a 3-2 record and 3.10 ERA with 45 strikeouts across 49 1/3 innings pitched. On December 2, Garrett became a free agent.

On December 29, 2020, Garrett re-signed with the Lions on a one-year contract. He pitched in 61 contests for Seibu during the 2021 campaign, accumulating a 4-3 record and 3.77 ERA with 59 strikeouts and two saves across 57 1/3 innings pitched. Garrett became a free agent following the season.

=== Washington Nationals ===
On February 23, 2022, Garrett signed a minor league contract with the Washington Nationals. He was assigned to the Triple-A Rochester Red Wings to begin the year. On June 14, Garrett was selected to the 40-man roster and added to the active roster. In 7 appearances, Garrett logged a 6.75 ERA with 6 strikeouts in 9 1/3 innings pitched. He was designated for assignment following the waiver claim of Jeter Downs on December 22. On January 5, 2023, Garrett was sent outright to Triple-A, but he rejected the outright assignment and elected free agency the following day.

=== Baltimore Orioles ===
On January 19, 2023, Garrett signed a minor league contract with the Baltimore Orioles. In 19 appearances for the Triple–A Norfolk Tides, he registered a pristine 1.59 ERA with 27 strikeouts and 3 saves in 22 2/3 innings pitched. On June 14, Garrett had his contract selected to the major league roster after Austin Voth was placed on the injured list. In 2 games for Baltimore, he allowed 3 runs on 7 hits and 1 walk in 2 2/3 innings pitched. Garrett was designated for assignment by the Orioles on June 18, following the promotion of José Godoy.

=== New York Mets ===
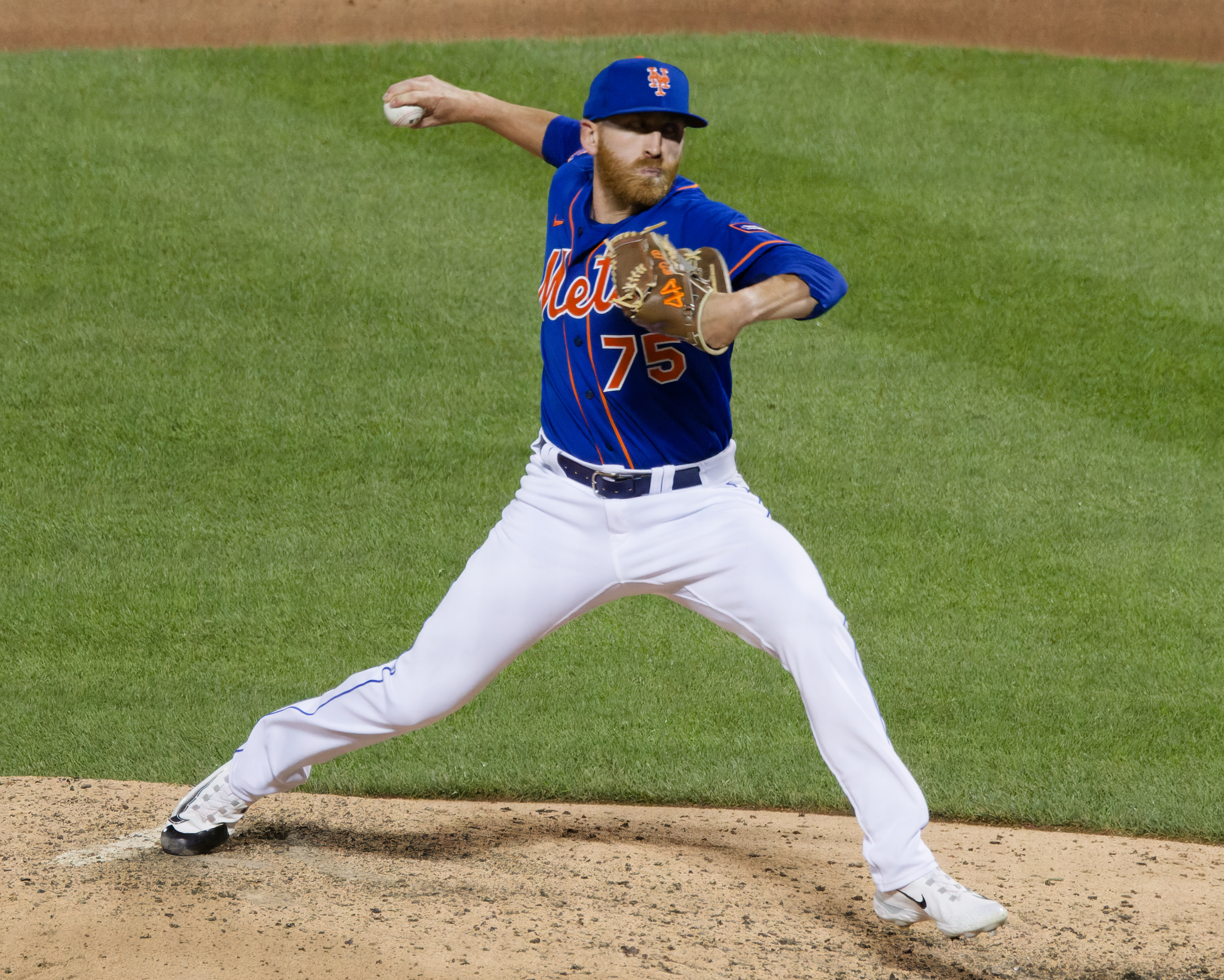
Garrett with the Mets in 2023

On June 25, 2023, Garrett was claimed off waivers by the New York Mets. In nine games for the Mets, he posted a 5.82 ERA with 16 strikeouts across 17 innings pitched. Garrett was optioned to the Triple–A Syracuse Mets to begin the 2024 season. However, he was recalled back to the majors on April 1. Despite a 5–0 record between April 4 and May 19 with two saves, four holds, 2 earned runs and 41 strikeouts during that time, his performance declined after that point, before improving in the last part of August and September. In 53 games for the Mets in 2024, Garrett posted a 3.77 ERA and 83 strikeouts across 57^{1}/_{3} innings pitched, setting a new career-high.

In 2025, Garrett posted a similar 3.90 ERA along with 64 strikeouts across 55^{1}/_{3} innings pitched. On October 9, 2025, Garrett underwent Tommy John surgery, ruling him out for the 2026 season. He was first diagnosed with elbow inflammation in August.

== See also ==
- Rule 5 draft results
