= Danny Young (pitcher, born 1994) =

American baseball player (born 1994)

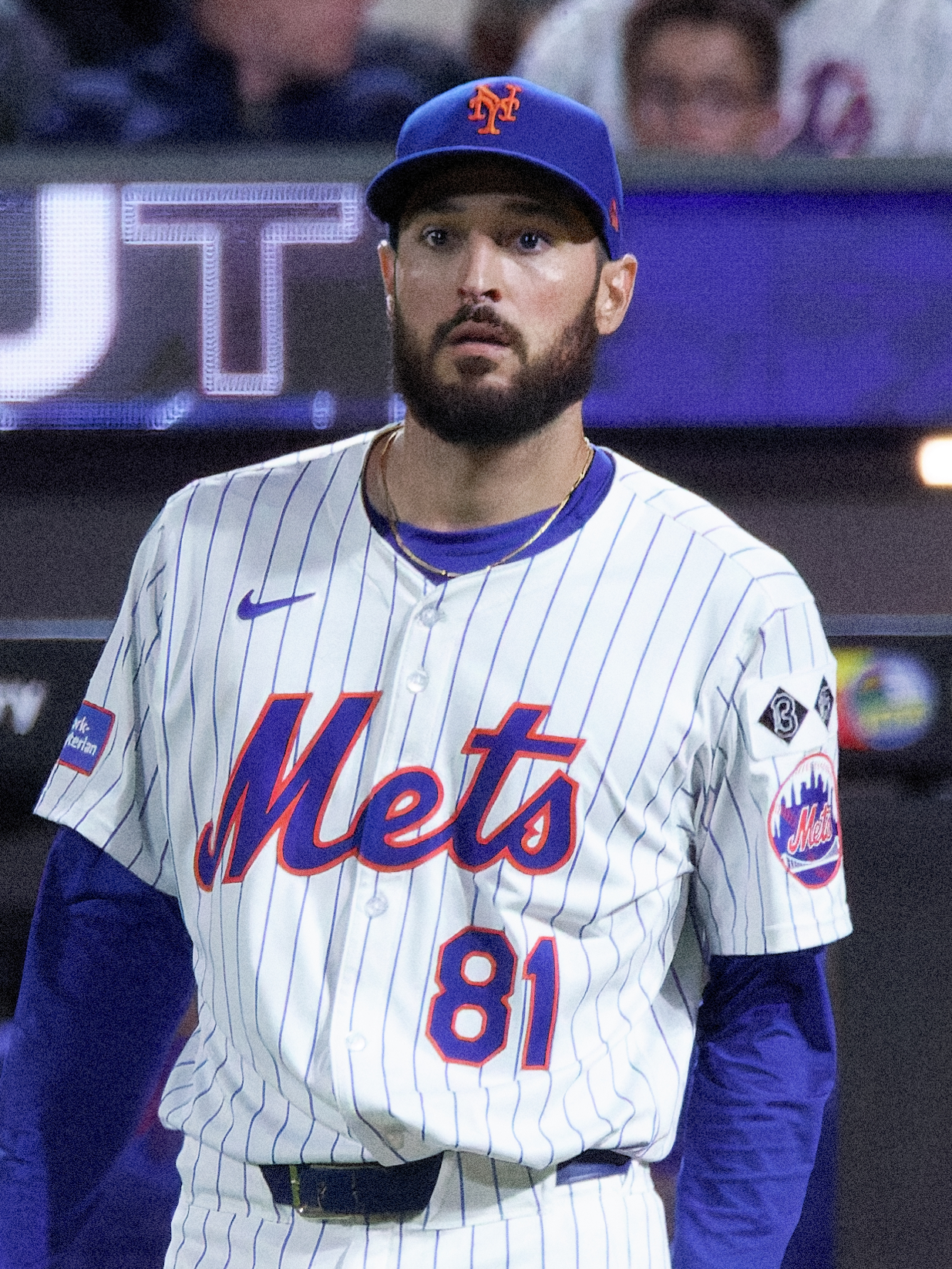
- Young with the Mets in 2024

Atlanta Braves
- Pitcher
- Born: May 27, 1994 (age 32); Boynton Beach, Florida, U.S.
- Bats: Left Throws: Left

MLB debut
- May 9, 2022, for the Seattle Mariners

MLB statistics (through 2026 season)
- Win–loss record: 4–2
- Earned run average: 4.68
- Strikeouts: 93
- Stats at Baseball Reference

Teams
- Seattle Mariners (2022); Atlanta Braves (2022–2023); New York Mets (2024–2025); Atlanta Braves (2026)

Daniel Alexander Young (born May 27, 1994) is an American professional baseball pitcher for the Atlanta Braves of Major League Baseball (MLB). He has previously played in MLB for the Seattle Mariners and New York Mets. He made his MLB debut in 2022.

== Career ==
=== Amateur career ===
Young graduated from Saint Andrew's School in Boca Raton, Florida, in 2012. He attended the University of Florida, where he played college baseball for the Florida Gators.

=== Toronto Blue Jays ===
The Toronto Blue Jays selected Young in the eighth round of the 2015 MLB draft. He made his professional debut in 2015 for the Low-A Vancouver Canadians, posting a 1-1 record and 6.33 ERA with 8 strikeouts in 27 innings pitched. In 2016, Young pitched in 21 games for the Lansing Lugnuts, recording a 2-1 record and 2.70 ERA with 18 strikeouts in 23 1/3 innings pitched.

In 2017, Young split 47 appearances between the High-A Dunedin Blue Jays and the Double-A New Hampshire Fisher Cats, posting a cumulative 4-1 record and 3.00 ERA with 50 strikeouts and 4 saves in 63.0 innings pitched. The following season, Young returned to New Hampshire, logging a 2-0 record and 4.13 ERA with 48 strikeouts in 56 2/3 innings pitched. For the 2019 season, Young made 37 appearances split between New Hampshire and the Triple-A Buffalo Bisons, pitching to a cumulative 1-2 record and 2.76 ERA with 42 strikeouts in 49 innings pitched.

=== Cleveland Indians / Guardians ===
On December 12, 2019, the Cleveland Indians selected Young in the minor league phase of the Rule 5 draft. Young did not play in a game in 2020 due to the cancellation of the minor league season because of the COVID-19 pandemic. In 2021, Young made 40 appearances for the Triple-A Columbus Clippers, logging a 2-2 record and 4.47 ERA with 58 strikeouts in 52 1/3 innings pitched. He elected free agency following the season on November 7, 2021.

=== Seattle Mariners ===
On February 9, 2022, Young signed a minor league contract with the Seattle Mariners organization. He was assigned to the Triple-A Tacoma Rainiers to begin the 2022 season.

The Mariners promoted Young to the major leagues for the first time on May 5, 2022. He made his MLB debut on May 9 in relief against the Philadelphia Phillies, recording three strikeouts. He made 2 appearances for the Mariners, recording a 7.36 ERA across 3 2/3 innings pitched. He was designated for assignment on August 1.

=== Atlanta Braves ===
On August 6, 2022, Young was claimed off waivers by the Atlanta Braves. He made one appearances for Atlanta, throwing 2 2/3 scoreless innings against the New York Mets on August 15. He was designated for assignment the following day. On August 18, he cleared waivers and was sent outright to the Triple-A Gwinnett Stripers. He made 11 appearances for Gwinnett down the stretch, posting a 3.24 ERA with 17 strikeouts in 8 1/3 innings pitched.

Young participated in major league spring training activities before the 2023 regular season began, and was assigned to minor league camp in March 2023. On April 8, the Braves selected Young's contract to the active roster. In 8 games out of Atlanta's bullpen, he logged a 1.08 ERA with 11 strikeouts in 8 1/3 innings. On July 18, Young was placed on the full–season injured list with an unspecified injury. The next day, the Braves released Young from the roster.

On July 24, Young re-signed with the Braves on a minor league contract. In 16 games for Triple–A Gwinnett, he struggled to a 6.32 ERA with 18 strikeouts across 15 2/3 innings pitched. Young elected free agency following the season on November 6.

=== New York Mets ===
On January 12, 2024, Young signed a minor league contract with the New York Mets. In 6 games for the Triple–A Syracuse Mets, he logged a 1.13 ERA with 12 strikeouts across 8 innings of work. On April 28, the Mets selected Young's contract, adding him to the major league roster. In 42 games for New York in 2024, he posted a 4.54 ERA with 48 strikeouts across 37^{2}/_{3} innings pitched. In Game 1 of the 2024 National League Championship Series, Young made his postseason debut, pitching a scoreless 1^{1}/_{3} innings.

Young made 10 appearances for New York in 2025, recording a 4.32 ERA with 13 strikeouts across 8 1/3 innings pitched. On May 4, 2025, it was announced that Young would require Tommy John surgery, ending his season. On November 21, he was non-tendered by the Mets and became a free agent.

=== Atlanta Braves (second stint) ===
On December 2, 2025, Young signed a one-year, split contract with the Atlanta Braves. He was transferred to the 60-day injured list on April 11, 2026, as he continued to recover from surgery. On July 3, the Braves activated Young for his season debut. In 16 appearances for the Braves, he posted an 8.03 ERA with 15 strikeouts over 12 1/3 innings. On August 16, Young was designated for assignment by Atlanta. He cleared waivers and was sent outright to Triple–A Gwinnett on August 23. On October 9, Young's contract was selected by the Braves.

== See also ==
- Rule 5 draft results
