= David Peterson (baseball) =

American baseball player (born 1995)

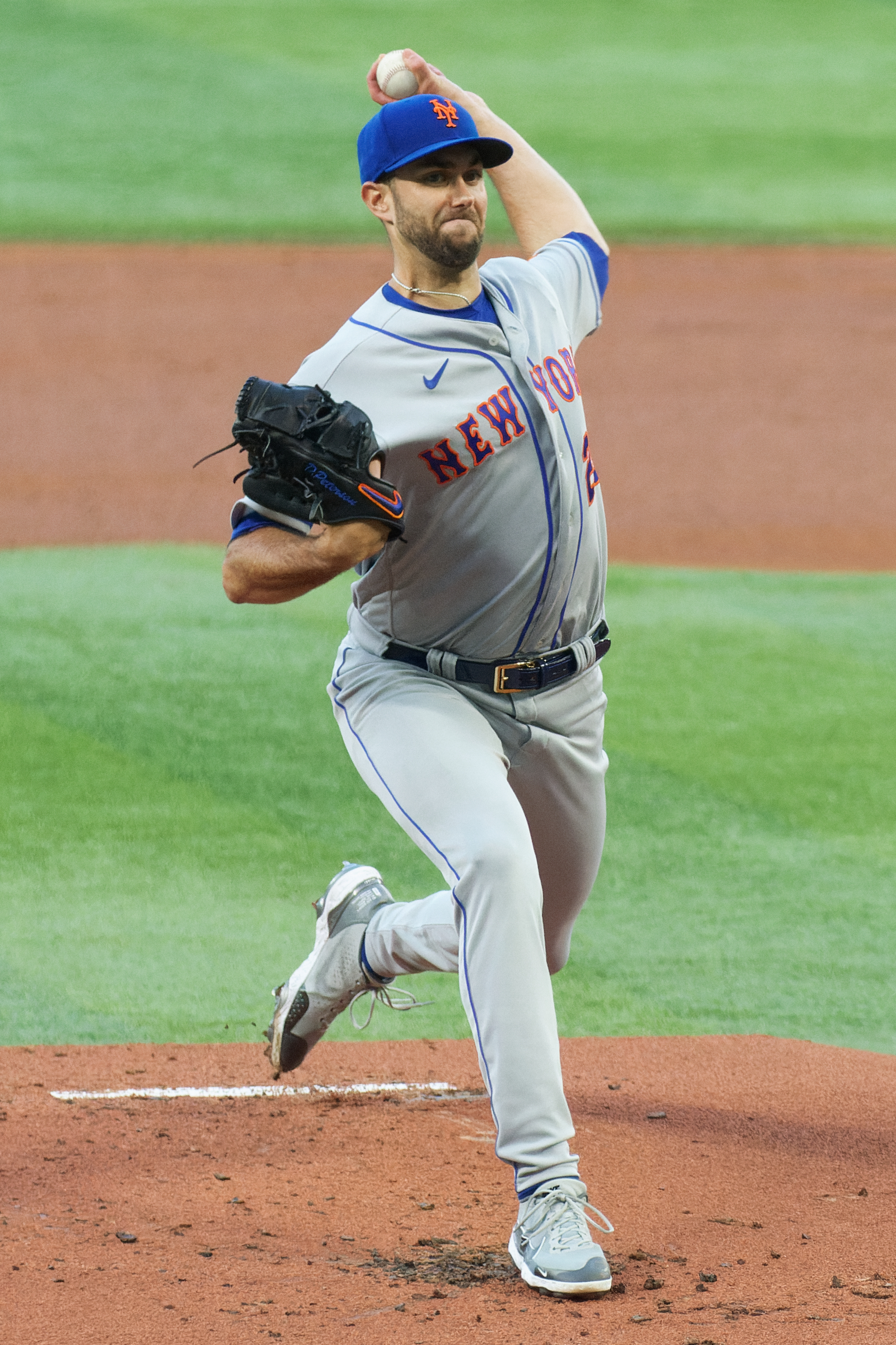
- Peterson with the Mets in 2023

Free agent
- Pitcher
- Born: September 3, 1995 (age 31); Denver, Colorado, U.S.
- Bats: Left Throws: Left

MLB debut
- July 28, 2020, for the New York Mets

MLB statistics (through 2026 season)
- Win–loss record: 46–38
- Earned run average: 4.25
- Strikeouts: 751
- Stats at Baseball Reference

Teams
- New York Mets (2020–2026); Chicago Cubs (2026)

Career highlights and awards
- All-Star (2025)

David John Peterson (born September 3, 1995) is an American professional baseball pitcher who is a free agent. He has played in Major League Baseball (MLB) for the New York Mets and Chicago Cubs. He made his MLB debut in 2020 with the Mets and was an All-Star in 2025.

== Early life and amateur career ==
Peterson's parents, Shannon and Doug, divorced when Peterson was a child. Peterson spent much of his childhood in stables with his father, a horse trainer who trained the likes of Seattle Slew. When Peterson was nine years old, his father died of an accidental drug overdose. Between eighth grade and his freshman year of high school, he grew ten inches.

Peterson attended Regis Jesuit High School in Aurora, Colorado. In 2013, he played in the Under Armour All-America Baseball Game at Wrigley Field. Before his senior year, he broke his fibula during a basketball game, underwent surgery and missed his entire senior baseball season. As a result, he fell to the 28th round of the 2014 MLB draft. Peterson chose not to sign with the Boston Red Sox and instead enrolled at the University of Oregon, where he played college baseball for the Ducks.

Peterson started 14 games as a freshman at Oregon in 2015, going 4–6 with a 4.39 earned run average (ERA) and 81 strikeouts. As a sophomore in 2016, he went 4–5 with a 3.63 ERA and 61 strikeouts over 13 starts. During the summer, he played for the United States national collegiate team. Peterson became Oregon's number one starter in 2017. On March 3, he set a school record with 17 strikeouts, breaking the previous record of 14 held by Tyler Anderson. On April 29, he broke his record after recording 20.

== Professional career ==
=== Minor leagues (2017–2020) ===
The New York Mets selected Peterson with the 20th pick in the first round of the 2017 MLB draft. He signed and was assigned to the Brooklyn Cyclones, where he spent the whole season, posting a 2.45 ERA in three games.

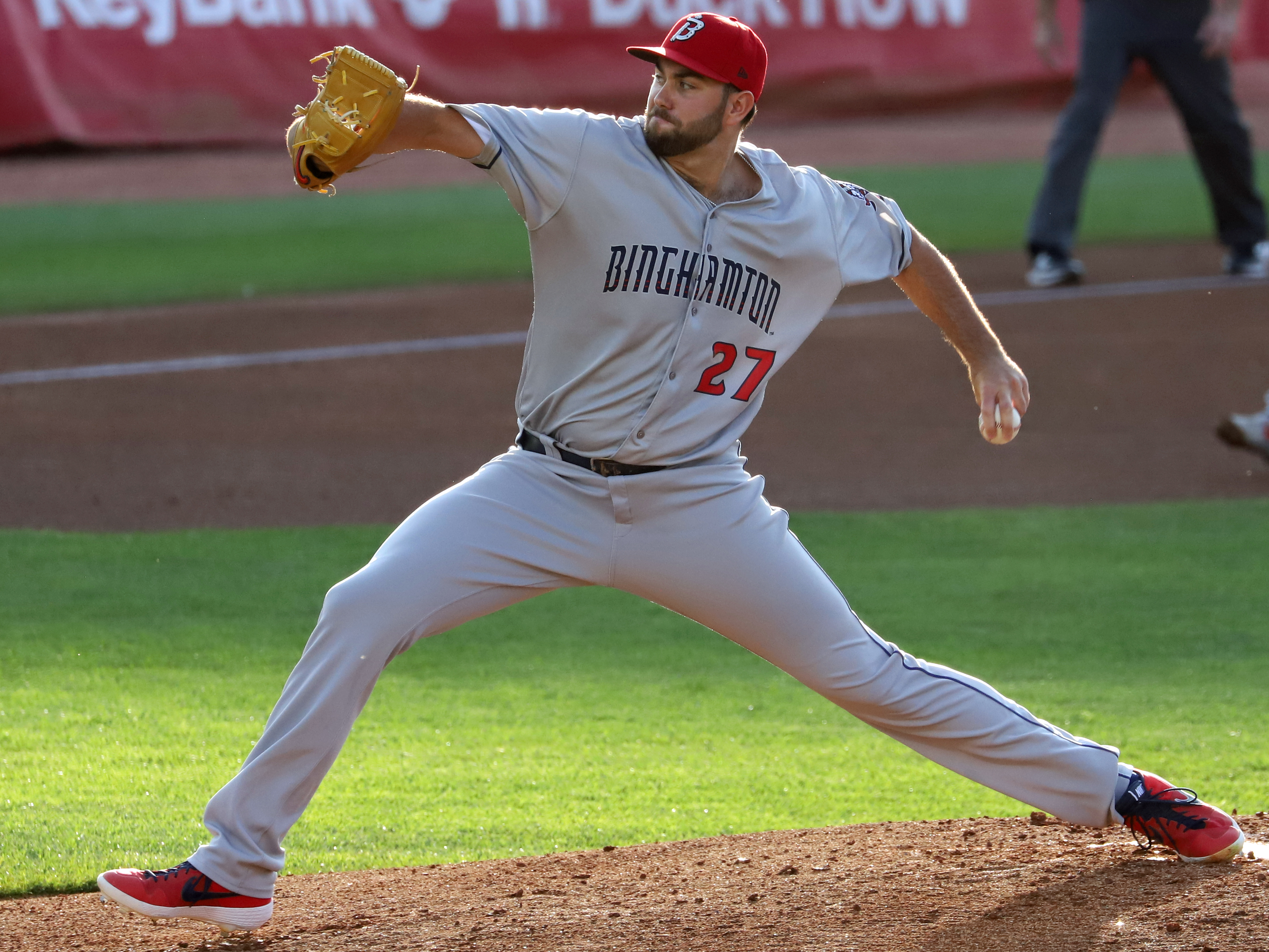
Peterson with the Binghamton Rumble Ponies in 2019

MLB.com ranked Peterson as New York's second-best prospect going into the 2018 season. He began 2018 with the Columbia Fireflies and was promoted to the St. Lucie Mets in June. In 22 total starts between the two teams, he went 7–10 with a 3.16 ERA. He spent 2019 with the Binghamton Rumble Ponies, going 3–6 with a 4.19 ERA over 24 starts, striking out 122 batters over 116 innings.

=== New York Mets ===
==== 2020 ====
The Mets promoted Peterson to the major leagues on July 28, 2020. He made his major league debut that day, against the Boston Red Sox at Fenway Park, getting the win after pitching 5 2/3 innings, giving up two runs on seven hits, an error with two walks and three strikeouts in 78 pitches. After the start, Peterson described it as "one of the greatest days of" his life.

Peterson was placed on the 10-day injured list before his start against the Miami Marlins on August 18, due to left shoulder fatigue, an issue that had arisen following his outing against the Washington Nationals on August 13. He returned to the active roster two weeks later and finished the season 6–2 with a 3.44 ERA over 10 games (9 starts).

==== 2021 ====
On June 19, 2021, during a victory against the Washington Nationals, Peterson recorded the 100th strikeout of his career. On July 2, Peterson was placed on the injured list with an oblique strain. On July 24, Peterson was transferred to the 60-day IL. He finished the year having made 15 starts with a 2–6 record, 5.54 ERA, and 69 strikeouts across 66 2/3 innings of work.

==== 2022 ====
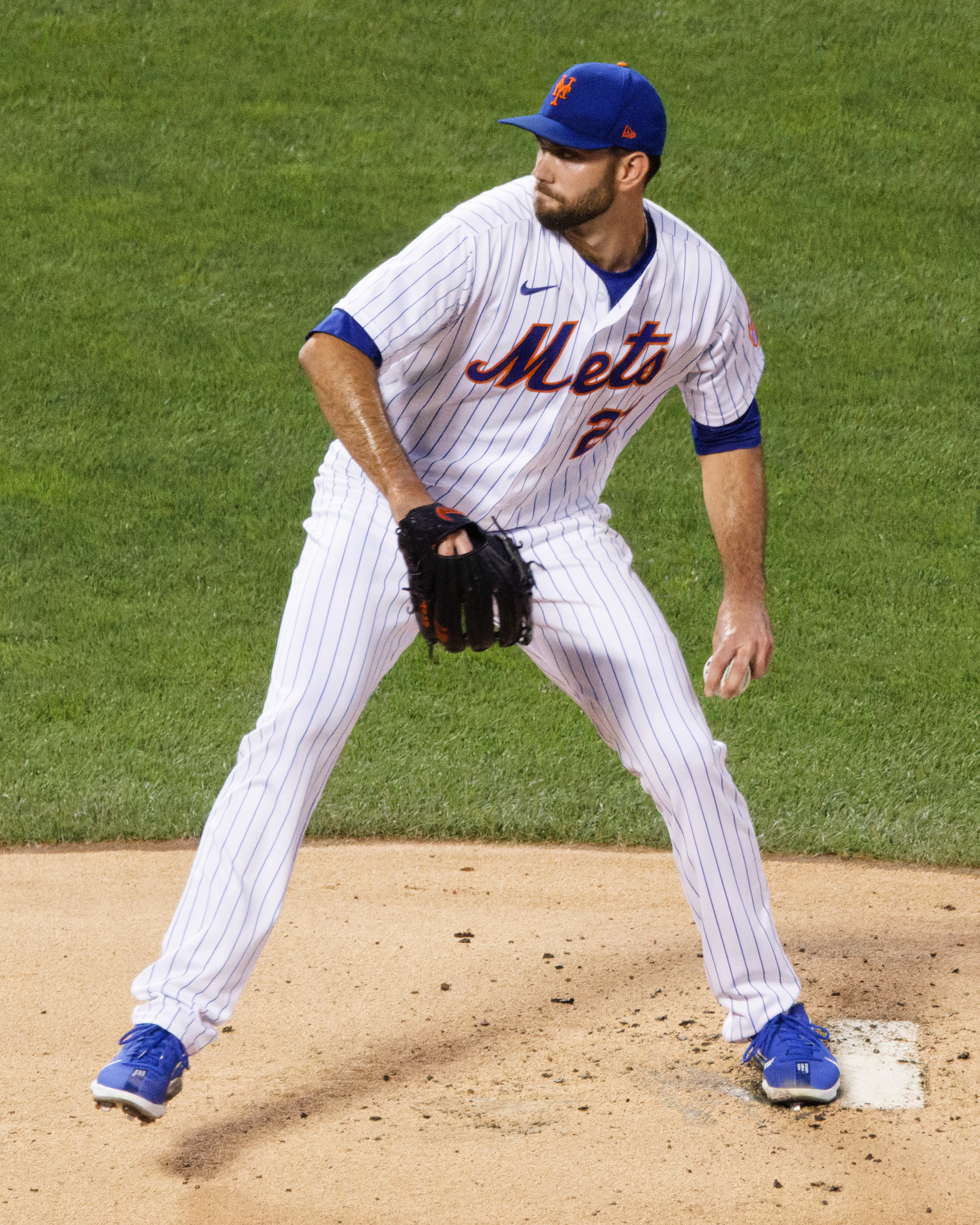
Peterson with the Mets in 2022

In 2022, Peterson made 28 appearances (19 starts) for the Mets, registering a 7–5 record and 3.83 ERA with 126 strikeouts across 105 2/3 innings pitched.

==== 2023 ====
Peterson made 27 appearances (21 starts) for New York in 2023, pitching to a 3–8 record, a 5.03 ERA, and a career–high 128 strikeouts in 111 innings of work. Following the season on November 8, 2023, Peterson underwent surgery to repair a damaged labrum in his left hip, with an expected recovery time of 6–7 months.

==== 2024 ====
On May 29, 2024, the Mets activated Peterson from the injured list for his season debut. On September 3, he struck out a career-high 11 batters on his 29th birthday in a 7–2 Mets victory over the Boston Red Sox. In 2024, Peterson made 21 starts for the Mets, posting a 10–3 record, a career-low 2.90 ERA, and 101 strikeouts in 121 innings pitched.

On October 3, Peterson pitched a scoreless 9th inning against the Milwaukee Brewers in Game 3 of the 2024 National League Wild Card Series to record the first save of his professional career. On October 9, Peterson earned his first postseason win after pitching 2.1 innings of scoreless ball against the Philadelphia Phillies in Game 4 of the National League Division Series. He recorded 8 strikeouts with a 2.92 ERA across 12^{1}/_{3} innings of the 2024 postseason.

==== 2025 ====
On May 6, 2025, Peterson recorded his 500th career strikeout when he struck out José Herrera in the bottom of the 6th inning against the Arizona Diamondbacks. On June 11, Peterson threw his first career complete game shutout, allowing 6 hits, no walks and striking out 6 batters in the Mets' 5–0 win over the Washington Nationals. The last Mets left-hander to accomplish the feat was Steven Matz in July 2019.

On July 10, Peterson was named to the 2025 All-Star Game as a reserve, replacing Robbie Ray on the National League roster. At the time, Peterson had recorded a 6–4 record with a 3.06 ERA and 93 strikeouts across 18 starts. As the season progressed, Peterson struggled, posting a 12.54 ERA across his last five games of the year, and an 8.42 ERA in his final nine games. With 30 starts in 2025, Peterson posted a 9–6 record with a 4.22 ERA, and set new career-highs with 150 strikeouts across 168 2/3 innings pitched. He was also named a Gold Glove Award finalist.

==== 2026 ====
Peterson pitched to a 6.41 ERA in his first four starts of the 2026 season, prompting the Mets to use an opener in Peterson's games. The Mets moved him out of the starting rotation on April 21 when they promoted Christian Scott from the minor leagues, but an injury to Kodai Senga returned Peterson to the starting rotation. On May 29, the Mets again removed Peterson from the starting rotation, replacing him with Sean Manaea. Peterson made eight starts in 16 total appearances for the Mets in 2026, pitching to a 3–6 record with a 6.09 ERA and 63 strikeouts.

=== Chicago Cubs ===
On June 25, 2026, Peterson was traded to the Chicago Cubs in exchange for minor leaguer Cole Mathis. On June 27, he made his team debut, allowing two earned runs across 5 2/3 innings pitched en route to his first win with the Cubs in an 8–2 victory over the Milwaukee Brewers. Peterson made 15 starts in 16 total appearances for the Cubs in 2026, pitching to a 6–2 record with a 3.70 ERA and 74 strikeouts. He pitched 1 2/3 scorless innings during Game 2 of the 2026 National League Wild Card Series, though the Cubs were swept in two games.
