= Pablo Reyes =

Dominican baseball player (born 1993)

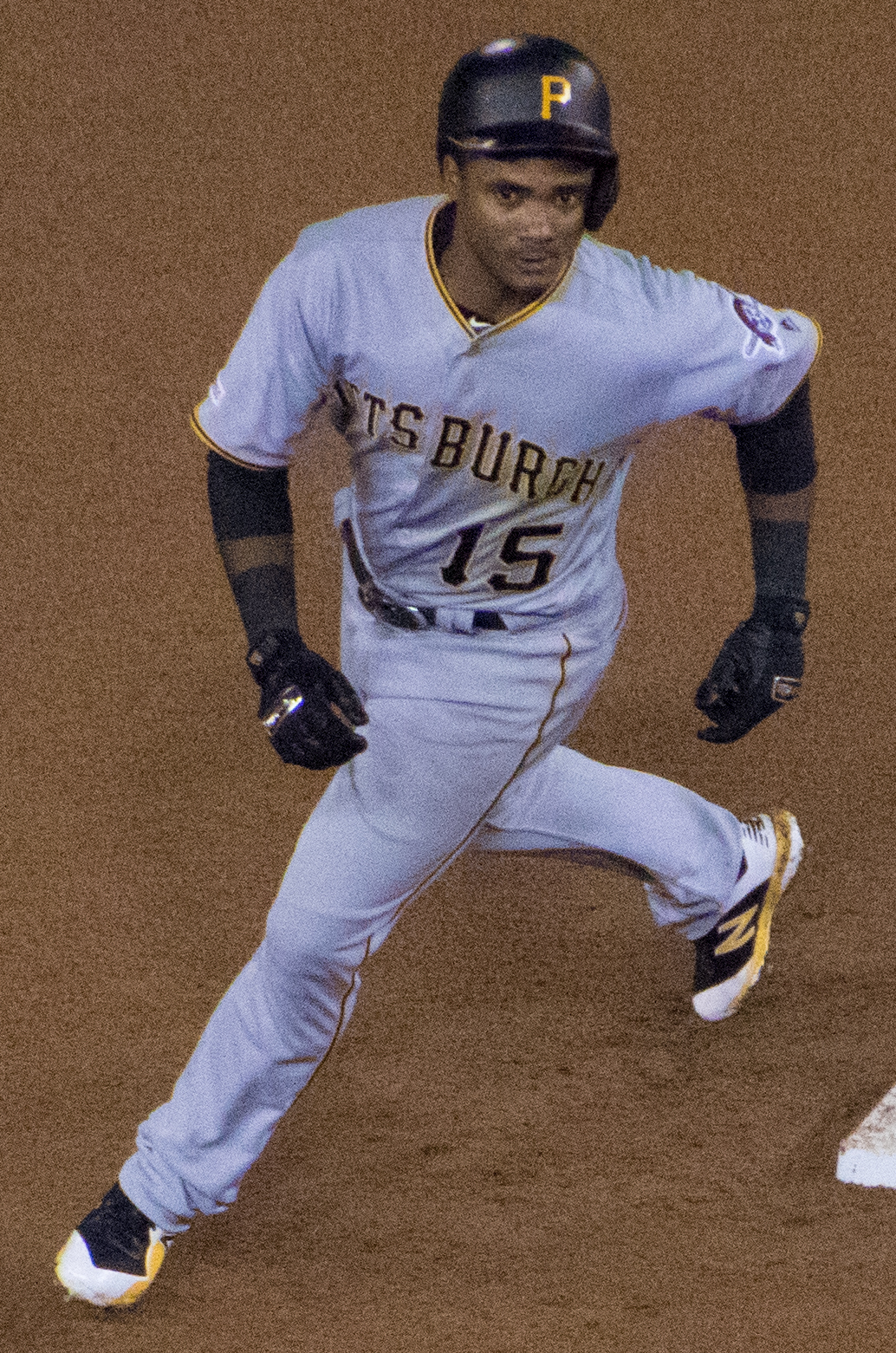
- Reyes with the Pittsburgh Pirates in 2019

Free agent
- Outfielder / Infielder
- Born: September 5, 1993 (age 33); Santo Domingo, Dominican Republic
- Bats: Right Throws: Right

MLB debut
- September 2, 2018, for the Pittsburgh Pirates

MLB statistics (through 2025 season)
- Batting average: .245
- Home runs: 8
- Runs batted in: 56
- Stats at Baseball Reference

Teams
- Pittsburgh Pirates (2018–2019); Milwaukee Brewers (2021–2022); Boston Red Sox (2023–2024); New York Mets (2024); New York Yankees (2025)

Pablo Israel Reyes (born September 5, 1993) is a Dominican professional baseball infielder and outfielder who is a free agent. He has previously played in Major League Baseball (MLB) for the Pittsburgh Pirates, Milwaukee Brewers, Boston Red Sox, New York Yankees, and New York Mets. He made his MLB debut in 2018.

== Career ==
=== Pittsburgh Pirates ===
Reyes signed with the Pittsburgh Pirates as an international free agent on May 31, 2012. He spent the 2012 season with the Dominican Summer League Pirates, hitting .284/.368/.399 with one home run and 23 RBI. He repeated with the DSL Pirates in 2013, hitting .304/.376/.429 with three home runs and 28 RBI. Reyes spent the 2014 season with the rookie–level Bristol Pirates, hitting .272/.367/.367 with two home runs and 16 RBI. Reyes spent the 2015 season with the Single–A West Virginia Power, hitting .268/.345/.438 with 12 home runs and 60 RBI. He spent the 2016 season with the High–A Bradenton Marauders, hitting .265/.341/.386 with five home runs and 45 RBI. Reyes hit .274/.356/.410 with 10 home runs and 50 RBI for the Double–A Altoona Curve in 2017. Reyers split the 2018 minor league season between Altoona and the Triple–A Indianapolis Indians, hitting a combined .284/.337/.421 with eight home runs and 41 RBI.

On September 1, 2018, the Pirates selected Reyes' contract and called him up to the majors leagues for the first time. In 13 games with the Pirates, he hit .293/.349/.483 with three home runs and seven RBI.

Reyes made the Pirates' Opening Day roster in 2019, and hit .203/.274/.322 with two home runs and 17 RBI over 71 games. Reyes was designated for assignment on January 9, 2020, following the signing of Guillermo Heredia. He was suspended by MLB for the first 80 games of the 2020 season due to the use of a performance-enhancing drug (PED). The minor league season was cancelled as a result of the COVID-19 pandemic. Reyes became a free agent on November 2.

=== Milwaukee Brewers ===
On January 7, 2021, Reyes signed a minor league contract with the Milwaukee Brewers organization. On April 26, Reyes was selected to the active roster. In 53 games for the Brewers in 2021, Reyes batted .256/.333/.359 with 1 home run, 3 RBI, and 4 stolen bases.

In 2022, Reyes appeared in only 5 games for Milwaukee, going 4–for–15 (.267) with no home runs or RBI. On October 28, 2022, he was removed from the 40-man roster and sent outright to the Triple–A Nashville Sounds. Reyes elected free agency following the season on November 10.

=== Oakland Athletics ===
On November 19, 2022, Reyes signed a minor league contract with the Oakland Athletics organization. He was assigned to the Triple-A Las Vegas Aviators to begin the 2023 season, where he played in 21 games and batted .257/.385/.351 with 1 home run, 10 RBI, and 3 stolen bases.

=== Boston Red Sox ===
On May 12, 2023, Reyes was traded to the Boston Red Sox in exchange for cash considerations. The following day, his contract was selected to the active roster. Reyes immediately provided stability at the shortshop position for the Red Sox, as well as a decent showing at the plate. He was with Boston until June 23, when he was placed on the injured list with an abdominal strain. He was activated from the injured list on July 24. Reyes hit his first career grand slam, a walk-off, in a 6–2 win against the Kansas City Royals on August 7. On August 28, Reyes was again added to the injured list, due to left elbow inflammation; he rejoined the team on September 12.

Struggling to start the 2024 season, Reyes only hit .183 in 21 games with the Red Sox, and was designated for assignment on April 29, 2024. He cleared waivers and was sent outright to the Triple–A Worcester Red Sox on May 6.

=== New York Mets ===
On May 25, 2024, Reyes was traded to the New York Mets in exchange for cash considerations. In 58 games for the Triple–A Syracuse Mets, he batted .283/.361/.478 with 10 home runs and 35 RBI. The Mets selected his contract on September 1, adding him to the team's major league roster when all rosters expanded. Reyes's only action for the Mets came when he was inserted as a pinch runner, and went on to score a run. On September 9, without making a single plate appearance, Reyes was designated for assignment by the Mets. He cleared waivers and was sent outright to Syracuse on September 13. Reyes elected free agency on October 21.

=== New York Yankees ===
On November 12, 2024, Reyes signed a minor league contract with the New York Yankees. On March 27, 2025, the Yankees selected Reyes' contract after he made the team's Opening Day roster. In 24 appearances for the Yankees, he batted .194/.242/.226 with two RBI and one stolen base. Reyes was designated for assignment by the Yankees on June 16. He elected free agency rather than accept an outright assignment to the Triple-A Scranton/Wilkes-Barre RailRiders on June 19.

=== New York Mets (second stint) ===
On June 21, 2025, Reyes signed a minor league contract with the New York Mets. In 44 appearances for the Triple-A Syracuse Mets, he batted .289/.385/.484 with six home runs, 25 RBI, and four stolen bases. Reyes was released by the Mets organization on August 29.

=== San Diego Padres ===
On November 6, 2025, Reyes signed a minor league contract with the San Diego Padres. He made 56 appearances for the Triple–A El Paso Chihuahuas, slashing .310/.408/.491 with six home runs, 33 RBI, and 15 stolen bases. Reyes was released by the Padres organization on July 2, 2026.

=== Los Angeles Angels ===
On July 8, 2026, Reyes signed a minor league contract with the Los Angeles Angels. In 44 games with Triple-A Salt Lake Bees he batted .357/.437/.506 with 4 home runs, 31 RBIs and 6 stolen bases. He elected free agency on November 2.

== Personal life ==
His younger brother, Samuel Reyes, also plays professional baseball.
