= 2021 Boston Red Sox season =

Professional sports season in Major League Baseball

2021 Boston Red Sox
- American League Wild Card winners
- League: American League
- Division: East
- Ballpark: Fenway Park
- City: Boston, Massachusetts
- Record: 92–70 (.568)
- Divisional place: 2nd
- Owners: John W. Henry (Fenway Sports Group)
- President: Sam Kennedy
- Chief baseball officer: Chaim Bloom
- General manager: Brian O'Halloran
- Manager: Alex Cora
- Television: NESN: Dave O'Brien or Mike Monaco (play-by-play) with Jerry Remy, Dennis Eckersley, and Ellis Burks (color) (Note: NESN also announced additional broadcast personnel: Mike Monaco for play-by-play, Jahmai Webster as sideline reporter, Tom Caron as studio host, and a rotation of studio personnel including former Red Sox players Lenny DiNardo, Jonathan Papelbon, Jim Rice, Mo Vaughn, Tim Wakefield, and Kevin Youkilis.)
- Radio: WEEI-FM / Boston Red Sox Radio Network: Joe Castiglione with Will Flemming, Sean McDonough and Lou Merloni

The 2021 Boston Red Sox season was the 121st season in the team's history, and their 110th season at Fenway Park. The team entered the offseason conducting a managerial search, after declining to bring back Ron Roenicke from the shortened 2020 season. On November 6, 2020, the team re-hired Alex Cora as manager; Cora had skippered the Red Sox in 2018 and 2019, then sat out 2020 serving a one-year suspension for his role in the Houston Astros sign stealing scandal in 2017.

This was the Red Sox' first season since 2019 with fans at Fenway Park, with a limited capacity of approximately 4,500 to start the season due to the ongoing COVID-19 pandemic. The capacity was increased to approximately 9,400 for games after May 10. Fenway returned to full capacity starting May 29, with an announced attendance of 25,089 at that day's game. The first home sellout of the season was the June 25 game against the New York Yankees, with an announced attendance of 36,869.

On June 4–6, the Red Sox swept a three-game series against the rival Yankees at Yankee Stadium for the first time since June 2011. On June 13, the Toronto Blue Jays set a single-game record for home runs by a visiting team at Fenway Park, with eight. In early July, the Red Sox led MLB with five players selected to the All-Star Game. Beginning in late August, the team had a spate of positive COVID-19 testing, resulting in more than 10 players being placed on the COVID-related injured list.

The Red Sox finished the regular season with a 92–70 record and qualified for the postseason as the fourth seed in the American League (AL), defeating the fifth-seed Yankees in the AL Wild Card Game at Fenway Park on October 5. They then defeated the Tampa Bay Rays in the AL Division Series, 3–1 games. The Red Sox lost to the Houston Astros in the best-of-seven AL Championship Series in six games.

== Offseason ==
The Red Sox entered the offseason with the manager position vacant, as prior to the team's final game of the 2020 season, the team announced that Ron Roenicke would not be retained.

The Red Sox also entered the offseason with six guaranteed player contracts for 2021, totaling slightly more than $115 million: Chris Sale ($25.60 million), Xander Bogaerts ($20 million), J. D. Martinez ($19.375 million), Nathan Eovaldi ($16.88 million); Dustin Pedroia ($13.3 million), and Christian Vázquez ($4.52 million).

October–December 2020

=== October ===
- On October 12, the club declined to renew the contracts for bench coach Jerry Narron and bullpen coach Craig Bjornson.
- On October 12, MLB announced that the Red Sox would have the fourth pick in the 2021 MLB draft, their highest pick since the 1967 MLB draft.
- On October 23, pitcher Domingo Tapia was claimed off of waivers by the Seattle Mariners.
- On October 26, the team outrighted five players to Triple-A, removing them from the 40-man roster: Zack Godley, Mike Kickham, Robinson Leyer, Tzu-Wei Lin, and Andrew Triggs. Godley, Kickham, and Triggs declined their assignments, electing to become free agents.
- On October 28, three more players were outrighted to Triple-A: Dylan Covey, José Peraza, and César Puello; Peraza and Puello elected free agency.
- On October 28, Jackie Bradley Jr. and Collin McHugh elected free agency.

=== November ===
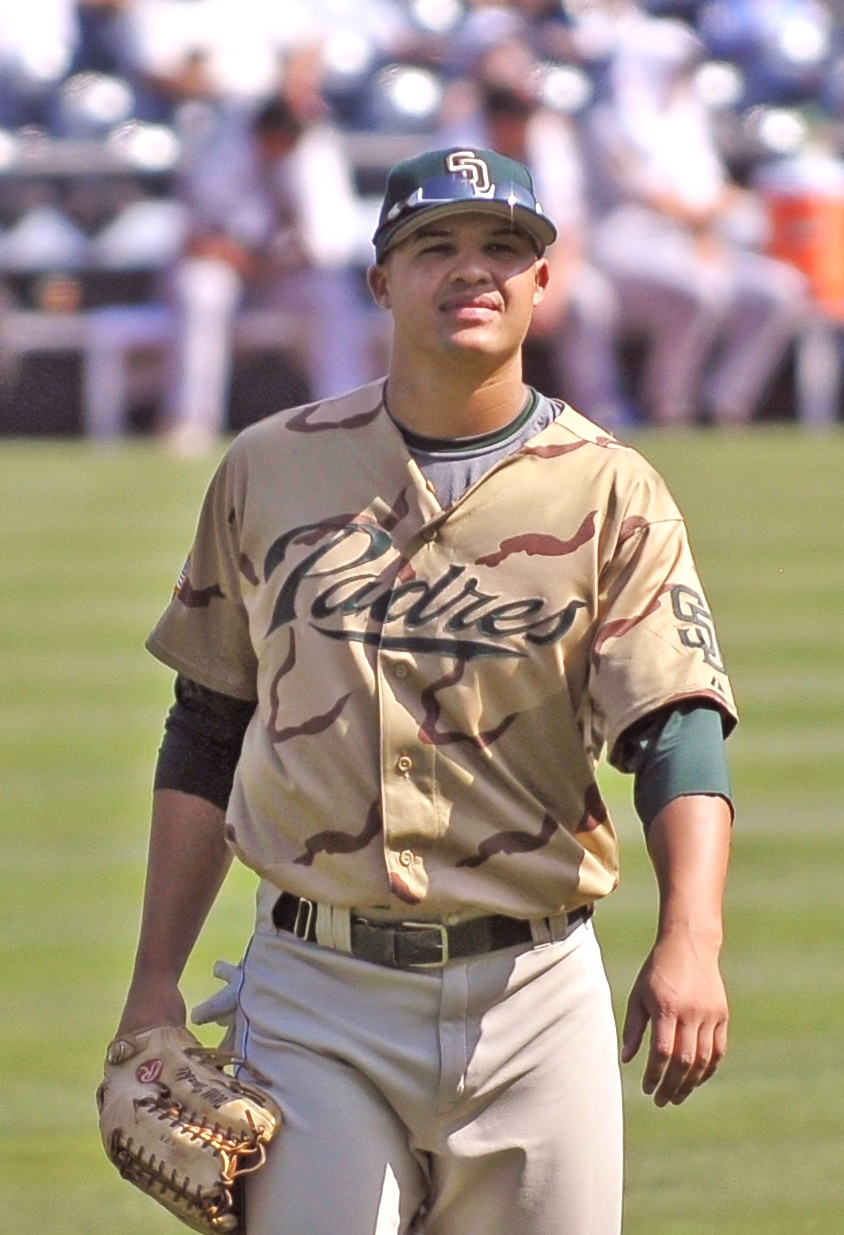
Will Venable

- On November 1, the team declined to exercise their $6.85 million option for Martín Pérez for the 2021 season, paying him a $500,000 buyout and making him a free agent.
- On November 6, Alex Cora was re-hired as the team's manager.
- On November 16, the team signed pitcher Kevin McCarthy to a minor-league contract.
- On November 17, the team signed outfielder Michael Gettys to a minor-league contract.
- On November 20, the deadline to protect players in advance of the Rule 5 draft scheduled for December, the team made multiple roster moves:
  - Three players were removed from the 40-man roster: Matt Hall and Ryan Weber were designated for assignment, and the team outrighted Kyle Hart to Triple-A.
  - Seven players were added to the 40-man roster, thus protecting them from being selected in the Rule 5 draft: Eduard Bazardo, Jay Groome, Bryan Mata, Hudson Potts, Jeisson Rosario, Connor Seabold, and Connor Wong.
- On November 20, changes to Cora's uniformed coaching staff were announced: Will Venable was added to the staff as bench coach and Jason Varitek was added as game planning coordinator; Kevin Walker, who had been assistant pitching coach, was named bullpen coach, and Ramón Vázquez, who as a coach had focused on statistical analysis and advanced scouting data, was named quality control coach and interpreter.
- On November 25, the team claimed pitcher Joel Payamps off of waivers from the Arizona Diamondbacks. In a corresponding move, pitcher Robert Stock was designated for assignment; Stock was later claimed off of waivers by the Chicago Cubs.

=== December ===
- On December 1, the team and Eduardo Rodríguez reached a one-year deal for the 2021 season, reportedly worth $8.3 million.
- On December 2, the team reached one-year deals with several players: Matt Barnes, Ryan Brasier, Austin Brice, and Kevin Plawecki.
- On December 3, the team traded minor-league pitcher Yoan Aybar to the Colorado Rockies for minor-league infielder Christian Koss; Aybar had not yet reached Double-A, but was on the Red Sox' 40-man roster.
- On December 7, Yairo Muñoz was outrighted off of the 40-man roster and assigned to Triple-A.
- On December 9, the team announced its 2021 Minor League Baseball affiliates; the Lowell Spinners, a Class A Short Season affiliate of the Red Sox since 1996, were dropped, as part of an MLB plan to reduce the total number of affiliated minor league teams.
- On December 10, the team selected pitcher Garrett Whitlock from the New York Yankees in the Rule 5 draft.
- On December 14, the team signed free agent outfielder Hunter Renfroe to a one-year contract.
- On December 23, catcher Deivy Grullón was claimed off of waivers by the Cincinnati Reds.
- On December 23, the team signed free agent Matt Andriese to a one-year contract.

January–March 2021

=== January ===
- On January 4, the team hired Bianca Smith to serve as a minor-league coach at the team's Fenway South complex, making Smith the first African American woman to serve as a coach in a professional baseball organization.
- On January 4, the team signed pitcher Daniel Gossett to a minor-league contract.
- On January 18, the team traded minor-league infielder C. J. Chatham to the Philadelphia Phillies in exchange for a player to be named later.
- On January 25, the team acquired pitcher Adam Ottavino and minor-league pitcher Frank German from the New York Yankees for cash considerations or a player to be named later.

=== February ===
- On February 1, Dustin Pedroia announced his retirement from MLB after a 14-year career, spent entirely with the Red Sox. Knee issues had limited Pedroia to a combined nine games over the 2018 and 2019 seasons, and he missed the entire 2020 season.
- On February 2, the team signed utility player Enrique "Kiké" Hernández to a two-year, $14 million contract.
- On February 3, the team signed pitcher Garrett Richards to a one-year, $10 million contract and, in a corresponding roster move, designated pitcher Joel Payamps for assignment. Payamps was later claimed off of waivers by the Toronto Blue Jays.
- On February 10, the team traded Andrew Benintendi and cash considerations to the Kansas City Royals as part of a three-team trade in which Boston acquired outfielder Franchy Cordero from the Royals, minor-league pitcher Josh Winckowski from the New York Mets, and three players to be named later.
  - On June 4, the players to be named later were identified as three prospects in the low minor leagues: outfielder Freddy Valdez from the Mets, and pitchers Grant Gambrell and Luis De La Rosa from the Royals.
- On February 12, the team re-signed pitcher Martín Pérez to a one-year, $4.5 million contract; in a corresponding move, pitcher Chris Mazza was designated for assignment.
- On February 16, the team signed free agent pitcher Hirokazu Sawamura, who previously played in Nippon Professional Baseball, to a two-year, $3 million contract; in a corresponding move, pitcher Jeffrey Springs was designated for assignment.
- On February 17, the team traded pitchers Chris Mazza and Jeffrey Springs to the Tampa Bay Rays in exchange for minor-league catcher Ronaldo Hernández and minor-league infielder Nick Sogard.
- On February 18, the team claimed pitcher John Schreiber off waivers from the Detroit Tigers. To make room on the 40-man roster, pitcher Chris Sale was placed on the 60-day injured list.
- On February 22, the team re-claimed Joel Payamps off waivers from Toronto.
- On February 24, the team signed free agent utility player Marwin González to a one-year contract; in a corresponding move, pitcher Marcus Walden was designated for assignment.

=== March ===
- On March 6, Joel Payamps was again claimed off of waivers by the Toronto Blue Jays.
- On March 7, the team signed free agent infielder Danny Santana to a minor-league contract.

=== Spring training ===
"Truck Day", when the team's equipment departs Fenway Park for spring training in Florida, was February 8. Pitchers and catchers began workouts at JetBlue Park in Fort Myers on February 18; full squad workouts began on February 22.

The team had been scheduled to begin preseason games on February 26, with an exhibition against the Northeastern Huskies, but that contest was canceled. The team began Grapefruit League games on February 28, losing to the Minnesota Twins. Announcers for spring training games broadcast on NESN were Dave O'Brien and Tom Caron for play-by-play with Jerry Remy, Dennis Eckersley and Lenny DiNardo for color commentary. Boston's spring training games continued through March 30; the team compiled a 16–11 record, scoring 159 runs while allowing 131.

== Regular season ==
Major League Baseball announced the 2021 regular season schedule on July 9, 2020. The Red Sox' schedule, as originally released, spanned April 1 to October 3. The All-Star Game was scheduled for July 13. For interleague play, the Red Sox were scheduled to face National League East teams.

=== Opening Day lineup ===
Originally scheduled for April 1, the team's first game of the season—at Fenway Park against the Baltimore Orioles—was postponed to April 2, due to rain.

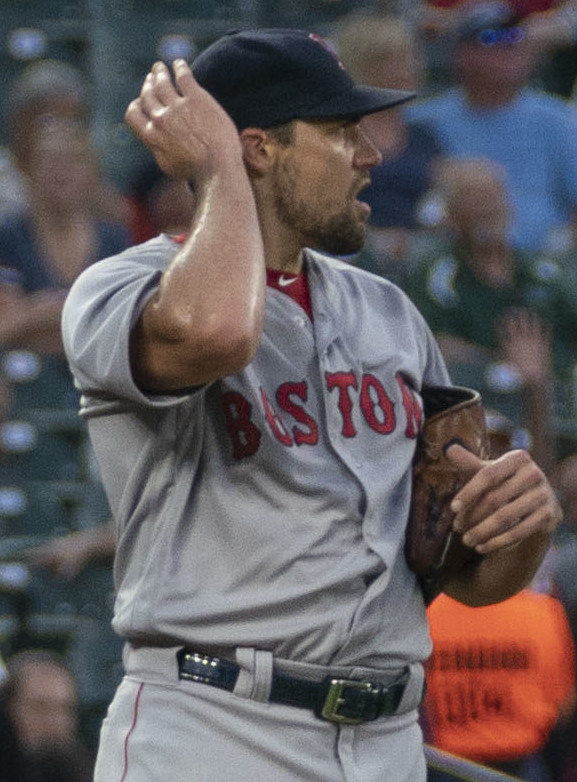
Opening Day starter Nathan Eovaldi

Order	No.	Player	Pos.
1	5	Kiké Hernández	2B
2	99	Alex Verdugo	CF
3	28	J. D. Martinez	DH
4	2	Xander Bogaerts	SS
5	11	Rafael Devers	3B
6	10	Hunter Renfroe	RF
7	12	Marwin González	LF
8	7	Christian Vázquez	C
9	29	Bobby Dalbec	1B
—	17	Nathan Eovaldi	P

April

=== April ===
April 1–April 4, vs. Baltimore Orioles

Rain caused Boston's first game to be postponed from April 1 to April 2. Nathan Eovaldi started the opener, as he had done the prior season, lasting 5 1/3 innings while allowing one run on four hits and striking out four batters. The Red Sox were limited to two hits and two walks, taking a 3–0 loss. Baltimore also took the second game of the series, 4–2. Red Sox starter Tanner Houck held the Orioles to two runs on six hits in five innings, while striking out eight. The Orioles completed the sweep with an 11–3 win in the third game of the series. Garrett Richards took the loss in his first start for Boston, allowing six runs on seven hits in two innings. J. D. Martinez hit the Red Sox' first home run of the season. The most recent time the Red Sox had started a season 0–3 at Fenway Park was 1948, opening that season with losses to the Philadelphia Athletics.

Red Sox lost the series 0–3 (5–18 runs)

April 5–April 7, vs. Tampa Bay Rays

The Red Sox' first win of the season came in the series opener against Tampa Bay, 11–2. Starter Nick Pivetta pitched five scoreless innings and got the win. J. D. Martinez hit his second home run of the season, while Xander Bogaerts had four hits and an RBI. The Red Sox tied the second game of the series at 3–3 in the bottom of the ninth inning via a Christian Vázquez home run, sending the game into extra innings. After a scoreless 10th inning, the teams traded runs in the 11th inning, making the score 4–4. After Tampa Bay took a 5–4 lead in the top of the 12th inning, Martinez hit a two-out double in the bottom of the 12th with runners at second and third, driving in both runs and giving Boston a 6–5 victory. Red Sox reliever Phillips Valdéz got the win. Boston completed the sweep with a 9–2 win in the third game of the series, as starter Nathan Eovaldi went seven innings while striking out seven and holding the Rays to three hits and one run. Vázquez hit his second home run of the season and Bogaerts went 3-for-3.

Red Sox won the series 3–0 (26–9 runs)

April 8–April 11, at Baltimore Orioles

The Red Sox' first road game of the year was a 7–3 win at Baltimore in the Orioles' home opener. Starter Eduardo Rodríguez, who had missed the 2020 season due to myocarditis, got the win. Rafael Devers and Kiké Hernández both homered. The second game of the series went into extra innings after the Red Sox tied the game, 4–4, in the top of the ninth. After Boston scored two runs in the top of the 10th, Matt Andriese held the Orioles scoreless in the bottom of the inning, securing his first save of the season and the Red Sox' fifth consecutive win. Devers again homered. Boston completed the sweep with a 14–9 win in the final game of the series, after building a 9–1 lead through five innings. Starter Nick Pivetta earned his second win of the season, while the offense had six home runs—three by J. D. Martinez, two by Devers, and one by Alex Verdugo.

Red Sox won the series 3–0 (27–16 runs)

April 12–April 15, at Minnesota Twins

The opener of a four-game series in Minneapolis was postponed shortly before its scheduled start time, for "the safety of all of those involved" following the killing of Daunte Wright the day before in nearby Brooklyn Center, Minnesota. The postponed game was rescheduled as part of a single-admission doubleheader on April 14, with both games seven-inning contests per 2021 MLB rules for doubleheaders. The Red Sox won the first game played in the series, 4–2, with reliever Adam Ottavino collecting the win and Matt Barnes earning his first save of the season. Hunter Renfroe and Rafael Devers both homered, as Boston extended their winning streak to seven games. For the doubleheader, Boston activated pitcher Eduard Bazardo as their extra player. The first game of the doubleheader was a 3–2 Red Sox victory, with starter Nathan Eovaldi getting the win; Barnes recorded the save. The Red Sox extended their winning streak to nine games via a 7–1 win in the second game of the doubleheader. Eduardo Rodríguez started and got the win; Bazardo pitched a scoreless inning of relief in his MLB debut. Alex Verdugo was 3-for-4 at the plate with a home run and three RBIs. The winning streak ended with a 4–3 loss to the Twins in the final game of the series, with the deciding run coming in the bottom of the ninth inning off of reliever Ottavino, who took the loss. The Red Sox were limited to four hits; Verdugo drove in all three Boston runs.

Red Sox won the series 3–1 (17–9 runs)

April 16–April 19, vs. Chicago White Sox

The opening game hosting the White Sox was postponed due to inclement weather, and was rescheduled to be played as part of a separate-admission doubleheader two days later. The Red Sox won the first game played, 7–4, breaking a 3–3 tie with a four-run eighth inning. Reliever Adam Ottavino got the win, Marwin González homered, and both Kiké Hernández and Xander Bogaerts went 4-for-5 at the plate. Chicago won the first game of the doubleheader, 3–2 in seven innings, as starter Tanner Houck took the loss. Hernández homered. The second game of the doubleheader was also won by the White Sox, 5–1 in seven innings, with the loss going to starter Martín Pérez. Boston won the final game of the series, 11–4, behind an early offensive outburst. Hernández, J. D. Martinez, and Alex Verdugo all hit home runs while White Sox starter Lucas Giolito was chased from the game in the second inning without recording an out. All Red Sox starters reached base, with Bobby Dalbec the only one that did not record a hit.

Red Sox split the series 2–2 (21–16 runs)

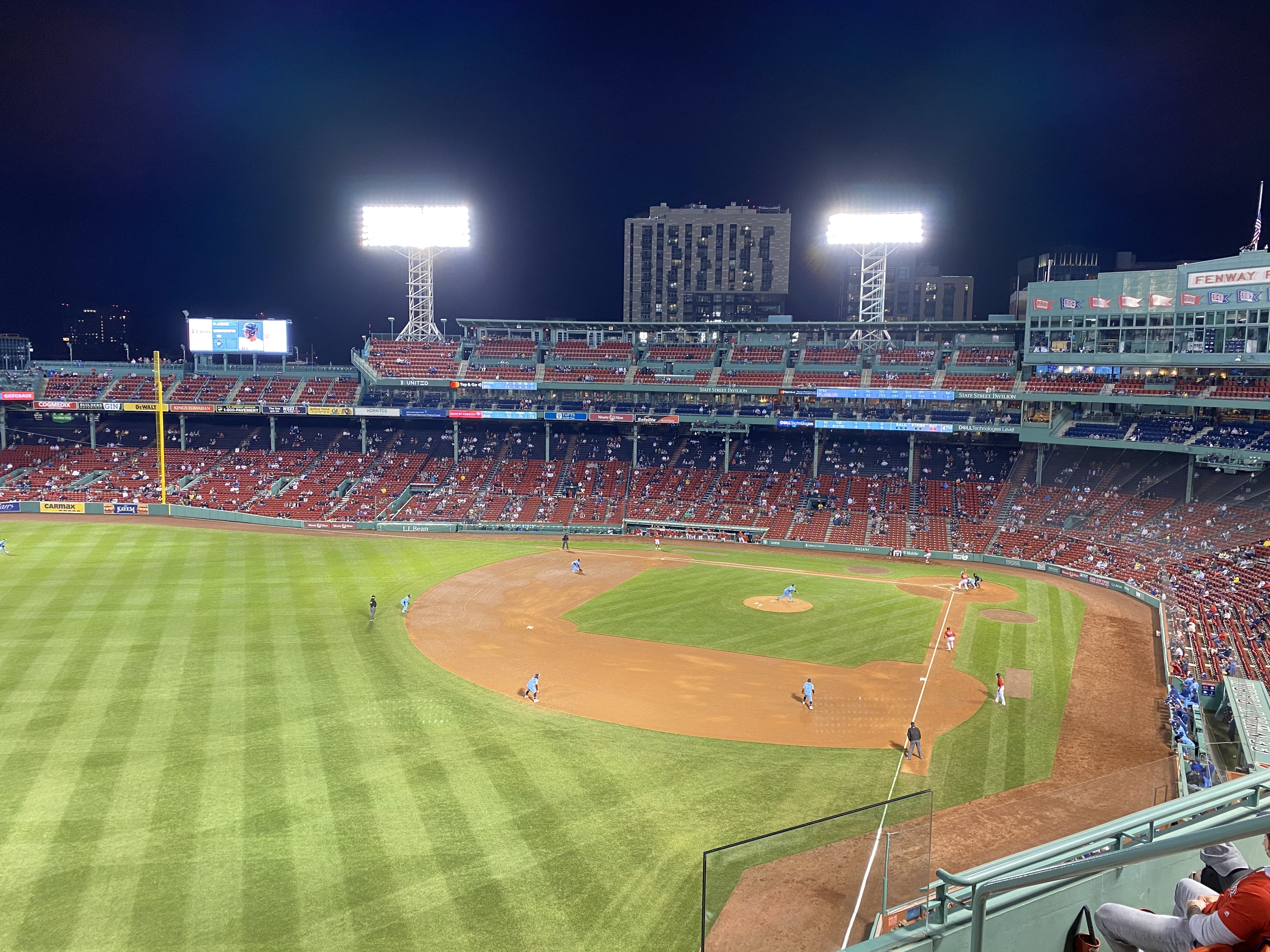
View of Fenway Park during the April 20 game against the Blue Jays

April 20–April 21, vs. Toronto Blue Jays

The Red Sox won the first game, 4–2, over the Blue Jays behind a home run from Xander Bogaerts and strong starting pitching from Eduardo Rodríguez, who earned the win. Matt Barnes earned a three-out save. Toronto won the second and final game of the series, 6–3, as Boston starter Garrett Richards took the loss. Bogaerts again homered.

Red Sox split the series 1–1 (7–8 runs)

April 22–April 25, vs. Seattle Mariners

In the first game of a four-game series, Red Sox starter Nick Pivetta allowed only a single hit in six innings of work, although the one hit—by Seattle DH Ty France—drove in two baserunners who had walked. The game was tied 2–2 after six innings, and 3–3 after nine innings. In the 10th inning, the Mariners scored four runs (three earned) off of two hits and two walks allowed by reliever Darwinzon Hernández, who took the loss after Boston was unable to score in the bottom of the inning. Rafael Devers homered. In game two, the Red Sox bounced back for a 6–5 win behind a three-hit effort from Alex Verdugo. J. D. Martinez and Xander Bogaerts both contributed home runs. Seattle mounted a rally in the ninth inning capped by a Kyle Seager three-run homer, but Matt Barnes was able to hold the lead. Reliever Hirokazu Sawamura got his first MLB win. Seattle took the third game of the series, 8–2, handing Boston starter Nathan Eovaldi the loss after scoring five runs (four earned) on seven hits in the first five innings. The Red Sox won the final game of the series, 5–3, with four of the runs coming in the first inning off of Mariners starter Nick Margevicius, who lasted only 1/3 of an inning. Eduardo Rodríguez and Matt Barnes earned their fourth win and fourth save of the season, respectively.

Red Sox split the series 2–2 (16–23 runs)

April 27–April 28, at New York Mets

Boston took the first game of a two-game series, 2–1, behind the starting pitching of Garrett Richards. Richards posted 10 strikeouts while walking none in a strong seven-inning effort. The Red Sox scored on Bobby Dalbec's first home run of the season and a Rafael Devers RBI single. Boston won the second game, 1–0, with Christian Vázquez driving in the only run, in the second inning. Red Sox starter Nick Pivetta allowed only one hit in five innings of work, earning the win. Matt Barnes notched his sixth save of the season.

Red Sox won the series 2–0 (3–1 runs)

April 29–April 30, at Texas Rangers

Texas won the opener of a four-game series, 4–1. Boston was held to three total hits, with their only run driven in by Rafael Devers; starter Martín Pérez took the loss. Boston won the second game of the series, 6–1, led by two home runs by J. D. Martinez and one each by Xander Bogaerts and Devers. Starter Nathan Eovaldi held the Rangers to one run on four hits in six innings to earn the win. The Red Sox ended April with a record of 17–10, good for first place in the American League East, 3 1/2 games ahead of the second-place Toronto Blue Jays.

May

=== May ===
The Red Sox entered May atop the American League East with a record of 17–10, having just split the first two games of a four-game series against the Rangers.

May 1–May 2, at Texas Rangers (cont'd)

Texas won the third game of the series, 8–6, outscoring Boston by a 4–1 margin after the fifth inning. Starter Eduardo Rodríguez had a no decision with reliever Matt Andriese taking the loss after allowing three runs on three hits in the sixth inning. Hunter Renfroe homered. The Rangers also won the final game of the series, 5–3, scoring three runs (two earned) in the bottom of the eighth inning off of Red Sox reliever Adam Ottavino, who took the loss. Xander Bogaerts was 3-for-4 at the plate including a home run.

Red Sox lost the series 1–3 (16–18 runs)

May 4–May 6, vs. Detroit Tigers

In the opening game of a three-game series, Boston built an 8–2 lead after three innings, and went on to win, 11–7, in a game with 24 total hits and four errors. Starter Nick Pivetta got the win, and closer Matt Barnes earned the save. Alex Verdugo, Xander Bogaerts, Hunter Renfroe, and Kiké Hernández each homered. Boston lost the second game of the series in extra innings, 6–5. Trailing by a 3–1 score, the Red Sox tied the game, 3–3, in the seventh inning. With that same score in the top of the 10th inning, the Tigers scored three runs (two earned) off of reliever Garrett Whitlock, who took the loss. Boston's rally in the bottom of the 10th inning came up a run short. J. D. Martinez hit his 10th home run of the season. The final game of the series, which featured 30 total hits and six errors, was won by Boston, 12–9. After taking an early 4–1 lead, the Red Sox were at a 9–8 deficit entering the bottom of the eighth inning, before pushing across their final four runs. Reliever Matt Andriese got the win, and Adam Ottavino notched his first save for Boston.

Red Sox won the series 2–1 (28–22 runs)

May 7–May 10, at Baltimore Orioles

After rain delayed the start of the first game of the series by 98 minutes, Boston won, 6–2, with starter Eduardo Rodríguez improving to 5–0 for the season. Bobby Dalbec homered. The Red Sox won the second game of the series, 11–6, with starter Garrett Richards getting the win. Michael Chavis (called up after Kiké Hernández went on the injured list) and Xander Bogaerts each homered. Starter Nick Pivetta went to 5–0 on the season via Boston's 4–3 win in the third game of the series. Matt Barnes earned the save; Rafael Devers and Hunter Renfroe homered. Baltimore avoided the sweep by winning the final game, 4–1. Devers drove in the only Boston run, via a sacrifice fly. Reliever Matt Andriese took the loss, allowing three runs on four hits in two innings.

Red Sox won the series 3–1 (22–15 runs)

May 11–May 13, vs. Oakland Athletics

Oakland won the opening game of a three-game series, 3–2. Boston starter Nathan Eovaldi held the A's to one run on two hits in six innings, with the loss going to reliever Darwinzon Hernández who allowed two runs on two hits and a walk in only 1/3 of an inning. Rafael Devers hit his ninth home run of the season. The second game of the series was also an Oakland win, 4–1. Boston's only run came on a bases-loaded walk in the first inning; the team was held to five hits and left a total of eight men on base. Starter Eduardo Rodríguez took the loss. The Red Sox avoided being swept with an 8–1 win in the final game of the series. Starter Garrett Richards earned the win, with reliever Garrett Whitlock earning a three-inning save. Xander Bogaerts and Bobby Dalbec homered.

Red Sox lost the series 1–2 (11–8 runs)

May 14–May 16, vs. Los Angeles Angels

The Red Sox won the series opener against the Angels, 4–3. Starter Nick Pivetta held Los Angeles to two runs on four hits in six innings, but received a no decision as the win went to reliever Matt Andriese. Closer Matt Barnes earned his ninth save of the season. Hunter Renfroe and Bobby Dalbec homered. In the second game of the series, Boston built a 4–0 lead through four innings, en route to a 9–0 win. Starter Martín Pérez earned his first win of the season. Alex Verdugo, Xander Bogaerts, and Rafael Devers each homered. The Angels won the final game of the series, 6–5, taking a late lead with two runs in the top of the ninth inning off of Barnes, who took the loss. Boston backup catcher Kevin Plawecki hit his first home run of the season.

Red Sox won the series 2–1 (18–9 runs)

May 18–May 20, at Toronto Blue Jays (in Florida)

Due to travel restrictions related to the COVID-19 pandemic, the Blue Jays began the 2021 season playing home games at their spring training facility—TD Ballpark in Dunedin, Florida. The Blue Jays won the opening game of the series, 8–0, scoring five runs in five innings off of Boston starter Eduardo Rodríguez, who took the loss. The second game was won by the Red Sox, 7–3. Starter Garrett Richards held the Blue Jays to two runs on seven hits in 6 2/3 innings and earned the win. Alex Verdugo, J. D. Martinez, Kiké Hernández, and Christian Vázquez each homered. The Red Sox won the final game of the series, 8–7, with three runs in the top of the ninth inning to turn a two-run deficit into a one-run lead. Martinez and Bobby Dalbec homered, while Matt Barnes recorded his 10th save of the season.

Red Sox won the series 2–1 (15–18 runs)

May 21–May 23, at Philadelphia Phillies

The Red Sox won the first game of a three-game road series in Philadelphia, 11–3, with starter Martín Pérez getting the win. In his debut game with Boston, utility player Danny Santana homered, while Rafael Devers hit his 12th of the season. The second game was also won by Boston, 4–3, with starter Nathan Eovaldi earning his fifth win of the season and closer Matt Barnes notching his 11th save. Santana again homered, as did Xander Bogaerts. The Phillies won the final game of the series, 6–2, giving Red Sox starter Eduardo Rodríguez his third loss of the season. Devers and Franchy Cordero each homered.

Red Sox won the series 2–1 (17–12 runs)

May 25–May 26, vs. Atlanta Braves

Entering a two-game home series with Atlanta, the Red Sox (29–19) were no longer atop the AL East for the first time since early in the season, one-half game behind Tampa Bay (30–19). The Braves won the first game, 3–1, with Boston starter Garrett Richards taking the loss. The Red Sox' only run came in the bottom of the first inning, when Rafael Devers was hit by a pitch with the bases loaded. The second game, including a two-hour and 53-minute rain delay, was won by Boston, 9–5. Starter Nick Pivetta improved his season record to 6–0. Devers and Hunter Renfroe both homered.

Red Sox split the series 1–1 (10–8 runs)

May 28–May 30, vs. Miami Marlins

The Red Sox opened a three-game home series against the Marlins with a 5–2 win, in a game ended by rain in the sixth inning. The winning runs were driven in by Alex Verdugo via a three-run homer in the fifth inning. Starter Martín Pérez earned the win. Boston also won the second game of the series, 3–1, which was delayed by rain for 16 minutes but lasted its scheduled nine innings. Attendance at Fenway Park was 25,089 in the first game played following the State of Massachusetts lifting COVID-19 restrictions on sports events. Starter Nathan Eovaldi improved to 6–2 on the season with closer Matt Barnes allowing one run before securing his 12th save. Rafael Devers and Hunter Renfroe each went 3-for-4 at the plate. The final game of the series was postponed due to rain, with an announced makeup date of June 7.

Red Sox won the series 2–0 (8–3 runs)

May 31, at Houston Astros

This series marked the first time that Alex Cora visited Houston since the Houston Astros sign stealing scandal became public, which led to Cora being suspended for the 2020 season, due to his role in the scandal while he was Houston's bench coach in 2017. In the first game of a four-game series, the Astros jumped out to an early 4–0 lead after three innings, en route to an 11–2 win. Starter Eduardo Rodríguez took the loss. Hunter Renfroe was the only Boston player with more than one hit, one of them a home run. The Red Sox ended May with a record of 32–21, two games behind the Tampa Bay Rays in the American League East.

June

=== June ===
The Red Sox entered June in second place in the American League East with a record of 32–21, having just lost the first game of a four-game series against the Astros.

June 1–June 3, at Houston Astros (cont'd)

Houston won the second game of the series, 5–1, handing Boston starter Garrett Richards his fourth loss of the season. Alex Verdugo had two of the Red Sox' five hits. Houston also won the third game of the series, 2–1, as Boston starter Nick Pivetta suffered his first loss of the season. Hunter Renfroe drove in the only Red Sox run. Boston avoided being swept with a 5–1 win in the final game of the series; starter Martín Pérez earned the win. Christian Arroyo hit a three-run home run.

Red Sox lost the series 1–3 (9–19 runs)

June 4–June 6, at New York Yankees

In the first series of the season against the Yankees, the Red Sox jumped out to an early lead via a Rafael Devers three-run home run in the top of the first inning. Nathan Eovaldi held New York to two runs (one earned) on eight hits in six innings to earn the win; Matt Barnes closed out the 5–2 win with his 13th save of the season. Boston came back from a 2–0 deficit to win the second game of the series, 7–3. Bobby Dalbec had a two-run home, and Devers also drove in two runs. Garrett Whitlock earned the win in relief, while Barnes was brought in to record the final out after the Yankees put two baserunners on in the ninth. The Red Sox completed the sweep with a 6–5 win in the third game of the series. Down 3–1 after six innings, Boston scored twice in the seventh and once in the eighth and held a 4–3 lead in the bottom of the ninth. However, Barnes was unable to convert the save as the Yankees tied the game and forced extra innings. Xander Bogaerts drove in two runs in the top of the tenth, and Phillips Valdéz held the Yankees to one run in the bottom of the inning to secure his first major league save. Alex Verdugo and Marwin González each homered. This was the first time that the Red Sox swept the Yankees in a three-game series at Yankee Stadium since June 7–9, 2011.

Red Sox won the series 3–0 (18–10 runs)

June 7, vs. Miami Marlins

In the makeup of a May 30 rainout, Boston won their fifth game in a row, defeating the Marlins, 5–3. Starter Nick Pivetta held the Marlins to two runs on seven hits, but left after 4 2/3 innings—the win was awarded to reliever Hirokazu Sawamura, the fourth of six Boston pitchers in the game. Adam Ottavino recorded the final four outs for the save.

Red Sox won the series 1–0 (5–3 runs)

June 8–June 10, vs. Houston Astros

In the opener of a three-game series, Houston jumped out to an early 6–0 lead and went on to win, 7–1. Starter Martín Pérez only lasted two innings and took the loss. Hunter Renfroe drove in Boston's only run. The Astros also won the second game of the series, 8–3. Starter Nathan Eovaldi took the loss after allowing five runs on 11 hits in 5 2/3 innings. Xander Bogaerts drove in two of Boston's runs via a fourth-inning homer. The third game of the series featured 24 hits, 20 runs, and the ejection of Houston manager Dusty Baker, as the Red Sox avoided being swept via a 12–8 win. J. D. Martinez and Christian Arroyo both homered, and Christian Vázquez went 3-for-4 with three RBIs. Darwinzon Hernández, the third of six Boston pitchers, got the win.

Red Sox lost the series 1–2 (16–23 runs)

June 11–June 14, vs. Toronto Blue Jays

Boston was outhit by Toronto, 16–8, in the opener of a four-game series, but came away with a 6–5 win. The Blue Jays held a lead from the top of the first inning until the bottom of the eighth, when the Red Sox tied the score at 5–5. A Toronto error in the bottom of the ninth put a runner on second base, and Alex Verdugo, who went 3-for-4, then drove in the winning run with a single off of the Green Monster. Bobby Dalbec and Christian Arroyo each homered; reliever Garrett Whitlock got the win. Toronto jumped out to an early 2–0 lead in the second game of the series and went on to win, 7–2. Starter Nick Pivetta took the loss. The third game of the series was an 18–4 win by the Blue Jays, who had eight home runs and 20 hits. The eight home runs set a new single-game record for a visiting team at Fenway Park. Starter Martín Pérez fell to 4–4 on the season after allowing five runs in 1 1/3 innings. He was followed by Ryan Weber, who allowed 11 runs in 5 2/3 innings. Position players Arroyo and Marwin González each pitched an inning. Offensively, Dalbec and Xander Bogaerts each homered. Boston won the final game of the series, 2–1. After the Red Sox held a 1–0 lead from the third inning, Boston closer Matt Barnes allowed a game-tying home run to Vladimir Guerrero Jr. in the top of the ninth inning. In the bottom of the ninth, Rafael Devers drove in the winning run via a one-out double with two men on base. Starter Nathan Eovaldi held the Blue Jays to three hits and no runs in 6 2/3 innings but received a no decision.

Red Sox split the series 2–2 (14–31 runs)

June 15–June 16, at Atlanta Braves

Boston won the opening game of a two-game series, 10–8, after building an early 5–0 lead. Rafael Devers, Hunter Renfroe, Xander Bogaerts, and Alex Verdugo each homered. Starter Eduardo Rodríguez left after four innings, having allowed four runs on six hits; reliever Hirokazu Sawamura, the fourth of six Boston pitchers, got the win. Matt Barnes recorded his 15th save of the season. The second game of the series was also a Red Sox win by the same score, 10–8. Christian Arroyo hit Boston's first grand slam of the season, coming the seventh inning and turning a 6–7 deficit into a 10–7 lead. Reliever Yacksel Ríos made his Red Sox debut and earned the win; he was the third of seven Boston pitchers in the game. Starter Garrett Richards allowed six runs on seven hits in four innings; Adam Ottavino earned the save.

Red Sox won the series 2–0 (20–16 runs)

June 18–June 20, at Kansas City Royals

Kansas City won the first game of a three-game series, 5–3, dropping Boston starter Nick Pivetta to 6–3 on the season. Rafael Devers hit his 17th home run of the season. Christian Arroyo became the first Red Sox player to be ejected during the 2021 season, via a ninth-inning strike-zone disagreement with home plate umpire Jim Wolf. The Red Sox were 7–1 winners in the second game of the series, with starter Martín Pérez getting the win. Bobby Dalbec was 3-for-3 including a home run; J. D. Martinez also homered. The win put Boston into a tie with Tampa Bay atop the AL East at 43–28; the Rays later lost to the Mariners, giving the Red Sox sole possession of the divisional lead for the first time since May 22. The third game of the series was won by the Royals, 7–3. Starter Nathan Eovaldi allowed seven hits and four runs in four innings and took the loss. Catcher Kevin Plawecki and second baseman Arroyo both left the game with injuries. Devers and Kiké Hernández each homered.

Red Sox lost the series 1–2 (13–13 runs)

June 22–June 24, at Tampa Bay Rays

Boston won the opener of a three-game series, 9–5 in 11 innings. Boston starter Eduardo Rodríguez received a no decision after allowing five runs (three earned) on seven hits in six innings. After the game remained tied, 5–5, for the 6th through 10th innings, Boston scored four unanswered runs in the top of the 11th inning. (Note: Rafael Devers was originally credited with two RBIs during the 11th inning of the June 22 game; a later scoring change ruled that he reached base via an error, thus removing those two RBIs.) Xander Bogaerts was 3-for-5, while Hunter Renfroe had a home run and three RBIs. Reliever Darwinzon Hernández recorded the final four outs and got the win. Tampa Bay won the second game of the series, 8–2, as Boston starter Garrett Richards only lasted 1 2/3 innings while allowing five runs (four earned) on three hits and four walks. Both teams had six hits, with the Red Sox drawing six walks and the Rays drawing nine. The Rays won the final game of the series, 1–0. Red Sox starter Nick Pivetta left the game after 6 2/3 innings having thrown 100 pitches and not allowing a hit. The Rays collected their first hit with one out in the eighth inning, off of reliever Darwinzon Hernández. With two outs in the ninth inning, Rays designated hitter Manuel Margot singled, stole second and advanced to third on a throwing error by catcher Christian Vázquez. Margot then scored the only run of the game via a wild pitch from closer Matt Barnes, who took the loss. The win put Tampa Bay back into first place atop the AL East at 45–31, one-half game ahead of Boston at 44–31.

Red Sox lost the series 1–2 (11–14 runs)

June 25–June 27, vs. New York Yankees

The Red Sox honored Dustin Pedroia, who retired in February, in a ceremony prior to the first game of the series. Boston won the series opener, 5–3. After reaching a 3–3 tie in the middle of the second inning, Boston scored the game's only other runs; one each in the third and eighth innings. Starter Martín Pérez received a no decision after allowing three runs on six hits in 3 2/3 innings. The win went to Garrett Whitlock, the third of five Boston pitchers; closer Matt Barnes got the save. Xander Bogaerts and Hunter Renfroe each had two RBIs. Boston also won the second game of the series, 4–2. Starter Nathan Eovaldi held the Yankees to a single run on seven hits in 7 2/3 innings and earned the win; Adam Ottavino earned his fifth save of the season in recording the final four outs. Bogaerts and Renfroe each had three hits and an RBI. Catcher Connor Wong collected his first MLB hit. The Red Sox completed the series sweep with a 9–2 win in the third game. Starter Eduardo Rodríguez earned the win, holding the Yankees to two runs on five hits in six innings. Boston had four home runs, one each by Kiké Hernández, Rafael Devers, J. D. Martinez, and Christian Vázquez. The win put Boston back atop the AL East at 47–31, a one-half game ahead of Tampa Bay at 47–32.

Red Sox won the series 3–0 (18–7 runs)

June 28–June 30, vs. Kansas City Royals

The Red Sox opened a four-game series against the Royals with a 6–5 win, recovering from a 5–2 deficit after the first two innings. Hunter Renfroe hit two home runs, while Kiké Hernández and Bobby Dalbec each hit one. Starter Garrett Richards received a no decision after allowing five runs on 11 hits in 5 2/3 innings. The win went to reliever Hirokazu Sawamura, the second of four Boston pitchers in the game. Closer Matt Barnes recorded his 17th save of the season. Boston won the second game of the series, 7–6, extending their winning streak to five games. J. D. Martinez was 2-for-2 with two walks and four RBIs. Starter Nick Pivetta left after 4 1/3 innings; reliever Yacksel Ríos recorded the next five outs and earned the win, while Barnes earned another save. The Red Sox extended their winning streak to six games, via a 6–2 win in the third game of the series. Rain delayed the start of the game, and halted play, for a total of two hours and 21 minutes. Starter Martín Pérez earned the win. Martinez and Renfroe each homered. The Red Sox ended June with a record of 50–31, leading the American League East by three games over the Tampa Bay Rays.

July

=== July ===
The Red Sox entered July atop the American League East with a record of 50–31, having just won the first three games of a four-game series against the Royals.

July 1, vs. Kansas City Royals (cont'd)

The Red Sox' winning streak reached seven games as the team completed a four-game sweep of the Royals with a 15–1 win. Starter Nathan Eovaldi held Kansas City scoreless through seven innings, followed by reliever Matt Andriese who pitched the final two innings and allowed only an unearned run. Each Boston starter had at least one hit. Kiké Hernández, J. D. Martinez, Danny Santana, and Rafael Devers each homered.

Red Sox won the series 4–0 (34–14 runs)

July 2–July 4, at Oakland Athletics

The opener of a three-game road series in Oakland was a 3–2 extra innings win for Boston, extending the winning streak to eight games. Kiké Hernández drove in the winning run in the top of the 10th, with Adam Ottavino holding the Athletics scoreless in the bottom of the inning for the save. Closer Matt Barnes, who blew a save in the bottom of the ninth, was credited with the win. Starter Eduardo Rodríguez allowed no runs and only a single hit in six innings, but had to settle for a no decision. The second game of the series also went to extra innings, tied 4–4. After Boston starter Garrett Richards held Oakland to two runs on five hits in five innings, the Athletics tied the game in the eighth inning via two runs off of reliever Yacksel Ríos. J. D. Martinez, playing left field, threw out Athletics catcher Sean Murphy at the plate in the bottom of the 10th inning, preserving the tie. After a scoreless 11th inning, the Red Sox scored twice in the top of the 12th to take a 6–4 lead. However, Oakland scored three runs off of Matt Andriese in the bottom of the inning for a 7–6 win. Hernández hit his 10th home run of the season. The final game of the series was a 1–0 Boston win, with the only run of the game coming on a double–single–ground-out sequence in the sixth inning. Alex Verdugo scored the run, and was the only player in the game with more than one hit. Starter Nick Pivetta allowed just two hits in seven innings for the win, while Barnes earned his 19th save of the season.

Red Sox won the series 2–1 (10–9 runs)

July 5–July 7, at Los Angeles Angels

The first game of a three-game series with the Angels was won by the Red Sox, 5–4. Starter Martín Pérez got the win, having held Los Angeles to one run on eight hits in 5 1/3 innings. Adam Ottavino notched his seventh save of the season. Rafael Devers had three hits, include a home run; Christian Arroyo also homered. The Angels won the second game of the series, 5–3, with all their runs scored off of starter Nathan Eovaldi, who lasted 5 2/3 innings and took the loss. Hunter Renfroe homered. The final game of the series was a 5–4 Angels win, dropping starter Eduardo Rodríguez to a 6–5 record for the season. Xander Bogaerts went 3-for-4 at the plate.

Red Sox lost the series 1–2 (12–14 runs)

July 9–July 11, vs. Philadelphia Phillies

Boston won the opener of a three-game home series against the Phillies, 11–5. Starter Garrett Richards got the win, improving to 5–5 on the season. Six different Red Sox batters had two hits apiece, while J. D. Martinez, Kiké Hernández, and Rafael Devers each homered. The Phillies won the second game of the series, 11–2. Holding a 3–2 lead after seven innings, Philadelphia scored eight runs in the top of the eighth inning to put the game out of reach. Starter Martín Pérez allowed three runs on six hits, exiting after 3 2/3 innings and taking the loss. Xander Bogaerts hit his 14th home run of the season. The final game of the series was another Phillies win, 5–4. Starter Nick Pivetta took the loss against his former team, allowing five runs on four hits in four innings. Bogaerts homered again. The Red Sox reached the All-Star break atop the American League East with a record of 55–36, 1 1/2 games ahead of Tampa Bay.

Red Sox lost the series 1–2 (17–21 runs)

July 13, All-Star Game at Coors Field

The Red Sox had five players selected to the All-Star Game; all five played as the American League defeated the National League, 5–2. Xander Bogaerts and Rafael Devers started the game at shortstop and third base, respectively. Bogaerts went 2-for-3 at the plate with an RBI, while Devers went 1-for-2. They were replaced by reserve players in the bottom of the fifth inning. Nathan Eovaldi pitched the fourth inning, allowing no runs on one hit. J. D. Martinez entered the game as designated hitter in the top of the fifth inning and went 0-for-2. Matt Barnes pitched the eighth inning, allowing no runs on two hits and a walk.

July 15–July 18, at New York Yankees

The opener of a four-game series at Yankee Stadium was postponed due to three positive COVID-19 test results within the Yankees' pitching staff. The next day, Boston won the first game played in the series, 4–0. Starter Eduardo Rodríguez allowed only two hits in 5 2/3 innings and earned the win. Tanner Houck pitched the final three innings, earning a save. Christian Arroyo and J. D. Martinez each homered. The Yankees won the second game of the series, 3–1, in a six-inning rain-shortened contest. Starter Nathan Eovaldi held the Yankees to one run on two hits in five innings, leaving with a no decision. Reliever Hirokazu Sawamura allowed two home runs in the bottom of the sixth, and took the loss. The game included the MLB debut of Jarren Duran, the ejections of bench coach Will Venable and backup catcher Kevin Plawecki following a check-swing third-strike call that the Red Sox dugout took exception to, and a brief stoppage in play after left fielder Alex Verdugo was struck in the back by a baseball thrown by a fan. The final game of the series was a 9–1 New York win, as starter Martín Pérez allowed three runs on five hits in four innings, taking the loss. Xander Bogaerts was the only Red Sox batter with two hits, while Hunter Renfroe had the only RBI.

Red Sox lost the series 1–2 (6–12 runs)

July 19–July 21, at Toronto Blue Jays (in Buffalo)

Boston won the first game of a three-game series played in Buffalo, New York, 13–4. J. D. Martinez was 4-for-4 with a walk, while Kiké Hernández hit two home runs. Boston also had home runs from Jarren Duran, Hunter Renfroe (a grand slam), Rafael Devers, and Danny Santana. Starter Nick Pivetta allowed four runs on 11 hits in 6 2/3 innings and earned the win. The second game of the series was rained out, with a makeup game scheduled for August 7. Boston won the final game of the series, 7–4. Starter Garrett Richards earned the win, allowing four runs on four hits in 5 2/3 innings, and Matt Barnes earned his 20th save of the season. Hernández, Devers, Martinez, Renfroe, and Michael Chavis each homered.

Red Sox won the series 2–0 (20–8 runs)

July 22–July 25, vs. New York Yankees

The first game of a four-game home series against the Yankees was a 5–4 extra-innings win. Starter Tanner Houck left after 4 2/3 innings due to a 55-minute rain delay, having held New York to one unearned run on two hits. Trailing 3–1 entering the bottom of the ninth, Kiké Hernández drove in two runs via a two-out double to tie the game. The Yankees scored one run off of Matt Barnes in the top of the 10th. In the bottom of the inning, Boston scored twice, taking advantage of four wild pitches by Yankees reliever Brooks Kriske; Hunter Renfroe drove in the winning run via a sacrifice fly. The second game of the series was a 6–2 Boston win. Trailing 1–0 entering the bottom of the fifth, the Red Sox scored three runs, then added three more in the bottom of the seventh. Rafael Devers had five RBIs via two home runs. Starter Eduardo Rodríguez left in the second inning due to migraine symptoms. Yacksel Ríos, the third of five Boston relievers who followed Rodríguez, allowed no runs or hits in two innings of work and got the win. In the second game of the series, Boston took an early 3–0 lead, but the Yankees scored four unanswered runs in the eighth inning to give the Red Sox a 4–3 defeat. Starter Nathan Eovaldi lasted 7 2/3 innings and allowed two runs on seven hits; reliever Adam Ottavino allowed two runs on three hits in 1/3 of an inning and took the loss. Kevin Plawecki was the only Boston batter with two hits. The final game of the series was a 5–4 Red Sox win. Entering the bottom of the eighth inning, Boston had not recorded a hit and trailed, 4–0. Five consecutive hits and a sacrifice fly put the Red Sox ahead by a run. Barnes then closed out the game for his 21st save of the season. The win went to Brandon Workman, the third of four relievers who followed starter Martín Pérez.

Red Sox won the series 3–1 (19–14 runs)

July 26–July 29, vs. Toronto Blue Jays

The Red Sox won the first game of a four-game home series against Toronto, 5–4. Boston's 3–2 fifth-inning lead became a 4–3 deficit via a two-run Bo Bichette homer. Alex Verdugo's own two-run homer in the eighth inning put Boston back in the lead, allowing Matt Barnes to close out the game with his 22nd save of the year. Starter Nick Pivetta had a no decision after allowing four runs on six hits in 4 2/3 innings; reliever Adam Ottavino got the win. Rafael Devers also homered. The second game of the series was postponed due to rain, resulting in a doubleheader being scheduled for the following day. The first game of the doubleheader was won by the Blue Jays, 4–1, in seven innings. Starter Garrett Richards allowed four runs on eight hits in four innings and took the loss. J. D. Martinez drove in Boston's only run. The second game of the doubleheader was a Boston win, also by a 4–1 score in seven innings. Starter Tanner Houck allowed one run in four innings; the win went to reliever Garrett Whitlock, who pitched two scoreless innings, while Barnes registered another save. Kevin Plawecki had three hits, and Jarren Duran had two RBIs. The final game of the series was a 13–1 Blue Jays win, with starter Eduardo Rodríguez taking the loss after allowing six runs in 3 1/3 innings. Bobby Dalbec drove in Boston's only run. Red Sox backup catcher Plawecki pitched a scoreless ninth inning.

Red Sox split the series 2–2 (11–22 runs)

July 30–July 31, at Tampa Bay Rays

Tampa Bay won the opener of a three-game series, 7–3, dropping starter Martín Pérez to a 7–7 record for the season. The second game of the series was also won by the Rays, 9–5. Starter Nathan Eovaldi allowed six runs (five earned) on six hits in 5 1/3 innings and took the loss. Xander Bogaerts and Bobby Dalbec each homered. The Rays ended July back in the lead of the American League East with a 63–42 record, one-half game ahead of the Red Sox at 63–43.

August

=== August ===
The Red Sox entered August in second place in the American League East with a record of 63–43, having just lost the first two games of a three-game series against the division-leading Rays (63–42).

August 1, vs. Tampa Bay Rays (cont'd)

The Rays completed a three-game sweep with a 3–2 win. Red Sox started Nick Pivetta took the loss; he allowed three runs on three hits in 4 2/3 innings. Kiké Hernández had three hits and Hunter Renfroe homered. Boston had runners at first and third with two outs in the ninth, but were unable to push across the tying run.

Red Sox lost the series 0–3 (10–19 runs)

August 3–August 5, at Detroit Tigers

Detroit defeated Boston, 4–2, in the opener of a three-game series, extending the Red Sox' losing streak to five games. Starter Garrett Richards allowed three runs on five hits in four innings and took the loss. Hunter Renfroe homered. Boston won the middle game of the series, 4–1, as Eduardo Rodríguez improved to 8–6 on the season, allowing no runs on two hits in five innings. J. D. Martinez, Kiké Hernández, and Jarren Duran each homered, while Matt Barnes notched his 24th save of the season. The Tigers won the final game, 8–1. Red Sox starter Martín Pérez left after 1 1/3 innings, having allowed three runs on five hits, and took the loss. Alex Verdugo drove in Boston's only run.

Red Sox lost the series 1–2 (7–13 runs)

August 6–August 8, at Toronto Blue Jays

Toronto won the first game of a four-game series, 12–4, powered by a nine-run fifth inning. Starter Nathan Eovaldi allowed seven of those runs, and took the loss. Infielder Jonathan Araúz pitched the bottom of the eighth inning for Boston. Hunter Renfroe homered. Toronto won the second game of the series (also the first game of a doubleheader), 1–0. Each team only had two hits. The game's only score was a walk-off home run hit by Marcus Semien off of Matt Barnes to start the bottom of the seventh inning. The Red Sox won the second game of the doubleheader, scheduled for seven innings, 2–1 in eight innings. With Toronto holding a 1–0 lead entering the sixth, Alex Verdugo homered to tie the contest. With no further scoring through the seventh, Boston scored one run in the eighth, driven in by Araúz. Adam Ottavino then held the Blue Jays scoreless to earn his eighth save of the season. The win went to Barnes, who had pitched the seventh inning; starter Tanner Houck went 3 2/3 innings and had a no decision. Toronto won the final game of the series, 9–8, overcoming a 7–2 Boston lead after four innings. Red Sox starter Garrett Richards allowed four runs (three earned) on six hits in five innings, while Barnes took the loss after allowing a three-run homer to George Springer in the eighth inning. J. D. Martinez was 4-for-5 with three RBIs and Kevin Plawecki was 3-for-4 also with three RBIs.

Red Sox lost the series 1–3 (14–23 runs)

August 10–August 12, vs. Tampa Bay Rays

Boston had a 4–1 lead in the first game of a three-game home series, but Tampa Bay rallied for an 8–4 win. It was the 10th Red Sox loss in 12 games. Starter Eduardo Rodríguez went 5 1/3 innings while allowing two runs on four hits; Matt Barnes took the loss in relief after allowing four runs on two hits in 2/3 of an inning. Rafael Devers and Hunter Renfroe homered. Boston recovered in the second game of the series with a 20–8 win, the most Red Sox runs scored in a single game since the 2015 season. Bobby Dalbec had 5 RBIs on the night, and Renfroe and Xander Bogaerts each added 4 RBIs of their own. Boston's 19 hits included only one home run, by Bogaerts. Starter Nathan Eovaldi tossed seven innings of three-hit ball, surrendering one run, and earned his 10th win of the season. The Rays’ Josh Fleming was charged with 10 earned runs in 3 1/3 innings pitched. Tampa Bay won the final game of the series, 8–1. Red Sox starter Tanner Houck allowed four runs (three earned) on six hits in five innings, and took the loss. Devers drove in Boston's only run.

Red Sox lost the series 1–2 (25–24 runs)

August 13–August 15, vs. Baltimore Orioles

Boston won the opener of a three-game home series against the Orioles, 8–1. Starter Nick Pivetta went six innings and got the win, improving to 9–5 on the season, while Garrett Richards pitched the final three innings to earn a save. Bobby Dalbec was 3-for-4 with a home run and three RBIs. Xander Bogaerts and Hunter Renfroe also homered. Kyle Schwarber made his Red Sox debut, going 0-for-2 with two walks and two runs scored as the DH. The second game of the series marked the return of Chris Sale to the Red Sox, following his Tommy John surgery and subsequent rehabilitation. Sale went five innings while allowing two runs on six hits and earned the win as Boston defeated Baltimore, 16–2. Alex Verdugo went 4-for-5 with an RBI and three runs scored. The Red Sox had two home runs from Dalbec, and one each from Renfroe, Rafael Devers, and J. D. Martinez. Boston completed the sweep with a 6–2 win in the third game of the series. Starter Eduardo Rodríguez earned his ninth win of the season, holding the Orioles to one unearned run on three hits in six innings. Martinez again homered, and had three RBIs.

Red Sox won the series 3–0 (30–5 runs)

August 17–August 18, at New York Yankees

Boston opened a three-game road series in New York with a loss in the first game of a doubleheader, 5–3. Starter Tanner Houck had a no decision after holding the Yankees to two runs on five hits in four innings. Reliever Garrett Whitlock allowed two runs in 1/3 of an inning and took the loss. Christian Vázquez had a solo home run, while Xander Bogaerts had the other two RBIs for Boston. The second game of the doubleheader was also won by the Yankees, 2–0. Both runs were scored off of Red Sox starter Nathan Eovaldi in his five innings of work, dropping him to 10–8 on the season. Boston was limited to five hits, all singles, and four walks. The loss left Boston (69–53) in third place in the AL East standings, a percentage point behind the Yankees (68–52). The Yankees completed their sweep with a 5–2 win in the third game of the series. Boston's runs came on solo homers by Bogaerts (first inning) and Hunter Renfroe (ninth inning). Starter Nick Pivetta took the loss after allowing four runs on four hits in 1 2/3 innings.

Red Sox lost the series 0–3 (5–12 runs)

August 20–August 23, vs. Texas Rangers

The Red Sox opened a three-game home series with a 6–0 win over the Rangers. Starter Chris Sale went five innings, allowing five hits, and got the win. Xander Bogaerts hit his 20th home run of the season. Texas won the second game of the series, 10–1, with Kiké Hernández driving in Boston's only run. Starter Eduardo Rodríguez took the loss after allowing five runs on eight hits in 3 2/3 innings. The Red Sox were limited to five hits, while also committing five errors. The final game of the series was postponed a day, due to the effects of Hurricane Henri. The Red Sox won that game, 8–4 in 11 innings. Starter Nathan Eovaldi held Texas to one run on four hits in seven innings and left with a 3–1 lead, but ultimately received a no decision. With Boston still holding a 3–1 lead entering the top of the ninth, the Rangers scored twice off of closer Matt Barnes to tie the game. The game went to extra innings, and both teams scored a single run in the 10th inning. In the 11th inning, the Rangers did not score, and the Red Sox won the game on a walk-off grand slam by Travis Shaw. Reliever Garrett Whitlock got the win after pitching the final 2 2/3 innings for Boston. In addition to Shaw, Alex Verdugo and Hunter Renfroe also homered.

Red Sox won the series 2–1 (15–14 runs)

August 24–August 26, vs. Minnesota Twins

The opener of a three-game home series against Minnesota was an 11–9 Boston win. Starter Tanner Houck had a no decision after allowing three runs on eight hits in 4 2/3 innings. Reliever Josh Taylor, who recorded one out on one pitch to close out the fifth inning, got the win. Closer Matt Barnes allowed a home run and two walks while recording no outs in the ninth inning. He was relieved by Hansel Robles, who earned the save, his 11th of the season and first with the Red Sox. Boston hitters had four home runs: two by Hunter Renfroe and one each by Travis Shaw and Kiké Hernández. The Twins won the second game of the series, 9–6 in 10 innings. Red Sox starter Nick Pivetta allowed four runs on six hits in four innings. Boston did not score until the seventh inning, and entered the bottom of the ninth trailing, 4–2. A two-run home run by Kyle Schwarber tied the game, which then went to extra innings. Robles came in to pitch the 10th for Boston, and allowed five runs via two homers. Robles took the loss after the Red Sox only scored twice in their half of the inning, one run coming on a Hernández homer. The final game of the series was a 12–2 victory by the Red Sox, with Chris Sale getting the win after holding the Twins to two runs on two hits in 5 1/3 innings. Rafael Devers hit his 30th home run of the season, while Bobby Dalbec homered twice and drove in seven runs.

Red Sox won the series 2–1 (29–20 runs)

August 27–August 29, at Cleveland Indians

The Red Sox defeated the Indians, 4–3, in the first game of a three-game series. Prior to the game, Kiké Hernández and Christian Arroyo were placed on the COVID-related injured list. Starter Eduardo Rodríguez notched his 10th win of the season after holding Cleveland to three runs on eight hits in seven innings. Adam Ottavino got the save. Jonathan Araúz, just called up from Triple-A, had a three-run homer, one of only three Boston hits. Boston also won the second game of the series, 5–3 in 10 innings. Starter Nathan Eovaldi went 5 1/3 innings while allowing two runs on six hits. Kyle Schwarber had a first-inning home run, helping to stake the Red Sox to an early 2–0 lead. After Cleveland tied the game, 2–2, in the second inning, there was no more scoring until extra innings. J. D. Martinez put the Red Sox ahead on a three-run homer. The Indians got one run back off of Martín Pérez, who was relieved by Ottavino who earned his 10th save of the season. The win went to Garrett Whitlock, who pitched a scoreless inning as the sixth of eight total Boston pitchers. The Twins won the final game of the series, 7–5, despite Boston building a 4–0 lead after five innings. Starter Tanner Houck went 5 1/3 innings and allowed three runs on one hit and four walks. Austin Davis, the fourth of five Boston pitchers, allowed three runs on three hits and took the loss. Rafael Devers had two home runs and Bobby Dalbec had one.

Red Sox won the series 2–1 (14–13 runs)

August 30–August 31, at Tampa Bay Rays

The Red Sox lost the opener of a four-game series in Tampa Bay, 6–1. Relievers Martín Pérez and Matt Barnes were not available due to being placed on the COVID-related injured list. Starter Nick Pivetta allowed four runs on six hits in five innings and took the loss. A homer by Bobby Dalbec accounted for Boston's only run. Prior to the second game of the series, relievers Josh Taylor and Hirokazu Sawamura were also placed on the COVID-related list, and during the game, shortstop Xander Bogaerts was removed due to a positive test. Tampa Bay won the game, 8–5, with Boston starter Brad Peacock taking the loss in his Red Sox debut after allowing five runs on two hits in 2 1/3 innings. Kyle Schwarber homered. Boston ended the month in third place in the American League East, still in position for the postseason as a wild card, with a record of 75–59.

September

=== September ===
The Red Sox entered September with eight players unavailable due to positive COVID-19 testing or contact tracing: pitchers Matt Barnes, Martín Pérez, Hirokazu Sawamura, and Josh Taylor; and position players Christian Arroyo, Xander Bogaerts, Kiké Hernández, and Yairo Muñoz. Three staff members were also unavailable due to testing or tracing: quality control coach Ramón Vázquez, first base coach Tom Goodwin, and conditioning coach Kiyoshi Momose. With a record of 75–59, and having just lost the first two games of a four-game series against Tampa Bay, the Red Sox were positioned as a wild card team, in third place in the AL East.

September 1–September 2, at Tampa Bay Rays (cont'd)

Boston won the third game of the series, 3–2. Starter Chris Sale went six innings, holding the Rays to two runs on six hits. Reliever Garrett Whitlock pitched two scoreless innings and got the win; Adam Ottavino earned the save, his 11th of the season. Christian Vázquez went 3-for-4 with a home run and two RBIs; Jarren Duran drove in Boston's other run, a go-ahead RBI in the ninth inning to break a 2–2 tie. The final game of the series was another Red Sox win, 4–0. Starter Eduardo Rodríguez went six innings and won his 11th game of the year. Garrett Richards pitched the final three innings, earning a save. Bobby Dalbec went 2-for-4 with two RBIs.

Red Sox split the series 2–2 (13–16 runs)

September 3–September 5, vs. Cleveland Indians

Prior to the first game against Cleveland, outfielder Jarren Duran became Boston's ninth player on the COVID-related list. The Red Sox opened the three-game series with an 8–5 win. Starter Nathan Eovaldi held Cleveland to three runs on six hits in 6 1/3 innings; he was relieved by Adam Ottavino, who was credited with the win; Garrett Whitlock earned a save. Kyle Schwarber had three RBIs, one coming on a leadoff home run in the first inning. Hunter Renfroe also drove in three runs, via a seventh-inning home run with two men on base. Kevin Plawecki and Jonathan Araúz each hit solo home runs. Boston also won the second game of the series, 4–3, the team's fourth consecutive win. Starter Tanner Houck kept the Indians scoreless through five innings, but ended up with a no decision. A three-run home run by Rafael Devers in the seventh inning gave the Red Sox a 3–0 lead; with his 33rd home run of the season, Devers reached 100 RBIs for the second time in his career. In the top of the ninth, Cleveland scored three runs off of Ottavino to tie the game. After Boston loaded the bases with two outs in the bottom of the ninth, Alex Verdugo singled to drive in the winning run. Prior to the final game of the series, pitcher Nick Pivetta and utility player Danny Santana were also added to the COVID-related list, bringing the Red Sox' total to 11 players. The final game was won by Cleveland, 11–5. After the Indians built a 6–0 lead after three innings, the Red Sox battled back within a run, 6–5, at the end of the sixth, only to have the Indians score five runs in the top of the ninth to put the game out of reach. Kutter Crawford, just called up from Triple-A and making his MLB debut, took the loss. J. D. Martinez went 3-for-5 with three RBIs and a home run.

Red Sox won the series 2–1 (17–19 runs)

September 6–September 8, vs. Tampa Bay Rays

Despite taking a 7–1 lead after the first two innings of the series' opening game, the Red Sox lost to the Rays, 11–10 in 10 innings. Boston committed four errors during the game, making six of Tampa Bay's runs unearned. Starter Chris Sale went 3 2/3 innings and allowed one earned run (five total runs) on 10 hits. Garrett Whitlock, the sixth of seven Red Sox pitchers, had a blown save and took the loss. Hunter Renfroe was 3-for-5 with two RBIs, and Jonathan Araúz homered. Home plate umpire Manny Gonzalez was struck by a foul tip in the first inning and had to leave the game. A rare instance of an intentional balk occurred in the bottom of the 10th inning, when the Rays, holding a two-run lead, had pitcher Collin McHugh intentionally commit a balk, thus advancing the Red Sox runner at second base to third base, in order to avoid the possibility of sign stealing. The game took four hours and 54 minutes to complete. The Rays also won the second game of the series, 12–7. Starter Eduardo Rodríguez look the loss after allowing six runs in 3 2/3 innings. Bobby Dalbec had two home runs and four RBIs. Danny Santana also homered. Boston won the final game of the series, 2–1. Scoreless through the first seven innings, the Rays scored once in the top of the eighth, and the Red Sox scored two runs in the bottom of the inning via a Renfroe home run with a runner on base. Renfroe also recorded an outfield assist on the final out of the game, as Tampa Bay's Joey Wendle attempted to stretch a double into a triple. Boston starter Nathan Eovaldi pitched seven scoreless innings but had a no decision, with the win going to Garrett Richards while Hansel Robles earned the save. The Red Sox' win put them back in second place of the AL East at 80–62 (.563), one-half game ahead of the New York Yankees at 78–61 (.561), with both teams in position as postseason wild cards.

Red Sox lost the series 1–2 (19–24 runs)

September 10–September 12, at Chicago White Sox

Prior to the opener of a three-game series in Chicago, Xander Bogaerts was activated from the COVID-related list, while Chris Sale and Jonathan Araúz were added to that list. In the opener, Chicago took a 4–0 lead through four innings, and while the Red Sox then scored three unanswered runs, the game ended 4–3 in the White Sox' favor. Starter Tanner Houck allowed all of Chicago's runs and left after 3 2/3 innings, his record falling to 0–4. Bobby Dalbec hit his 21st home run of the season. Boston won the second game of the series, 9–8 in 10 innings. Prior to the game, utility player Danny Santana was again added to the COVID-related list. Boston starter Connor Seabold, making his MLB debut, allowed two runs on three hits in three innings. Garrett Whitlock, the sixth of seven Boston pitchers, earned the win, with Josh Taylor notching his first major-league save. Travis Shaw was 2-for-5 with a home run and four RBIs. On the day of the final game of the series, reliever Phillips Valdéz became the latest Boston player added to the COVID-related list. Chicago won the game, 2–1. After the White Sox took a 1–0 lead in the bottom of the sixth, the Red Sox tied the game via an Alex Verdugo sacrifice fly in the top of the ninth. Leury García then hit a walk-off home run off of Whitlock with two outs in the bottom of the ninth. Boston starter Nick Pivetta held Chicago to one run on three hits in 5 1/3 innings. The loss dropped the Red Sox (81–64; 0.5586) back to third place in the AL East, with Toronto (80–63; 0.5594) moving into second place.

Red Sox lost the series 1–2 (13–14 runs)

September 13–September 15, at Seattle Mariners

Boston lost the opener of a three-game series in Seattle, 5–4. Starter Eduardo Rodríguez went six innings, allowing one run on six hits. A three-run homer by Seattle's Mitch Haniger off of Red Sox reliever Ryan Brasier put the Mariners ahead, 5–2, in the seventh inning. The runs were unearned, due to a two-out error by first baseman Kyle Schwarber. Back-to-back solo homers by Xander Bogaerts and Rafael Devers in the eighth inning left the Red Sox a run short. José Iglesias also homered. The loss dropped the Red Sox (81–65; 0.555) to fourth place in the AL East, percentage points behind the Yankees (80–64; 0.556). The Red Sox won the second game of the series, 8–4. Starter Nathan Eovaldi allowed two runs on five hits in five innings. Entering the eighth inning with the score tied, 2–2, Boston scored five runs, which proved to be enough to win. Schwarber had a three-RBI pinch hit double as part of the eighth inning rally. Adam Ottavino, the third of six Red Sox pitchers, threw only two pitches and recorded a single out, but got the win. J. D. Martinez, Bobby Dalbec, and Alex Verdugo each homered. Game 3 of the series, an afternoon getaway game, was tied 3–3 after nine innings. All of Seattle's three runs had been allowed by Sox starter Tanner Houck, who pitched 4 1/3 innings. Boston's three runs were made up of a Hunter Renfroe solo homer, a Kevin Plawecki RBI ground out, and a José Iglesias RBI double. Entering the top of the 10th, the Boston offense immediately went to work, as Jack López advanced to third base and then scored on a passed ball to give the Red Sox the lead. J. D. Martinez made it 5–3 on an RBI single before Kyle Schwarber came through in the clutch for the second straight game, delivering a two-run hit to shallow right field. Martinez and Schwarber were then driven in by Christian Vázquez, giving the Red Sox a 9–3 lead. Martín Pérez pitched the bottom of the tenth. Seattle scored one run but was otherwise effectively shut down, and the Red Sox won, 9–4, to win the series against the Mariners.

Red Sox won the series 2–1 (21–13 runs)

September 17–September 19, vs. Baltimore Orioles

The Red Sox began their final home stand of the season with a 7–1 win over the Orioles; it was Baltimore's 100th loss. Boston starter Chris Sale, just activated from the COVID-related list, got the win after holding the Orioles to one run on two hits in five innings. Hunter Renfroe had three RBIs, Alex Verdugo had three hits, and Bobby Dalbec homered. The win moved Boston back to second place in the AL East, slightly ahead of the Yankees and Blue Jays, with the three teams contesting for two wild card spots in the postseason. Boston won the second game of the series, 9–3, with reliever Tanner Houck earning the win. Starter Nick Pivetta went 3 2/3 innings and left with the game tied, 3–3. Xander Bogaerts went 3-for-5 with four RBIs and hit his 22nd home run of the season; Rafael Devers also went 3-for-5. Boston won the final game of the series, 8–6, to complete the sweep. Starter Nathan Eovaldi allowed three runs on seven hits in five innings, and had a no decision. Reliever Hirokazu Sawamura got the win and Garrett Richards earned a save. J. D. Martinez homered.

Red Sox won the series 3–0 (24–10 runs)

September 21–September 22, vs. New York Mets

The Red Sox opened a two-game series against the Mets with a 6–3 win. Starter Eduardo Rodríguez had a no decision after allowing two runs on five hits in 4 1/3 innings. Reliever Ryan Brasier got the win. Kiké Hernández and Xander Bogaerts homered. Boston won the second game of the series, 12–5. Starter Chris Sale earned the win to reach 5–0 on the season. Kyle Schwarber had two home runs to reach 31 on the season (including ones he hit before joining the Red Sox). The two wins over the Mets extended the Red Sox' winning streak to seven games, five of which came with the team wearing their yellow "City Connect" alternate uniforms.

Red Sox won the series 2–0 (18–8 runs)

September 24–September 26, vs. New York Yankees

The Red Sox opened their final home series of the season with an 8–3 loss to the Yankees. The loss reduced the Red Sox' lead in the AL wild card race to a single game over the Yankees, the teams holding records of 88–66 (.571) and 87–67 (.565), respectively. Starter Nathan Eovaldi took the loss after allowing seven runs on seven hits in 2 2/3 innings. Rafael Devers hit his 35th home run of the season. The Yankees won the second game of the series, 5–3. Boston starter Nick Pivetta held New York to one run on three hits in 5 1/3 innings. With the Red Sox holding a 3–1 lead entering the eighth inning, Yankees designated hitter Giancarlo Stanton hit a grand slam off of Red Sox reliever Darwinzon Hernández; two of the runs were charged to prior reliever Tanner Houck, who took the loss. Bobby Dalbec and Kevin Plawecki homered for Boston. Both teams ended the day with records of 88–67 (.568), tied in the AL wild card race. The Yankees completed the sweep with a 6–3 win on Sunday Night Baseball, powered by a four-run eighth inning. Boston starter Eduardo Rodríguez went five innings, holding the Yankees to two runs on six hits. Reliever Garrett Richards allowed two of the eighth-inning runs and took the loss. The loss put the Yankees atop the AL wild card race at 89–67 (.571) with the Red Sox one game back at 88–68 (.564) and the Blue Jays one more game back at 87–69 (.558). The top two wild card teams qualify for a single-game playoff, hosted by the top wild card team, with the winner advancing to the American League Division Series.

Red Sox lost the series 0–3 (9–19 runs)

September 28–September 30, at Baltimore Orioles

The Red Sox lost the opener of a three-game series in Baltimore, 4–2. Starter Chris Sale allowed three runs on four hits in 5 1/3 innings and took the loss. Boston was limited to three hits, one a Kyle Schwarber home run. The day ended with Boston (88–69) still holding the second AL wild card spot, two games behind the Yankees (90–67), a half-game game ahead of Seattle (88–70) and a full game ahead of Toronto (87–70). Boston won the second game of the series, 6–0, to snap a four-game losing streak. Starter Nathan Eovaldi got the win after holding the Orioles to four hits in six innings. J. D. Martinez went 3-for-4 with a home run and three RBIs; Hunter Renfroe also homered. As the Yankees lost to the Blue Jays, Boston (89–69) ended the day one game behind the Yankees (90–68) in the wild card race, with Seattle (89–70) and Toronto (88–70) still in contention. The Orioles won the final game of the series, 6–2. Starter Nick Pivetta took the loss after allowing three runs on four hits in 4 2/3 innings. Kiké Hernández homered for the Red Sox. The loss dropped the Red Sox into a tie with the Mariners for the second AL wild card spot, both teams with 89–70 records.

Red Sox lost the series 1–2 (10–10 runs)

October

=== October ===
Boston entered October having lost five of their last six games, with three games left to play in the regular season. With the Yankees (91–68) holding the top wild card spot in the American League, the Red Sox (89–70) and Mariners (89–70) were tied for the second wild card spot, followed by the Blue Jays (88–71).

October 1–October 3, at Washington Nationals

To open the final series of the regular season, the Red Sox defeated the Nationals, 4–2. Starter Eduardo Rodríguez got the win after holding Washington scoreless through five innings, and Hansel Robles earned a save. Hunter Renfroe and Bobby Dalbec homered. The Red Sox pulled within a game of the Yankees, who lost to the Rays, for the top wild card spot. The Mariners lost to the Angels, while the Blue Jays stayed in contention by beating the Orioles. Records at the end of October 1: Yankees (91–69), Red Sox (90–70), Mariners (89–71), Blue Jays (89–71)

Boston won the second game against Washington, 5–3. Starter Tanner Houck did not allow a baserunner in five innings of work, striking out eight of the 15 batters he faced, but received a no decision. Austin Davis, the fifth of six Red Sox pitchers, got the win, with Robles again earning a save. Rafael Devers and Kike Hernández both homered. With the Yankees losing to the Rays, the Red Sox moved into a tie for the top AL wild card spot. The Blue Jays stayed in contention with a win over the Orioles, as did the Mariners via a late rally to defeat the Angels. Records at the end of October 2: Red Sox (91–70), Yankees (91–70), Mariners (90–71), Blue Jays (90–71)

Boston completed a sweep of the Nationals with a 7–5 come-from-behind win. Starter Chris Sale was lifted after 2 1/3 innings, having allowed two runs on four hits and three walks. Trailing 5–1 after five innings, the Red Sox scored once in the sixth and three times in the seventh to tie the game. A two-run home run by Devers in the ninth inning, his second homer of the game, provided the winning margin. The win went to Eduardo Rodríguez, who pitched an inning in relief, with the save going to Nick Pivetta, who also pitched out of the bullpen as Boston used a total of seven pitchers. With the Yankees beating the Rays, Boston and New York ended in a tie atop the AL wild card standings, with Boston earning home field advantage via their 10–9 regular-season head-to-head record against New York. Records at the end of October 3: Red Sox (92–70), Yankees (92–70), Blue Jays (91–71), Mariners (90–72).

Red Sox won the series 3–0 (16–10 runs)

This was the eighth time for the Red Sox to qualify for the postseason as a wild card team since the expansion of the MLB postseason in 1994, and the first time since 2009.

== Postseason ==
=== American League Wild Card Game vs. New York Yankees ===
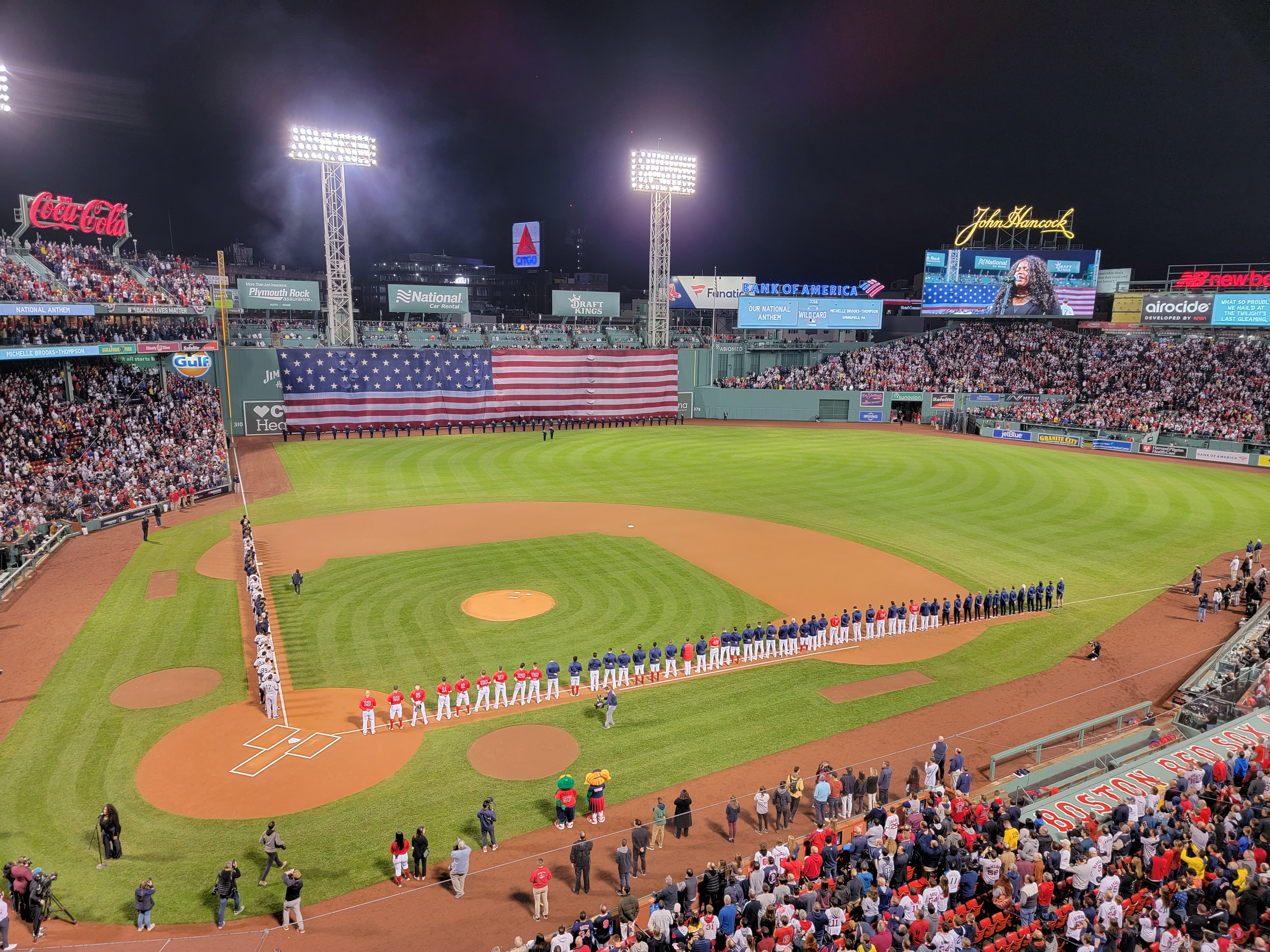
Wild Card Game during the National Anthem

The Red Sox entered the Wild Card Game as the fourth seed in the American League, hosting the fifth-seeded Yankees. Nathan Eovaldi and Gerrit Cole were the starting pitchers, respectively. J. D. Martinez, who injured his ankle in the final game of the regular season, was not included on Boston's roster for the game.

Boston took an early 2–0 lead, via a two-run homer by Xander Bogaerts in the first inning. A solo home run by Kyle Schwarber in the third inning extended the lead to 3–0. Cole left without recording an out in the third, having allowed three runs on four hits; he was replaced by Clay Holmes. A solo home run by Anthony Rizzo in the top of the sixth made it a 3–1 game. Eovaldi left with one out in the sixth; he was replaced by Ryan Brasier. A New York rally was snuffed out when Aaron Judge was thrown out at the plate attempting to score from first on a Giancarlo Stanton single off of the Green Monster. Alex Verdugo's RBI double in the bottom of the sixth put Boston ahead by three again, 4–1. Verdugo drove in another two runs in the seventh, extending Boston's lead to 6–1. Stanton homered with one out in the ninth, but the Yankees could not rally further as the Red Sox won, 6–2.

Red Sox won the series 1–0 (6–2 runs)

=== American League Division Series vs. Tampa Bay Rays ===
This was the third postseason matchup between the Red Sox and Rays. Their previous postseason meetings were in the 2008 ALCS, won by the Rays in seven games, and in the 2013 ALDS, won by the Red Sox in four games.

ALDS Results
Game	Date	Day	Result	Location	Television	Series	Box score
1	October 7	Thursday	Red Sox 0, Rays 5	Tropicana Field	Fox Sports 1	Rays, 1–0	
2	October 8	Friday	Red Sox 14, Rays 6	Tropicana Field	Fox Sports 1	tied, 1–1	
3	October 10	Sunday	Rays 4, Red Sox 6 (13)	Fenway Park	MLB Network	Red Sox, 2–1	
4	October 11	Monday	Rays 5, Red Sox 6	Fenway Park	Fox Sports 1	Red Sox, 3–1	

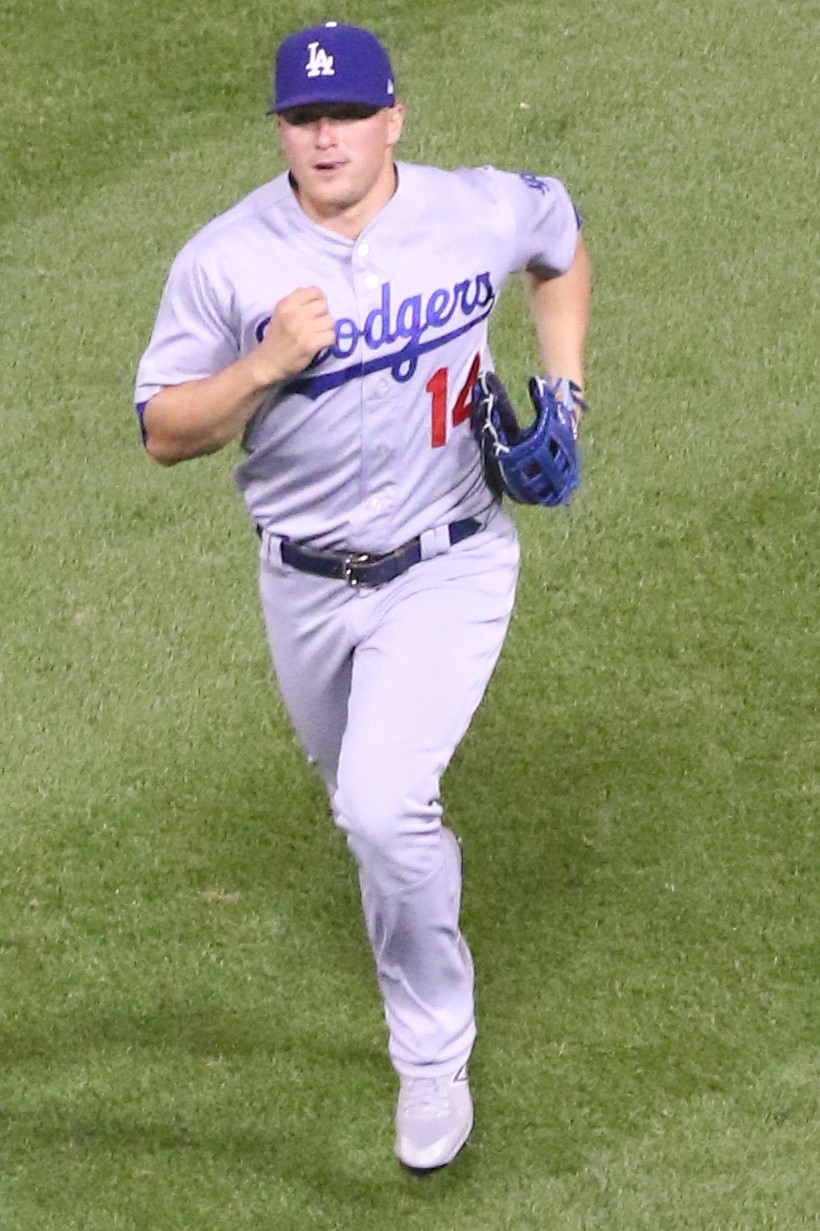
Kike Hernández, pictured with the Dodgers, had five hits and three RBIs for Boston in Game 2.

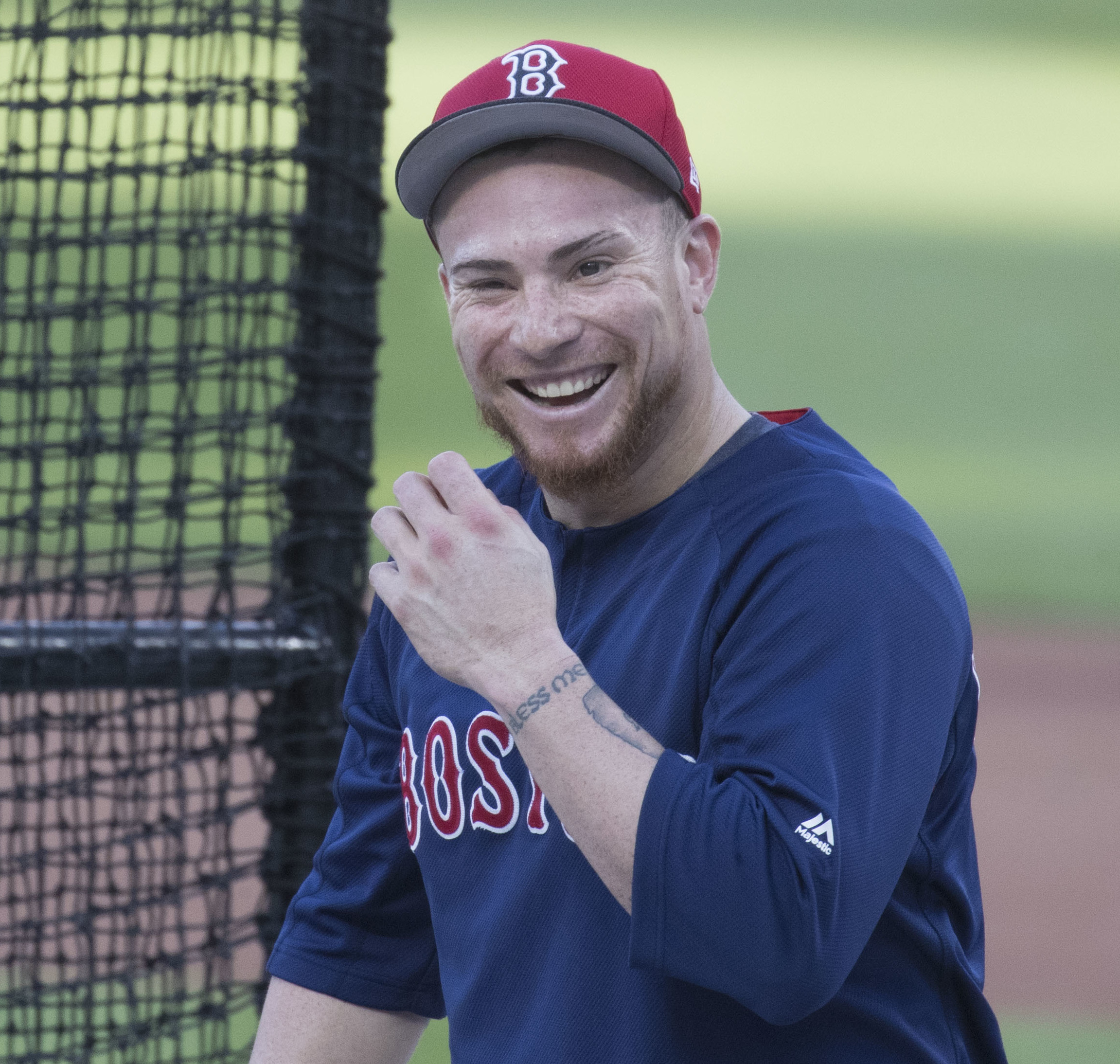
Christian Vázquez hit a walk-off home run in the 13th inning of Boston's Game 3 win.

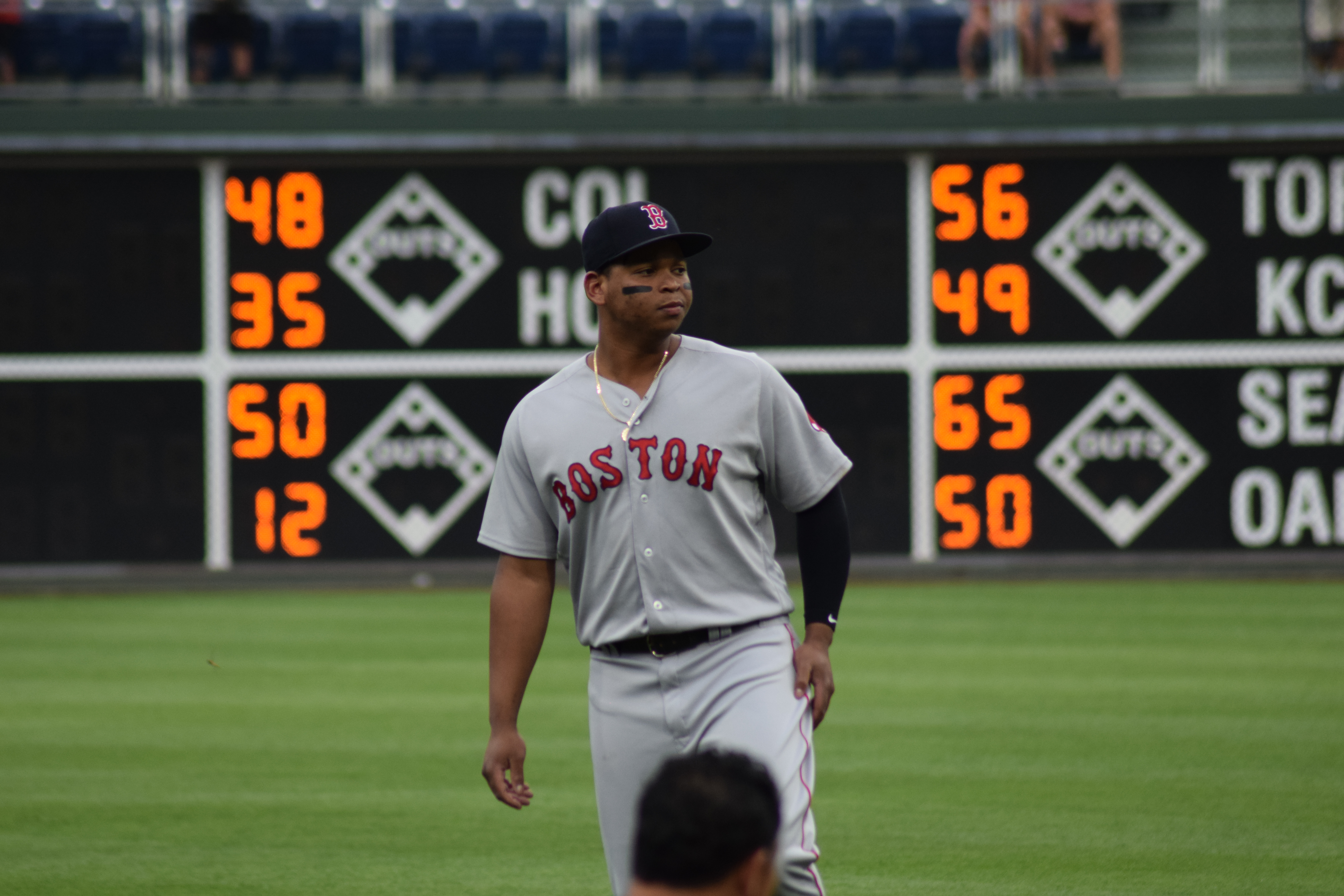
Rafael Devers went 3-for-4 with three RBIs in Game 4.

==== Game 1 ====
For the ALDS roster, Boston added J. D. Martinez, Martín Pérez, Chris Sale, and Danny Santana, while omitting Jonathan Araúz, Matt Barnes, Jarren Duran, and Connor Wong.

Tampa Bay won the opening game of the series, 5–0. Boston started Eduardo Rodríguez took the loss after allowing two runs on two hits and two walks in 1 2/3 innings. Tampa Bay's other three runs were charged to Nick Pivetta, who pitched 4 2/3 innings of relief. Randy Arozarena of the Rays walked against Pivetta in the seventh inning, advanced to third base on a double by Wander Franco, and then stole home against Josh Taylor, who had relieved Pivetta. The Red Sox outhit the Rays, 9–6, but went 1-for-7 with runners in scoring position.

==== Game 2 ====
Prior to the second game of the series, Boston added Matt Barnes to their active roster, replacing Garrett Richards, who was placed on the injured list with a strained left hamstring.

Boston evened the series at 1–1 with a 14–6 win in Game 2. After the Red Sox scored twice in the top of the first inning, the Rays scored five runs off of Chris Sale in the bottom of the inning, including a grand slam by Jordan Luplow. The Boston bullpen, led by five innings from Tanner Houck, allowed just one more run by Tampa Bay—a home run by Ji-man Choi—for the rest of the game. Meanwhile, the Red Sox scored 12 more runs and had five batters with three or more hits. Kiké Hernández had five hits including a home run and three doubles. Xander Bogaerts, Alex Verdugo, J. D. Martinez, and Rafael Devers also homered. Houck got the win in relief for Boston, while Tampa Bay reliever Collin McHugh, who allowed three runs on two hits and a walk in 1 2/3 innings, took the loss.

==== Game 3 ====
Boston took a 2–1 lead in the series with a 6–4 win in a 13-inning Game 3. The Rays scored twice in the top of the first inning, via a two-run homer by Austin Meadows. The Red Sox got a run back in the bottom of the inning on a Kyle Schwarber solo homer. Boston went ahead, 3–2, on four consecutive singles that scored two runs in the bottom of the third, and extended the lead to 4–2 via a fifth-inning solo home run by Kiké Hernández. In the top of the eighth, Wander Franco homered and Randy Arozarena hit an RBI double, both off of Hansel Robles, as the Rays tied the game, 4–4. After a scoreless ninth inning, the game went to extra innings. Nick Pivetta, expected to be Boston's starting pitcher in Game 4, came on in relief and held the Rays scoreless in the top of the 10th, while the Rays' David Robertson held Boston scoreless in the bottom of the inning. Both Pivetta and Robertson stayed in the game and pitched a scoreless 11th inning. Pivetta again held the Rays scoreless in the top of the 12th, while Luis Patiño held the Red Sox scoreless in the bottom of the inning. Pivetta pitched a fourth scoreless inning, the 13th, which included a ground-rule double by Kevin Kiermaier—the batted ball bounced off of the right field wall, the ground, and then off of Hunter Renfroe into the bullpen—which otherwise would have resulted in a Rays run, as Yandy Díaz was running from first base when the ball was hit. Christian Vázquez ended the game via a two-run walk-off home run off of Patiño in the bottom of the 13th.

==== Game 4 ====
The Red Sox won Game 4, 6–5, to advance to the ALCS. Eduardo Rodríguez, who had lost Game 1 but only threw 41 pitches, started for Boston, while Collin McHugh, who had lost Game 2 in relief, started for Tampa Bay. After two scoreless innings, Boston scored five runs in the bottom of the third, including a three-run homer by Rafael Devers. The Rays got one run back in the top of the fifth. In the top of the sixth, a two-run homer by Wander Franco cut Boston's lead to 5–3. The Rays opened the eighth with three consecutive hits off of Ryan Brasier to tie the game, 5–5; Garrett Whitlock relieved Brasier and ended the rally. An outfield assist by Kevin Kiermaier cut down Alex Verdugo at third base to end a Red Sox threat in the bottom of the eighth. Whitlock then retired the Rays in order on seven pitches in the top of the ninth. After the Red Sox put runners at second and third with one out in the bottom of the ninth, a sacrifice fly by Kiké Hernández pushed across the winning run.

=== American League Championship Series vs. Houston Astros ===
The Red Sox and Houston Astros, who had home field advantage, met in a rematch of the 2018 ALCS, which was won by Boston in five games.

ALCS Schedule
Game	Date	Day	Start time / Result	Location	Television	Series	Box score
1	October 15	Friday	Red Sox 4, Astros 5	Minute Maid Park	Fox	Astros, 1–0	
2	October 16	Saturday	Red Sox 9, Astros 5	Minute Maid Park	Fox / Fox Sports 1	tied, 1–1	
3	October 18	Monday	Astros 3, Red Sox 12	Fenway Park	Fox Sports 1	Red Sox, 2–1	
4	October 19	Tuesday	Astros 9, Red Sox 2	Fenway Park	Fox Sports 1	tied, 2–2	
5	October 20	Wednesday	Astros 9, Red Sox 1	Fenway Park	Fox Sports 1	Astros, 3–2	
6	October 22	Friday	Red Sox 0, Astros 5	Minute Maid Park	Fox Sports 1	Astros, 4–2	

==== Game 1 ====
For the ALCS roster, manager Alex Cora made two changes to Red Sox' bullpen; Darwinzon Hernández and Hirokazu Sawamura were added, while Matt Barnes and Austin Davis were removed.

Houston took a 1–0 lead in the series via a 5–4 win in Game 1. The Red Sox loaded the bases with two outs in the top of the first, but were unable to score. The Astros scored a run in the bottom of the first; Jose Altuve, who had drawn a leadoff walk, scored on a sacrifice fly by Yordan Alvarez. In the bottom of the second, Houston loaded the bases with one out but did not score. A leadoff home run by Kiké Hernández in the top of the third tied the game. A one-out walk by Xander Bogaerts, followed by a single and an error, gave Boston a 2–1 lead, and Hunter Renfroe then doubled to make it a 3–1 game. With two out in the top of the third, Yimi García relieved Houston starter Framber Valdez. Boston starter Chris Sale left with two on and two out in the bottom of the third, relieved by Adam Ottavino. A two-run homer by Altuve off of Tanner Houck with two out in the bottom of the sixth tied the game, 3–3. Carlos Correa put Houston ahead, 4–3, with a solo home run in the bottom of the seventh off of Hansel Robles. After the Astros loaded the bases with none out in the bottom of the eighth off of Sawamura, an Altuve sacrifice fly gave Houston a 5–3 lead. Boston got a run back to start the ninth, as Hernández homered off of Houston closer Ryan Pressly. Pressly then retired the next three batters, giving Houston the win. The teams combined to use 16 total pitchers in the game, eight each.

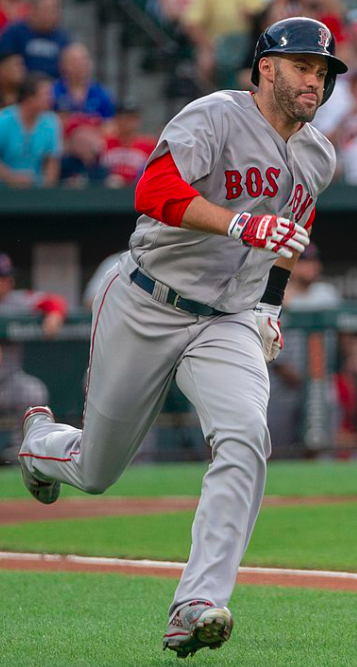
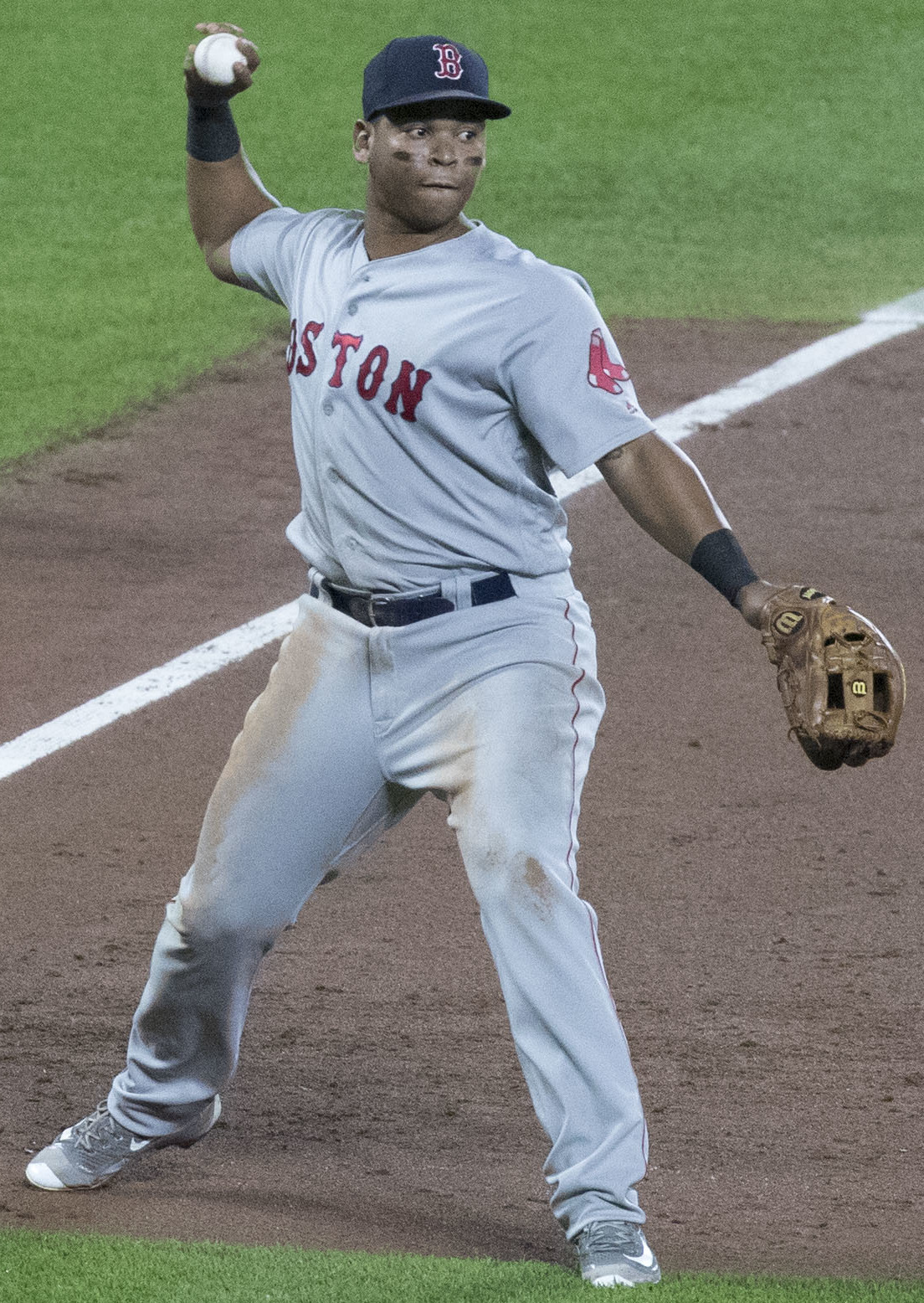
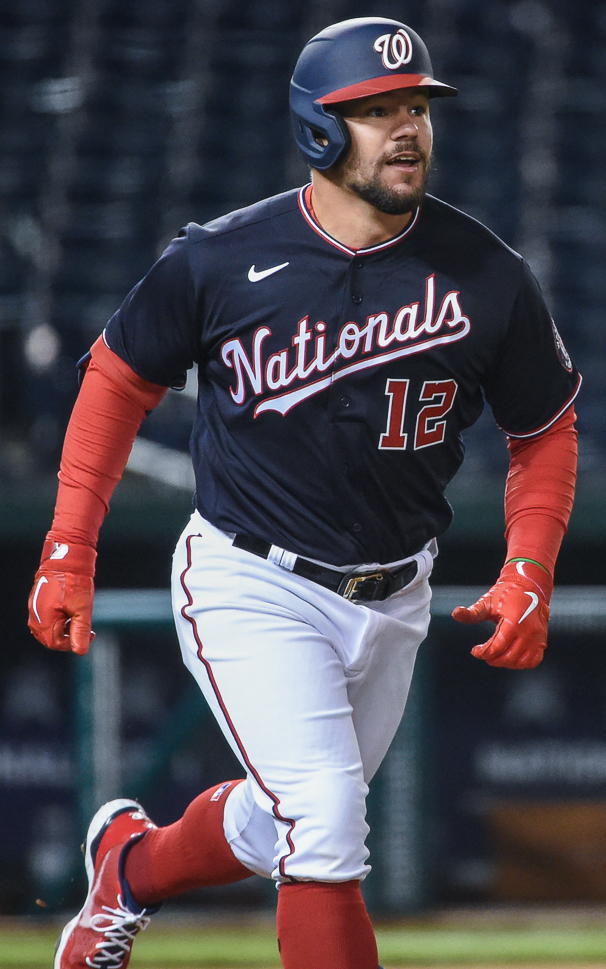
Boston had grand slams by (from left) J. D. Martinez (Game 2), Rafael Devers (Game 2), and Kyle Schwarber (Game 3).

==== Game 2 ====
Boston tied the series at one game each with a 9–5 win in Game 2. Starting pitchers were Nathan Eovaldi for Boston, and Luis García for Houston. J. D. Martinez hit a grand slam in the top of the first to give Boston a 4–0 lead over the Astros. It was the first postseason grand slam in the first inning by a Red Sox player since J. D. Drew in 2007 ALCS Game 6. García left with none out in the top of the second due to knee discomfort. Rafael Devers hit a second grand slam in the top of the second, making the Red Sox the first team in postseason history to hit two grand slams in one game. A fourth-inning homer by Kiké Hernández, his third of the series, made it 9–0. The Astros rallied with two outs in the bottom of the fourth for three runs, trimming Boston's lead to 9–3. Eovaldi left after 5 1/3 innings, relieved by Adam Ottavino. Yuli Gurriel and Jason Castro each hit solo home runs off of Darwinzon Hernández in the bottom of the ninth, making it 9–5, the final score.

==== Game 3 ====
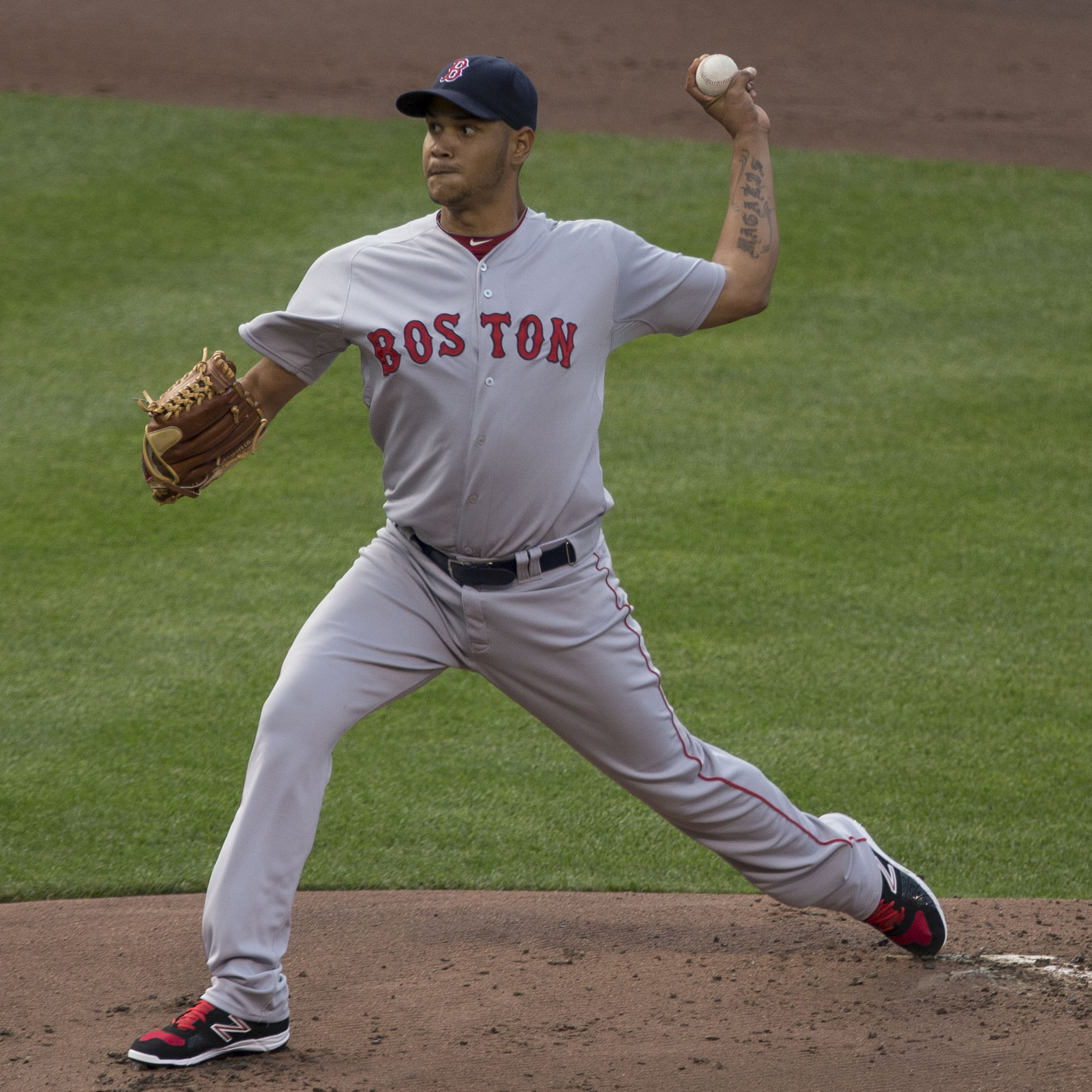
Eduardo Rodríguez earned the win in Game 3 in what would turn out to be his last start as a member of the Red Sox.

Boston won Game 3, 12–3, to take a 2–1 lead in the series. Eduardo Rodríguez started for Boston and José Urquidy started for Houston. The Red Sox sent 11 men to the plate in the bottom of the second, scoring six runs. Four of the runs came on a grand slam by Kyle Schwarber, the third by a Red Sox batter in two games. Urquidy left with two outs in the second, having allowed six runs (five earned) on five hits and two walks while striking out one batter. Boston added three runs in the bottom of the third, including a two-run homer by Christian Arroyo, extending the Red Sox' lead to 9–0. Astros right fielder Kyle Tucker hit a three-run homer with two out in the top of the fourth, making it a 9–3 game. Boston made it 11–3 in the bottom of the sixth via a two-run homer by J. D. Martinez. Hansel Robles relieved Rodríguez in the top of the seventh, Rodríguez allowed three runs on five hits and no walks while striking out seven in what would turn out to be his final start in a Red Sox uniform. Rafael Devers hit a solo home run in the bottom of the eighth, extending the lead to 12–3, the final score.

==== Game 4 ====
Houston won Game 4, 9–2, powered by a seven-run ninth inning to even the series, 2–2. Nick Pivetta started for Boston and Zack Greinke started for Houston. The Astros took an early 1–0 lead via a solo home run by Alex Bregman with two outs in the top of the first. In the bottom of the first, Rafael Devers walked with two outs, then Xander Bogaerts homered to give the Red Sox a 2–1 lead. Greinke left with one out in the bottom of the second, having allowed two runs on one hit and three walks; he did not strike out a batter. Christian Arroyo hit a one-out triple in the bottom of the fourth, but the Red Sox were unable to score him. Bogaerts hit a one-out double in the bottom of the fifth and was also left stranded. Pivetta left after the fifth inning, having allowed one run on two hits and two walks; he struck out three. Jose Altuve tied the game, 2–2, with a home run off of Garrett Whitlock to lead off the eighth inning. Nate Eovaldi came in to pitch the top of the ninth, and Carlos Correa led off with a double over Hunter Renfroe in right field. With two outs, Jason Castro singled to drive in Correa and give the Astros a 3–2 lead. Houston was able to load the bases, and Boston brought in Martín Pérez. Michael Brantley hit his first pitch for a double that scored three runs, giving Houston a 6–2 lead. A single by Yordan Alvarez plated another run, making it 7–2. Correa, batting for the second time in the inning, hit a ball fielded by Pérez that was thrown away for an error, allowing another run to score, and a single by Kyle Tucker drove in the Astros' seventh and final run of the inning. Houston closer Ryan Pressly came in to pitch the bottom of the ninth; he allowed two singles, but prevented Boston from scoring as Houston evened the series.

==== Game 5 ====
Houston won Game 5 by a 9–1 score, putting them a win away from the AL pennant, with the remaining game(s) of the series to be played in Houston. Chris Sale started for the Red Sox and Framber Valdez started for the Astros. Houston took a 1–0 lead on a solo home run by Yordan Alvarez in the top of the second inning. Valdez did not allow a Boston baserunner until the fifth inning. The Astros scored five runs in the top of the sixth, chasing Sale with one out. Houston's runs came on four hits, a walk, and an error, giving the Astros a 6–0 lead. The teams traded runs in the seventh, making it 7–1. Boston's only run of the game was a solo homer by Rafael Devers. Houston added two more runs in the top of the ninth, for the 9–1 final. Valdez went eight innings and got the win, limiting Boston to one run on three hits and a walk while striking out five batters. Sale took the loss, having pitched 5 1/3 inning while allowing four runs (two earned) on three hits and two walks while striking out seven.

==== Game 6 ====
Luis García started for Houston and Nathan Eovaldi for Boston, a rematch of Game 2. The Astros took a 1–0 lead in the bottom of the first; with two outs, Alex Bregman singled then was driven in on a double by Yordan Alvarez that hit off the glove of Red Sox center fielder Kiké Hernández. In the bottom of the fourth, Houston had runners on second and third with no outs, but Eovaldi struck out the next two batters, intentionally walked Yuli Gurriel, and then struck out Chas McCormick to end the threat. Eovaldi left with one out in the bottom of the fifth, having allowed one run on five hits while striking out four; he was relieved by Josh Taylor. García held the Red Sox hitless through five innings; he left in the top of the sixth after allowing a two-out triple to Hernández. García was relieved by Phil Maton, who ended the threat by getting Rafael Devers to pop out. Alvarez opened the bottom of the sixth with a triple off of Taylor near the right-field line. After Carlos Correa was hit by a pitch from Tanner Houck, Kyle Tucker grounded into a double play, scoring Alvarez and giving Houston a 2–0 lead. In the top of the seventh, Boston had runners at first and third with one out; Kendall Graveman struck out Travis Shaw and catcher Martín Maldonado threw out Alex Verdugo, who had been running on the pitch, at second base to end the inning. Alvarez collected his fourth hit of the game in the bottom of the eighth, singling to give the Astros runners at first and second with one out. After Correa grounded out, Tucker homered off of Adam Ottavino, extending Houston's lead to 5–0. Astros closer Ryan Pressly entered to pitch the top of the ninth. He retired the side in order, as Houston advanced to the World Series.

=== Postseason rosters ===
Playoff rosters
American League Wild Card Game

- Pitchers: 0 Adam Ottavino 17 Nathan Eovaldi 32 Matt Barnes 37 Nick Pivetta 38 Josh Taylor 43 Garrett Richards 56 Hansel Robles 57 Eduardo Rodríguez 65 Austin Davis 70 Ryan Brasier 72 Garrett Whitlock 89 Tanner Houck
- Catchers: 7 Christian Vázquez 25 Kevin Plawecki 74 Connor Wong
- Infielders: 2 Xander Bogaerts 3 Jonathan Araúz 11 Rafael Devers 23 Travis Shaw 29 Bobby Dalbec 39 Christian Arroyo
- Oufielders: 5 Kiké Hernández 10 Hunter Renfroe 18 Kyle Schwarber 40 Jarren Duran 99 Alex Verdugo

American League Division Series

- Pitchers: 0 Adam Ottavino 17 Nathan Eovaldi 32 Matt Barnes (Games 2–4) 37 Nick Pivetta 38 Josh Taylor 41 Chris Sale 43 Garrett Richards (Game 1) 54 Martín Pérez 56 Hansel Robles 57 Eduardo Rodríguez 65 Austin Davis 70 Ryan Brasier 72 Garrett Whitlock 89 Tanner Houck
- Catchers: 7 Christian Vázquez 25 Kevin Plawecki
- Infielders: 2 Xander Bogaerts 11 Rafael Devers 23 Travis Shaw 29 Bobby Dalbec 39 Christian Arroyo
- Outfielders: 5 Kiké Hernández 10 Hunter Renfroe 18 Kyle Schwarber 22 Danny Santana 99 Alex Verdugo
- Designated hitters: 28 J. D. Martinez

American League Championship Series

- Pitchers: 0 Adam Ottavino 17 Nathan Eovaldi 19 Hirokazu Sawamura 37 Nick Pivetta 38 Josh Taylor 41 Chris Sale 54 Martín Pérez 56 Hansel Robles 57 Eduardo Rodríguez 63 Darwinzon Hernández 70 Ryan Brasier 72 Garrett Whitlock 89 Tanner Houck
- Catchers: 7 Christian Vázquez 25 Kevin Plawecki
- Infielders: 2 Xander Bogaerts 11 Rafael Devers 23 Travis Shaw 29 Bobby Dalbec 39 Christian Arroyo
- Outfielders: 5 Kiké Hernández 10 Hunter Renfroe 18 Kyle Schwarber 22 Danny Santana 99 Alex Verdugo
- Designated hitters: 28 J. D. Martinez

== Season standings ==
=== American League East ===
AL East
Team	W	L	Pct.	GB	Home	Road
Tampa Bay Rays	100	62	.617	—	52‍–‍29	48‍–‍33
Boston Red Sox	92	70	.568	8	49‍–‍32	43‍–‍38
New York Yankees	92	70	.568	8	46‍–‍35	46‍–‍35
Toronto Blue Jays	91	71	.562	9	47‍–‍33	44‍–‍38
Baltimore Orioles	52	110	.321	48	27‍–‍54	25‍–‍56

=== American League Wild Card ===
Division leaders
Team	W	L	Pct.
Tampa Bay Rays	100	62	.617
Houston Astros	95	67	.586
Chicago White Sox	93	69	.574

Wild Card teams (Top 2 teams qualify for postseason)
Team	W	L	Pct.	GB
Boston Red Sox	92	70	.568	—
New York Yankees	92	70	.568	—
Toronto Blue Jays	91	71	.562	1
Seattle Mariners	90	72	.556	2
Oakland Athletics	86	76	.531	6
Cleveland Indians	80	82	.494	12
Los Angeles Angels	77	85	.475	15
Detroit Tigers	77	85	.475	15
Kansas City Royals	74	88	.457	18
Minnesota Twins	73	89	.451	19
Texas Rangers	60	102	.370	32
Baltimore Orioles	52	110	.321	40

=== Red Sox team leaders ===
Batting
Batting average†	Xander Bogaerts	.295
RBIs	Rafael Devers	113
Home runs	Rafael Devers	38
Runs scored	Rafael Devers	101
Stolen bases	Christian Vázquez	8
Pitching
Wins	Eduardo Rodríguez	13
ERA‡	Nathan Eovaldi	3.75
WHIP‡	Nathan Eovaldi	1.19
Strikeouts	Nathan Eovaldi	195
Saves	Matt Barnes	24

Updated through end of the regular season.
† Minimum 3.1 plate appearances per team games played
AVG qualified batters: Bogaerts, Devers, Hernández, Martinez, Renfroe, Verdugo
‡ Minimum 1 inning pitched per team games played
ERA & WHIP qualified pitchers: Eovaldi

=== Record against opponents ===
==== American League ====
2021 American League record Source: MLB Standings Grid – 2021
Team	BAL	BOS	CWS	CLE	DET	HOU	KC	LAA	MIN	NYY	OAK	SEA	TB	TEX	TOR	NL
Baltimore	—	6–13	0–7	2–5	2–5	3–3	4–3	2–4	2–4	8–11	3–3	3–4	1–18	4–3	5–14	7–13
Boston	13–6	—	3–4	4–2	3–3	2–5	5–2	3–3	5–2	10–9	3–3	4–3	8–11	3–4	10–9	16–4
Chicago	7–0	4–3	—	10–9	12–7	2–5	9–10	2–5	13–6	1–5	4–3	3–3	3–3	5–1	4–3	14–6
Cleveland	5–2	2–4	9–10	—	12–7	1–6	14–5	5–1	8–11	3–4	2–4	3–4	1–6	4–2	2–5	9–11
Detroit	5–2	3–3	7–12	7–12	—	5–2	8–11	1–6	8–11	3–3	1–6	5–1	4–3	6–1	3–3	11–9
Houston	3–3	5–2	5–2	6–1	2–5	—	3–4	13–6	3–4	2–4	11–8	11–8	4–2	14–5	4–2	9–11
Kansas City	3–4	2–5	10–9	5–14	11–8	4–3	—	2–4	10–9	2–4	2–5	4–3	2–4	2–4	3–4	12–8
Los Angeles	4–2	3–3	5–2	1–5	6–1	6–13	4–2	—	5–2	4–3	4–15	8–11	1–6	11–8	4–3	11–9
Minnesota	4–2	2–5	6–13	11–8	11–8	4–3	9–10	2–5	—	1–6	1–5	2–4	3–3	4–3	3–4	10–10
New York	11–8	9–10	5–1	4–3	3–3	4–2	4–2	3–4	6–1	—	4–3	5–2	8–11	6–1	8–11	12–8
Oakland	3–3	3–3	3–4	4–2	6–1	8–11	5–2	15–4	5–1	3–4	—	4–15	4–3	10–9	2–5	11–9
Seattle	4–3	3–4	3–3	4–3	1–5	8–11	3–4	11–8	4–2	2–5	15–4	—	6–1	13–6	4–2	9–11
Tampa Bay	18–1	11–8	3–3	6–1	3–4	2–4	4–2	6–1	3–3	11–8	3–4	1–6	—	3–4	11–8	15–5
Texas	3–4	4–3	1–5	2–4	1–6	5–14	4–2	8–11	3–4	1–6	9–10	6–13	4–3	—	2–4	7–13
Toronto	14–5	9–10	3–4	5–2	3–3	2–4	4–3	3–4	4–3	11–8	5–2	2–4	8–11	4–2	—	14–6

Updated with the results of all games through October 3, 2021.

==== National League ====
Red Sox vs. National League East
Team	ATL	MIA	NYM	PHI	WSH
Boston	3–1	3–0	4–0	3–3	3–0

Reflects all interleague games of the regular season.

== Game log ==
Red Sox Win	Red Sox Loss	Game postponed	Clinched Playoff Spot

2021 Boston Red Sox Season Game Log: 92–70 (Home: 49–32; Away: 43–38)
April: 17–10 (Home: 8–8; Away: 9–2)

#	Date	Opponent	Score	Win	Loss	Save	Stadium	Attendance	Record	Box/ Streak
—	April 1	Orioles	Postponed (rain). Makeup date April 2.							
1	April 2	Orioles	0–3	Means (1–0)	Eovaldi (0–1)	Valdez (1)	Fenway Park	4,452	0–1	L1
2	April 3	Orioles	2–4	Plutko (1–0)	Houck (0–1)	Valdez (2)	Fenway Park	4,571	0–2	L2
3	April 4	Orioles	3–11	Zimmermann (1–0)	Richards (0–1)	—	Fenway Park	4,458	0–3	L3
4	April 5	Rays	11–2	Pivetta (1–0)	Wacha (0–1)	—	Fenway Park	4,577	1–3	W1
5	April 6	Rays	6–5 (12)	Valdéz (1–0)	Thompson (0–1)	—	Fenway Park	4,682	2–3	W2
6	April 7	Rays	9–2	Eovaldi (1–1)	Yarbrough (0–1)	—	Fenway Park	4,751	3–3	W3
7	April 8	@ Orioles	7–3	Rodríguez (1–0)	Harvey (0–1)	—	Camden Yards	10,150	4–3	W4
8	April 10	@ Orioles	6–4 (10)	Barnes (1–0)	Tate (0–1)	Andriese (1)	Camden Yards	9,307	5–3	W5
9	April 11	@ Orioles	14–9	Pivetta (2–0)	López (0–2)	—	Camden Yards	8,171	6–3	W6
–	April 12	@ Twins	Postponed (protests due to killing of Daunte Wright). Makeup date April 14.							
10	April 13	@ Twins	4–2	Ottavino (1–0)	Dobnak (0–2)	Barnes (1)	Target Field	6,724	7–3	W7
11	April 14 (1)	@ Twins	3–2 (7)	Eovaldi (2–1)	Maeda (1–1)	Barnes (2)	Target Field	7,074	8–3	W8
12	April 14 (2)	@ Twins	7–1 (7)	Rodríguez (2–0)	Berríos (2–1)	—	Target Field	7,074	9–3	W9
13	April 15	@ Twins	3–4	Colomé (1–1)	Ottavino (1–1)	—	Target Field	7,925	9–4	L1
—	April 16	White Sox	Postponed (snow). Makeup date April 18.							
14	April 17	White Sox	7–4	Ottavino (2–1)	Heuer (1–1)	—	Fenway Park	4,668	10–4	W1
15	April 18 (1)	White Sox	2–3 (7)	Keuchel (1–0)	Houck (0–2)	Hendriks (2)	Fenway Park	4,679	10–5	L1
16	April 18 (2)	White Sox	1–5 (7)	Foster (1–1)	Pérez (0–1)	—	Fenway Park	4,601	10–6	L2
17	April 19	White Sox	11–4	Eovaldi (3–1)	Giolito (1–1)	—	Fenway Park	4,738	11–6	W1
18	April 20	Blue Jays	4–2	Rodríguez (3–0)	Ryu (1–2)	Barnes (3)	Fenway Park	4,728	12–6	W2
19	April 21	Blue Jays	3–6	Borucki (2–1)	Richards (0–2)	Castro (1)	Fenway Park	4,661	12–7	L1
20	April 22	Mariners	3–7 (10)	Montero (2–0)	Hernández (0–1)	—	Fenway Park	4,617	12–8	L2
21	April 23	Mariners	6–5	Sawamura (1–0)	Kikuchi (0–1)	—	Fenway Park	4,646	13–8	W1
22	April 24	Mariners	2–8	Flexen (2–1)	Eovaldi (3–2)	—	Fenway Park	4,621	13–9	L1
23	April 25	Mariners	5–3	Rodríguez (4–0)	Margevicius (0–2)	Barnes (4)	Fenway Park	4,510	14–9	W1
24	April 27	@ Mets	2–1	Richards (1–2)	Peterson (1–3)	Barnes (5)	Citi Field	7,917	15–9	W2
25	April 28	@ Mets	1–0	Pivetta (3–0)	deGrom (2–2)	Barnes (6)	Citi Field	8,051	16–9	W3
26	April 29	@ Rangers	1–4	Gibson (3–0)	Pérez (0–2)	Kennedy (5)	Globe Life Field	23,640	16–10	L1
27	April 30	@ Rangers	6–1	Eovaldi (4–2)	Arihara (2–3)	—	Globe Life Field	28,267	17–10	W1

May: 15–11 (Home: 8–5; Away: 7–6)

#	Date	Opponent	Score	Win	Loss	Save	Stadium	Attendance	Record	Box/ Streak
28	May 1	@ Rangers	6–8	Sborz (2–1)	Andriese (0–1)	Kennedy (6)	Globe Life Field	35,129	17–11	L1
29	May 2	@ Rangers	3–5	Sborz (3–1)	Ottavino (2–2)	Kennedy (7)	Globe Life Field	29,190	17–12	L2
30	May 4	Tigers	11–7	Pivetta (4–0)	Fulmer (1–2)	Barnes (7)	Fenway Park	4,677	18–12	W1
31	May 5	Tigers	5–6 (10)	Soto (2–1)	Whitlock (0–1)	Fulmer (1)	Fenway Park	4,661	18–13	L1
32	May 6	Tigers	12–9	Andriese (1–1)	Lange (0–1)	Ottavino (1)	Fenway Park	4,734	19–13	W1
33	May 7	@ Orioles	6–2	Rodríguez (5–0)	Harvey (3–2)	—	Camden Yards	7,724	20–13	W2
34	May 8	@ Orioles	11–6	Richards (2–2)	Lowther (0–1)	—	Camden Yards	10,598	21–13	W3
35	May 9	@ Orioles	4–3	Pivetta (5–0)	Kremer (0–3)	Barnes (8)	Camden Yards	10,274	22–13	W4
36	May 10	@ Orioles	1–4	Scott (2–2)	Andriese (1–2)	Valdez (8)	Camden Yards	6,826	22–14	L1
37	May 11	Athletics	2–3	Bassitt (3–2)	Hernández (0–2)	Diekman (4)	Fenway Park	9,264	22–15	L2
38	May 12	Athletics	1–4	Kaprielian (1–0)	Rodríguez (5–1)	Diekman (5)	Fenway Park	9,272	22–16	L3
39	May 13	Athletics	8–1	Richards (3–2)	Manaea (3–2)	Whitlock (1)	Fenway Park	9,301	23–16	W1
40	May 14	Angels	4–3	Andriese (2–2)	Watson (1–1)	Barnes (9)	Fenway Park	9,284	24–16	W2
41	May 15	Angels	9–0	Pérez (1–2)	Bundy (0–5)	—	Fenway Park	9,374	25–16	W3
42	May 16	Angels	5–6	Iglesias (2–2)	Barnes (1–1)	Mayers (2)	Fenway Park	9,316	25–17	L1
43	May 18	@ Blue Jays	0–8	Ryu (4–2)	Rodríguez (5–2)	—	TD Ballpark (Note: Due to COVID-19 restrictions in Canada, the Toronto Blue Jays scheduled home games through the end of May at their spring training facility, TD Ballpark in Dunedin, Florida, and home games for June and July at Sahlen Field, home ballpark of their Triple-A farm team in Buffalo, New York.)	1,566	25–18	L2
44	May 19	@ Blue Jays	7–3	Richards (4–2)	Stripling (0–3)	—	TD Ballpark	1,581	26–18	W1
45	May 20	@ Blue Jays	8–7	Valdéz (2–0)	Dolis (1–1)	Barnes (10)	TD Ballpark	1,562	27–18	W2
46	May 21	@ Phillies	11–3	Pérez (2–2)	Nola (3–4)	—	Citizens Bank Park	15,279	28–18	W3
47	May 22	@ Phillies	4–3	Eovaldi (5–2)	Howard (0–1)	Barnes (11)	Citizens Bank Park	15,424	29–18	W4
48	May 23	@ Phillies	2–6	Wheeler (4–2)	Rodríguez (5–3)	—	Citizens Bank Park	15,360	29–19	L1
49	May 25	Braves	1–3	Morton (3–2)	Richards (4–3)	Smith (8)	Fenway Park	9,357	29–20	L2
50	May 26	Braves	9–5	Pivetta (6–0)	Smyly (2–3)	—	Fenway Park	9,197	30–20	W1
51	May 28	Marlins	5–2 (6)	Pérez (3–2)	Poteet (2–1)	Ottavino (2)	Fenway Park	9,005	31–20	W2
52	May 29	Marlins	3–1	Eovaldi (6–2)	Rogers (6–3)	Barnes (12)	Fenway Park	25,089	32–20	W3
—	May 30	Marlins	Postponed (rain). Makeup date June 7.							
53	May 31	@ Astros	2–11	Urquidy (4–2)	Rodríguez (5–4)	—	Minute Maid Park	28,543	32–21	L1

June: 18–10 (Home: 10–4; Away: 8–6)

#	Date	Opponent	Score	Win	Loss	Save	Stadium	Attendance	Record	Box/ Streak
54	June 1	@ Astros	1–5	García (4–3)	Richards (4–4)	—	Minute Maid Park	23,449	32–22	L2
55	June 2	@ Astros	1–2	Valdez (1–0)	Pivetta (6–1)	Pressly (8)	Minute Maid Park	22,664	32–23	L3
56	June 3	@ Astros	5–1	Pérez (4–2)	Odorizzi (0–3)	—	Minute Maid Park	24,853	33–23	W1
57	June 4	@ Yankees	5–2	Eovaldi (7–2)	King (0–3)	Barnes (13)	Yankee Stadium	18,040	34–23	W2
58	June 5	@ Yankees	7–3	Whitlock (1–1)	Green (0–4)	Barnes (14)	Yankee Stadium	20,019	35–23	W3
59	June 6	@ Yankees	6–5 (10)	Barnes (2–1)	Cessa (1–1)	Valdéz (1)	Yankee Stadium	19,103	36–23	W4
60	June 7	Marlins	5–3	Sawamura (2–0)	Thompson (0–1)	Ottavino (3)	Fenway Park	25,374	37–23	W5
61	June 8	Astros	1–7	Valdez (2–0)	Pérez (4–3)	—	Fenway Park	23,604	37–24	L1
62	June 9	Astros	3–8	Odorizzi (1–3)	Eovaldi (7–3)	Javier (1)	Fenway Park	21,007	37–25	L2
63	June 10	Astros	12–8	Hernández (1–2)	Taylor (0–1)	—	Fenway Park	23,378	38–25	W1
64	June 11	Blue Jays	6–5	Whitlock (2–1)	Dolis (1–2)	—	Fenway Park	25,257	39–25	W2
65	June 12	Blue Jays	2–7	Matz (7–3)	Pivetta (6–2)	—	Fenway Park	24,024	39–26	L1
66	June 13	Blue Jays	4–18	Ray (4–2)	Pérez (4–4)	—	Fenway Park	22,595	39–27	L2
67	June 14	Blue Jays	2–1	Barnes (3–1)	Dolis (1–3)	—	Fenway Park	20,070	40–27	W1
68	June 15	@ Braves	10–8	Sawamura (3–0)	Martin (0–3)	Barnes (15)	Truist Park	36,638	41–27	W2
69	June 16	@ Braves	10–8	Ríos (1–0)	Greene (0–1)	Ottavino (4)	Truist Park	39,847	42–27	W3
70	June 18	@ Royals	3–5	Bubic (2–2)	Pivetta (6–3)	Holland (4)	Kauffman Stadium	29,870	42–28	L1
71	June 19	@ Royals	7–1	Pérez (5–4)	Keller (6–7)	—	Kauffman Stadium	24,568	43–28	W1
72	June 20	@ Royals	3–7	Minor (6–4)	Eovaldi (7–4)	—	Kauffman Stadium	20,726	43–29	L1
73	June 22	@ Rays	9–5 (11)	Hernández (2–2)	Fairbanks (1–3)	—	Tropicana Field	12,994	44–29	W1
74	June 23	@ Rays	2–8	Hill (6–2)	Richards (4–5)	—	Tropicana Field	9,088	44–30	L1
75	June 24	@ Rays	0–1	Feyereisen (4–3)	Barnes (3–2)	—	Tropicana Field	10,961	44–31	L2
76	June 25	Yankees	5–3	Whitlock (3–1)	Germán (4–5)	Barnes (16)	Fenway Park	36,869	45–31	W1
77	June 26	Yankees	4–2	Eovaldi (8–4)	Montgomery (3–2)	Ottavino (5)	Fenway Park	36,857	46–31	W2
78	June 27	Yankees	9–2	Rodríguez (6–4)	Cole (8–4)	—	Fenway Park	34,504	47–31	W3
79	June 28	Royals	6–5	Sawamura (4–0)	Staumont (0–2)	Barnes (17)	Fenway Park	22,766	48–31	W4
80	June 29	Royals	7–6	Ríos (2–0)	Brentz (2–1)	Barnes (18)	Fenway Park	25,180	49–31	W5
81	June 30	Royals	6–2	Pérez (6–4)	Minor (6–6)	—	Fenway Park	24,616	50–31	W6

July: 13–12 (Home: 7–5; Away: 6–7)

#	Date	Opponent	Score	Win	Loss	Save	Stadium	Attendance	Record	Box/ Streak
82	July 1	Royals	15–1	Eovaldi (9–4)	Bubic (2–4)	—	Fenway Park	27,913	51–31	W7
83	July 2	@ Athletics	3–2 (10)	Barnes (4–2)	Trivino (3–3)	Ottavino (6)	Oakland Coliseum	32,304	52–31	W8
84	July 3	@ Athletics	6–7 (12)	Wendelken (1–0)	Andriese (2–3)	—	Oakland Coliseum	16,297	52–32	L1
85	July 4	@ Athletics	1–0	Pivetta (7–3)	Kaprielian (4–3)	Barnes (19)	Oakland Coliseum	13,070	53–32	W1
86	July 5	@ Angels	5–4	Pérez (7–4)	Suárez (3–2)	Ottavino (7)	Angel Stadium	38,201	54–32	W2
87	July 6	@ Angels	3–5	Ohtani (4–1)	Eovaldi (9–5)	Iglesias (17)	Angel Stadium	28,689	54–33	L1
88	July 7	@ Angels	4–5	Heaney (5–6)	Rodríguez (6–5)	Iglesias (18)	Angel Stadium	20,001	54–34	L2
89	July 9	Phillies	11–5	Richards (5–5)	Velasquez (3–4)	—	Fenway Park	32,641	55–34	W1
90	July 10	Phillies	2–11	Falter (1–0)	Pérez (7–5)	—	Fenway Park	33,202	55–35	L1
91	July 11	Phillies	4–5	Sánchez (1–0)	Pivetta (7–4)	Suárez (2)	Fenway Park	32,586	55–36	L2
—	July 15	@ Yankees	Postponed (COVID-19). Makeup date August 17.							
92	July 16	@ Yankees	4–0	Rodríguez (7–5)	Montgomery (3–5)	Houck (1)	Yankee Stadium	40,130	56–36	W1
93	July 17	@ Yankees	1–3 (6)	Cole (10–4)	Sawamura (4–1)	—	Yankee Stadium	37,095	56–37	L1
94	July 18	@ Yankees	1–9	Taillon (5–4)	Pérez (7–6)	—	Yankee Stadium	40,309	56–38	L2
95	July 19	@ Blue Jays	13–4	Pivetta (8–4)	Stripling (3–6)	—	Sahlen Field	12,811	57–38	W1
—	July 20	@ Blue Jays	Postponed (Rain). Makeup date August 7.							
96	July 21	@ Blue Jays	7–4	Richards (6–5)	Ray (8–5)	Barnes (20)	Sahlen Field	14,607	58–38	W2
97	July 22	Yankees	5–4 (10)	Barnes (5–2)	Kriske (1–1)	—	Fenway Park	34,761	59–38	W3
98	July 23	Yankees	6–2	Ríos (3–0)	Cole (10–5)	—	Fenway Park	34,922	60–38	W4
99	July 24	Yankees	3–4	Taillon (6–4)	Ottavino (2–3)	Chapman (18)	Fenway Park	35,136	60–39	L1
100	July 25	Yankees	5–4	Workman (1–2)	Loáisiga (7–4)	Barnes (21)	Fenway Park	32,009	61–39	W1
101	July 26	Blue Jays	5–4	Ottavino (3–3)	Richards (4–1)	Barnes (22)	Fenway Park	27,142	62–39	W2
—	July 27	Blue Jays	Postponed (Rain). Makeup date July 28.							
102	July 28 (1)	Blue Jays	1–4 (7)	Ray (9–5)	Richards (6–6)	Romano (8)	Fenway Park	27,410	62–40	L1
103	July 28 (2)	Blue Jays	4–1 (7)	Whitlock (4–1)	Matz (8–6)	Barnes (23)	Fenway Park	27,783	63–40	W1
104	July 29	Blue Jays	1–13	Ryu (10–5)	Rodríguez (7–6)	—	Fenway Park	33,191	63–41	L1
105	July 30	@ Rays	3–7	Fleming (8–5)	Pérez (7–7)	—	Tropicana Field	11,109	63–42	L2
106	July 31	@ Rays	5–9	Kittredge (7–1)	Eovaldi (9–6)	—	Tropicana Field	20,521	63–43	L3

August: 12–16 (Home: 8–4; Away: 4–12)

#	Date	Opponent	Score	Win	Loss	Save	Stadium	Attendance	Record	Box/ Streak
107	August 1	@ Rays	2–3	McClanahan (5–4)	Pivetta (8–5)	Wisler (1)	Tropicana Field	17,816	63–44	L4
108	August 3	@ Tigers	2–4	Funkhouser (5–1)	Richards (6–7)	Soto (12)	Comerica Park	15,724	63–45	L5
109	August 4	@ Tigers	4–1	Rodríguez (8–6)	Mize (6–6)	Barnes (24)	Comerica Park	16,633	64–45	W1
110	August 5	@ Tigers	1–8	Skubal (7–10)	Pérez (7–8)	—	Comerica Park	19,144	64–46	L1
111	August 6	@ Blue Jays	4–12	Manoah (4–1)	Eovaldi (9–7)	—	Rogers Centre	14,719	64–47	L2
112	August 7 (1)	@ Blue Jays	0–1 (7)	Romano (5–1)	Barnes (5–3)	—	Rogers Centre	14,768	64–48	L3
113	August 7 (2)	@ Blue Jays	2–1 (8)	Barnes (6–3)	Cimber (2–3)	Ottavino (8)	Rogers Centre	12,659	65–48	W1
114	August 8	@ Blue Jays	8–9	Dolis (2–3)	Barnes (6–4)	Romano (10)	Rogers Centre	14,766	65–49	L1
115	August 10	Rays	4–8	Kittredge (8–1)	Barnes (6–5)	—	Fenway Park	25,356	65–50	L2
116	August 11	Rays	20–8	Eovaldi (10–7)	Fleming (9–6)	—	Fenway Park	30,286	66–50	W1
117	August 12	Rays	1–8	McHugh (4–1)	Houck (0–3)	—	Fenway Park	26,803	66–51	L1
118	August 13	Orioles	8–1	Pivetta (9–5)	Watkins (2–4)	Richards (1)	Fenway Park	28,022	67–51	W1
119	August 14	Orioles	16–2	Sale (1–0)	López (3–13)	—	Fenway Park	33,118	68–51	W2
120	August 15	Orioles	6–2	Rodríguez (9–6)	Akin (0–7)	—	Fenway Park	28,935	69–51	W3
121	August 17 (1)	@ Yankees	3–5 (7)	Abreu (2–0)	Whitlock (4–2)	Loaisiga (5)	Yankee Stadium	39,078	69–52	L1
122	August 17 (2)	@ Yankees	0–2 (7)	Peralta (4–2)	Eovaldi (10–8)	Green (5)	Yankee Stadium	35,237	69–53	L2
123	August 18	@ Yankees	2–5	Heaney (8–8)	Pivetta (9–6)	Luetge (1)	Yankee Stadium	39,166	69–54	L3
124	August 20	Rangers	6–0	Sale (2–0)	Dunning (5–8)	—	Fenway Park	30,012	70–54	W1
125	August 21	Rangers	1–10	Lyles (6–10)	Rodríguez (9–7)	—	Fenway Park	32,495	70–55	L1
—	August 22	Rangers	Postponed (rain, makeup August 23)							
126	August 23	Rangers	8–4 (11)	Whitlock (5–2)	Santana (2–3)	—	Fenway Park	27,652	71–55	W1
127	August 24	Twins	11–9	Taylor (1–0)	Jax (3–2)	Robles (11)	Fenway Park	27,986	72–55	W2
128	August 25	Twins	6–9 (10)	Colomé (4–4)	Robles (3–5)	—	Fenway Park	28,923	72–56	L1
129	August 26	Twins	12–2	Sale (3–0)	Gant (4–8)	—	Fenway Park	33,746	73–56	W1
130	August 27	@ Indians	4–3	Rodríguez (10–7)	Karinchak (7–4)	Ottavino (9)	Progressive Field	20,881	74–56	W2
131	August 28	@ Indians	5–3 (10)	Whitlock (6–2)	Wittgren (2–7)	Ottavino (10)	Progressive Field	26,221	75–56	W3
132	August 29	@ Indians	5–7	Shaw (6–6)	Davis (0–2)	Clase (19)	Progressive Field	22,883	75–57	L1
133	August 30	@ Rays	1–6	Patiño (4–3)	Pivetta (9–7)	—	Tropicana Field	6,753	75–58	L2
134	August 31	@ Rays	5–8	Yarbrough (8–4)	Peacock (0–1)	Kittredge (5)	Tropicana Field	6,868	75–59	L3

September: 14–11 (Home: 8–6; Away: 6–5)

#	Date	Opponent	Score	Win	Loss	Save	Stadium	Attendance	Record	Box/ Streak
135	September 1	@ Rays	3–2	Whitlock (7–2)	Fairbanks (3–5)	Ottavino (11)	Tropicana Field	7,808	76–59	W1
136	September 2	@ Rays	4–0	Rodríguez (11–7)	McClanahan (9–5)	Richards (2)	Tropicana Field	7,923	77–59	W2
137	September 3	Indians	8–5	Ottavino (4–3)	Quantrill (4–3)	Whitlock (2)	Fenway Park	31,127	78–59	W3
138	September 4	Indians	4–3	Ottavino (5–3)	Shaw (6–7)	—	Fenway Park	33,081	79–59	W4
139	September 5	Indians	5–11	Plesac (10–4)	Crawford (0–1)	Clase (21)	Fenway Park	27,578	79–60	L1
140	September 6	Rays	10–11 (10)	McHugh (6–1)	Whitlock (7–3)	—	Fenway Park	26,512	79–61	L2
141	September 7	Rays	7–12	Rasmussen (2–1)	Rodriguez (11–8)	—	Fenway Park	25,065	79–62	L3
142	September 8	Rays	2–1	Richards (7–7)	Chargois (5–1)	Robles (12)	Fenway Park	26,649	80–62	W1
143	September 10	@ White Sox	3–4	Rodón (12–5)	Houck (0–4)	Hendriks (34)	Guaranteed Rate Field	34,365	80–63	L1
144	September 11	@ White Sox	9–8 (10)	Whitlock (8–3)	Wright (0–1)	Taylor (1)	Guaranteed Rate Field	37,854	81–63	W1
145	September 12	@ White Sox	1–2	Kimbrel (4–4)	Whitlock (8–4)	—	Guaranteed Rate Field	36,178	81–64	L1
146	September 13	@ Mariners	4–5	Castillo (4–5)	Brasier (0–1)	Steckenrider (9)	T-Mobile Park	18,219	81–65	L2
147	September 14	@ Mariners	8–4	Ottavino (6–3)	Smith (2–4)	—	T-Mobile Park	19,887	82–65	W1
148	September 15	@ Mariners	9–4 (10)	Ottavino (7–3)	Swanson (0–3)	—	T-Mobile Park	17,860	83–65	W2
149	September 17	Orioles	7–1	Sale (4–0)	Akin (2–10)	—	Fenway Park	29,811	84–65	W3
150	September 18	Orioles	9–3	Houck (1–4)	Baumann (1–1)	—	Fenway Park	30,027	85–65	W4
151	September 19	Orioles	8–6	Sawamura (5–1)	Greene (1–1)	Richards (3)	Fenway Park	27,010	86–65	W5
152	September 21	Mets	6–3	Brasier (1–1)	Stroman (9–13)	—	Fenway Park	32,146	87–65	W6
153	September 22	Mets	12–5	Sale (5–0)	Walker (7–11)	—	Fenway Park	30,254	88–65	W7
154	September 24	Yankees	3–8	Cole (16–8)	Eovaldi (10–9)	—	Fenway Park	36,026	88–66	L1
155	September 25	Yankees	3–5	Severino (1–0)	Houck (1–5)	Chapman (29)	Fenway Park	36,103	88–67	L2
156	September 26	Yankees	3–6	Green (10–7)	Richards (7–8)	Chapman (30)	Fenway Park	36,312	88–68	L3
157	September 28	@ Orioles	2–4	Diplán (2–0)	Sale (5–1)	Sulser (8)	Camden Yards	8,098	88–69	L4
158	September 29	@ Orioles	6–0	Eovaldi (11–9)	Lowther (1–3)	—	Camden Yards	8,732	89–69	W1
159	September 30	@ Orioles	2–6	Wells (2–3)	Pivetta (9–8)	—	Camden Yards	13,012	89–70	L1

October: 3–0 (Home: 0–0; Away: 3–0)

#	Date	Opponent	Score	Win	Loss	Save	Stadium	Attendance	Record	Box/ Streak
160	October 1	@ Nationals	4–2	Rodríguez (12–8)	Rogers (2–2)	Robles (13)	Nationals Park	32,521	90–70	W1
161	October 2	@ Nationals	5–3	Davis (1–2)	Rainey (1–3)	Robles (14)	Nationals Park	41,465	91–70	W2
162	October 3	@ Nationals	7–5	Rodríguez (13–8)	Finnegan (5–9)	Pivetta (1)	Nationals Park	33,986	92–70	W3

== Player stats ==
=== Batting ===
Note: G = Games played; AB = At bats; R = Runs; H = Hits; 2B = Doubles; 3B = Triples; HR = Home runs; RBI = Runs batted in; SB = Stolen bases; BB = Walks; AVG = Batting average; SLG = Slugging average

Player	G	AB	R	H	2B	3B	HR	RBI	SB	BB	AVG	SLG
Rafael Devers	156	591	101	165	37	1	38	113	5	62	.279	.538
J. D. Martinez	148	570	92	163	42	3	28	99	0	55	.286	.518
Alex Verdugo	146	544	88	157	32	2	13	63	6	51	.289	.426
Xander Bogaerts	144	529	90	156	34	1	23	79	5	62	.295	.493
Hunter Renfroe	144	521	89	135	33	0	31	96	1	44	.259	.501
Enrique Hernández	134	508	84	127	35	3	20	60	1	61	.250	.449
Christian Vázquez	158	458	51	118	23	1	6	49	8	33	.258	.352
Bobby Dalbec	133	417	50	100	21	5	25	78	2	28	.240	.494
Marwin González	77	242	25	49	14	0	2	20	3	19	.202	.285
Christian Arroyo	57	164	22	43	12	0	6	25	1	8	.262	.445
Kevin Plawecki	64	157	15	45	7	0	3	15	0	12	.287	.389
Kyle Schwarber	41	134	34	39	10	0	7	18	0	33	.291	.522
Franchy Cordero	48	127	12	24	6	0	1	9	1	8	.189	.260
Danny Santana	38	116	15	21	2	1	5	14	4	10	.181	.345
Jarren Duran	33	107	17	23	3	2	2	10	2	4	.215	.336
Michael Chavis	31	79	12	15	4	1	2	6	1	1	.190	.342
Jonathan Araúz	28	65	9	12	3	0	3	8	0	8	.185	.369
José Iglesias	23	59	8	21	4	1	1	7	0	3	.356	.508
Travis Shaw	28	42	6	10	3	0	3	11	0	5	.238	.524
Jack López	7	13	2	2	2	0	0	0	0	1	.154	.308
Connor Wong	6	13	3	4	1	1	0	1	0	1	.308	.538
Yairo Muñoz	5	11	0	1	0	0	0	0	0	0	.091	.091
Taylor Motter	3	6	3	2	1	1	0	1	0	1	.333	.833
Pitcher totals	162	22	1	2	1	0	0	1	0	2	.091	.136
Team totals	162	5495	829	1434	330	23	219	783	40	512	.261	.449

=== Pitching ===
Note: W = Wins; L = Losses; ERA = Earned run average; G = Games pitched; GS = Games started; SV = Saves; IP = Innings pitched; H = Hits allowed; R = Runs allowed; ER = Earned runs allowed; BB = Walks allowed; SO = Strikeouts

Player	W	L	ERA	G	GS	SV	IP	H	R	ER	BB	SO
Nathan Eovaldi	11	9	3.75	32	32	0	182.1	182	81	76	35	195
Eduardo Rodríguez	13	8	4.74	32	31	0	157.2	172	87	83	47	185
Nick Pivetta	9	8	4.53	31	30	1	155.0	137	80	78	65	175
Garrett Richards	7	8	4.87	40	22	3	136.2	158	86	74	60	115
Martín Pérez	7	8	4.74	36	22	0	114.0	136	71	60	36	97
Garrett Whitlock	8	4	1.96	46	0	2	73.1	64	22	16	17	81
Tanner Houck	1	5	3.52	18	13	1	69.0	57	32	27	21	87
Adam Ottavino	7	3	4.21	69	0	11	62.0	55	31	29	35	71
Matt Barnes	6	5	3.79	60	0	24	54.2	41	25	23	20	84
Hirokazu Sawamura	5	1	3.06	55	0	0	53.0	45	24	18	32	61
Josh Taylor	1	0	3.40	61	0	1	47.2	45	18	18	23	60
Chris Sale	5	1	3.16	9	9	0	42.2	45	19	15	12	52
Darwinzon Hernández	2	2	3.38	48	0	0	40.0	29	17	15	31	54
Phillips Valdéz	2	0	5.85	28	0	1	40.0	35	29	26	19	35
Matt Andriese	2	3	6.03	26	0	1	37.1	55	29	25	11	38
Hansel Robles	0	1	3.60	27	0	4	25.0	21	11	10	13	33
Yacksel Ríos	3	0	3.70	20	0	0	24.1	13	10	10	14	21
Brandon Workman	1	0	4.95	19	0	0	20.0	24	11	11	14	14
Austin Davis	1	1	4.86	19	0	0	16.2	18	10	9	7	17
Austin Brice	0	0	6.59	13	0	0	13.2	14	10	10	7	12
Ryan Brasier	1	1	1.50	13	0	0	12.0	12	5	2	4	9
Ryan Weber	0	0	17.47	1	0	0	5.2	13	11	11	2	7
Brad Peacock	0	1	15.19	2	1	0	5.1	6	9	9	3	3
Michael Feliz	0	0	3.38	4	0	0	5.1	4	2	2	1	5
Stephen Gonsalves	0	0	4.15	3	0	0	4.1	2	2	2	2	4
Eduard Bazardo	0	0	0.00	2	0	0	3.0	1	0	0	2	3
Connor Seabold	0	0	6.00	1	1	0	3.0	3	2	2	2	0
John Schreiber	0	0	3.00	1	0	0	3.0	4	1	1	1	5
Brandon Brennan	0	0	0.00	1	0	0	3.0	3	0	0	2	1
Raynel Espinal	0	0	9.00	1	0	0	2.0	2	2	2	1	0
Kutter Crawford	0	1	22.50	1	1	0	2.0	5	5	5	2	2
Jonathan Araúz	0	0	9.00	1	0	0	1.0	2	1	1	0	0
Colten Brewer	0	0	36.00	1	0	0	1.0	4	4	4	3	1
Christian Arroyo	0	0	0.00	1	0	0	1.0	1	2	0	1	0
Marwin González	0	0	0.00	1	0	0	1.0	0	0	0	0	0
Kevin Plawecki	0	0	0.00	1	0	0	1.0	0	0	0	0	0
Kaleb Ort	0	0	0.00	1	0	0	0.1	1	0	0	1	0
Team totals	92	70	4.26	162	162	49	1419.0	1409	749	671	546	1527

=== Postseason game log ===
Boston Red Sox 2021 Postseason Game Log (6–5)
American League Wild Card Game vs. New York Yankees (1–0)

#/	Date	Opponent	Score	Win	Loss	Save	Stadium	Attendance	Series	Box/ Streak
1	October 5	Yankees	6−2	Eovaldi (1−0)	Cole (0−1)	—	Fenway Park	38,324	1–0	W1

American League Division Series vs. Tampa Bay Rays (3–1)

#/	Date	Opponent	Score	Win	Loss	Save	Stadium	Attendance	Series	Box/ Streak
1	October 7	@ Rays	0–5	McClanahan (1−0)	Rodríguez (0−1)	—	Tropicana Field	27,419	0–1	L1
2	October 8	@ Rays	14–6	Houck (1−0)	McHugh (0−1)	—	Tropicana Field	37,616	1–1	W1
3	October 10	Rays	6–4 (13)	Pivetta (1−0)	Patiño (0−1)	—	Fenway Park	37,224	2–1	W2
4	October 11	Rays	6–5	Whitlock (1−0)	Feyereisen (0−1)	—	Fenway Park	38,447	3–1	W3

American League Championship Series vs. Houston Astros (2–4)

#/	Date	Opponent	Score	Win	Loss	Save	Stadium	Attendance	Series	Box/ Streak
1	October 15	@ Astros	4–5	Stanek (1–0)	Robles (0–1)	Pressly (1)	Minute Maid Park	40,534	0–1	L1
2	October 16	@ Astros	9–5	Eovaldi (1−0)	García (0–1)	—	Minute Maid Park	41,476	1–1	W1
3	October 18	Astros	12–3	Rodríguez (1−0)	Urquidy (0–1)	—	Fenway Park	37,603	2–1	W2
4	October 19	Astros	2–9	Graveman (1–0)	Eovaldi (1−1)	—	Fenway Park	38,010	2–2	L1
5	October 20	Astros	1–9	Valdez (1–0)	Sale (0–1)	—	Fenway Park	37,599	2–3	L2
6	October 22	@ Astros	0–5	García (1–1)	Eovaldi (1−2)	—	Minute Maid Park	42,718	2–4	L3

=== Grand slams ===
No.	Date	Red Sox batter	H/A	Pitcher	Opposing team	Ref.
1	June 16	Christian Arroyo	Away	A. J. Minter	Atlanta Braves	
2	July 19	Hunter Renfroe	Away	Ross Stripling	Toronto Blue Jays	
3	August 23	Travis Shaw	Home	Dennis Santana	Texas Rangers	
4	October 16†	J. D. Martinez	Away	Luis García	Houston Astros	
5	October 16†	Rafael Devers	Away	Jake Odorizzi	Houston Astros	
6	October 18†	Kyle Schwarber	Home	José Urquidy	Houston Astros	

† Postseason game

=== Ejections ===
No.	Date	Red Sox personnel	H/A	Opposing team	Ref.
1	April 15	Alex Cora	Away	Minnesota Twins	
2	June 3	Alex Cora	Away	Houston Astros	
3	June 19	Christian Arroyo	Away	Kansas City Royals	
4	July 17	Will Venable	Away	New York Yankees	
5	July 17	Kevin Plawecki	Away	New York Yankees	

== Roster ==
2021 Boston Red Sox
Roster
Pitchers: 35 Matt Andriese; 32 Matt Barnes; 83 Eduard Bazardo; 70 Ryan Brasier; 66 Brandon Brennan; 48 Colten Brewer; 31 Austin Brice; 79 Kutter Crawford; 65 Austin Davis; 17 Nathan Eovaldi; 80 Raynel Espinal; 48 Michael Feliz; 78 Stephen Gonsalves; 63 Darwinzon Hernández; 89 Tanner Houck; 85 Kaleb Ort; 0 Adam Ottavino; 44 Brad Peacock; 54 Martín Pérez; 37 Nick Pivetta; 43 Garrett Richards; 75 Yacksel Ríos; 56 Hansel Robles; 57 Eduardo Rodríguez; 41 Chris Sale; 19 Hirokazu Sawamura; 46 John Schreiber; 67 Connor Seabold; 38 Josh Taylor; 71 Phillips Valdéz; 65 Ryan Weber; 72 Garrett Whitlock; 44 Brandon Workman	Catchers: 25 Kevin Plawecki; 7 Christian Vázquez; 74 Connor Wong; Infielders: 3 Jonathan Araúz; 39 Christian Arroyo; 2 Xander Bogaerts; 23 Michael Chavis; 29 Bobby Dalbec; 11 Rafael Devers; 12 Marwin González; 12 José Iglesias; 61 Jack López; 30 Taylor Motter; 60 Yairo Muñoz; 23 Travis Shaw	Outfielders: 16 Franchy Cordero; 40 Jarren Duran; 5 Kiké Hernández; 28 J. D. Martinez; 10 Hunter Renfroe; 22 Danny Santana; 18 Kyle Schwarber; 99 Alex Verdugo	Manager: 13 Alex Cora; Coaches: -- Michael Brenly (bullpen catcher); 58 Dave Bush (pitching); 62 Peter Fatse (assistant hitting); 52 Carlos Febles (third base); 82 Tom Goodwin (first base); 51 Tim Hyers (hitting); 88 Mani Martinez (bullpen catcher); 33 Jason Varitek (game planning); 84 Ramón Vázquez (quality control/interim first base); 86 Will Venable (bench); 55 Kevin Walker (bullpen)

=== MLB debuts ===
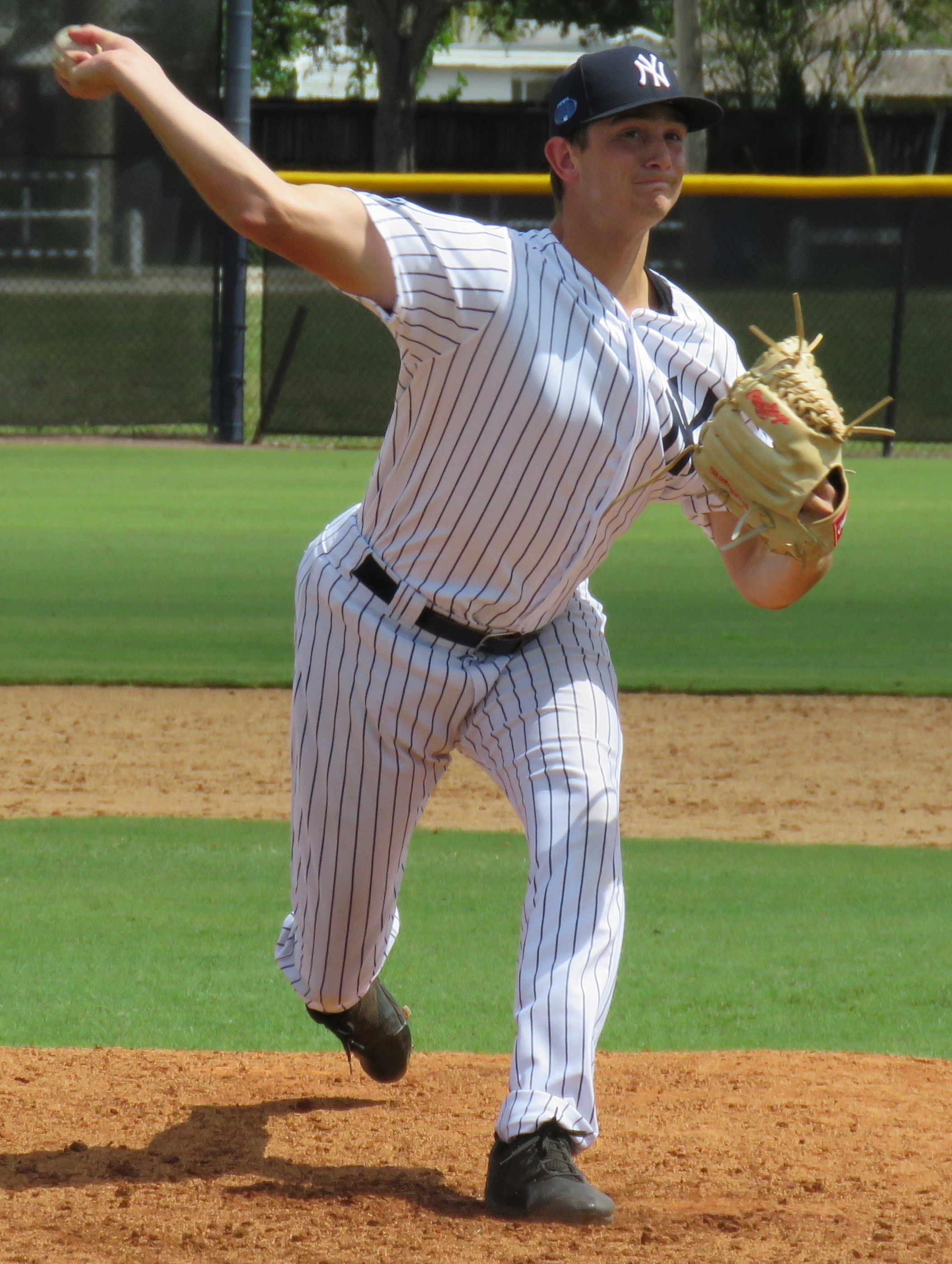
Garrett Whitlock during his time in the New York Yankees organization

Red Sox players who made their MLB debuts during the 2021 regular season:

- April 2: Hirokazu Sawamura
- April 4: Garrett Whitlock
- April 14: Eduard Bazardo
- June 22: Connor Wong
- July 17: Jarren Duran
- August 30: Raynel Espinal
- September 1: Jack López
- September 5: Kutter Crawford
- September 11: Connor Seabold
- September 13: Kaleb Ort

=== Transactions ===
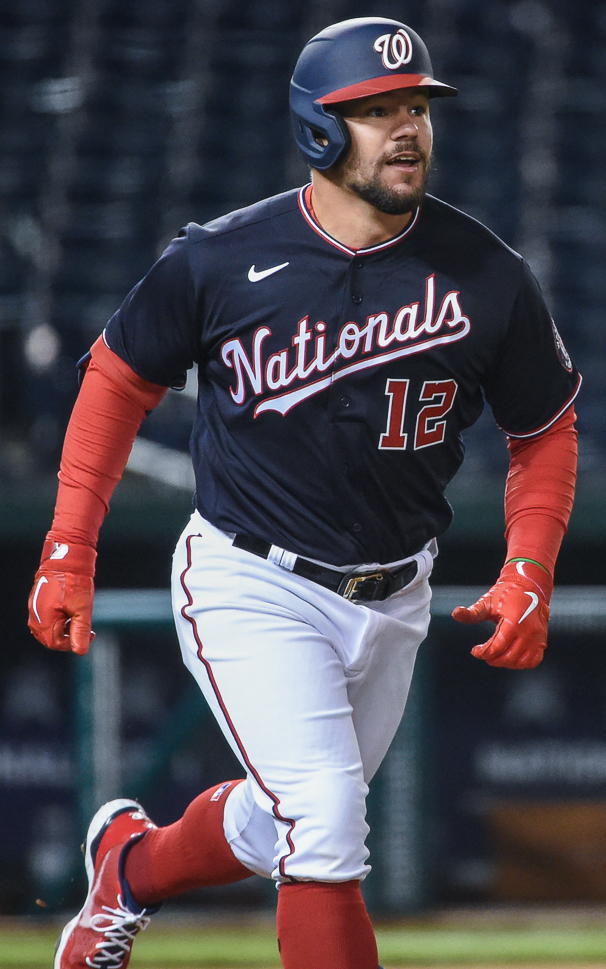
Kyle Schwarber in 2021 before joining the Red Sox

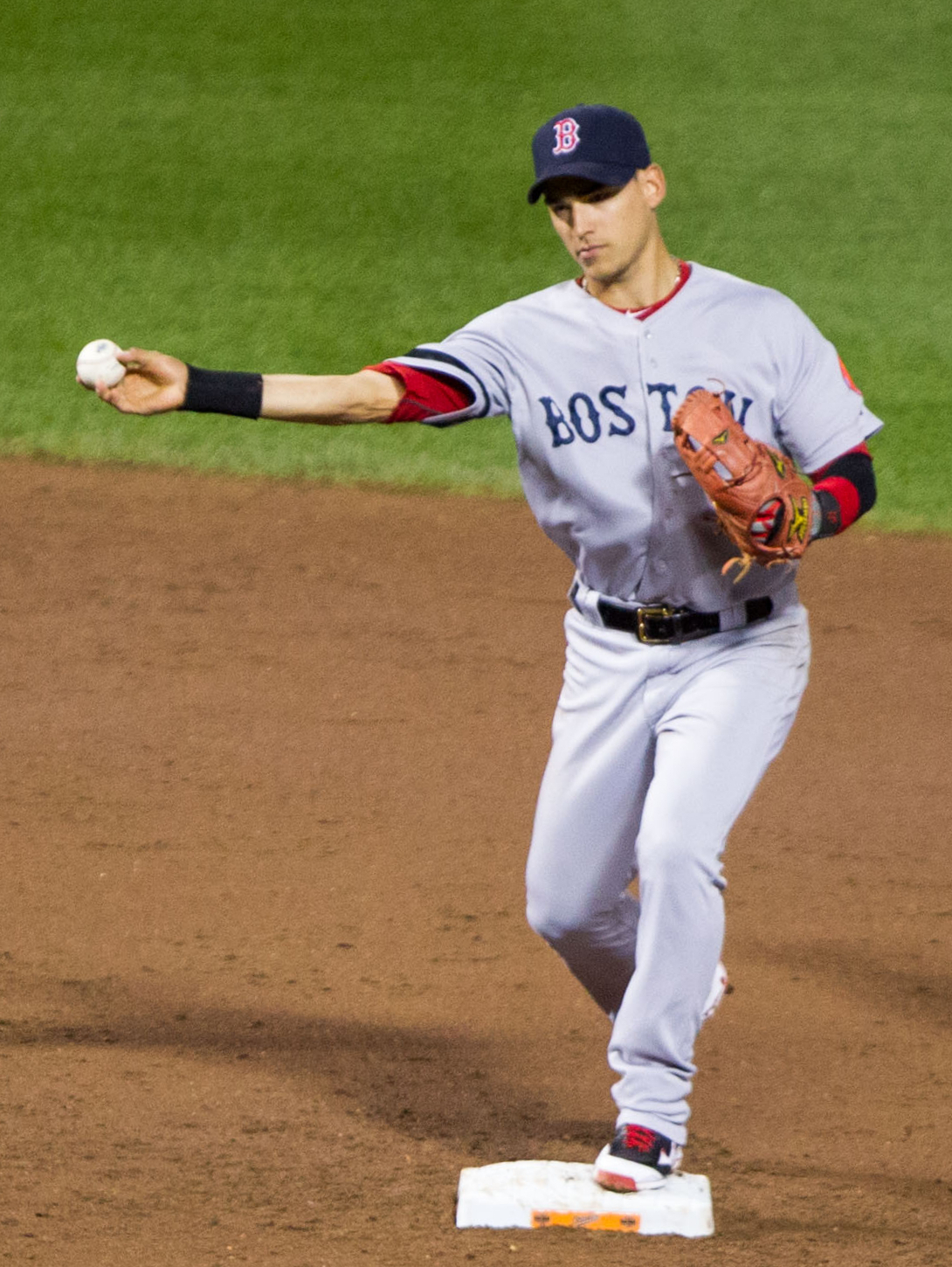
José Iglesias with the Red Sox in 2012

Notable transactions of/for players on the 40-man roster during the 2021 regular season:

- On May 3, the team claimed pitcher Brandon Brennan off of waivers from the Seattle Mariners; Ryan Brasier was moved to the 60-day injured list.
- On May 21, the team added utility player Danny Santana to the 40-man roster and activated him; Austin Brice was designated for assignment.
- On June 3, the team added reliever Brandon Workman to the 40-man roster and activated him; Colten Brewer was designated for assignment.
- On June 14, the team acquired pitcher Yacksel Ríos from the Seattle Mariners for cash; Ryan Weber was designated for assignment. Weber was later claimed off of waivers by the Milwaukee Brewers.
- On July 16, the team promoted Jarren Duran from Triple-A to the active roster; Brice was again designated for assignment.
- On July 29, the team acquired outfielder Kyle Schwarber from the Washington Nationals in exchange for minor-league pitcher Aldo Ramirez; Workman was designated for assignment. Workman subsequently elected to become a free agent.
- On July 30, the day of the trade deadline, the team acquired two relief pitchers: Austin Davis from the Pittsburgh Pirates in exchange for Michael Chavis, and Hansel Robles from the Minnesota Twins for minor-league pitcher Alex Scherff, with minor-league outfielder Marcus Wilson designated for assignment in a corresponding move. Wilson was later claimed off of waivers by the Mariners.
- On August 13, the team activated Schwarber and designated Marwin González for assignment; González was released three days later.
- On August 15, the team claimed infielder Travis Shaw off of waivers from the Brewers.
- On August 17, reliever Matt Andriese was designated for assignment; he was released two days later.

Note: players not in the organization as of August 31 were ineligible for the postseason.

- On September 2, the team claimed utility player Taylor Motter off of waivers from the Colorado Rockies. He appeared in three games with the team, then was designated for assignment on September 7. He cleared waivers and was sent outright to Triple-A.
- On September 4, the team claimed pitcher Geoff Hartlieb off of waivers from the New York Mets. He was later designated for assignment, then sent outright to Triple-A Worcester after clearing waivers.
- On September 6, the team signed free agent infielder José Iglesias, who had previously played with the team during 2011–2013 and had been released on September 3 by the Los Angeles Angels.
- On October 21, the team designated outfielder Franchy Cordero for assignment; he cleared waivers and was sent outright to Triple-A four days later.

=== Amateur draft ===
Boston had the fourth overall selection in the 2021 MLB draft, held July 11–13. The draft consisted of a total of 612 selections over 20 rounds. The Red Sox' first 10 selections are listed here. The deadline for the team to sign drafted players was August 1.

Round	Pick	Player	Position	B/T	Class	School (sorts by state)	Signing date
1	4	Marcelo Mayer	SS	L/R	HS Sr.	Eastlake High School (CA)	July 22
2	40	Jud Fabian	OF	R/L	4YR Jr.	Florida	did not sign
3	75	Tyler McDonough	2B	S/R	4YR Jr.	NC State	July 22
4	105	Elmer Rodriguez-Cruz	P	L/R	HS Sr.	Leadership Christian Academy (PR)	July 24
5	136	Nathan Hickey	C	L/R	4YR So.	Florida	August 1
6	166	Daniel McElveny	UT	R/R	HS Sr.	Bonita Vista High School (CA)	July 24
7	196	Wyatt Olds	P	R/R	4YR Jr.	Oklahoma	July 24
8	226	Hunter Dobbins	P	R/R	4YR Jr.	Texas Tech	July 24
9	256	Tyler Miller	3B	L/R	4YR Jr.	Auburn	July 24
10	286	Matt Litwicki	P	R/R	4YR Sr.	Indiana	July 15

== Awards and honors ==
Recipient	Award	Date awarded	Ref.
J. D. Martinez	AL Player of the Week (April 5–11)	April 12, 2021	
Matt Barnes	AL Reliever of the Month (April)	May 3, 2021	
Xander Bogaerts	All-Star Starting SS	July 1, 2021	
Rafael Devers	All-Star Starting 3B	July 1, 2021	
Matt Barnes	All-Star Relief P	July 4, 2021	
Nathan Eovaldi	All-Star Reserve P	July 4, 2021	
J. D. Martinez	All-Star Reserve DH	July 4, 2021	
Enrique Hernández	AL Player of the Week (July 19–25)	July 26, 2021	
Bobby Dalbec	AL Rookie of the Month (August)	September 2, 2021	
Xander Bogaerts	AL Silver Slugger Award SS	November 11, 2021	
Rafael Devers	AL Silver Slugger Award 3B	November 11, 2021	
Rafael Devers	All-MLB Team 3B (second team)	November 23, 2021	

Hunter Renfroe was a finalist for both a Silver Slugger Award and a Gold Glove Award.

Devers, Bogaerts, and Eovaldi each received votes in American League MVP balloting, finishing in 11th, 13th, and 15th place, respectively.

Eovaldi finished in fourth place in American League Cy Young Award balloting.

== Farm system ==
Entering the 2021 season, the Red Sox' farm system underwent multiple changes:

- The Worcester Red Sox succeeded the Pawtucket Red Sox as the Triple-A affiliate.
- The Lowell Spinners were dropped as an affiliate, as part of a reduction of the total number of minor league teams affiliated with MLB.
- The Greenville Drive and Salem Red Sox swapped relative classification levels, with Greenville moving from Single-A to High-A, and Salem moving from Class A-Advanced to Low-A.

Additionally, as part of the MLB reorganization of the minor leagues, the composition and names of various leagues were changed.

Managers were named in late January.

For the All-Star Futures Game, held on the Sunday before the All-Star Game, Boston had two players selected for the American League squad, infielder Jeter Downs (Triple-A) and pitcher Brayan Bello (Double-A).

In baseball at the Summer Olympics, contested during July and August in Tokyo, several minor-league Red Sox players won medals: Triston Casas and Jack López were on the US team that won silver, while Denyi Reyes, Roldani Baldwin, and Johan Mieses were on the Dominican team that won bronze. Darren Fenster, the Red Sox' minor-league outfield and baserunning coordinator, served as third base coach for the US team.

Level	Team	League	Division	Manager	Record	Notes
Triple-A	Worcester Red Sox	Triple-A East	Northeast	Billy McMillon	66–52 (.559); 8–2 (.800); 74–54 (.578)	Base: 3rd of 6 in division, 7th of 20 in league "Final Stretch": 3rd of 30 in classification Overall: 3rd of 6 in division, 4th of 20 in league
Double-A	Portland Sea Dogs	Double-A Northeast	Northeast	Corey Wimberly	67–47 (.588)	2nd of 6 in division; 4th of 12 in league
High-A	Greenville Drive	High-A East	South	Iggy Suarez	67–53 (.558)	3rd of 7 in division; 4th of 12 in league
Low-A	Salem Red Sox	Low-A East	North	Luke Montz	71–49 (.592)	1st of 4 in division; 3rd of 12 in league
Rookie	FCL Red Sox	Florida Complex League	South	Tom Kotchman	37–20 (.649)	2nd of 8 in division; 5th of 18 in league
Rookie	DSL Red Sox Blue	Dominican; Summer League	North	Ozzie Chavez	38–20 (.655)	1st of 8 in division; 3rd of 46 in league
Rookie	DSL Red Sox Red	Dominican; Summer League	Northwest	Sandy Madera	31–27 (.534)	4th of 8 in division; 17th of 46 in league
