= Bobby Poyner =

American baseball player (born 1992)

- Pitcher
- Born: December 1, 1992 (age 33); West Palm Beach, Florida, U.S.
- Batted: Left Threw: Left

MLB debut
- March 31, 2018, for the Boston Red Sox

Last MLB appearance
- September 28, 2019, for the Boston Red Sox

MLB statistics
- Win–loss record: 1–1
- Earned run average: 4.50
- Strikeouts: 35
- Stats at Baseball Reference

Teams
- Boston Red Sox (2018–2019)

Robert William Poyner (born December 1, 1992) is a former American professional baseball pitcher. He throws and bats left-handed, and is listed at 6 feet 0 inches (1.83 m) and 205 pounds (93 kg). He played in Major League Baseball (MLB) for two seasons for the Boston Red Sox.

== Early years ==
Poyner attended Palm Beach Central High School in Wellington, Florida. He played for the school's baseball team, but suffered a torn labrum in 2011, his senior year. He enrolled at the University of Florida and played college baseball for the Florida Gators from 2012 through 2015. While at Florida, he pursued a degree in finance. In 2013 and 2014, he played collegiate summer baseball with the Orleans Firebirds of the Cape Cod Baseball League.

== Professional career ==
The Boston Red Sox selected Poyner in the 14th round, with the 411th overall selection, of the 2015 MLB draft. After he signed, he made his professional debut with the Lowell Spinners of the Low–A New York-Penn League, and spent the whole season there, pitching to a 1–2 record and 2.28 ERA in 17 relief appearances.

Poyner began the 2016 season with the Greenville Drive of the Single–A South Atlantic League, and was promoted in June to the Salem Red Sox of the High–A Carolina League. In 65 2/3 innings pitched between the two teams, he compiled a 3–1 record and 3.15 ERA.

In 2017, Poyner started the season with Salem, and was promoted to the Portland Sea Dogs of the Double-A Eastern League. He posted a combined 2–1 record, 1.49 ERA, and 0.93 WHIP with 84 strikeouts in 60 1/3 total innings pitched between the two teams. After the regular season, he pitched in the Arizona Fall League.

2018

In 2018, the Red Sox invited Poyner to spring training as a non-roster player to compete for a major league role; he was named to Boston's Opening Day roster. Poyner made his MLB debut on March 31, pitching 2/3 of an inning against the Tampa Bay Rays while allowing one hit, a home run by Carlos Gómez. Poyner recorded his first major league win on April 5, pitching two innings of scoreless relief, again against Tampa Bay. On April 12, Poyner was placed on the 10-day disabled list, due to a left hamstring strain; he was subsequently sent to Double-A Portland and the Triple-A Pawtucket Red Sox on rehabilitation assignments, and then optioned to Pawtucket. He was recalled to Boston on May 4, pitched one inning that day against the Texas Rangers, and optioned back to Pawtucket the next day. Poyner was recalled to Boston on May 15, made two appearances, and sent back to Triple-A on May 24. On June 2, Poyner was recalled to Boston, made one appearance, and returned to Pawtucket on June 7. He was again recalled to Boston on July 14, but did not make an appearance before being returned to Triple-A on July 21. Poyner was called up to Boston on September 1, when rosters expanded. He finished the season with a 1–0 record in 20 appearances with Boston, recording a 3.22 ERA and 24 strikeouts in 22 1/3 innings. Poyner was not included on Boston's postseason roster, as the team went on to win the World Series over the Los Angeles Dodgers.

2019

In 2019, Poyner was optioned to Triple-A Pawtucket prior to Opening Day. He was recalled to Boston on April 20, when Nathan Eovaldi went on the injured list, and optioned back to Pawtucket after the first game of a doubleheader on April 23. Poyner was later recalled to Boston on June 10, and optioned back to Pawtucket two days later. He was recalled to Boston on September 4, following the end of the Triple-A season. Overall with the 2019 Red Sox, Poyner appeared in 13 games (one start), compiling an 0–1 record with 6.94 ERA and 11 strikeouts in 11 2/3 innings.

2020

On January 15, 2020, Poyner was designated for assignment by the Red Sox. Six days later, he was assigned outright to Triple-A Pawtucket. Prior to the delayed start of the 2020 season, Poyner was added to Boston's alternate player pool on July 17, and was removed from the alternate player pool on July 21. Poyner did not play in a game in 2020 due to the cancellation of the minor league season because of the COVID-19 pandemic.

2021

Poyner was assigned to the Triple-A Worcester Red Sox to begin the 2021 season. After recording a 9.69 ERA across 8 appearances in Worcester, Poyner was released by the Red Sox organization on July 5, 2021.
