= 2019 Boston Red Sox season =

Major League Baseball season

2019 Boston Red Sox
- League: American League
- Division: East
- Ballpark: Fenway Park
- City: Boston, Massachusetts
- Record: 84–78 (.519)
- Divisional place: 3rd
- Owners: John W. Henry (Fenway Sports Group)
- President: Sam Kennedy
- President of baseball operations: Dave Dombrowski (until Sept. 9); Acting (from Sept. 9): Brian O'Halloran, Eddie Romero, Zack Scott, Raquel Ferreira
- General manager: none (de facto by President of Baseball Operations)
- Manager: Alex Cora
- Television: NESN: Dave O'Brien or Mike Monaco (play-by-play); Jerry Remy, Dennis Eckersley, Carlos Peña, Jarrod Saltalamacchia (color); Tom Caron (studio)
- Radio: WEEI-FM, Boston Red Sox Radio Network: Joe Castiglione & rotation of partners
- Stats: ESPN.com; Baseball Reference

The 2019 Boston Red Sox season was the 119th season in the team's history, and their 108th season at Fenway Park. The Red Sox entered the season as reigning World Series champions, but did not repeat, as they were eliminated from playoff contention on September 20. With a record of 84 wins and 78 losses, they finished third in the American League East, 19 games behind the New York Yankees. It was the first time the Red Sox did not win their division since 2015. Average attendance at home games was 35,994.

== Offseason ==
During the offseason, the team retained or re-signed most players from the 2018 team. Not retained were closer Craig Kimbrel, reliever Joe Kelly, starter Drew Pomeranz, and second baseman Ian Kinsler. Prior to Opening Day, the team sent catcher Sandy León to the minor leagues, opting to carry two catchers on the roster, Christian Vázquez and Blake Swihart. Manager Alex Cora stated he would use Andrew Benintendi as the team's leadoff hitter, with Mookie Betts batting second, swapping their positions from the team's usual 2018 batting order. Cora did not name a specific relief pitcher as closer.

October–December 2018

=== October ===
- On October 30, the Red Sox exercised their $15M 2019 team option on LHP Chris Sale.
- On October 31, LHP David Price announced that he would return to the Red Sox for the 2019 season, declining a contract option that would have allowed him to become a free agent.

=== November ===
- On November 12, closer Craig Kimbrel declined Boston's one-year, $17.9 million qualifying offer, thus becoming a free agent.
- On November 15, the Red Sox announced an average price increase of 2.5 percent for tickets to 2019 games.
- On November 16, the Red Sox re-signed 1B/LF Steve Pearce to a one-year, $6.25M deal.
- On November 20, the Padres traded RHP Colten Brewer to the Red Sox for infielder Esteban Quiroz. On the same day, the Red Sox released RHP William Cuevas, who then signed with the KT Wiz of Korea's KBO League.
- On November 28, senior vice president of player personnel Allard Baird was hired by the New York Mets.
- On November 30, the Red Sox re-signed RHP Tyler Thornburg to a one-year contract worth $1.75 million, plus incentives worth up to $400,000.

=== December ===
- On December 6, the Red Sox re-signed RHP Nathan Eovaldi to a four-year contract, reportedly worth $67.5 million.
- On December 10, the Cincinnati Reds claimed LHP Robby Scott off of waivers.
- On December 11, radio announcer Tim Neverett advised that he allowed his contract with WEEI-FM to run out and that he would no longer be part of the Red Sox radio broadcast team.
- On December 11, manager Alex Cora announced that Andrew Benintendi would be the team's leadoff hitter in 2019, with Mookie Betts batting second.
- On December 21, the Red Sox re-signed RHP Heath Hembree to a one-year, $1.3 million deal.
- On December 21, RHP Joe Kelly signed a three-year, $27 million contract with the Los Angeles Dodgers.

January–March 2019

=== January ===
- On January 10, multiple non-roster invitees to spring training were announced, including Rusney Castillo, Josh Ockimey, and Mike Shawaryn.
- On January 11, RHP Steven Wright agreed to a one-year contract with the Red Sox worth $1.375 million.
- On January 12, it was announced that the Red Sox reached agreement on one-year contracts with all of their remaining arbitration-eligible players, including Mookie Betts, Xander Bogaerts, Jackie Bradley Jr., and Brock Holt.
- On January 30, the team signed RHP Jenrry Mejía to a minor league contract. Mejía was reinstated after spending three years out of baseball due to a permanent suspension for three failed drug tests.
- On January 31, pitcher David Price announced that he was changing his uniform number from 24 to 10.

=== February ===
- "Truck Day"—when equipment for spring training leaves Fenway Park—was February 4.
- On February 13, spring training began for pitchers and catchers.
- On February 14, Entercom and WEEI-FM announced that a rotation of commentators would be used to replace Tim Neverett in Red Sox radio broadcasts with Joe Castiglione; included in the announcement were Sean McDonough, Chris Berman, and former Detroit Tigers announcer Mario Impemba.
- On February 18, the team held its first full-squad workout.
- On February 20, New England Sports Network (NESN) announced that Dennis Eckersley and Jerry Remy would be the usual color commentators for television broadcasts with Dave O'Brien, including 30 games with a three-man booth. For games when Eckersley and Remy are not available, former Red Sox players Carlos Peña and Jarrod Saltalamacchia would fill in. Tom Caron continues as studio host of pregame and postgame shows, working with several other former players, including Jim Rice and Steve Lyons.
- On February 21, baseball writer Nick Cafardo of The Boston Globe died at JetBlue Park, reportedly of an embolism.
- On February 22, the Red Sox defeated the Northeastern Huskies, 6–0, in a seven inning exhibition game.
- On February 23, Grapefruit League play started with an 8–5 win over the New York Yankees.

=== March ===
- On March 2, the team announced that it had reached agreement with 17 players, including Andrew Benintendi and Rafael Devers, for one-year deals, resulting in all players on the major league roster being under contract for the season.
- On March 6, MLB suspended RHP Steven Wright for 80 games, due to a positive test for a performance-enhancing substance, Growth Hormone Releasing Peptide 2 (GHRP-2).
- On March 17, manager Alex Cora named Chris Sale as the starting pitcher for Opening Day.
- On March 18, Cora announced that second baseman Dustin Pedroia would begin the season on the injured list.
- On March 23, the Red Sox completed their spring training games in Florida with a record of 12–15.
- On March 25 and 26, Boston played their final two spring training games in Mesa, Arizona, against the Chicago Cubs. The Cubs won both games, by scores of 3–2 and 16–7.
- On March 26, the Red Sox sent catcher Sandy León outright to Triple-A Pawtucket.
- On March 27, the team placed Dustin Pedroia, Steve Pearce, and Marco Hernández on the 10-day injured list, bringing the team's active roster size to 25, the MLB regular season limit.

== Regular season ==
Key dates:

- March 28: Season opener at Seattle Mariners.
- April 9: Home opener vs. Toronto Blue Jays.
- June 29–30: 2019 MLB London Series in England vs. New York Yankees
- July 8–11: All-Star break.
  - July 9: All-Star Game at Progressive Field in Cleveland.
- July 12–14: Home series vs. Los Angeles Dodgers, whom Boston defeated in the 2018 World Series.
- September 29: Final regular season game, vs. Baltimore Orioles at Fenway Park.

=== Opening Day, March 28 at Seattle Mariners ===
The 2019 regular season began on March 28 against the Seattle Mariners at T-Mobile Park (formerly known as Safeco Field). Manager Alex Cora named Chris Sale as Boston's Opening Day starting pitcher, and advised the starting lineup to the media on March 27. Seattle scored seven runs off of Sale, who only pitched three innings and took the loss. Mariners' shortstop Tim Beckham had two home runs en route to a 12–4 final score. Mookie Betts went 3-for-5 at the plate.

==== Opening Day lineup ====
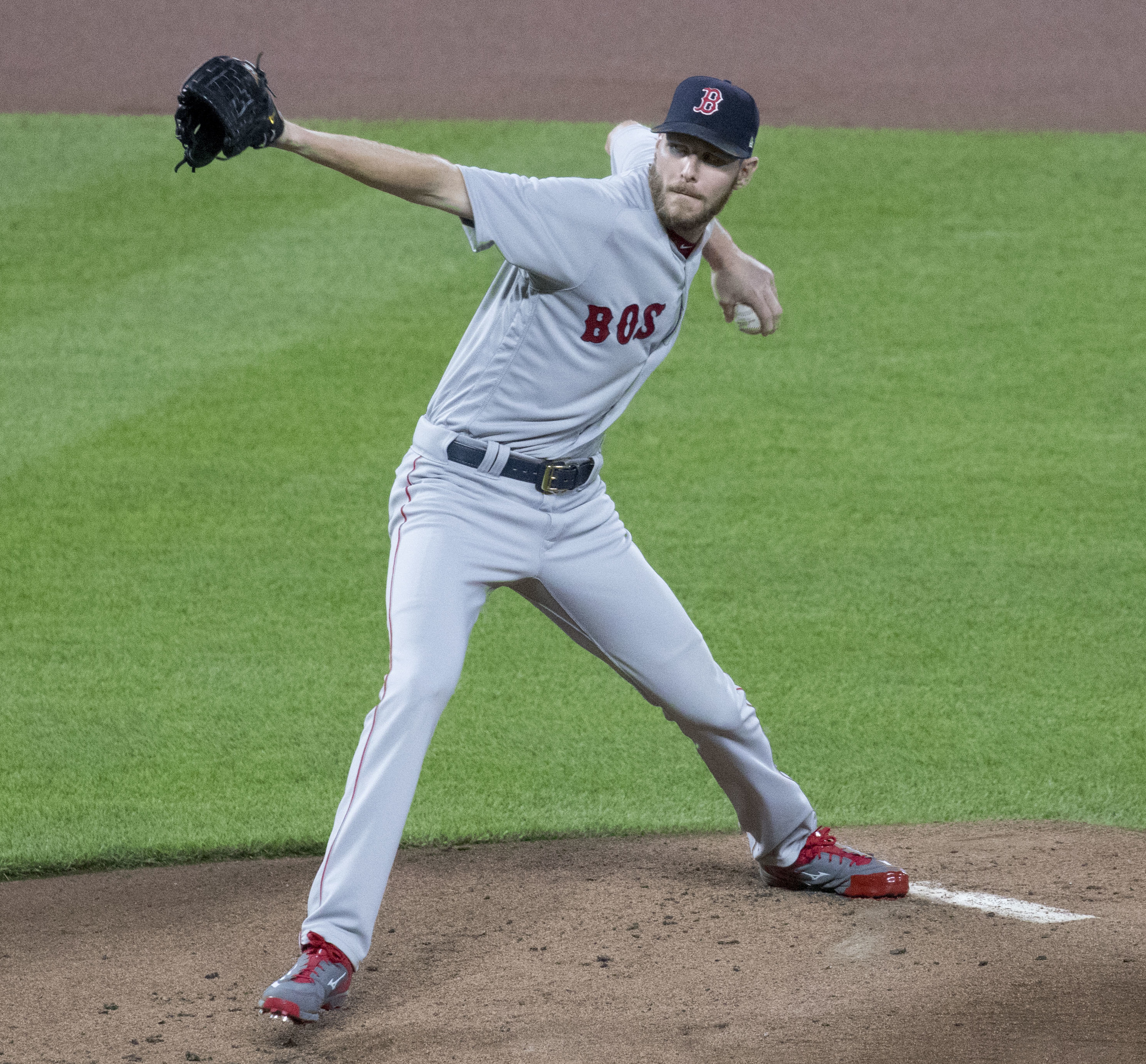
Opening Day starter Chris Sale

Order	No.	Player	Pos.
1	16	Andrew Benintendi	LF
2	50	Mookie Betts	RF
3	11	Rafael Devers	3B
4	28	J. D. Martinez	DH
5	2	Xander Bogaerts	SS
6	18	Mitch Moreland	1B
7	36	Eduardo Núñez	2B
8	19	Jackie Bradley Jr.	CF
9	7	Christian Vázquez	C
–	41	Chris Sale	P

March / April

=== March ===
March 28–March 31, at Seattle Mariners
After a 12–4 loss in the season opener, the Red Sox came from behind to win the second game of the season, 7–6. Brian Johnson got the win in relief, with Matt Barnes picking up the team's first save of the season. Mitch Moreland's three-run home run in the ninth inning provided the winning margin. A late Boston rally in the third game of the series came up a run short, as Seattle held on for a 6–5 win. Boston again rallied late in the fourth game, loading the bases with one out in the ninth, but fell two runs short, losing 10–8. During the series, only one Red Sox starting pitcher, Nathan Eovaldi in the second game, lasted five innings.

Red Sox lost the series 1–3 (24–34 runs)

=== April ===
April 1–April 4, at Oakland Athletics
The Red Sox were held scoreless in the first two games of the series, falling to the Athletics by scores of 7–0 and 1–0. It was Boston's first time being shutout back-to-back since their 2015 season. Each game featured an outfield assist by Oakland center fielder Ramón Laureano to retire Xander Bogaerts; at home in the first game, and at third base in the second game. The Red Sox ended their four-game losing streak with a 6–3 win in the third game of the series. Blake Swihart was 3-for-4 at the plate including a home run, while Ryan Brasier recorded his first major league save. In the final game of the series, J. D. Martinez hit his third home run of the season, but the Red Sox were unable to win consecutive games, losing 7–3. Boston's 2–6 start was the worst for a defending World Series champion since the 1998 Florida Marlins, who were 1–7 through eight games played.

Red Sox lost the series 1–3 (9–18 runs)

April 5–April 7, at Arizona Diamondbacks
Boston fell to Arizona in the Diamondbacks' home opener, 15–8, after falling behind 14–1 through six innings. Starter Rick Porcello allowed 10 hits and seven runs in 4 2/3 innings, followed by Brian Johnson who allowed six hits and seven runs in 1 1/3 innings. Late in the game, both Mookie Betts and Mitch Moreland homered, while infielder Eduardo Núñez pitched an inning in relief. The second game of the series was tied in the bottom of the ninth, when Betts threw out Eduardo Escobar at the plate as he attempted to score from second on a single to right. However, a two-out walk-off single by the next batter, catcher Carson Kelly, gave the Diamondbacks a 5–4 win. Starting pitcher David Price allowed four runs in six innings for a no decision, while going 1-for-2 at the plate with an RBI. The team's record through 10 games was their worst start since 2011, which also began 2–8. The Red Sox won the final game of the series, 1–0, with the only run coming on a Moreland home run. Five Boston pitchers combined to shutout the Diamondbacks. Two Boston relief pitchers (Marcus Walden and Matt Barnes) batted, the first time that had occurred since 1972.

Red Sox lost the series 1–2 (13–20 runs)

April 9 & April 11, vs. Toronto Blue Jays

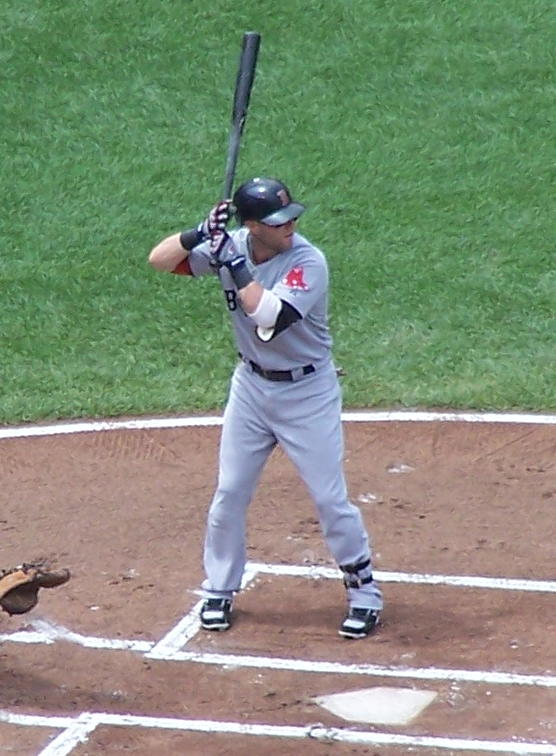
Dustin Pedroia made his 2019 debut with the Red Sox on April 9.

Prior to the home opener, the Red Sox celebrated their 2018 World Series victory, including raising a World Series banner and awarding World Series rings. In the game, Boston jumped out to an early 2–0 lead after two innings, only to fall behind 5–2 at the end of four, en route to a 7–5 defeat. Chris Sale gave up five runs in four innings for the loss, including a steal of home by Lourdes Gurriel Jr. For the Red Sox, Mookie Betts and Mitch Moreland both homered, while Dustin Pedroia was 1-for-4 in his first MLB game since May 2018. In the second game of this short series, Toronto led 5–3 after three innings and 6–5 after eight. In the ninth inning, a Betts walk followed by a Moreland double tied the game. Two subsequent walks (one intentional) loaded the bases, then Rafael Devers delivered a walk-off single, giving Boston a 7–6 win.

Red Sox tied the series 1–1 (12–13 runs)

April 12–April 15, vs. Baltimore Orioles
The opening game of the series was a 6–4 win for Boston, giving the team their first back-to-back wins of the season. Xander Bogaerts was 3-for-4 at the plate, while Andrew Benintendi hit his first home run of the year. Eduardo Rodríguez was the first Red Sox starting pitcher to record a win this season, while Ryan Brasier notched his third save. In the second game of the series, Red Sox starter Rick Porcello took the loss to fall to 0–3 on the season, as the Orioles won, 9–5. Christian Vázquez was the only Boston player with two hits, one of them a home run. Baltimore first baseman Chris Davis ended his streak of 54 consecutive at bats without a hit, going 3-for-5 with four RBIs. The third game of the series saw David Price hold the Orioles to three hits and no runs through seven innings, as the Red Sox won, 4–0. Benintendi had to leave the game shortly after fouling a pitch off of his right foot in the bottom of the third inning, while Bogaerts had three RBIs on an eighth inning home run. The closing game of the series was an 8–1 Orioles win on the day of the Boston Marathon, with the Red Sox using a total of six pitchers.

Red Sox tied the series 2–2 (16–21 runs)

April 16–April 17, at New York Yankees
The first game of the season between the longtime rivals was an 8–0 shutout by the Yankees, as Chris Sale took the loss to fall to 0–4 on the season. Boston's record fell to 6–12, the team's worst start since the 1996 Red Sox started 3–15. In the second game of this two-game series, Boston starter Nathan Eovaldi held New York to three hits and one run through six innings, with the Red Sox leading, 3–1. However, after the Yankees loaded the bases in the bottom of the seventh inning off of Red Sox reliever Brandon Workman, Brett Gardner hit a grand slam off of Ryan Brasier, giving New York a 5–3 lead and ultimately the win by that score. J. D. Martinez and Christian Vázquez homered for Boston, while Dustin Pedroia left the game in the middle of the second inning due to left knee discomfort. Boston's record of 6–13 was the worst for a defending World Series champion through 19 games since the 1998 Florida Marlins started 5–14. Boston's run differential of -42 set a new MLB-worst for a defending champion through 19 games, surpassing the -37 of the 1988 Minnesota Twins.

Red Sox lost the series 0–2 (3–13 runs)

April 19–April 21, at Tampa Bay Rays

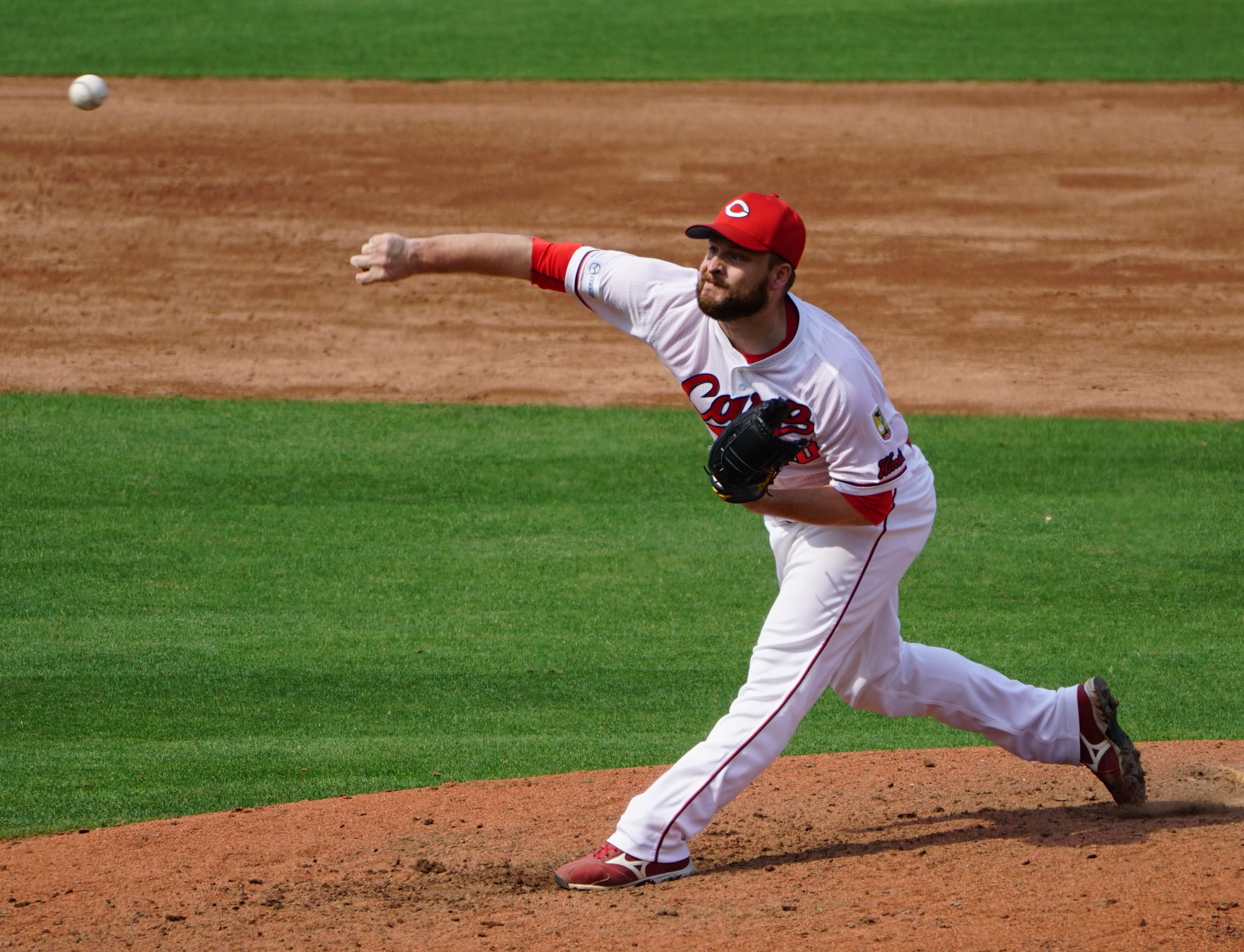
Ryan Brasier earned a save in each game of the April 19–21 series.

The opening game against the AL East leading Rays was a 6–4 Red Sox win. Tied 4–4 in the eighth inning, Mookie Betts and Mitch Moreland hit back-to-back home runs, and Ryan Brasier pitched a scoreless ninth inning for his fourth save of the season. In the second game of the series, the Red Sox jumped out to an early 5–0 lead, with four runs coming on a grand slam by Andrew Benintendi in the second inning. The Rays came back to tie the game, 5–5, through eight innings. Boston scored one run in the top of the ninth, helped in part by a pinch hit double by Michael Chavis in his first MLB at bat. Brasier closed out the game for his fifth save of the season, the final out coming when catcher Christian Vázquez threw to first base to pickoff Rays outfielder Tommy Pham. The final game of the series was Boston's first extra innings game of the season. The Red Sox had a 3–2 lead after seven innings, but the Rays tied it in the bottom of the eighth. After scoreless ninth and tenth innings, Boston scored in the top of the eleventh, on a sacrifice fly by Vázquez that scored Rafael Devers. Brasier then got his third save in three days, closing out the 4–3 win.

Red Sox won the series 3–0 (16–12 runs)

April 22–April 25, vs. Detroit Tigers
The April 22 game was postponed due to rain, resulting in a day-night doubleheader being scheduled for April 23. In the first game of a Tuesday doubleheader, the teams played to a 3–3 tie through seven innings, before the Tigers scored three runs off of Colten Brewer en route to a 7–4 win, ending the Red Sox' winning streak at three games. Xander Bogaerts had two home runs, as Boston was held to five hits total. In the second game of the doubleheader, the Tigers went ahead 3–0 in the fourth inning. Boston closed the lead to 3–2 entering the ninth, but Detroit got an insurance run before closer Shane Greene notched his 11th save of the season in the 4–2 Tigers' win. The Red Sox got a total of five innings of one-run relief from Darwinzon Hernández and Travis Lakins, both of whom made their MLB debuts. In the third game of the series, Boston held a 4–1 lead after six innings, then scored seven runs in the bottom of the eighth, en route to an 11–4 win. J. D. Martinez was 3-for-4 at the plate, while Eduardo Rodríguez held Detroit to one run in six innings and got the win. The series' final game was a 7–3 Boston win, with Rick Porcello getting his first win of the season, and Michael Chavis hitting his second MLB home run.

Red Sox tied the series 2–2 (24–18 runs)

April 26–April 28, vs. Tampa Bay Rays

The April 26 game was postponed due to rain, resulting in a day-night doubleheader being scheduled for June 8. In Saturday's game, Tampa Bay starter Charlie Morton held Boston to two hits and no runs through six innings, as the Rays went on to a 2–1 win. An eighth inning homer by Mookie Betts was the Red Sox' only run. In Sunday's game, Red Sox starter Chris Sale allowed two runs in each of the first two innings (two of the four runs were unearned), taking the loss in a 5–2 Rays win. Michael Chavis hit his third MLB home run.

Red Sox lost the series 0–2 (3–7 runs)

April 29–April 30, vs. Oakland Athletics

In the first game of a three-game series, Boston fell behind 4–0 after two innings, then rallied for six runs in the bottom of the third, en route to a 9–4 win. Mookie Betts was 3-for-4, while Michael Chavis had three RBIs. Ryan Brasier got the win in a seven-pitcher effort from the Boston staff. The second game of the series was a 5–1 Boston win, as starter Rick Porcello pitched eight scoreless innings for the win. Betts and Mitch Moreland each homered.

May

=== May ===
May 1, vs. Oakland Athletics (cont'd)
In the third and final game of the series, Boston starting pitcher Héctor Velázquez was removed after 43 pitches in two innings. The bullpen provided six runs of scoreless relief, as Boston built a 7–1 lead en route to a 7–3 win and series sweep. Mitch Moreland and Christian Vázquez each homered.

Red Sox won the series 3–0 (21–8 runs)

May 2–May 5, at Chicago White Sox

In the first game of a four-game series, the Red Sox took a 4–3 lead into the bottom of the ninth. A one-out error by third baseman Rafael Devers put a runner on first. A single then put runners at the corners, and Nicky Delmonico followed with a three-run walk-off home run off of Ryan Brasier, giving Chicago the win, 6–4. Chris Sale got his first win of the season in the second game of the series, a 6–1 Boston win, allowing no runs and three hits in six innings pitched. Devers and Michael Chavis each homered. The third game of the series was notable for the Red Sox scoring nine runs with two outs in the third inning; after the first two batters were retired, Boston had 10 hits in a row (four singles, three doubles, and three home runs). Chavis and Christian Vázquez each had four hits during the game, a 15–2 Boston win. The series' closing game was tied, 2–2, going into the eighth inning, when Boston scored seven runs. Four runs came on a grand slam by Xander Bogaerts, as the Red Sox won, 9–2.

Red Sox won the series 3–1 (34–11 runs)

May 6–May 8, at Baltimore Orioles

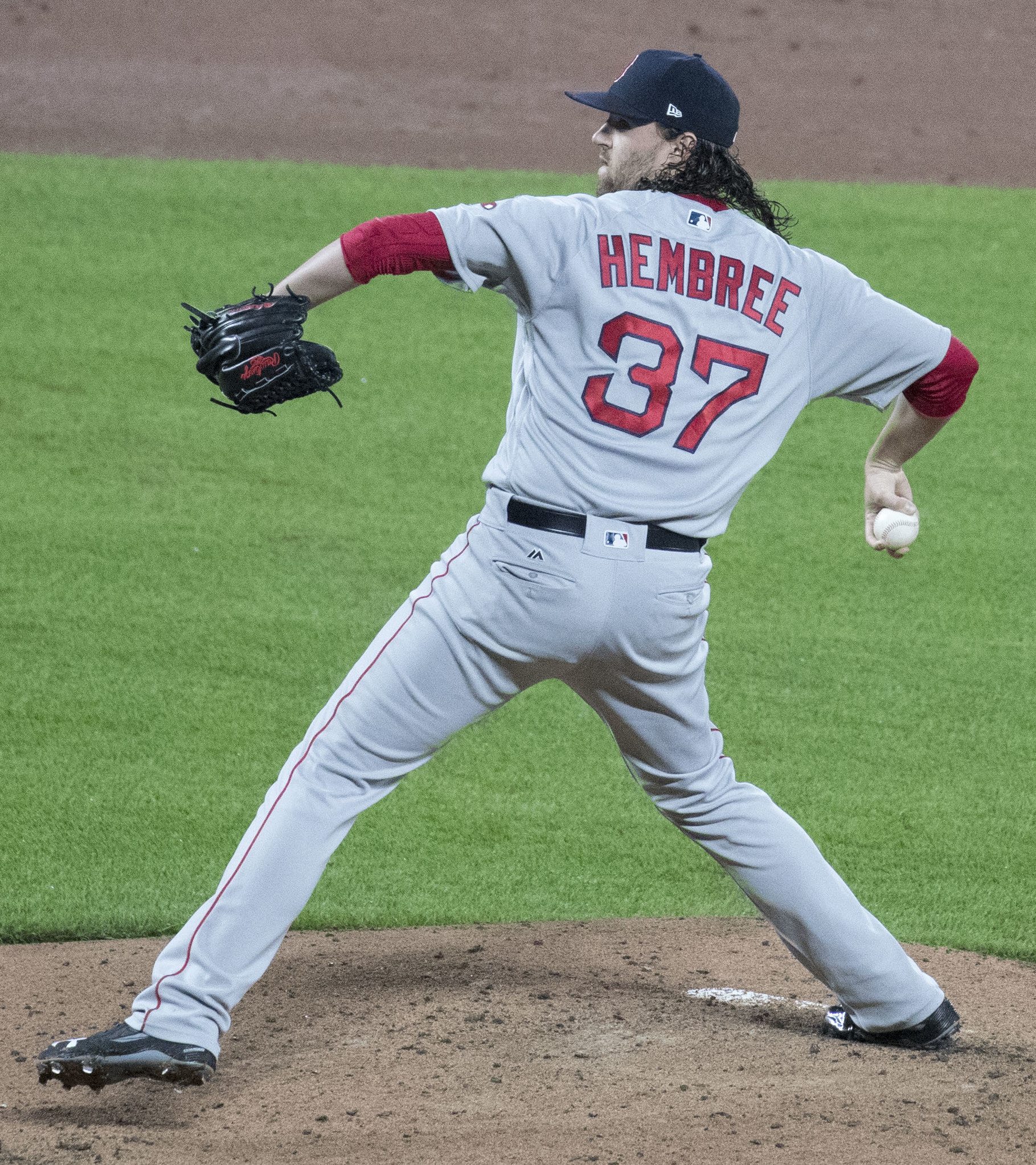
Heath Hembree got his first MLB save on May 8.

The opening game of the series saw all of Baltimore's runs come on a grand slam by Jonathan Villar off of Josh Smith, who was making a spot start for Boston. The Red Sox plated only a single run, resulting in a 4–1 loss. The first five batters in Boston's order were a collective 0-for-19. With David Price on the injured list, Héctor Velázquez started the second game of the series, leaving after three innings with the score tied, 2–2. Marcus Walden then pitched three innings in relief, later getting credit for the win, as Boston led 6–3 after six innings. Matt Barnes closed out the 8–5 win with a four-out save. J. D. Martinez hit his 200th MLB career home run; Xander Bogaerts and Mitch Moreland also homered. The final game of the series featured Chris Sale holding the Orioles to three hits and one run through eight innings, including pitching an immaculate inning in the bottom of the seventh. Sale received a no decision, as the game went to extra innings, tied 1–1. There were no runs scored in the first two extra frames, with Jackie Bradley Jr. reaching over the outfield wall to prevent a game-winning homer by Trey Mancini in the bottom of the 11th. Andrew Benintendi hit a solo home run to give Boston a 2–1 lead in the top of the 12th, and Heath Hembree closed out the win with his first MLB save. The win gave the Red Sox a 19–19 record, the first time the team was at .500 since the second game of the season.

Red Sox won the series 2–1 (11–10 runs)

May 10–May 12, vs. Seattle Mariners

Eduardo Rodríguez started the first game of the series, holding Seattle scoreless through seven innings. Boston's offense had 15 hits, winning by a 14–1 score. Andrew Benintendi, Rafael Devers, and Mitch Moreland each homered. With the win, the Red Sox reached 20–19, their first winning record of the season. In the second game of the series, Seattle jumped out to an early 4–0 lead in the top of the first inning; Boston responded with one run in bottom of the second and eight runs in the bottom of the third. Boston's 9–5 victory gave the team their first four-game winning streak of the season. Rick Porcello went 6 2/3 innings and got the win. Every Boston batter walked at least once, while Moreland and Sandy León each homered. The final game of the series was an 11–2 Boston win, with Michael Chavis going 3-for-5 at the plate with five RBIs, while J. D. Martinez had two home runs.

Red Sox won the series 3–0 (34–8 runs)

May 14–May 15, vs. Colorado Rockies

In the opener of a two-game series, Chris Sale struck out 17 batters, a new career high. He left the game after seven innings with a 3–2 lead, but received a no decision as the game went to extra innings, tied 4–4. Colorado scored a run in the 11th inning off of two walks and a single for a 5–4 win, ending Boston's winning streak at five games. Boston's relievers had seven more strikeouts; the total of 24 tied the single-game record for the Red Sox franchise. The second game of the series also went to extra innings; after Boston built an early 5–0 lead, Colorado tied the game at five in the seventh inning. In the 10th inning, the Rockies had a leadoff double, but were unable to score. In Boston's half of the inning, Xander Bogaerts doubled, Rafael Devers was intentionally walked, and then Michael Chavis drove in Bogaerts to give the Red Sox the win, 6–5.

Red Sox tied the series 1–1 (10–10 runs)

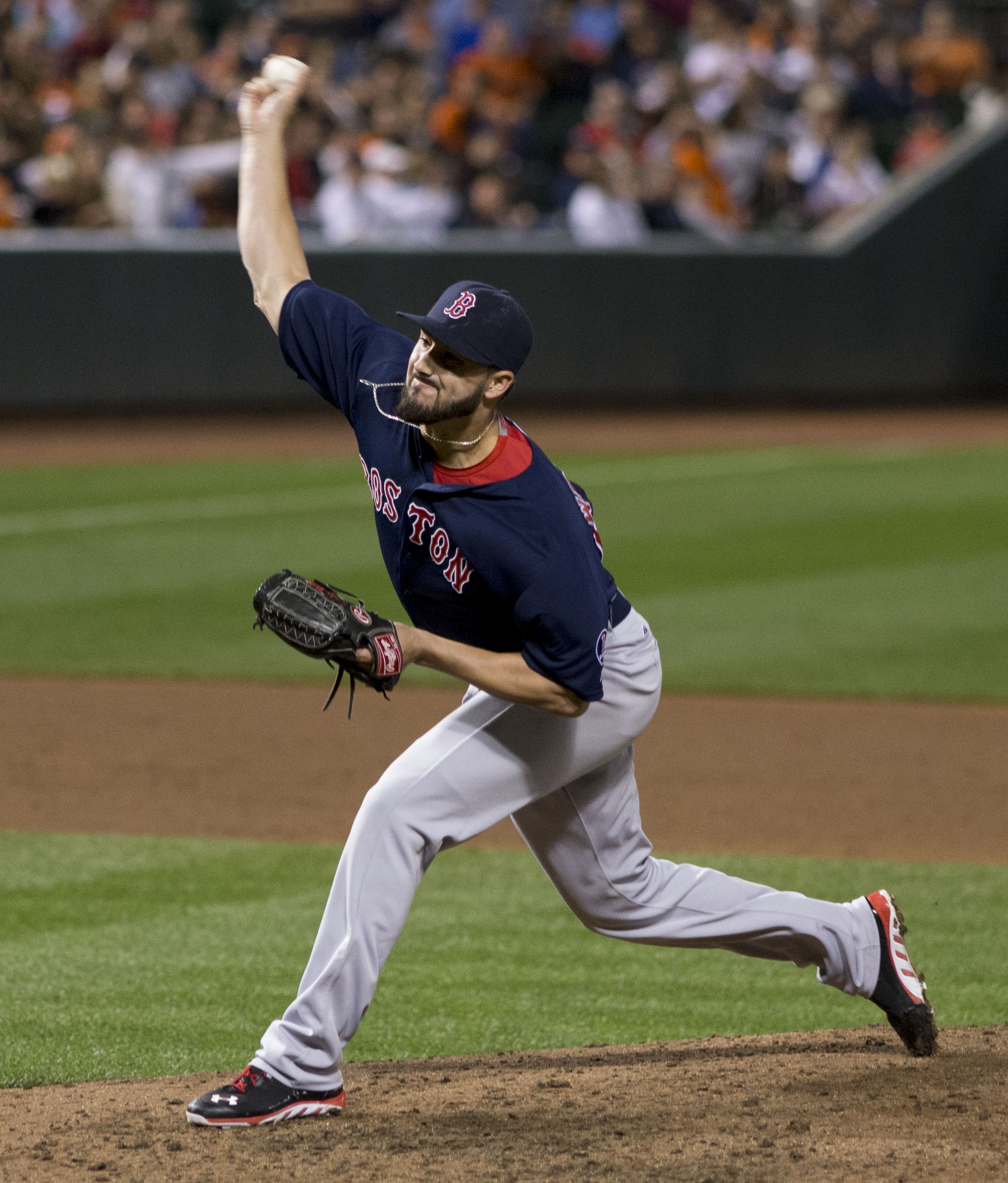
Brandon Workman recorded his first MLB save on May 19.

May 17–May 19, vs. Houston Astros

Boston lost the first game of a three-game series, 3–1. A two-run homer by George Springer in the eighth inning took the Astros from a 1–0 deficit to a 2–1 lead. Xander Bogaerts and Christian Vázquez each had three hits for the Red Sox. Houston scored five runs in the second game of the series before Boston had a chance to bat, chasing starter Héctor Velázquez after 1/3 of an inning. Boston got no closer than trailing by three runs, 6–3, after the fourth inning, as the Astros went on to win, 7–3. Vázquez homered for the Red Sox. In the final game of the series, Houston had a 3–1 lead after three innings. In the fifth inning, Boston tied the game, 3–3, on a Michael Chavis solo home run, followed by a Mookie Betts double and Bogaerts RBI single. Bogaerts again drove in Betts in the seventh inning, giving the Red Sox what proved to be the winning run in a 4–3 victory. Brandon Workman got the save, the first of his MLB career.

Red Sox lost the series 1–2 (8–13 runs)

May 20–May 23, at Toronto Blue Jays

The Red Sox won the first game of the series, 12–2, while out-hitting the Blue Jays, 16 to 3. Michael Chavis, Jackie Bradley Jr., Xander Bogaerts, and Rafael Devers all homered. Boston lost the second game of the series, 10–3, after Toronto jumped out to a 6–0 lead through five innings, powered by DH Rowdy Tellez with two home runs for five RBIs. Boston's runs came on three solo homers; by Bradley Jr., Devers, and Mitch Moreland. The third game of the series was a 6–5 Boston win in 13 innings. Toronto erased one-run deficits both in the bottom of the ninth and in the bottom of the 12th. Boston's winning run came on a Chavis homer; Devers and Mookie Betts also homered earlier in the game. In the final game of the series, Toronto scored first and last, however it was a Boston win, 8–2. Ryan Weber held the Blue Jays to one run on three hits in six innings, earning his first MLB win as a starting pitcher. Steve Pearce hit his first home run of the season.

Red Sox won the series 3–1 (29–19 runs)

May 24–May 26, at Houston Astros

Boston out-hit Houston, 7–4, in the first game of the series, but lost, 4–3. Chris Sale allowed four runs (two earned) in six innings and took the loss, falling to 1–6 on the season. Houston had a 4–0 lead through four innings, with Boston scoring on solo home runs by Xander Bogaerts, Jackie Bradley Jr., and Christian Vázquez in the sixth, eighth, and ninth innings, respectively. In the second game of the series, Red Sox starter David Price left in the first inning, due to flu-like symptoms. The game remained scoreless until Houston took a 2–0 lead in the sixth inning. Boston rallied to tied the game in the top of the ninth, 3–3, but was unable to take the lead, despite having runners on first and third with no outs. In the bottom of the ninth, the Astros had a double, two walks, and a game-winning single by Carlos Correa, giving the Red Sox another 4–3 loss. Houston took a 1–0 first-inning lead in the final game of the series, however Boston scored four unanswered runs to win, 4–1. Rafael Devers hit his seventh home run of the season and Marcus Walden got the save.

Red Sox lost the series 1–2 (10–9 runs)

May 27–May 29, vs. Cleveland Indians

Cleveland took an early 3–0 lead in the first game of the series, with Boston evening the score, 3–3, at the end of four innings. Boston then scored six runs in the fifth, and went on to win, 12–5. Sandy León had a three-run homer and J. D. Martinez hit two home runs. The second game of the series had a 69-minute rain delay during the second inning. Scoreless until the sixth inning, Boston took a 3–0 lead, and held a 5–2 lead going into the ninth inning. Cleveland rallied for five runs in the ninth, with the tying runs being charged to Ryan Brasier, and Travis Lakins taking the loss as Boston fell, 7–5. The final game of the series featured 23 runs and 32 hits, with Cleveland winning, 14–9. Four different Red Sox homered, including Andrew Benintendi, who had three RBIs.

Red Sox lost the series 1–2 (26–26 runs)

May 30–May 31, at New York Yankees
The first game of the series was postponed due to rain and rescheduled for August 3 at 7 p.m. In Friday's game, Boston took an early lead on a second-inning Rafael Devers solo home run, but New York scored four unanswered runs to win, 4–1, giving the Red Sox their fifth defeat in seven games. Chris Sale took the loss and fell to 1–7 for the season, as Boston (29–28) ended the month 8 1/2 games behind the division-leading Yankees (37–19).

June

=== June ===
June 1–June 2, at New York Yankees (cont'd)
Boston scored first in Saturday's game, with New York taking a 3–1 lead at the end of the second inning. The Red Sox tied the game in the fourth inning, on a solo home run by Xander Bogaerts and an RBI single by Sandy León. A two-run homer by Yankees catcher Gary Sánchez in the fifth inning was the only other scoring of the game. New York's 5–3 victory put them 9 1/2 games ahead of Boston, as the Red Sox fell back to .500 (29–29) for the season. In the final game of the series, Boston led the entire way, with New York drawing no closer than 3–2 at the end of the fourth inning, en route to an 8–5 Red Sox win. Bogaerts and J. D. Martinez both homered. Before the game, manager Alex Cora announced that Mookie Betts would be the team's leadoff hitter for the rest of the season, as he had been during 2018.

Red Sox lost the series 1–2 (12–14 runs)

June 4–June 6, at Kansas City Royals
After Kansas City had an early 2–0 lead in the opening game of the series, Boston went ahead by a run in the sixth. Eduardo Núñez then hit a pinch hit three-run homer in the eighth inning, as Boston pulled away for an 8–3 win. The middle game of the series was a complete game shutout by Chris Sale, who also pitched his second immaculate inning of the season. Rafael Devers hit his ninth home run of the season as Boston won, 8–0. Boston completed the sweep with a 7–5 win on Thursday afternoon, using seven pitchers with Colten Brewer getting the win. Mookie Betts hit his 10th home run of the season.

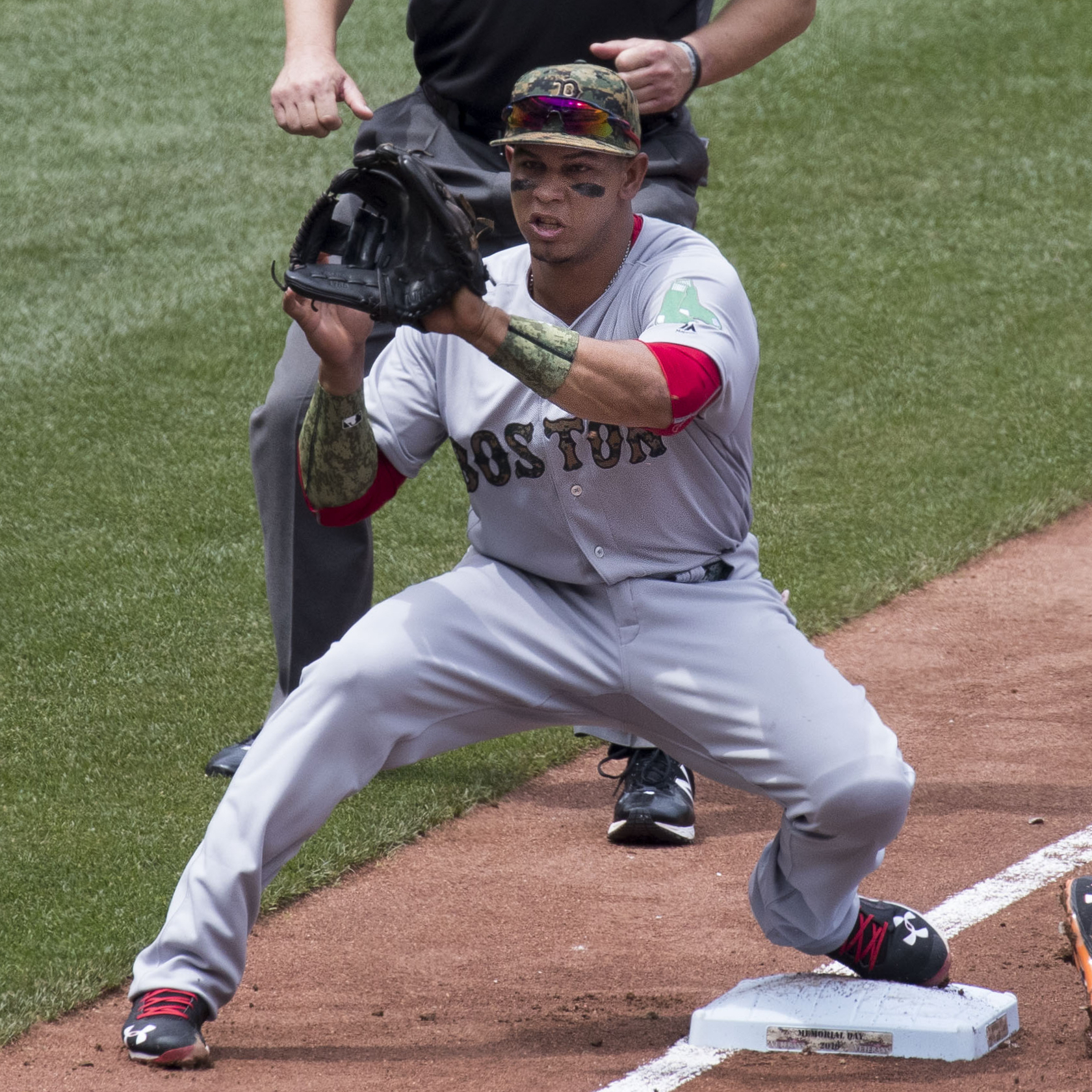
On June 8, Marco Hernández played in his first MLB game since May 2017.

Red Sox won the series 3–0 (23–8 runs)

June 7–June 9, vs. Tampa Bay Rays
The Rays defeated the Red Sox, 5–1, in the opening game of the series, as Tampa Bay starter Yonny Chirinos did not allow a baserunner until the sixth inning. Xander Bogaerts had two of Boston's four hits, and the team's only RBI. In the first game of a Saturday doubleheader, Tampa Bay had a 4–1 lead at the end of the second inning, and went on to win, 9–2. Marco Hernández played in his first MLB game since the 2017 season, and Jackie Bradley Jr. hit his fifth home run of the season. The second game of the doubleheader was a 5–1 Red Sox win, as David Price held the Rays to one run in six innings, with 10 strikeouts. The final game of the series was a 6–1 Rays win on Sunday, with Hernández driving in Boston's only run.

Red Sox lost the series 1–3 (9–21 runs)

June 10–June 13, vs. Texas Rangers
Chris Sale started the series' opener, holding Texas to one run (unearned) on three hits in seven innings, while striking out 10. Boston held a 2–1 lead going into the ninth, however the Rangers rallied for two runs, going ahead 3–2. Brock Holt then had a two-out RBI in the bottom of the ninth to send the game to extra innings. Texas scored what proved to be the winning run in the top of the 11th, on a double and a single, for a 4–3 final. The second game of the series was a 9–5 Rangers win, dropping the Red Sox back to .500 on the season (34–34). The game included an inside-the-park home run by Hunter Pence, ejections of both managers (Alex Cora for Boston, Chris Woodward for Texas), and the first career ejection of Andrew Benintendi. Texas took a 2–1 first-inning lead in the third game of the series, with Boston going ahead 3–2 in the fifth inning, and the Rangers tying the score at 3–3 in the top of the eighth. In the bottom of the ninth, the Red Sox loaded the bases on a double, and single, and a walk. Mookie Betts then also walked, forcing in Marco Hernández with the winning run, 4–3. In the final game of the series, the Red Sox were down 6–1 in the middle of the second inning, with starter David Price leaving the game after allowing six runs on five hits in 1 1/3 innings. Boston then used seven relief pitchers, who did not allow any more runs. The offense tied the game in the fifth inning, and a home run by Xander Bogaerts (one of five the team hit) in the seventh inning put Boston ahead, 7–6. With a depleted bullpen and Heath Hembree not available, Josh Smith closed out the victory for his first MLB save.

Red Sox tied the series 2–2 (19–22 runs)

June 14–June 16, at Baltimore Orioles

In the opener of a three-game series in Baltimore, Boston had 16 hits including six home runs, for a 13–2 win. Eduardo Rodríguez held the Orioles to one run in seven innings, improving his record on the season to 7–4. The second game was scoreless until the sixth inning, with the Red Sox taking a 3–2 lead, en route to a 7–2 final. Chris Sale got the win and improved his record to 3–7, while J. D. Martinez hit his 16th home run of the season. Boston trailed Baltimore, 3–2, going into the ninth inning of the final game of the series, when a home run by Marco Hernández tied the game and sent it to extra innings. The Red Sox then outscored the Orioles, 5–3, in the extra frame, giving Boston an 8–6 victory and their fifth consecutive win.

Red Sox won the series 3–0 (28–10 runs)

June 17–June 19, at Minnesota Twins

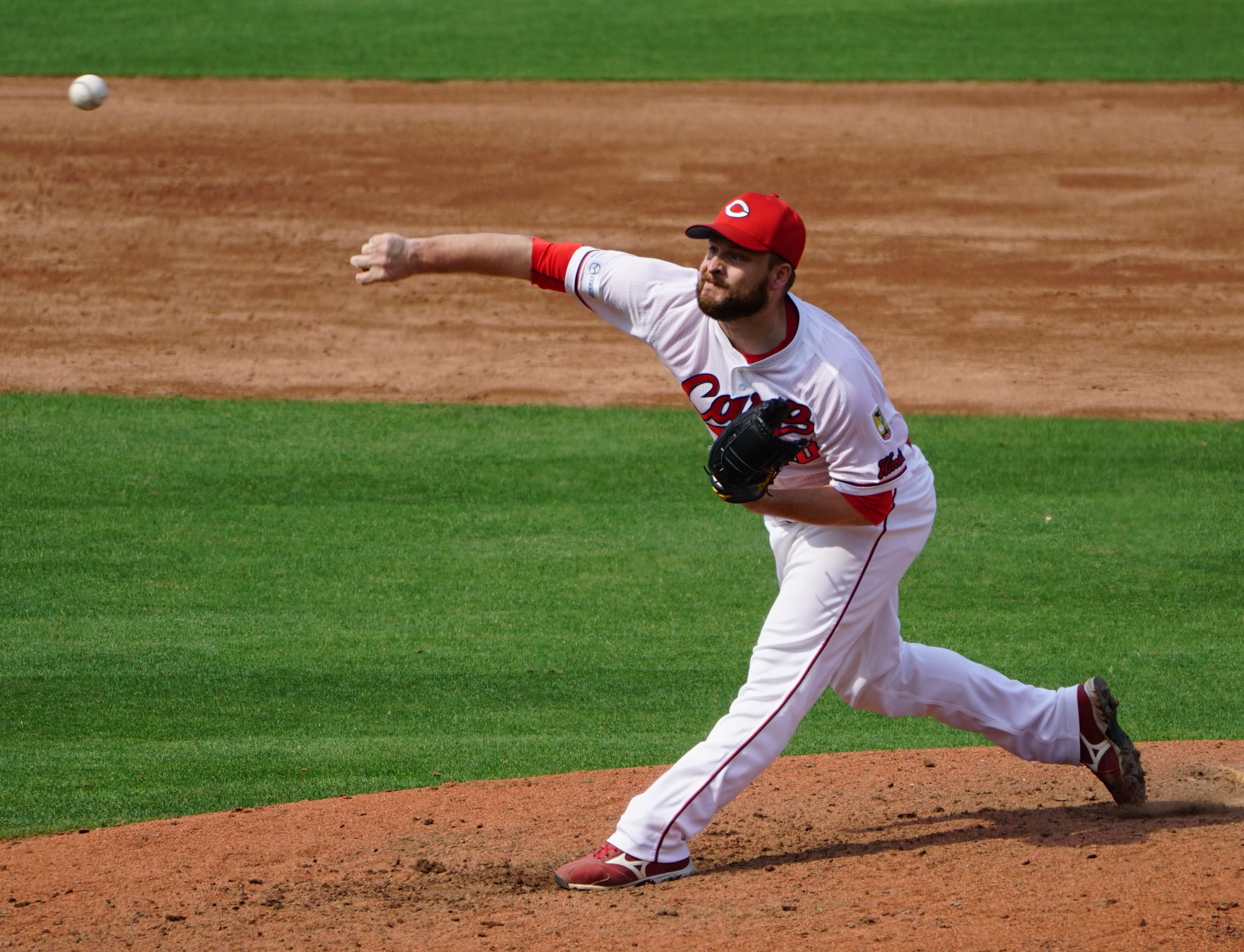
Ryan Brasier notched his seventh save on June 17.

Boston extended their winning streak to six games, with a 2–0 win in the series' opener in Minnesota. The only runs of the game came on three singles to open the game, and a pair of ninth-inning doubles. Rick Porcello improved his record to 5–6, while Ryan Brasier recorded his seventh save of the year. The second game of the series was Boston's longest to this point in the season, as the teams were tied, 2–2, at the end of regulation. In the 13th inning, Mookie Betts homered for the Red Sox and Max Kepler homered for the Twins, leaving the game still tied, 3–3. Although Andrew Benintendi reached third base with no outs in the top of the 17th, he was left stranded there. In the bottom of the inning, the Twins loaded the bases with one out on a single, a double, and an intentional walk; Kepler then drove in the winning run with a single to right field. J. D. Martinez and Twins third baseman Miguel Sano each struck out five times in the game. Minnesota led the final game of the series, 4–3, after four innings. Boston then scored the final six runs of the game for the win, 9–4. Eduardo Rodríguez improved his season record to 8–4.

Red Sox won the series 2–1 (14–8 runs)

June 21–June 23, vs. Toronto Blue Jays
In the series' opener, the Red Sox fell behind, 4–1, at the end of four innings. At the end of seven, Toronto still led, 5–4, but Boston tied the game in the eighth, and the game went to extra innings. Christian Vázquez then hit a two-run walk-off home run in the bottom of the tenth, giving the Red Sox a 7–5 win. Boston held a 6–0 lead after three innings in the second game of the series, only to have Toronto go ahead, 8–6, in the eighth inning. A Red Sox rally in the ninth inning came up a run short, resulting in an 8–7 loss. Boston's bullpen allowed seven runs in the final four innings. The final game of the series was a 6–1 Blue Jays win, as the Red Sox did not score until the ninth inning.

Red Sox lost the series 1–2 (15–19 runs)

June 24–June 26, vs. Chicago White Sox
Trailing 2–1 after four innings of the first game of the series, Boston scored a single run in each remaining inning, for a 6–5 win. The winning run came on an infield single by Marco Hernández with the bases loaded and two outs in the bottom of the ninth. Start time of the second game of the series was delayed for 24 minutes by rain. The teams then traded early runs, and were tied 3–3 after three innings. The Red Sox went on to score the final three runs of the game, for a 6–3 win. Xander Bogaerts hit his 15th home run of the season, while starter David Price improved his record to 5–2. Boston was unable to complete the sweep on Wednesday afternoon, as Chicago scored two runs in the top of the ninth inning via a José Abreu homer for an 8–7 win. Matt Barnes was charged with his sixth blown save of the season, and took the loss. The White Sox had early leads of 3–2 and 5–3, while the Red Sox had gone ahead, 7–6, via three runs in the bottom of the eighth.

Red Sox won the series 2–1 (19–16 runs)

June 29–June 30, vs. New York Yankees in London, United Kingdom

The first MLB game played in Europe opened with the Yankees scoring six runs in the top of the first inning, chasing Boston starter Rick Porcello after one-third of an inning. The Red Sox responded with six runs of their own in the bottom of the first, as New York starter Masahiro Tanaka only lasted two-thirds of an inning. The Yankees built a 17–6 lead through five innings, which the Red Sox narrowed to 17–13 at the end of the seventh, but there was no further scoring. Michael Chavis had a pair of three-run home runs, while Jackie Bradley Jr. also homered. At 4 hours 42 minutes, the game was only three minutes shorter than the longest nine-inning game in MLB history (August 18, 2006, also between the Red Sox and Yankees). In the second and final game of the series, the Red Sox jumped out to a 4–0 first-inning lead. The Yankees scored two runs in the second, and it remained 4–2 until the seventh inning, when New York scored nine runs, giving them an 11–4 lead. Boston closed to 12–8 in the bottom of the eighth, and had the bases loaded with two outs, but there was no further scoring. The loss, Boston's third in a row, left the team with a 44–40 record at the end of June, 11 games behind New York in the American League East standings.

Red Sox lost the series 0–2 (21–29 runs)

July

=== July ===
July 2–July 4, at Toronto Blue Jays

In the opening game of the series, Boston scored four runs in the top of the first inning, and built a 7–1 lead en route to a 10–6 victory. Starting pitcher David Price limited the Blue Jays to four hits and two runs in six innings. Rafael Devers had two home runs and six RBIs, while Christian Vázquez went 3-for-5 with a homer. The second game of the series was tied, 3–3, after four innings. The only further scoring was three runs by the Blue Jays, handing the Red Sox a 6–3 defeat. Vázquez hit his 13th home run of the season, Chris Sale saw his record fall to 3–8, and Xander Bogaerts had a golden sombrero (four strikeouts) for the first time in his career. In the final game of the series, a nine-run sixth inning and a pinch hit home run by Marco Hernández in the ninth gave Boston an 8–7 win. Devers and Michael Chavis also homered.

Red Sox won the series 2–1 (21–19 runs)

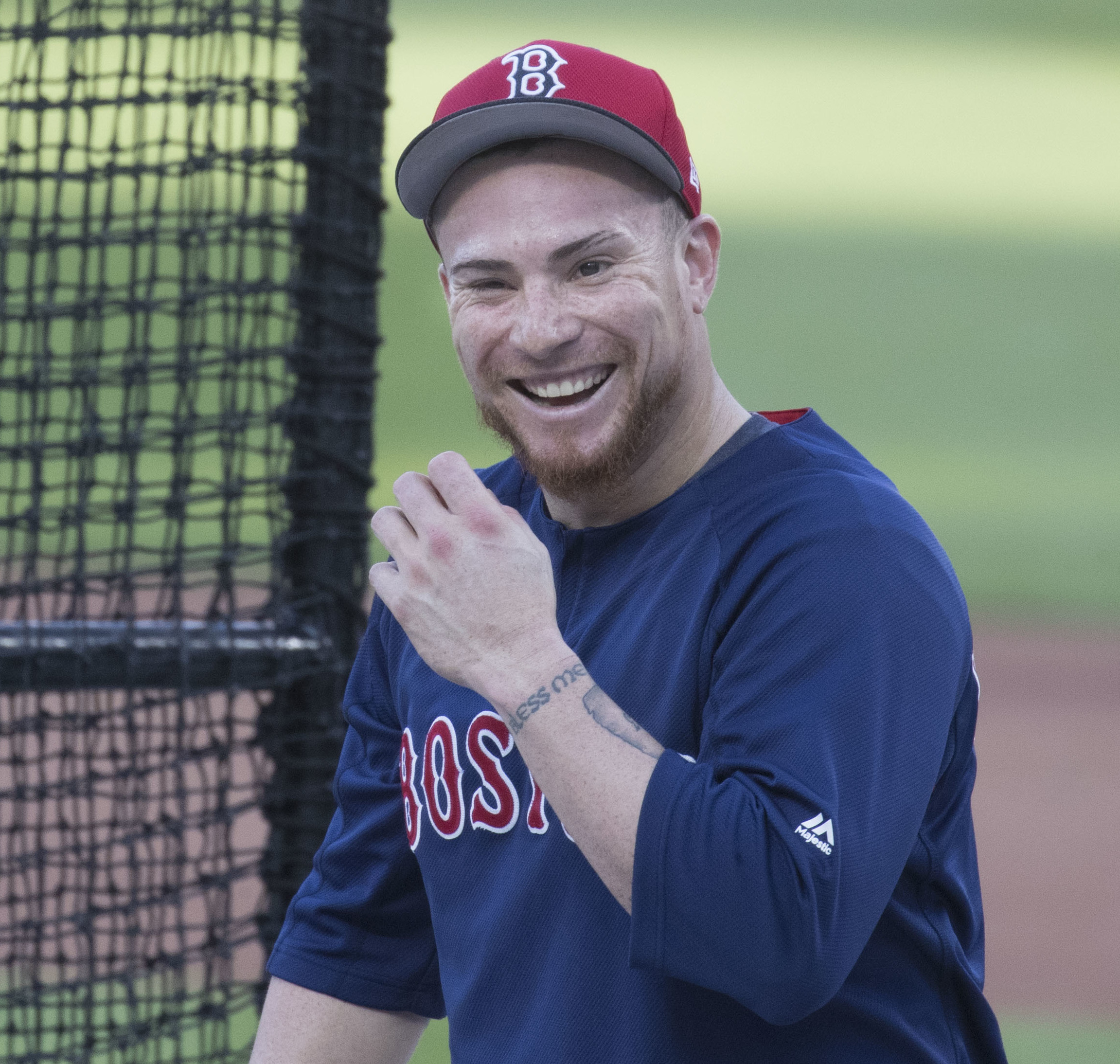
Christian Vázquez had 14 home runs at the All-Star break.

July 5–July 7, at Detroit Tigers

Boston won the opener of the series, 9–6, in a game that included a two-hour rain delay. Rafael Devers and Xander Bogaerts each homered, their 16th and 17th of the season, respectively. The start of the second game of the series was delayed by rain for four hours. Boston then jumped out to an early 5–0 lead, and went on to win, 10–6. Andrew Benintendi was 4-for-6 at the plate, only lacking a home run for the cycle. On Sunday, the Red Sox completed a series sweep with a 6–3 win. David Price improved his record on the season to 7–2, and Christian Vázquez hit his 14th home run of the year. Boston reached the All-Star break with a record of 49–41 (0.544 winning percentage), nine games behind the division-leading Yankees, and two games behind Cleveland for the second wild card spot.

Red Sox won the series 3–0 (25–15 runs)

July 9, All-Star Game at Progressive Field

In a 4–3 American League win, all three Boston all-stars played, but were hitless. J. D. Martinez started at DH and was 0-for-2, Xander Bogaerts grounded out as a pinch hitter, and Mookie Betts appeared as a defensive replacement without batting. Alex Cora managed the American League team, with assistance from his Red Sox coaches and Cleveland Indians manager Terry Francona.

July 12–July 14, vs. Los Angeles Dodgers

In this three-game series between the teams that contested the 2018 World Series, Boston won the opener, 8–1, in a game that included a one-hour rain delay. Red Sox starter Eduardo Rodríguez improved his record to 10–4 for the season, allowing only five hits and one run in seven innings. Rafael Devers, Christian Vázquez, and Xander Bogaerts each homered. The second game of the series was a one-run game entering the fifth inning, but turned into an 11–2 Dodgers' win. Chris Sale saw his record for the season fall to 3–9; Bogaerts had Boston's only home run and both RBIs. In the final game of the series, Boston fought back from a 4–2 deficit to tie the game in the eighth; the game then went to extra innings. The Red Sox were not able to capitalize on a leadoff double by Jackie Bradley Jr. in the 11th. The Dodgers went on to score three runs in the 12th, giving Boston a 7–4 loss. Duration of the game was five hours and 40 minutes.

Red Sox lost the series 1–2 (14–19 runs)

July 15–July 18, vs. Toronto Blue Jays

The first game in this four-game series was a 10–8 Boston win; a two-run victory after the Red Sox had held leads of 5–0 and 10–4. Eight different Red Sox players scored, and Michael Chavis hit his first MLB grand slam. Toronto won the second game, 10–4, as Andrew Cashner took the loss in his first start with Boston, having allowed six runs (five earned) on eight hits in five innings. Xander Bogaerts hit his 21st home run of the season. The Red Sox won the third game, 5–4, with Eduardo Rodríguez improving his record on the season to 11–4. Rafael Devers went 3-for-4 at the plate, including his 18th home run of the year, and had four RBIs. Boston won the final game of the series, 5–0, with Chris Sale getting his first win at Fenway Park since July 11, 2018. Devers and Mookie Betts both homered.

Red Sox won the series 3–1 (24–22 runs)

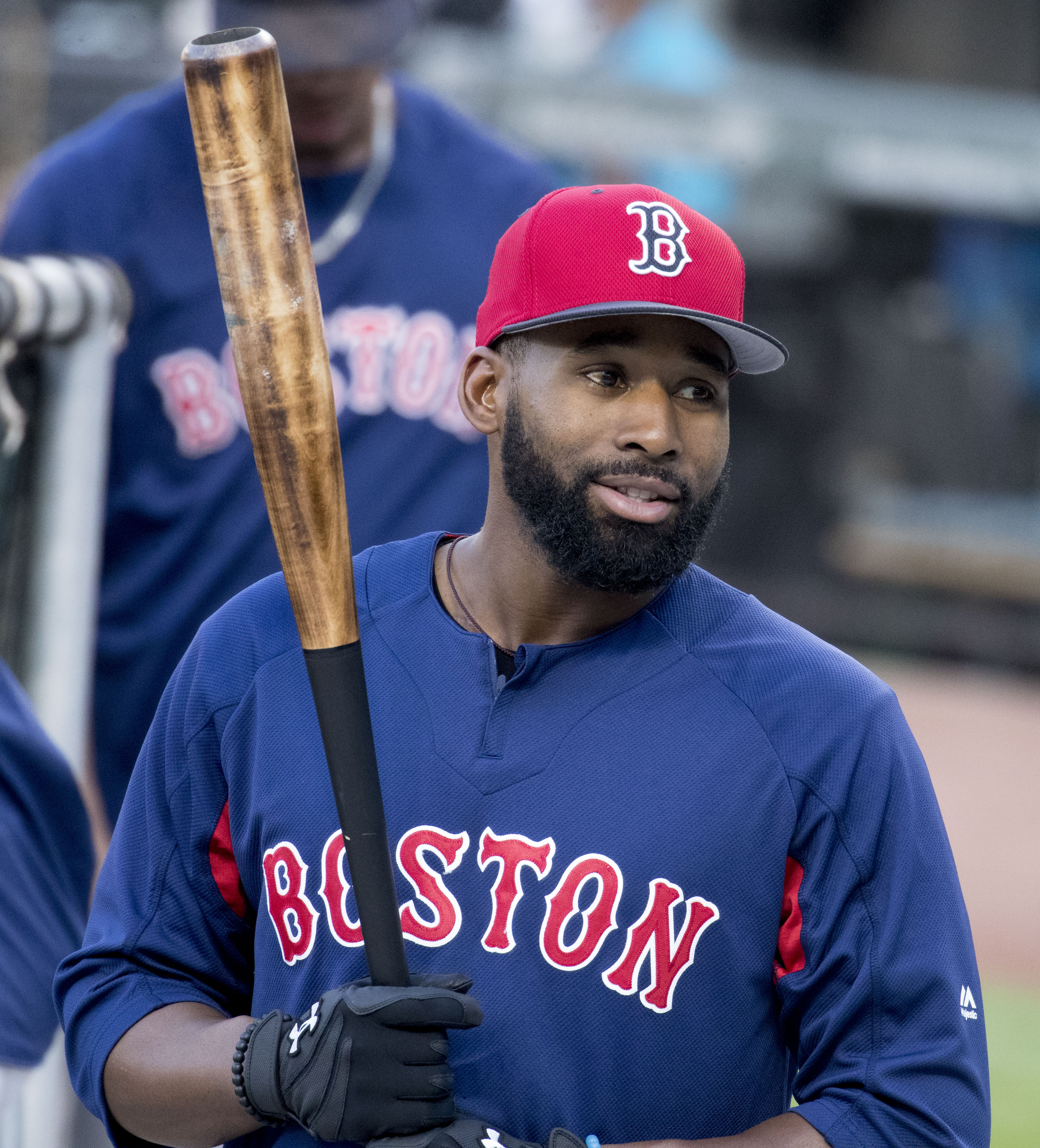
Jackie Bradley Jr. had a pair of three-run homers on July 20.

July 19–July 21, at Baltimore Orioles

Baltimore won the opener of this three-game series, 11–2, as Boston's only runs came on a second-inning two-run homer by Sam Travis. In the middle game of the series, Boston took an early 5–0 lead, with Baltimore tying the game, 5–5, in the third inning. Boston then scored eight runs in the fourth inning, en route to a 17–6 win. Jackie Bradley Jr. hit a pair of three-run home runs; Rafael Devers, Mookie Betts, and Sandy León also homered. Baltimore took the closing game of the series, 5–0, as the Red Sox were held to one hit, a seventh-inning double by Devers.

Red Sox lost the series 1–2 (19–22 runs)

July 22–July 24, at Tampa Bay Rays

Boston won the series' first game, 9–4, mainly powered by a seven-run third inning, which saw J. D. Martinez, Andrew Benintendi, and Sam Travis each homer. Eduardo Rodríguez improved his record on the season to 12–4. The second game was also a Boston win, 5–4. Christian Vázquez had a pinch hit home run, and the Red Sox reached 10 games over .500 (56–46) for the first time this season. The final game of the series included a formal protest by the Red Sox, "due to placement of substitutes in the lineup following the removal of the DH." On the field, Boston had a 2–0 lead through three innings, however the Rays then scored three unanswered runs to win, 3–2.

Red Sox won the series 2–1 (16–11 runs)

July 25–July 28, vs. New York Yankees

In the opener of a four-game series, the Red Sox scored seven runs in the first inning and went on to a 19–3 win, setting a franchise record for the most runs scored in a game against the Yankees. Boston had 10 doubles, including two by Michael Chavis, who entered the game after Brock Holt was ejected. Xander Bogaerts had two home runs, while Rafael Devers and Sandy León also homered. In the second game of the series, Boston scored three first-inning runs, led 7–0 after four innings, and went on to a 10–5 win. Andrew Cashner held the Yankees to three runs on 10 hits in 6 2/3 innings. Mookie Betts had the fifth three-homer game of his career, and J. D. Martinez also homered. The Red Sox reached 11 games over .500 (58–47) for the first time this year. Boston also won the third game of the series, 9–5, with Martinez and Andrew Benintendi hitting home runs. The Red Sox were unable to complete the sweep, as the Yankees won Sunday's game, 9–6. The two teams combined for five errors, including a throwing error by Jackie Bradley Jr. that allowed two runs to score. Benintendi again homered, while Chris Sale saw his record fall to 5–10 on the season.

Red Sox won the series 3–1 (44–22 runs)

July 30–July 31, vs. Tampa Bay Rays

Boston scored two first-inning runs in the opening game of the series and held a 5–4 lead after five innings, but fell to Tampa Bay, 6–5. The Red Sox left seven runners on base in the final three innings. Andrew Benintendi homered for the third consecutive game. In the series' second game, the Rays had a 5–0 lead after two innings, and went on to an 8–5 win. J. D. Martinez and Michael Chavis each homered. Boston finished July with three consecutive losses; at 59–50, the team was 10 games behind the division-leading Yankees, and 2 1/2 games out of the second wild card spot.

August

=== August ===
August 1, vs. Tampa Bay Rays (cont'd)

Tampa Bay completed their sweep of the three-game series with a 9–4 win. Xander Bogaerts had two home runs, and Mookie Betts also homered. Andrew Benintendi was 3-for-4 at the plate with three doubles. With four losses in a row, Boston fell to 59–51 on the season.

Red Sox lost the series 0–3 (14–23 runs)

August 2–4, at New York Yankees

The opening game of this series—with four games to be played in three days, due to a rainout earlier in the season—was won by New York, 4–2. All scoring occurred in the first inning, with Boston's runs coming on a J. D. Martinez home run with Xander Bogaerts on base. The Red Sox' losing streak reached five games, for the first time since their 2015 season. New York won the second game of the series, 9–2, in the first game of a Saturday doubleheader. Boston's two runs came on solo homers by Jackie Bradley Jr. and Andrew Benintendi. Red Sox manager Alex Cora and starting pitcher Chris Sale were both ejected in the fourth inning. A 6–4 loss to the Yankees in the second game of the doubleheader gave the Red Sox their seventh loss in a row. Rafael Devers hit his 22nd home run of the season. The Yankees completed the sweep on Sunday evening with a 7–4 win. Christian Vázquez and Michael Chavis both homered, as the Red Sox' losing streak reached eight games.

Red Sox lost the series 0–4 (12–26 runs)

August 5–7, vs. Kansas City Royals

The Red Sox ended their losing streak with a 7–5 win in the first of three games against the Royals. Sam Travis and Rafael Devers each homered, with Brandon Workman recording his sixth save of the year. Kansas City won the second game of the series, 6–2, scoring all their runs off of Boston starter Andrew Cashner in 5 1/3 innings. The final game of the series saw Boston take a 4–2 lead through five innings, with Kansas City coming back to tie the game, 4–4, after seven innings. With no further scoring in regulation, the game went to extra innings, and entered a rain delay in the top of the 10th inning. At approximately 12:30 a.m., the game was officially suspended—the Royals returned to Fenway on August 22 at 1:05 p.m. to complete the game. For completion of the game and series, see August 22.

Series was tied 1–1, pending completion of suspended game

August 8–11, vs. Los Angeles Angels

The first game of the four-game series was won by Boston, 3–0. Chris Sale held Los Angeles to two hits in eight innings, improving his record on the year to 6–11. Red Sox scoring came on a two-run homer by Sam Travis and a solo homer by Sandy León. Boston won the second game, 16–4, while also outhitting the Angels, 14–3. J. D. Martinez was 4-for-5 at the plate, with two home runs and two doubles. Mookie Betts, Rafael Devers, and Mitch Moreland also homered. The Angels responded to their 12-run loss on Friday with an 8-run win on Saturday, 12–4. Sam Travis hit his fifth home run of the season. Los Angeles took an early 3–0 lead in the final game of the series, with Boston going ahead, 4–3, after five innings. An eighth-inning run by the Angels tied the game, which went to extra innings; a tenth-inning run gave Los Angeles the win, 5–4. Christian Vázquez hit his 18th home run of the season.

Red Sox tied the series 2–2 (27–21 runs)

August 12–14, at Cleveland Indians

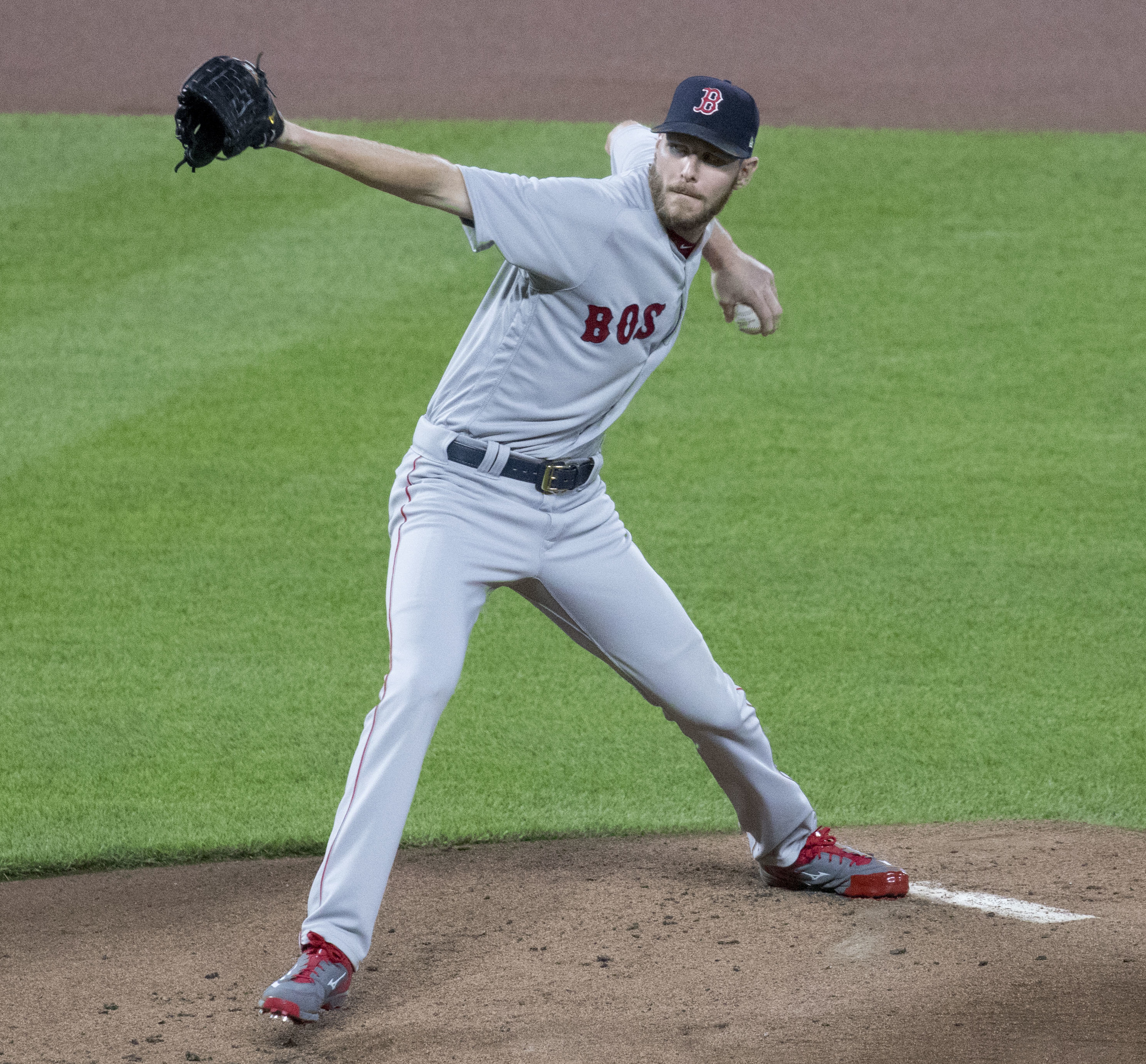
Chris Sale recorded his 2,000th MLB strikeout on August 13.

In the series' opening game, Boston trailed, 5–1, after three innings. Two runs by the Red Sox in the fourth, one in the seventh, and one in the ninth resulted in a 5–5 tie. In the bottom of the ninth, Cleveland's Carlos Santana hit a walk-off home run, giving Boston their third loss in a row. Boston built a 6–1 lead midway through the sixth inning of the second game of the series, only to have Cleveland tie the game and force extra innings. A home run by Jackie Bradley Jr. in the top of the 10th inning proved to be the difference in a 7–6 Red Sox win. Andrew Cashner was used in relief and got the save, the first of his MLB career. Chris Sale recorded the 2,000th strikeout of his MLB career. Rafael Devers became the latest MLB player to record six hits in a game; he was 5-for-5 in the first nine innings, and had his sixth hit in the 10th inning. The Red Sox won the third and final game of the series, 5–1. Devers homered, and Xander Bogaerts hit two home runs.

Red Sox won the series 2–1 (17–13 runs)

August 16–18, vs. Baltimore Orioles

The opening game of the series was a 9–1 Boston win, as the Red Sox outhit the Orioles, 12–5. Mookie Betts hit his 21st home run of the season. Boston extended their winning streak to four games with a 4–0 win in the middle game of the series. Eduardo Rodríguez improved his record on the season to 14–5, while Brock Holt and Rafael Devers each homered. Boston completed the sweep on Sunday, coming back from a 6–0 deficit to record a 13–7 win. Devers and Sam Travis each homered, as Boston used seven pitchers, with Marcus Walden getting the win. Devers became the first MLB players to reach 100 RBIs on the season.

Red Sox won the series 3–0 (26–8 runs)

August 20–21, vs. Philadelphia Phillies

Boston lost the opening inter-league game against Philadelphia, 3–2. All three Phillies runs came in the first inning, from a walk, two doubles, and a single. Both Red Sox runs came in the third inning, as Jackie Bradley Jr. hit a two-run homer. Boston's five-game winning streak ended as the team fell to 67–60 on the season. Philadelphia then swept the two-game series with a 5–2 win, despite the Red Sox outhitting the Phillies, 8–6. Bradley Jr. homered again, his 16th of the season. Rick Porcello took the loss and fell to 11–10 on the season.

Red Sox lost the series 0–2 (4–8 runs)

August 22, vs. Kansas City Royals

This was the resumption of the suspended game from August 7, which was halted due to rain with no outs in the top of the 10th with no runners on base and the score tied, 4–4. The Red Sox allowed anyone under 18 years old to enter Fenway Park for free; all other tickets were only $5 each, with proceeds going to The Jimmy Fund. After retiring the Royals in order in the top of the 10th, Christian Vázquez hit a one-out double, which was followed by an intentional walk and then a game-winning single by Brock Holt.

Red Sox won the series 2–1 (14–15 runs)

August 23–25, at San Diego Padres

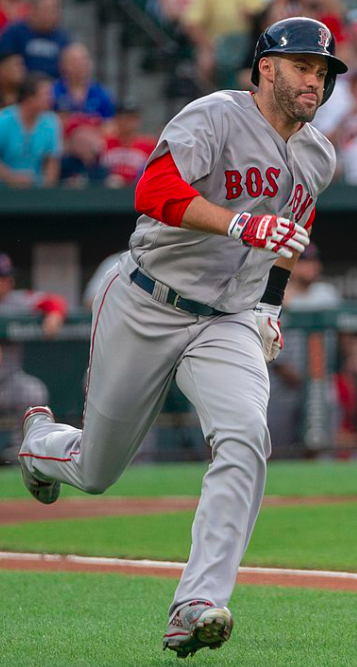
J. D. Martinez had seven RBIs on August 23.

This three-game series was held on Players Weekend, when MLB players are allowed and encouraged to put nicknames on the back of their uniforms. For the opening game, the nicknames used by Boston's starting lineup were as follows:

Order	No.	Player	Nickname	Pos.
1	50	Mookie Betts	MOOKIE	CF
2	11	Rafael Devers	CARITA	3B
3	2	Xander Bogaerts	X-MAN	SS
4	28	J. D. Martinez	FLACO	RF
5	16	Andrew Benintendi	BENNY	LF
6	7	Christian Vázquez	COLO	C
7	18	Mitch Moreland	2-BAGS	1B
8	12	Brock Holt	BH	2B
9	57	Eduardo Rodríguez	EL GUALO	P

In the opening game, Boston scored three runs in each of the first two innings, and went on to an 11–0 win. Eduardo Rodríguez got the win and improved his record on the season to 15–5. J. D. Martinez hit a pair of three-run homers, going 3-for-4 at the plate with seven RBIs. In the middle game of the series, the Red Sox had a 4–3 lead after four innings. San Diego tied the game with a run in the seventh, then Brock Holt's ninth-inning home run provided Boston's winning margin, 5–4. The Red Sox were unable to complete the sweep on Sunday, falling to the Padres, 3–1. Boston's run came on the 31st homer of the season by Martinez.

Red Sox won the series 2–1 (17–7 runs)

August 27–28, at Colorado Rockies

In this inter-league series, Boston took a 6–0 lead in the first game, and went on to a 10–6 win. Jackie Bradley Jr., Christian Vázquez, and Xander Bogaerts each homered. At an estimated distance of 478 feet (146 m), the homer by Bradley Jr. was the longest by a Red Sox player since Statcast was introduced in 2015. Boston completed the two-game sweep with a 7–4 win, as Eduardo Rodríguez got his 16th win of the season. Bogaerts hit two home runs, becoming the first Red Sox shortstop with 30 in a season since Nomar Garciaparra in 1998. J. D. Martinez and Rafael Devers also homered.

Red Sox won the series 2–0 (17–10 runs)

August 30–August 31, at Los Angeles Angels

In the series' opener, Boston took an early 4–0 lead, and had a 6–4 lead going to the bottom of the ninth inning, only to see the Angels tie the game and force extra innings. The tie held until Mookie Betts hit his second home run of the game in the top of the 15th inning, which proved to be the difference as the Red Sox won, 7–6. Duration of the game was 5 hours 23 minutes, and included the 33rd homer of the season by J. D. Martinez. In the middle game of the series, the Red Sox held a 4–3 lead after seven innings. In the bottom of the eighth, the Angels scored seven runs, and went on to win, 10–4. The loss left Boston with an overall record of 73–63, having accrued a record of 14–13 during August.

September

=== September ===
With expanded rosters allowed starting on September 1, the team added four pitchers (Jhoulys Chacín, Travis Lakins, Ryan Weber, and Héctor Velázquez) and two position players (catcher Juan Centeno and outfielder Gorkys Hernández). Following the end of the Triple-A season, on September 4 the team added four additional pitchers (Colten Brewer, Trevor Kelley, Bobby Poyner, and Mike Shawaryn).

September 1, at Los Angeles Angels (cont'd)

Boston won the third game of the series, 4–3. Xander Bogaerts and J. D. Martinez each homered, with Bogaerts going 3-for-4 with three RBIs. Brandon Workman recorded his 10th save of the season.

Red Sox won the series 2–1 (15–19 runs)

September 3–5, vs. Minnesota Twins

In the first game of the series, Minnesota took a 6–0 lead through the middle of the fifth inning. Boston closed to 6–4 at the end of the fifth, and to 6–5 at the end of the eighth. Despite a leadoff single in the bottom of the ninth, the Red Sox were unable to score again. Rick Porcello fell to 12–11 on the season, while Rafael Devers and Andrew Benintendi both homered. Boston won the second game of the series, 6–2, as Mookie Betts had two home runs, including one to leadoff the game. Eduardo Rodríguez got his 17th win of the season, and Brandon Workman got his 11th save. The final game of the series was a 2–1 win by the Twins. The Red Sox had the tying run on base in the ninth inning, but Devers was thrown out at the plate trying to score on a two-out double that J. D. Martinez hit off of the Green Monster. Boston's run came on a Betts homer that hit Pesky's Pole.

Red Sox lost the series 1–2 (12–10 runs)

September 6–9, vs. New York Yankees

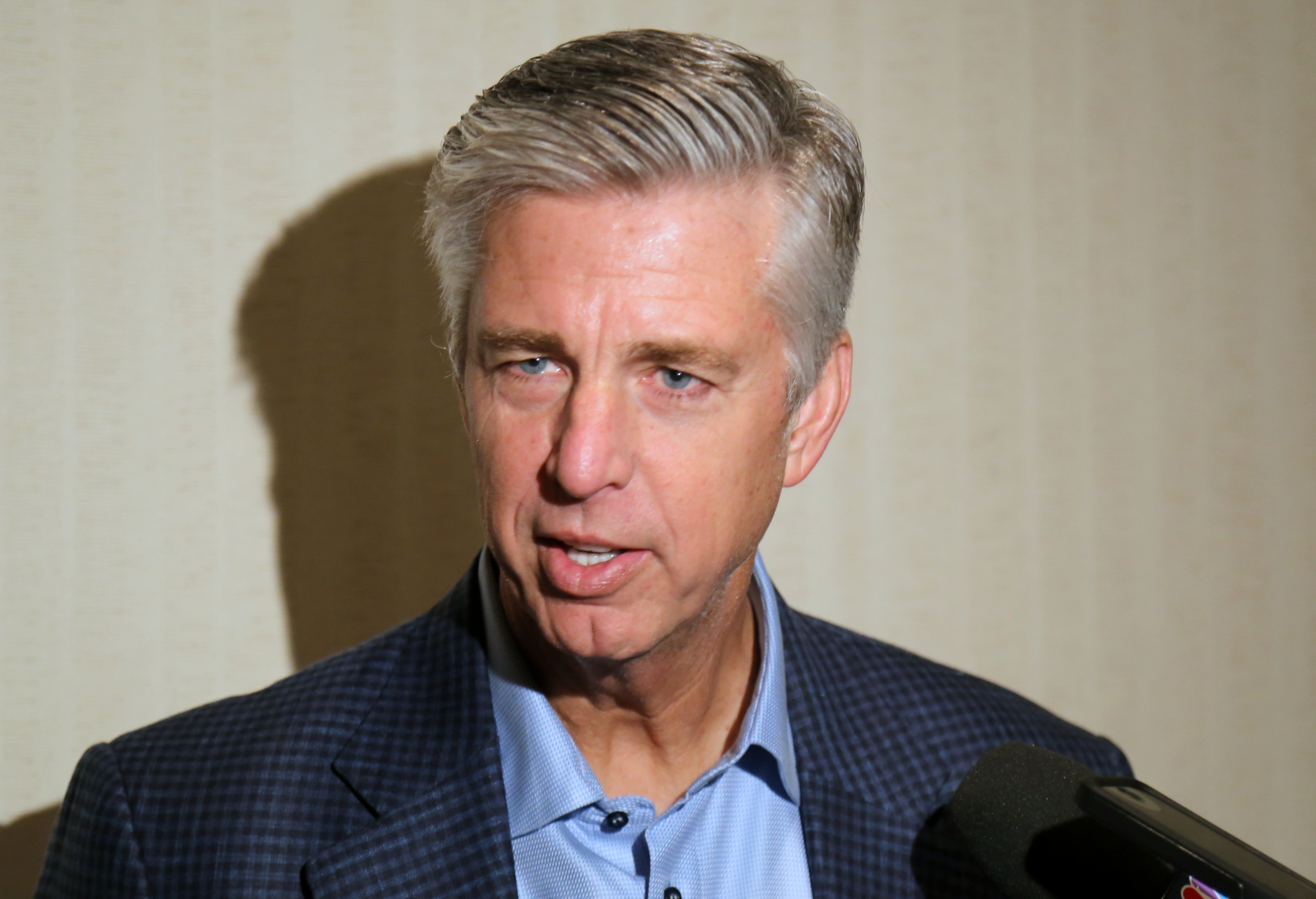
Dave Dombrowski was dismissed shortly after the September 8 loss to the Yankees.

Jhoulys Chacín got the start in the first game of this four-game series, retiring all six batters he faced while striking out four. Powered mainly by a four-run fourth inning, Boston went on to win, 6–1, while using seven pitchers. Mitch Moreland hit his 15th home run of the season. The Yankees won the series' second game, 5–1, also mainly due to a four-run fourth inning. Boston's run came on a ninth-inning homer by J. D. Martinez. New York won the third game of the series, 10–5, scoring first and never trailing. Jackie Bradley Jr. and Mookie Betts each homered.

Following the September 8 loss to the Yankees, which dropped the Red Sox to 76–67 on the season, the team dismissed president of baseball operations Dave Dombrowski. The team announced that baseball operations would be run by assistant general managers Brian O'Halloran, Eddie Romero, and Zack Scott on an interim basis.

The final game of the series was a 5–0 Yankees win, which eliminated the Red Sox from AL East title contention. Prior to the game, David Ortiz threw out the ceremonial first pitch.

Red Sox lost the series 1–3 (12–21 runs)

September 10–12, at Toronto Blue Jays

The first game of the series was a 4–3 win by Toronto, after Boston had held leads of 1–0 and 3–2. Mookie Betts hit his 28th home run of the season. The second game of the series was an 8–0 win by the Blue Jays, extending Boston's losing streak to five games. The Red Sox only collected two hits, one each by Brock Holt and Rafael Devers. Boston won the final game of the series, 7–4, with Blue Jay starter and former Red Sox pitcher Clay Buchholz taking the loss. Boston used nine pitchers, with Brandon Workman notching his 12th save of the season.

Red Sox lost the series 1–2 (10–16 runs)

September 14–15, at Philadelphia Phillies

In this weekend inter-league series, Boston won the first game, 2–1. The winning run scored on a sacrifice fly by Andrew Benintendi in the top of the ninth inning. Boston also won the second game, 6–3. Christian Vázquez had a third-inning grand slam and a sixth inning solo homer.

Red Sox won the series 2–0 (8–4 runs)

September 17–19, vs. San Francisco Giants

The opening game of this three-game inter-league series featured the Giants' Mike Yastrzemski, grandson of Hall of Fame inductee Carl Yastrzemski of the Red Sox; the younger Yastrzemski hit his 20th home run of the season in the fourth inning. San Francisco built a 5–1 lead through four innings, which became a 5–5 tie at the end of the sixth. With no further scoring in regulation, the game went into extra innings. The teams traded runs in the 13th inning, and the Giants pushed across a run in the 15th inning, for a 7–6 win. With a game duration of 5 hours and 54 minutes, the teams used a total of 24 pitchers, tying the major league record, and 50 players total. The second game of the series was an 11–3 win by the Giants, the 2,000th win of manager Bruce Bochy's career. Rafael Devers hit his 30th home run of the season, while Jackie Bradley Jr. hit his 20th. Before the game, a ceremonial first pitch was thrown by Carl Yastrzemski to his grandson Mike. The Red Sox won the final game of the series, 5–4, with Eduardo Rodríguez recording his 18th win of the season. All of Boston's run came in the first two innings. Xander Bogaerts was 2-for-4 with three RBIs, in his first MLB game as a designated hitter.

Red Sox lost the series 1–2 (14–22 runs)

September 20–23, at Tampa Bay Rays

The opening game of this four-game series was won in 11 innings by the Rays, 5–4. With the Rays defending Mitch Moreland's at-bats with four outfielders, he hit two home runs and had all four RBIs for the Red Sox. A win by the Cleveland Indians while Boston's game was in progress eliminated the Red Sox from postseason contention. The second game of the series was again a 5–4 Rays win in 11 innings. Tied 3–3 after nine innings, Moreland homered for Boston to take a 4–3 lead in the top of the 11th. With no outs and a runner on second in the bottom of the 11th, Nate Lowe hit a walk-off home run to give Tampa Bay the win. Xander Bogaerts and Rafael Devers both homered during regulation for Boston. The third game of the series was a 7–4 Boston win, with Nathan Eovaldi getting the win after holding the Rays to three runs in six innings. Christian Vázquez hit his 22nd home run of the season, going 3-for-5 with three RBIs. The final game of the series was won by the Rays, 7–4. The Red Sox led, 4–0, midway through the fourth inning; Tampa Bay then scored six in the bottom of the fourth, and held Boston scoreless for the rest of the game.

Red Sox lost the series 1–3 (19–21 runs)

September 24–26, at Texas Rangers

The opener of this three-game series was won by the Red Sox, 12–10, with Eduardo Rodríguez earning his 19th win of the season, despite allowing seven runs in five innings. Mookie Betts hit his 29th home run of the season, giving the team 238 homers for the season, tying the franchise record set by the 2003 Red Sox. Boston won the second game of the series, 10–3, with starter Rick Porcello improving his record on the season to 14–12. A third-inning home run by Christian Vázquez was the team's 239th of the season, setting a new franchise record. Mitch Moreland and Rafael Devers added homers in later innings. The final game of the series was won by the Rangers, 7–5. Jackie Bradley Jr. and Chris Owings each homered for the Red Sox. This was Boston's final road game of the season; the team had an overall 46–35 record in away games.

Red Sox won the series 2–1 (27–20 runs)

September 27–29, vs. Baltimore Orioles

The final series of the season began with a 4–1 Baltimore win, as Boston's only run was driven in by Xander Bogaerts in the ninth inning. Baltimore also won the second game of the series, 9–4. Bogaerts and J. D. Martinez each homered for Boston. The final game of the season was a 5–4 Red Sox win, as Rafael Devers notched his 200th hit of the season. Eduardo Rodríguez, going for his 20th win of the season, had to settle for a no decision. Mookie Betts scored the winning run in the bottom of the ninth inning, scoring all the way from first on a ground ball that went into right field.

Red Sox lost the series 1–2 (10–17 runs)

== Season standings ==
=== American League East ===
AL East
Team	W	L	Pct.	GB	Home	Road
New York Yankees	103	59	.636	—	57‍–‍24	46‍–‍35
Tampa Bay Rays	96	66	.593	7	48‍–‍33	48‍–‍33
Boston Red Sox	84	78	.519	19	38‍–‍43	46‍–‍35
Toronto Blue Jays	67	95	.414	36	35‍–‍46	32‍–‍49
Baltimore Orioles	54	108	.333	49	25‍–‍56	29‍–‍52

=== American League Wild Card ===
Division leaders
Team	W	L	Pct.
Houston Astros	107	55	.660
New York Yankees	103	59	.636
Minnesota Twins	101	61	.623

Wild Card teams (Top 2 teams qualify for postseason)
Team	W	L	Pct.	GB
Oakland Athletics	97	65	.599	+1
Tampa Bay Rays	96	66	.593	—
Cleveland Indians	93	69	.574	3
Boston Red Sox	84	78	.519	12
Texas Rangers	78	84	.481	18
Chicago White Sox	72	89	.447	23½
Los Angeles Angels	72	90	.444	24
Seattle Mariners	68	94	.420	28
Toronto Blue Jays	67	95	.414	29
Kansas City Royals	59	103	.364	37
Baltimore Orioles	54	108	.333	42
Detroit Tigers	47	114	.292	48½

=== Red Sox team leaders ===
Batting
Batting average†	Rafael Devers	.311
Home runs	J. D. Martinez	36
RBIs	Xander Bogaerts	117
Runs scored	Mookie Betts	135
Stolen bases	Mookie Betts	16
Pitching
Wins	Eduardo Rodríguez	19
ERA‡	Eduardo Rodríguez	3.81
WHIP‡	Eduardo Rodríguez	1.33
Strikeouts	Chris Sale	218
Saves	Brandon Workman	16

† Minimum 3.1 plate appearances per team games played
AVG qualified batters: Benintendi, Betts, Bogaerts, Bradley, Devers, Martinez, Vázquez
‡ Minimum 1 inning pitched per team games played
ERA & WHIP qualified pitchers: Porcello, Rodríguez

=== Record against opponents ===
2019 American League record Source: MLB Standings Grid – 2019
Team	BAL	BOS	CWS	CLE	DET	HOU	KC	LAA	MIN	NYY	OAK	SEA	TB	TEX	TOR	NL
Baltimore	—	7–12	3–3	3–4	3–4	2–4	3–3	4–3	0–6	2–17	1–6	3–4	7–12	1–6	8–11	7–13
Boston	12–7	—	5–2	3–3	5–2	2–4	5–1	4–3	3–3	5–14	4–3	4–3	7–12	4–3	11–8	10–10
Chicago	3–3	2–5	—	11–8	12–6	4–3	9–10	2–5	6–13	4–3	1–5	2–4	2–4	4–3	4–3	6–14
Cleveland	4–3	3–3	8–11	—	18–1	3–4	12–7	6–0	10–9	4–3	1–5	5–1	1–6	4–3	6–1	8–12
Detroit	4–3	2–5	6–12	1–18	—	1–6	10–9	3–3	5–14	3–3	1–6	1–6	2–4	0–6	3–4	5–15
Houston	4–2	4–2	3–4	4–3	6–1	—	5–1	14–5	3–4	4–3	11–8	18–1	3–4	13–6	4–2	11–9
Kansas City	3–3	1–5	10–9	7–12	9–10	1–5	—	2–4	5–14	2–5	2–5	2–5	3–4	2–5	1–6	9–11
Los Angeles	3–4	3–4	5–2	0–6	3–3	5–14	4–2	—	1–5	2–5	6–13	10–9	3–4	9–10	6–1	12–8
Minnesota	6–0	3–3	13–6	9–10	14–5	4–3	14–5	5–1	—	2–4	3–4	5–2	5–2	6–1	4–3	8–12
New York	17–2	14–5	3–4	3–4	3–3	3–4	5–2	5–2	4–2	—	2–4	6–1	12–7	3–3	11–8	12–8
Oakland	6–1	3–4	5–1	5–1	6–1	8–11	5–2	13–6	4–3	4–2	—	10–9	4–3	13–6	0–6	11–9
Seattle	4–3	3–4	4–2	1–5	6–1	1–18	5–2	9–10	2–5	1–6	9–10	—	2–4	8–11	4–2	9–11
Tampa Bay	12–7	12–7	4–2	6–1	4–2	4–3	4–3	4–3	2–5	7–12	3–4	4–2	—	3–3	13–6	14–6
Texas	6–1	3–4	3–4	3–4	6–0	6–13	5–2	10–9	1–6	3–3	6–13	11–8	3–3	—	3–3	9–11
Toronto	11–8	8–11	3–4	1–6	4–3	2–4	6–1	1–6	3–4	8–11	6–0	2–4	6–13	3–3	—	3–17

Red Sox vs. National League
Team	NL West					
Team	ARI	COL	LAD	SDP	SFG	PHI
Boston	1–2	3–1	1–2	2–1	1–2	2–2

== Roster ==
2019 Boston Red Sox
Roster
Pitchers: 32 Matt Barnes; 70 Ryan Brasier; 54 Colten Brewer; 48 Andrew Cashner; 43 Jhoulys Chacín; 17 Nathan Eovaldi; 37 Heath Hembree; 63 Darwinzon Hernández; 61 Brian Johnson; 71 Trevor Kelley; 65,56 Travis Lakins; 22 Rick Porcello; 66 Bobby Poyner; 10 David Price; 31 Erasmo Ramírez; 57 Eduardo Rodríguez; 41 Chris Sale; 73 Mike Shawaryn; 67 Josh Smith; 72 Josh Taylor; 47 Tyler Thornburg; 76 Héctor Velázquez; 64 Marcus Walden; 65 Ryan Weber; 44 Brandon Workman; 35 Steven Wright	Catchers: 68 Juan Centeno; 3 Sandy León; 23 Blake Swihart; 7 Christian Vázquez; Infielders: 2 Xander Bogaerts; 23 Michael Chavis; 11 Rafael Devers; 40 Marco Hernández; 12 Brock Holt; 5 Tzu-Wei Lin; 18 Mitch Moreland; 36 Eduardo Núñez; 36 Chris Owings; 25 Steve Pearce; 15 Dustin Pedroia; 59 Sam Travis	Outfielders: 16 Andrew Benintendi; 50 Mookie Betts; 19 Jackie Bradley Jr.; 47 Gorkys Hernández; 28 J. D. Martinez	Manager: 20 Alex Cora; Coaches: 86 Brian Bannister (assistant pitching); 58 Andy Barkett (assistant hitting); 53 Craig Bjornson (bullpen/catching); 87 Mike Brenly (bullpen catcher); 52 Carlos Febles (third base); 82 Tom Goodwin (first base/outfield); 51 Tim Hyers (hitting); 60 Dana LeVangie (pitching); 88 Mani Martinez (bullpen catcher); 30 Ron Roenicke (bench); 84 Ramón Vázquez (coach)

=== MLB debuts ===
Red Sox players who made their MLB debuts during the 2019 regular season:

- April 20: Michael Chavis
- April 23: Darwinzon Hernández and Travis Lakins
- May 29: Josh Taylor
- June 7: Mike Shawaryn
- July 2: Trevor Kelley

== Player stats ==
=== Batting ===
Note: G = Games played; AB = At bats; R = Runs; H = Hits; 2B = Doubles; 3B = Triples; HR = Home runs; RBI = Runs batted in; SB = Stolen bases; BB = Walks; AVG = Batting average; SLG = Slugging average

Player	G	AB	R	H	2B	3B	HR	RBI	SB	BB	AVG	SLG
Rafael Devers	156	647	129	201	54	4	32	115	8	48	.311	.555
Xander Bogaerts	155	614	110	190	52	0	33	117	4	76	.309	.555
Mookie Betts	150	597	135	176	40	5	29	80	16	97	.295	.524
J. D. Martinez	146	575	98	175	33	2	36	105	2	72	.304	.557
Andrew Benintendi	138	541	72	144	40	5	13	68	10	59	.266	.431
Jackie Bradley Jr.	147	494	69	111	28	3	21	62	8	56	.225	.421
Christian Vázquez	138	482	66	133	26	1	23	72	4	33	.276	.477
Michael Chavis	95	347	46	88	10	1	18	58	2	31	.254	.444
Mitch Moreland	91	298	48	75	17	1	19	58	1	34	.252	.507
Brock Holt	87	259	38	77	14	2	3	31	1	28	.297	.402
Sandy León	65	172	14	33	3	0	5	19	0	13	.192	.297
Eduardo Núñez	60	167	13	38	7	0	2	20	5	4	.228	.305
Marco Hernández	61	148	18	37	7	0	2	11	1	3	.250	.338
Sam Travis	59	144	17	31	4	1	6	16	2	11	.215	.382
Steve Pearce	29	89	9	16	4	0	1	9	0	7	.180	.258
Gorkys Hernández	20	49	5	7	1	2	0	2	1	5	.143	.245
Chris Owings	26	45	4	7	2	0	1	5	1	6	.156	.267
Blake Swihart	12	26	4	6	1	0	1	4	0	2	.231	.385
Tzu-Wei Lin	13	20	3	4	2	0	0	1	1	2	.200	.300
Dustin Pedroia	6	20	1	2	0	0	0	1	0	1	.100	.100
Juan Centeno	7	15	0	2	0	0	0	2	1	2	.133	.133
Pitcher totals	162	21	2	1	0	0	0	1	0	0	.048	.048
Team totals	162	5770	901	1554	345	27	245	857	68	590	.269	.466

=== Pitching ===
Note: W = Wins; L = Losses; ERA = Earned run average; G = Games pitched; GS = Games started; SV = Saves; IP = Innings pitched; H = Hits allowed; R = Runs allowed; ER = Earned runs allowed; BB = Walks allowed; SO = Strikeouts

Player	W	L	ERA	G	GS	SV	IP	H	R	ER	BB	SO
Eduardo Rodríguez	19	6	3.81	34	34	0	203.1	195	88	86	75	213
Rick Porcello	14	12	5.52	32	32	0	174.1	198	114	107	45	143
Chris Sale	6	11	4.40	25	25	0	147.1	123	80	72	37	218
David Price	7	5	4.28	22	22	0	107.1	109	57	51	32	128
Marcus Walden	9	2	3.81	70	0	2	78.0	61	38	33	32	76
Brandon Workman	10	1	1.88	73	0	16	71.2	29	18	15	45	104
Nathan Eovaldi	2	1	5.99	23	12	0	67.2	72	46	45	35	70
Matt Barnes	5	4	3.78	70	0	4	64.1	51	29	27	38	110
Héctor Velázquez	1	4	5.43	34	8	0	56.1	58	40	34	28	49
Ryan Brasier	2	4	4.85	62	0	7	55.2	51	33	30	21	61
Colten Brewer	1	2	4.12	58	0	0	54.2	59	26	25	34	52
Andrew Cashner	2	5	6.20	25	6	1	53.2	58	39	37	29	42
Josh Taylor	2	2	3.04	52	1	0	47.1	40	17	16	16	62
Ryan Weber	2	4	5.09	18	3	0	40.2	48	25	23	8	29
Brian Johnson	1	3	6.02	21	7	0	40.1	53	29	27	23	31
Heath Hembree	1	0	3.86	45	0	2	39.2	34	20	17	18	46
Josh Smith	0	3	5.81	18	2	1	31.0	36	22	20	8	29
Darwinzon Hernández	0	1	4.45	29	1	0	30.1	27	18	15	26	57
Travis Lakins Sr.	0	1	3.86	16	3	0	23.1	23	11	10	10	18
Mike Shawaryn	0	0	9.74	14	0	0	20.1	26	22	22	13	29
Tyler Thornburg	0	0	7.71	16	0	0	18.2	21	16	16	10	22
Jhoulys Chacín	0	2	7.36	6	5	0	14.2	16	12	12	7	21
Bobby Poyner	0	1	6.94	13	1	0	11.2	10	9	9	5	11
Trevor Kelley	0	3	8.64	10	0	0	8.1	9	8	8	5	6
Steven Wright	0	1	8.53	6	0	0	6.1	11	6	6	4	5
Erasmo Ramírez	0	0	12.00	1	0	0	3.0	4	4	4	1	1
Eduardo Núñez	0	0	9.00	1	0	0	1.0	1	1	1	0	0
Team totals	84	78	4.70	162	162	33	1471.0	1423	828	768	605	1633

=== Transactions ===
Notable transactions of/for players on the 40-man roster during the 2019 regular season:

- April 16: Catcher Blake Swihart was designated for assignment. He was traded to the Arizona Diamondbacks three days later, for minor league outfielder Marcus Wilson.
- July 10: Pitcher Tyler Thornburg was released.
- July 13: Boston acquired pitcher Andrew Cashner (and cash considerations) from the Baltimore Orioles in exchange for minor league position players Noelberth Romero and Elio Prado.
- July 15: Eduardo Núñez was designated for assignment; he was released on July 20.
- September 1: The team activated pitcher Jhoulys Chacín when rosters expanded; Chacín had been signed to a minor league contract on August 31, after being released by the Milwaukee Brewers on August 26.

=== Amateur draft ===
Boston's top ten selections in the 2019 MLB draft, which started on June 3, are listed below. The team did not have a first-round pick, due to being more than $40 million over the MLB luxury tax threshold.

Round	Pick	Player	Position	B/T	Class	School	Signing date
2	43	Cameron Cannon	Shortstop	R/R	4YR JR	Arizona	June 12, 2019
2	69	Matthew Lugo	Shortstop	R/R	HS SR	Carlos Beltrán Baseball Academy (PR)	June 19, 2019
3	107	Ryan Zeferjahn	Pitcher	R/R	4YR JR	Kansas	June 12, 2019
4	137	Noah Song	Pitcher	R/R	4YR SR	Navy	July 6, 2019
5	167	Jaxx Groshans	Catcher	R/R	4YR JR	Kansas	June 12, 2019
6	197	Chris Murphy	Pitcher	L/L	4YR SR	University of San Diego	June 12, 2019
7	227	Brock Bell	Pitcher	R/R	JC J3	State College of Florida, Manatee–Sarasota	June 12, 2019
8	257	Wil Dalton	Center fielder	R/R	4YR JR	Florida	June 12, 2019
9	287	Cody Scroggins	Pitcher	R/R	4YR SR	Arkansas	June 28, 2019
10	317	Stephen Scott	Outfielder	L/R	4YR SR	Vanderbilt	July 4, 2019

== Game log ==
Red Sox Win	Red Sox Loss	Game postponed	Eliminated from Playoff Race	Clinched Playoff Spot	Clinched Division

2019 Boston Red Sox Season Game Log: 84–78 (Home: 38–43; Away: 46–35)
March / April: 13–17 (Home: 7–7; Away: 6–10)

#	Date	Opponent	Score	Win	Loss	Save	Stadium	Attendance	Record	Box/ Streak
1	Mar 28	@ Mariners	4–12	Gonzales (2–0)	Sale (0–1)	—	T-Mobile Park	45,601	0–1	L1
2	Mar 29	@ Mariners	7–6	Johnson (1–0)	Strickland (0–1)	Barnes (1)	T-Mobile Park	29,002	1–1	W1
3	Mar 30	@ Mariners	5–6	Leake (1–0)	Rodríguez (0–1)	Rumbelow (1)	T-Mobile Park	34,928	1–2	L1
4	Mar 31	@ Mariners	8–10	LeBlanc (1–0)	Porcello (0–1)	Bradford (1)	T-Mobile Park	33,391	1–3	L2
5	Apr 1	@ Athletics	0–7	Brooks (1–0)	Price (0–1)	—	Oakland Coliseum	12,417	1–4	L3
6	Apr 2	@ Athletics	0–1	Fiers (2–1)	Sale (0–2)	Treinen (3)	Oakland Coliseum	12,721	1–5	L4
7	Apr 3	@ Athletics	6–3	Barnes (1–0)	Rodney (0–1)	Brasier (1)	Oakland Coliseum	14,207	2–5	W1
8	Apr 4	@ Athletics	3–7	Anderson (2–0)	Rodríguez (0–2)	—	Oakland Coliseum	15,095	2–6	L1
9	Apr 5	@ Diamondbacks	8–15	Godley (1–1)	Porcello (0–2)	—	Chase Field	48,338	2–7	L2
10	Apr 6	@ Diamondbacks	4–5	Holland (1–0)	Brewer (0–1)	—	Chase Field	35,969	2–8	L3
11	Apr 7	@ Diamondbacks	1–0	Walden (1–0)	Kelly (1–1)	Brasier (2)	Chase Field	31,565	3–8	W1
12	Apr 9	Blue Jays	5–7	Shoemaker (3–0)	Sale (0–3)	Giles (3)	Fenway Park	36,179	3–9	L1
13	Apr 11	Blue Jays	7–6	Walden (2–0)	Giles (0–1)	—	Fenway Park	36,510	4–9	W1
14	Apr 12	Orioles	6–4	Rodríguez (1–2)	Hess (1–2)	Brasier (3)	Fenway Park	33,664	5–9	W2
15	Apr 13	Orioles	5–9	Cashner (3–1)	Porcello (0–3)	—	Fenway Park	35,823	5–10	L1
16	Apr 14	Orioles	4–0	Price (1–1)	Means (1–2)	—	Fenway Park	36,023	6–10	W1
17	Apr 15	Orioles	1–8	Straily (1–1)	Velázquez (0–1)	—	Fenway Park	35,860	6–11	L1
18	Apr 16	@ Yankees	0–8	Paxton (2–2)	Sale (0–4)	—	Yankee Stadium	45,008	6–12	L2
19	Apr 17	@ Yankees	3–5	Kahnle (1–0)	Workman (0–1)	Chapman (3)	Yankee Stadium	44,106	6–13	L3
20	Apr 19	@ Rays	6–4	Workman (1–1)	Castillo (0–2)	Brasier (4)	Tropicana Field	21,343	7–13	W1
21	Apr 20	@ Rays	6–5	Barnes (2–0)	Alvarado (0–1)	Brasier (5)	Tropicana Field	22,940	8–13	W2
22	Apr 21	@ Rays	4–3 (11)	Walden (3–0)	Alvarado (0–2)	Brasier (6)	Tropicana Field	18,740	9–13	W3
—	Apr 22	Tigers	Postponed (rain). Makeup date April 23.							
23	Apr 23 (1)	Tigers	4–7	Boyd (2–1)	Brewer (0–2)	—	Fenway Park	30,015	9–14	L1
24	Apr 23 (2)	Tigers	2–4	Turnbull (1–2)	Velázquez (0–2)	Greene (11)	Fenway Park	30,578	9–15	L2
25	Apr 24	Tigers	11–4	Rodríguez (2–2)	Ross (1–3)	—	Fenway Park	31,763	10–15	W1
26	Apr 25	Tigers	7–3	Porcello (1–3)	Zimmermann (0–4)	—	Fenway Park	34,165	11–15	W2
—	Apr 26	Rays	Postponed (rain). Makeup date June 8.							
27	Apr 27	Rays	1–2	Morton (3–0)	Price (1–2)	Pagán (3)	Fenway Park	34,773	11–16	L1
28	Apr 28	Rays	2–5	Glasnow (5–0)	Sale (0–5)	Castillo (3)	Fenway Park	33,823	11–17	L2
29	Apr 29	Athletics	9–4	Brasier (1–0)	Montas (4–2)	Barnes (2)	Fenway Park	30,866	12–17	W1
30	Apr 30	Athletics	5–1	Porcello (2–3)	Brooks (2–3)	—	Fenway Park	31,754	13–17	W2

May: 16–11 (Home: 7–5; Away: 9–6)

#	Date	Opponent	Score	Win	Loss	Save	Stadium	Attendance	Record	Box/ Streak
31	May 1	Athletics	7–3	Walden (4–0)	Fiers (2–3)	—	Fenway Park	33,708	14–17	W3
32	May 2	@ White Sox	4–6	Fulmer (1–1)	Brasier (1–1)	—	Guaranteed Rate Field	15,118	14–18	L1
33	May 3	@ White Sox	6–1	Sale (1–5)	López (2–4)	—	Guaranteed Rate Field	17,504	15–18	W1
34	May 4	@ White Sox	15–2	Rodríguez (3–2)	Bañuelos (2–1)	—	Guaranteed Rate Field	30,068	16–18	W2
35	May 5	@ White Sox	9–2	Workman (2–1)	Herrera (0–2)	—	Guaranteed Rate Field	36,553	17–18	W3
36	May 6	@ Orioles	1–4	Means (4–3)	Smith (0–1)	Givens (4)	Camden Yards	11,042	17–19	L1
37	May 7	@ Orioles	8–5	Walden (5–0)	Kline (1–1)	Barnes (3)	Camden Yards	10,703	18–19	W1
38	May 8	@ Orioles	2–1 (12)	Brasier (2–1)	Ramírez (0–1)	Hembree (1)	Camden Yards	12,451	19–19	W2
39	May 10	Mariners	14–1	Rodríguez (4–2)	Swanson (1–4)	—	Fenway Park	33,731	20–19	W3
40	May 11	Mariners	9–5	Porcello (3–3)	Hernández (1–4)	—	Fenway Park	36,024	21–19	W4
41	May 12	Mariners	11–2	Velázquez (1–2)	Gonzales (5–2)	—	Fenway Park	33,069	22–19	W5
42	May 14	Rockies	4–5 (11)	Dunn (1–0)	Brasier (2–2)	Davis (7)	Fenway Park	35,804	22–20	L1
43	May 15	Rockies	6–5 (10)	Workman (3–1)	Bettis (1–3)	—	Fenway Park	37,032	23–20	W1
44	May 17	Astros	1–3	Harris (1–0)	Porcello (3–4)	Osuna (11)	Fenway Park	35,558	23–21	L1
45	May 18	Astros	3–7	James (1–0)	Velázquez (1–3)		Fenway Park	36,887	23–22	L2
46	May 19	Astros	4–3	Walden (6–0)	Valdez (1–2)	Workman (1)	Fenway Park	35,796	24–22	W1
47	May 20	@ Blue Jays	12–2	Price (2–2)	Jackson (0–1)	—	Rogers Centre	26,794	25–22	W2
48	May 21	@ Blue Jays	3–10	Stroman (2–6)	Rodríguez (4–3)	—	Rogers Centre	14,407	25–23	L1
49	May 22	@ Blue Jays	6–5 (13)	Hembree (1–0)	Cordero (0–1)	—	Rogers Centre	18,285	26–23	W1
50	May 23	@ Blue Jays	8–2	Weber (1–0)	Gaviglio (3–1)	—	Rogers Centre	36,526	27–23	W2
51	May 24	@ Astros	3–4	Miley (5–2)	Sale (1–6)	Osuna (13)	Minute Maid Park	35,606	27–24	L1
52	May 25	@ Astros	3–4	Osuna (3–0)	Barnes (2–1)	—	Minute Maid Park	40,722	27–25	L2
53	May 26	@ Astros	4–1	Rodríguez (5–3)	Verlander (8–2)	Walden (1)	Minute Maid Park	41,502	28–25	W1
54	May 27	Indians	12–5	Porcello (4–4)	Rodríguez (1–5)	—	Fenway Park	37,113	29–25	W2
55	May 28	Indians	5–7	Wittgren (2–0)	Lakins (0–1)	Hand (14)	Fenway Park	32,984	29–26	L1
56	May 29	Indians	9–14	Bieber (4–2)	Weber (1–1)	Hand (15)	Fenway Park	34,824	29–27	L2
—	May 30	Yankees	Postponed (rain). Makeup date August 3.							
57	May 31	@ Yankees	1–4	Happ (5–3)	Sale (1–7)	Chapman (16)	Yankee Stadium	45,556	29–28	L3

June: 15–12 (Home: 6–10; Away: 9–2)

#	Date	Opponent	Score	Win	Loss	Save	Stadium	Attendance	Record	Box/ Streak
58	Jun 1	@ Yankees	3–5	Green (1–2)	Porcello (4–5)	Chapman (17)	Yankee Stadium	46,307	29–29	L4
59	Jun 2	@ Yankees	8–5	Price (3–2)	Sabathia (3–2)	Workman (2)	Yankee Stadium	40,068	30–29	W1
60	Jun 4	@ Royals	8–3	Rodríguez (6–3)	Barlow (1–2)	—	Kauffman Stadium	13,184	31–29	W2
61	Jun 5	@ Royals	8–0	Sale (2–7)	Junis (4–6)	—	Kauffman Stadium	15,523	32–29	W3
62	Jun 6	@ Royals	7–5	Brewer (1–2)	Duffy (3–3)	Barnes (4)	Kauffman Stadium	19,928	33–29	W4
63	Jun 7	Rays	1–5	Chirinos (7–2)	Porcello (4–6)	—	Fenway Park	36,803	33–30	L1
64	Jun 8 (1)	Rays	2–9	Yarbrough (5–2)	Smith (0–2)	—	Fenway Park	35,564	33–31	L2
65	Jun 8 (2)	Rays	5–1	Price (4–2)	Poche (0–1)	—	Fenway Park	37,048	34–31	W1
66	Jun 9	Rays	1–6	Snell (4–5)	Rodríguez (6–4)	—	Fenway Park	34,643	34–32	L1
67	Jun 10	Rangers	3–4 (11)	Chavez (2–1)	Brasier (2–3)	Martin (2)	Fenway Park	34,422	34–33	L2
68	Jun 11	Rangers	5–9	Jurado (4–2)	Hernández (0–1)	—	Fenway Park	35,121	34–34	L3
69	Jun 12	Rangers	4–3	Barnes (3–1)	Chavez (2–2)	—	Fenway Park	34,330	35–34	W1
70	Jun 13	Rangers	7–6	Workman (4–1)	Fairbanks (0–1)	Smith (1)	Fenway Park	35,841	36–34	W2
71	Jun 14	@ Orioles	13–2	Rodríguez (7–4)	Ortiz (0–1)	—	Camden Yards	19,383	37–34	W3
72	Jun 15	@ Orioles	7–2	Sale (3–7)	Bundy (3–8)	—	Camden Yards	30,050	38–34	W4
73	Jun 16	@ Orioles	8–6 (10)	Workman (5–1)	Givens (0–4)	—	Camden Yards	27,964	39–34	W5
74	Jun 17	@ Twins	2–0	Porcello (5–6)	Berríos (8–3)	Brasier (7)	Target Field	27,970	40–34	W6
75	Jun 18	@ Twins	3–4 (17)	Littell (1–0)	Johnson (1–1)	—	Target Field	25,741	40–35	L1
76	Jun 19	@ Twins	9–4	Rodríguez (8–4)	Gibson (7–4)	—	Target Field	31,835	41–35	W1
77	Jun 21	Blue Jays	7–5 (10)	Workman (6–1)	Romano (0–1)	—	Fenway Park	36,911	42–35	W2
78	Jun 22	Blue Jays	7–8	Kingham (3–1)	Barnes (3–2)	Giles (12)	Fenway Park	36,712	42–36	L1
79	Jun 23	Blue Jays	1–6	Stroman (5–9)	Porcello (5–7)	—	Fenway Park	36,495	42–37	L2
80	Jun 24	White Sox	6–5	Workman (7–1)	Fry (1–3)	—	Fenway Park	36,117	43–37	W1
81	Jun 25	White Sox	6–3	Price (5–2)	Ruiz (0–1)	Workman (3)	Fenway Park	34,740	44–37	W2
82	Jun 26	White Sox	7–8	Colomé (3–1)	Barnes (3–3)	—	Fenway Park	36,823	44–38	L1
83	Jun 29	Yankees	13–17	Green (2–2)	Wright (0–1)	—	London Stadium†	59,659	44–39	L2
84	Jun 30	Yankees	8–12	Ottavino (3–2)	Walden (6–1)	—	London Stadium†	59,059	44–40	L3
†The Red Sox were the home team against the Yankees in a two-game series at London Stadium in the inaugural 2019 MLB London Series.

July: 15–10 (Home: 7–6; Away: 8–4)

#	Date	Opponent	Score	Win	Loss	Save	Stadium	Attendance	Record	Box/ Streak
85	Jul 2	@ Blue Jays	10–6	Price (6–2)	Thornton (2–6)	—	Rogers Centre	18,415	45–40	W1
86	Jul 3	@ Blue Jays	3–6	Waguespack (1–0)	Sale (3–8)	Giles (13)	Rogers Centre	16,883	45–41	L1
87	Jul 4	@ Blue Jays	8–7	Workman (8–1)	Giles (1–2)	—	Rogers Centre	22,217	46–41	W1
88	Jul 5	@ Tigers	9–6	Rodríguez (9–4)	Carpenter (1–5)	—	Comerica Park	27,181	47–41	W2
89	Jul 6	@ Tigers	10–6	Porcello (6–7)	Zimmermann (0–6)	—	Comerica Park	28,114	48–41	W3
90	Jul 7	@ Tigers	6–3	Price (7–2)	Soto (0–3)	Hembree (2)	Comerica Park	23,187	49–41	W4
91	Jul 12	Dodgers	8–1	Rodríguez (10–4)	Maeda (7–6)	—	Fenway Park	36,579	50–41	W5
92	Jul 13	Dodgers	2–11	Stripling (4–3)	Sale (3–9)	—	Fenway Park	36,607	50–42	L1
93	Jul 14	Dodgers	4–7 (12)	Floro (4–2)	Velázquez (1–4)	Kelly (1)	Fenway Park	36,700	50–43	L2
94	Jul 15	Blue Jays	10–8	Porcello (7–7)	Thornton (3–7)	Workman (4)	Fenway Park	35,616	51–43	W1
95	Jul 16	Blue Jays	4–10	Shafer (1–1)	Cashner (9–4)	—	Fenway Park	36,341	51–44	L1
96	Jul 17	Blue Jays	5–4	Rodríguez (11–4)	Sanchez (3–14)	Workman (5)	Fenway Park	34,853	52–44	W1
97	Jul 18	Blue Jays	5–0	Sale (4–9)	Pannone (2–4)	—	Fenway Park	35,357	53–44	W2
98	Jul 19	@ Orioles	2–11	Means (8–5)	Price (7–3)	—	Camden Yards	18,243	53–45	L1
99	Jul 20	@ Orioles	17–6	Porcello (8–7)	Eshelman (0–2)	—	Camden Yards	21,339	54–45	W1
100	Jul 21	@ Orioles	0–5	Wojciechowski (1–3)	Cashner (9–5)	—	Camden Yards	18,173	54–46	L1
101	Jul 22	@ Rays	9–4	Rodríguez (12–4)	Beeks (5–1)	—	Tropicana Field	10,966	55–46	W1
102	Jul 23	@ Rays	5–4	Sale (5–9)	Poche (2–4)	Walden (2)	Tropicana Field	15,876	56–46	W2
103	Jul 24	@ Rays	2–3	Morton (12–3)	Price (7–4)	Pagán (7)	Tropicana Field	24,161	56–47	L1
104	Jul 25	Yankees	19–3	Porcello (9–7)	Tanaka (7–6)	—	Fenway Park	37,591	57–47	W1
105	Jul 26	Yankees	10–5	Cashner (10–5)	Paxton (5–6)	—	Fenway Park	37,095	58–47	W2
106	Jul 27	Yankees	9–5	Rodríguez (13–4)	Sabathia (5–6)	—	Fenway Park	36,862	59–47	W3
107	Jul 28	Yankees	6–9	Germán (13–2)	Sale (5–10)	—	Fenway Park	37,429	59–48	L1
108	Jul 30	Rays	5–6	Kolarek (4–3)	Taylor (0–1)	Pagán (8)	Fenway Park	36,412	59–49	L2
109	Jul 31	Rays	5–8	Yarbrough (10–3)	Porcello (9–8)	Roe (1)	Fenway Park	33,046	59–50	L3

August: 14–13 (Home: 7–6; Away: 7–7)

#	Date	Opponent	Score	Win	Loss	Save	Stadium	Attendance	Record	Box/ Streak
110	Aug 1	Rays	4–9	McKay (2–1)	Cashner (10–6)	—	Fenway Park	37,225	59–51	L4
111	Aug 2	@ Yankees	2–4	Paxton (6–6)	Rodríguez (13–5)	Chapman (28)	Yankee Stadium	46,932	59–52	L5
112	Aug 3 (1)	@ Yankees	2–9	Germán (14–2)	Sale (5–11)	—	Yankee Stadium	46,625	59–53	L6
113	Aug 3 (2)	@ Yankees	4–6	Kahnle (3–0)	Barnes (3–4)	Chapman (29)	Yankee Stadium	48,101	59–54	L7
114	Aug 4	@ Yankees	4–7	Happ (9–6)	Price (7–5)	Green (2)	Yankee Stadium	47,267	59–55	L8
115	Aug 5	Royals	7–5	Porcello (10–8)	Montgomery (1–5)	Workman (6)	Fenway Park	33,636	60–55	W1
116	Aug 6	Royals	2–6	Junis (7–10)	Cashner (10–7)	—	Fenway Park	36,360	60–56	L1
117	Aug 7†	Royals	5–4 (10)	Taylor (1–1)	Lovelady (0–2)	—	Fenway Park	32,453	61–56	W1
118	Aug 8	Angels	3–0	Sale (6–11)	Peters (2–1)	Workman (7)	Fenway Park	34,744	62–56	W2
119	Aug 9	Angels	16–4	Walden (7–1)	Barría (4–6)	—	Fenway Park	36,650	63–56	W3
120	Aug 10	Angels	4–12	Cole (2–3)	Porcello (10–9)	—	Fenway Park	36,390	63–57	L1
121	Aug 11	Angels	4–5 (10)	Robles (4–0)	Weber (1–2)	—	Fenway Park	36,709	63–58	L2
122	Aug 12	@ Indians	5–6	Hand (6–3)	Walden (7–2)	—	Progressive Field	24,770	63–59	L3
123	Aug 13	@ Indians	7–6 (10)	Workman (9–1)	Wittgren (4–1)	Cashner (1)	Progressive Field	26,662	64–59	W1
124	Aug 14	@ Indians	5–1	Eovaldi (1–0)	Bieber (12–5)	—	Progressive Field	29,535	65–59	W2
125	Aug 16	Orioles	9–1	Porcello (11–9)	Brooks (2–7)	—	Fenway Park	37,213	66–59	W3
126	Aug 17	Orioles	4–0	Rodríguez (14–5)	Wojciechowski (2–6)	—	Fenway Park	36,744	67–59	W4
127	Aug 18	Orioles	13–7	Walden (8–2)	Fry (1–5)	—	Fenway Park	36,350	68–59	W5
128	Aug 20	Phillies	2–3	Nola (12–3)	Johnson (1–2)	Neris (22)	Fenway Park	37,712	68–60	L1
129	Aug 21	Phillies	2–5	Hughes (4–5)	Porcello (11–10)	Neris (23)	Fenway Park	37,077	68–61	L2
—	Aug 22†	Royals	Completion of suspended game from August 7				Fenway Park	16,441	—	—
130	Aug 23	@ Padres	11–0	Rodríguez (15–5)	Paddack (7–7)	—	Petco Park	42,904	69–61	W1
131	Aug 24	@ Padres	5–4	Barnes (4–4)	Yates (0–4)	Workman (8)	Petco Park	42,625	70–61	W2
132	Aug 25	@ Padres	1–3	Lucchesi (9–7)	Johnson (1–3)	Yates (37)	Petco Park	38,026	70–62	L1
133	Aug 27	@ Rockies	10–6	Porcello (12–10)	Garcia (0–1)	—	Coors Field	44,101	71–62	W1
134	Aug 28	@ Rockies	7–4	Rodríguez (16–5)	Lambert (2–5)	Workman (9)	Coors Field	40,801	72–62	W2
135	Aug 30	@ Angels	7–6 (15)	Cashner (11–7)	Cahill (3–9)	—	Angel Stadium	39,788	73–62	W3
136	Aug 31	@ Angels	4–10	García (2–1)	Brasier (2–4)	—	Angel Stadium	43,036	73–63	L1
† The August 7 game was suspended in the top of the 10th inning due to rain, and was subsequently completed on August 22. All game statistics are considered by MLB to have occurred on the original game date of August 7. August 22 attendance information is as announced by the Red Sox.

September: 11–15 (Home: 4–9; Away: 7–6)

#	Date	Opponent	Score	Win	Loss	Save	Stadium	Attendance	Record	Box/ Streak
137	Sep 1	@ Angels	4–3	Weber (2–2)	Heaney (3–4)	Workman (10)	Angel Stadium	39,382	74–63	W1
138	Sep 3	Twins	5–6	Thorpe (2–1)	Porcello (12–11)	Rogers (23)	Fenway Park	35,129	74–64	L1
139	Sep 4	Twins	6–2	Rodríguez (17–5)	Berríos (11–8)	Workman (11)	Fenway Park	35,218	75–64	W1
140	Sep 5	Twins	1–2	Pérez (10–6)	Cashner (11–8)	Rogers (24)	Fenway Park	32,632	75–65	L1
141	Sep 6	Yankees	6–1	Walden (9–2)	Germán (17–4)	—	Fenway Park	36,162	76–65	W1
142	Sep 7	Yankees	1–5	Happ (12–8)	Weber (2–3)	—	Fenway Park	36,619	76–66	L1
143	Sep 8	Yankees	5–10	Green (3–4)	Porcello (12–12)	—	Fenway Park	35,681	76–67	L2
144	Sep 9	Yankees	0–5	Paxton (13–6)	Rodríguez (17–6)	—	Fenway Park	35,884	76–68	L3
145	Sep 10	@ Blue Jays	3–4	Shafer (2–1)	Taylor (1–2)	Giles (19)	Rogers Centre	17,819	76–69	L4
146	Sep 11	@ Blue Jays	0–8	Thornton (5–9)	Kelley (0–1)	—	Rogers Centre	14,463	76–70	L5
147	Sep 12	@ Blue Jays	7–4	Taylor (2–2)	Buchholz (1–5)	Workman (12)	Rogers Centre	17,420	77–70	W1
148	Sep 14	@ Phillies	2–1	Barnes (5–4)	Neris (3–6)	Workman (13)	Citizens Bank Park	40,688	78–70	W2
149	Sep 15	@ Phillies	6–3	Porcello (13–12)	Vargas (6–8)	Workman (14)	Citizens Bank Park	39,061	79–70	W3
150	Sep 17	Giants	6–7 (15)	Rodríguez (6–9)	Kelley (0–2)	—	Fenway Park	35,925	79–71	L1
151	Sep 18	Giants	3–11	Samardzija (11–12)	Chacín (3–11)	—	Fenway Park	35,697	79–72	L2
152	Sep 19	Giants	5–4	Rodríguez (18–6)	Bumgarner (9–9)	Workman (15)	Fenway Park	35,816	80–72	W1
153	Sep 20	@ Rays	4–5 (11)	Castillo (4–8)	Kelley (0–3)	—	Tropicana Field	17,117	80–73	L1
154	Sep 21	@ Rays	4–5 (11)	Castillo (5–8)	Smith (0–3)	—	Tropicana Field	18,179	80–74	L2
155	Sep 22	@ Rays	7–4	Eovaldi (2–0)	Yarbrough (11–5)	—	Tropicana Field	17,946	81–74	W1
156	Sep 23	@ Rays	4–7	Pruitt (3–0)	Poyner (0–1)	Poche (2)	Tropicana Field	8,779	81–75	L1
157	Sep 24	@ Rangers	12–10	Rodríguez (19–6)	Jurado (7–11)	Workman (16)	Globe Life Park	23,341	82–75	W1
158	Sep 25	@ Rangers	10–3	Porcello (14–12)	Allard (4–2)	—	Globe Life Park	29,290	83–75	W2
159	Sep 26	@ Rangers	5–7	Minor (14–10)	Weber (2–4)	Leclerc (14)	Globe Life Park	24,612	83–76	L1
160	Sep 27	Orioles	1–4	Wojciechowski (4–8)	Eovaldi (2–1)	—	Fenway Park	34,533	83–77	L2
161	Sep 28	Orioles	4–9	Means (12–11)	Chacín (3–12)	—	Fenway Park	36,414	83–78	L3
162	Sep 29	Orioles	5–4	Workman (10–1)	Tate (0–2)	—	Fenway Park	35,427	84–78	W1

=== Grand slams ===
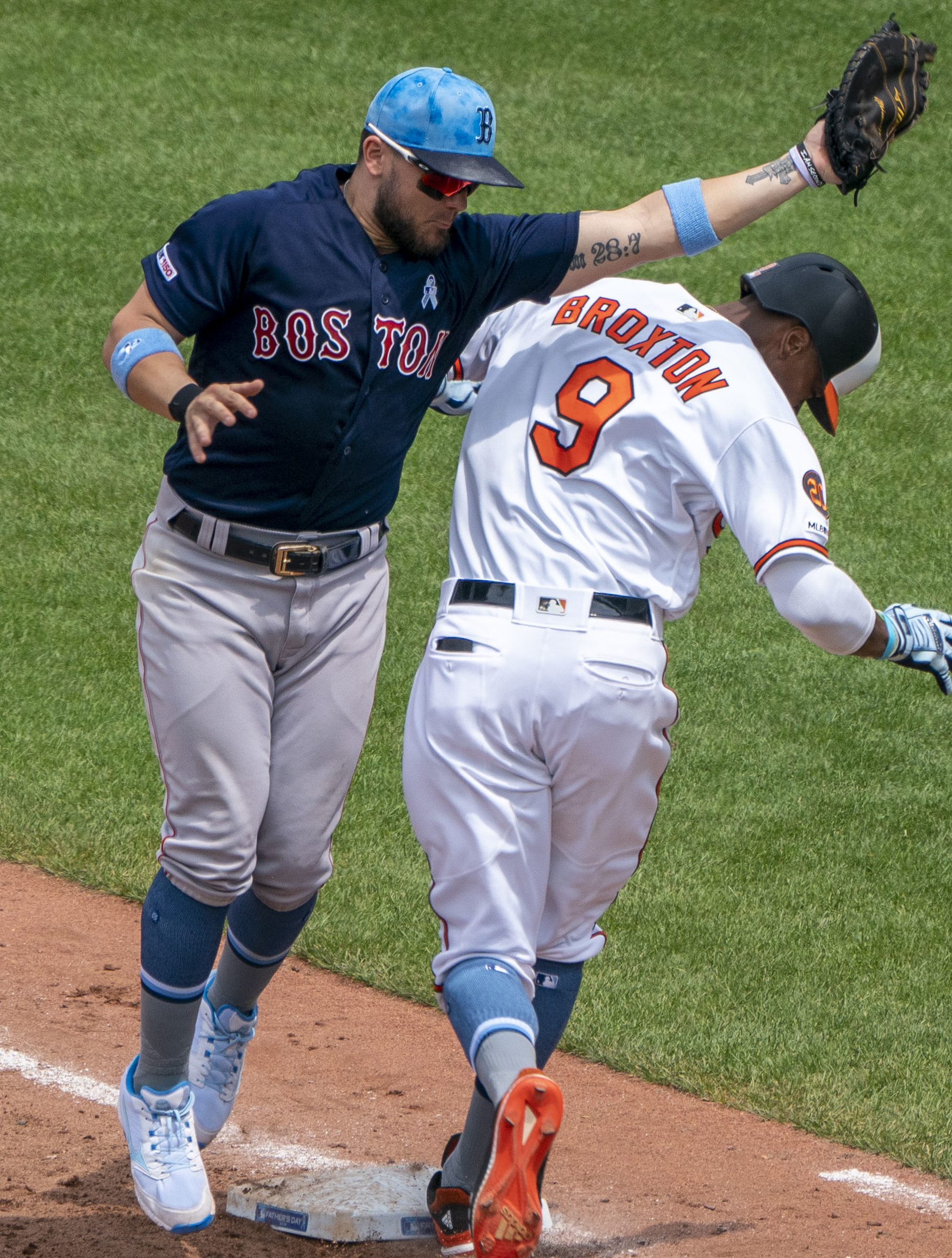
Michael Chavis (left) hit his first MLB grand slam on July 15.

No.	Date	Red Sox batter	H/A	Pitcher	Opposing team
1	April 20	Andrew Benintendi	Away	Charlie Morton	Tampa Bay Rays
2	May 5	Xander Bogaerts	Away	Juan Minaya	Chicago White Sox
3	July 15	Michael Chavis	Home	Trent Thornton	Toronto Blue Jays
4	September 15	Christian Vázquez	Away	Jason Vargas	Philadelphia Phillies

=== Ejections ===
No.	Date	Red Sox personnel	H/A	Opposing team
1	June 11	Andrew Benintendi	Home	Texas Rangers
2	June 11	Alex Cora	Home	Texas Rangers
3	July 25	Brock Holt	Home	New York Yankees
4	August 3	Alex Cora	Away	New York Yankees
5	August 3	Chris Sale	Away	New York Yankees

== Awards and honors ==
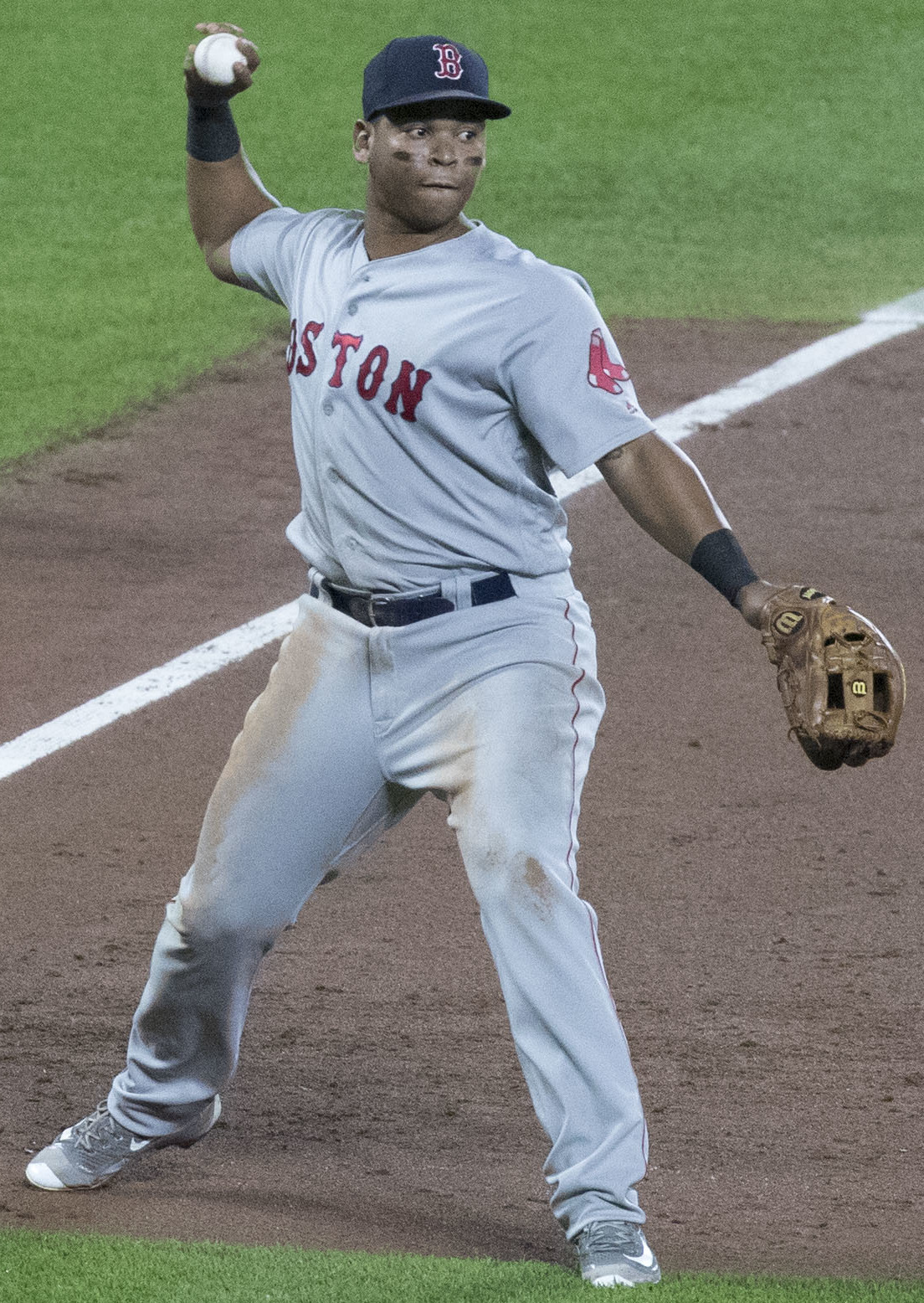
Rafael Devers was named AL Player of the Month for May.

Recipient	Award	Date awarded	Ref.
Rafael Devers	AL Player of the Month (May)	June 3, 2019	
Michael Chavis	AL Rookie of the Month (May)	June 3, 2019	
Mookie Betts	All-Star Reserve OF	June 30, 2019	
J. D. Martinez	All-Star Reserve DH†	June 30, 2019	
Xander Bogaerts	All-Star Reserve SS	July 3, 2019	
Rafael Devers	AL Player of the Week (Aug. 12–18)	August 19, 2019	
Brandon Workman	AL Reliever of the Month (September)	September 30, 2019	
Mookie Betts	AL Gold Glove RF	November 3, 2019	
Mookie Betts	Silver Slugger Award OF	November 7, 2019	
Xander Bogaerts	Silver Slugger Award SS	November 7, 2019	
Xander Bogaerts	All-MLB Team SS (first team)	November 25, 2019	
Mookie Betts	All-MLB Team OF (second team)	November 25, 2019	

† Martinez was subsequently named to start the All-Star Game due to an injury to Hunter Pence.

Jackie Bradley Jr., Andrew Benintendi, and Christian Vazquez were also finalists for Rawlings Gold Glove Awards. Eduardo Rodríguez finished sixth in Cy Young Award voting. In AL MVP voting, Xander Bogaerts finished fifth, Mookie Betts eighth, Rafael Devers 12th, and J. D. Martinez was tied for 21st.

Jackie Bradley Jr.'s over-the-wall catch of a Trey Mancini drive on May 8 was selected as number one on the list of MLB Network's Top 100 Plays of 2019, while number two on the list was an over-the-wall catch by Stevie Wilkerson on a drive that Bradley hit on September 29 at Fenway Park.

== Farm system ==
Level	Team	League	Manager
AAA	Pawtucket Red Sox	International League	Billy McMillon
AA	Portland Sea Dogs	Eastern League	Joe Oliver
A-Advanced	Salem Red Sox	Carolina League	Corey Wimberly
A	Greenville Drive	South Atlantic League	Iggy Suarez
A-Short Season	Lowell Spinners	New York–Penn League	Luke Montz
Rookie	GCL Red Sox	Gulf Coast League	Tom Kotchman
Rookie	DSL Red Sox 1	Dominican Summer League	Ozzie Chavez
Rookie	DSL Red Sox 2	Dominican Summer League	Fernando Tatís
