= 2020 Boston Red Sox season =

Major League Baseball season

2020 Boston Red Sox
- League: American League
- Division: East
- Ballpark: Fenway Park
- City: Boston, Massachusetts
- Record: 24–36 (.400)
- Divisional place: 5th
- Owners: John W. Henry (Fenway Sports Group)
- President: Sam Kennedy
- Chief baseball officer: Chaim Bloom
- General manager: Brian O'Halloran
- Manager: Ron Roenicke
- Television: NESN: Dave O'Brien (play-by-play) with Jerry Remy & Dennis Eckersley (color)
- Radio: WEEI-FM / Boston Red Sox Radio Network: Joe Castiglione with Will Flemming, Sean McDonough and Lou Merloni
- Stats: ESPN.com; Baseball Reference

The 2020 Boston Red Sox season was the 120th season in the team's history, and their 109th season at Fenway Park. The team entered spring training with a new leader in baseball operations, Chaim Bloom, and a new field manager, Ron Roenicke.

On March 12, 2020, MLB announced that because of the ongoing COVID-19 pandemic, the start of the regular season would be delayed by at least two weeks in addition to the remainder of spring training being cancelled. Four days later, it was announced that the start of the season would be pushed back indefinitely due to the recommendation made by the CDC to restrict events of more than 50 people for eight weeks. On June 23, MLB announced that pre-season training would resume by July 1, in anticipation of a regular season of 60 games. The season was held without fans at Fenway Park due to the ongoing COVID-19 pandemic. The Red Sox began their regular season on July 24, in a home game against the Baltimore Orioles. On September 12, the team suffered its 31st loss, assuring them of finishing the season with a losing record, their first since 2015. On September 27, prior to the team's final regular season game, the Red Sox announced that Roenicke would not return as manager for the 2021 season. The team ended the season with a record of 24 wins and 36 losses, finishing in last place in the American League East division, 16 games behind the Tampa Bay Rays. Boston's .400 winning percentage was the lowest for the franchise since the 1965 Red Sox finished with a .383 winning percentage (62–100). Average television viewership for Red Sox games broadcast by NESN fell by 54% from 2019 figures, the largest drop of the 25 MLB teams reporting viewership data.

== Offseason ==
The team completed its 2019 season with interim executive leadership, as Brian O'Halloran, Eddie Romero, Zack Scott, and Raquel Ferreira oversaw baseball operations following the September 9 dismissal of Dave Dombrowski, president of baseball operations. As the season came to a close, principal owner John W. Henry and chairman Tom Werner stated that they want the team to get its payroll under the Major League Baseball luxury tax threshold. The team's 2019 payroll of $243 million was $37 million over the $206 million threshold, resulting in the team paying $13 million in luxury tax. The 2020 threshold was set at $208 million.

October–December 2019

=== October ===
- On October 2, it was reported that assistant hitting coach Andy Barkett was dismissed, which was confirmed by the team on October 8.
- On October 8, the team announced that ticket prices at Fenway Park during the 2020 season would increase an average of 1.7% from 2019 pricing.
- On October 8, the team announced that Dana LeVangie and Brian Bannister would not return as the team's pitching coach and assistant pitching coach, respectively, although both would remain with the team in other roles.
- On October 18, the team released pitcher Steven Wright, and removed Gorkys Hernández and Josh Smith from the 40-man roster, sending both outright to Pawtucket.
- On October 21, Hernández, Smith, and Chris Owings elected free agency rather than accepting assignments to Triple-A Pawtucket.
- On October 21, Peter Fatse was reportedly hired as the team's assistant hitting coach, which was officially announced on October 31.
- On October 24, analyst Bill James announced his retirement from the Red Sox.
- On October 25, the team reportedly selected Chaim Bloom as Chief Baseball Officer and Brian O'Halloran as general manager; an official announcement was made three days later, on an off-day of the 2019 World Series.
- On October 31, the following players became free agents: Andrew Cashner, Jhoulys Chacín, Brock Holt, Mitch Moreland, Steve Pearce, and Rick Porcello. The team also selected Josh Osich off waivers from the Chicago White Sox.
- On October 31, the team officially named Dave Bush pitching coach, Kevin Walker assistant pitching coach, and Peter Fatse assistant hitting coach.
- On October 31, J. D. Martinez entered a five-day period within which he could opt out of his contract (which would make him a free agent and trigger a $2.5 million payment from the Red Sox); Martinez did not opt out.

=== November ===
- On November 4, catcher Juan Centeno was removed from the 40-man roster and elected to become a free agent.
- On November 12, Tony La Russa, who had worked with the Red Sox for two years as a special assistant, was hired by the Los Angeles Angels as a senior advisor.
- On November 20, in advance of the Rule 5 draft, the Red Sox added five players to their 40-man roster: Yoan Aybar, C. J. Chatham, Bobby Dalbec, Kyle Hart, and Marcus Wilson.
- On November 27, Brian Johnson was removed from the 40-man roster and sent outright to Pawtucket.

=== December ===
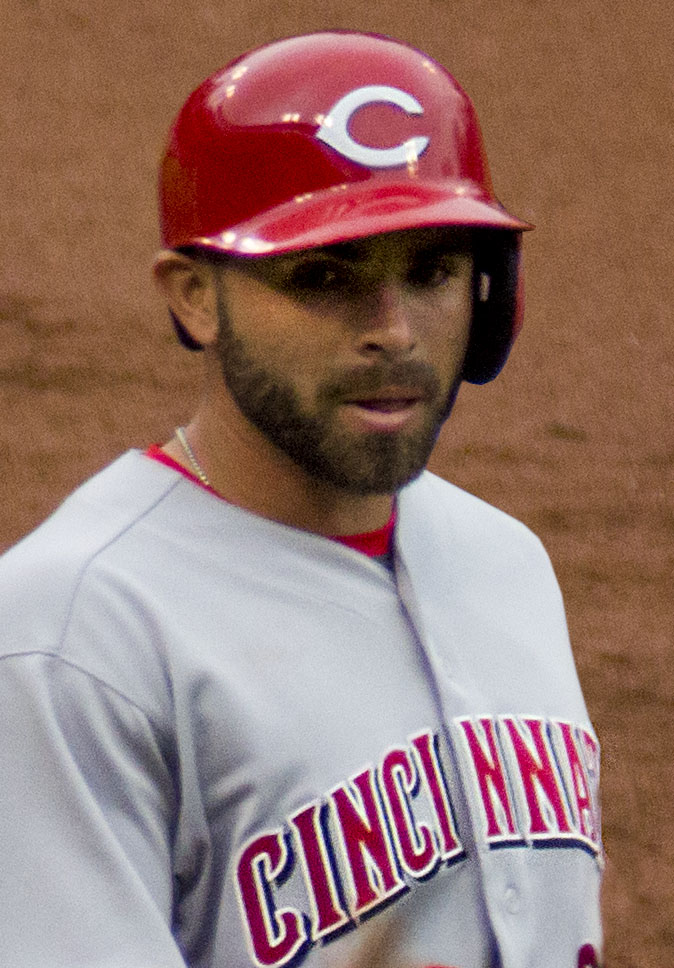
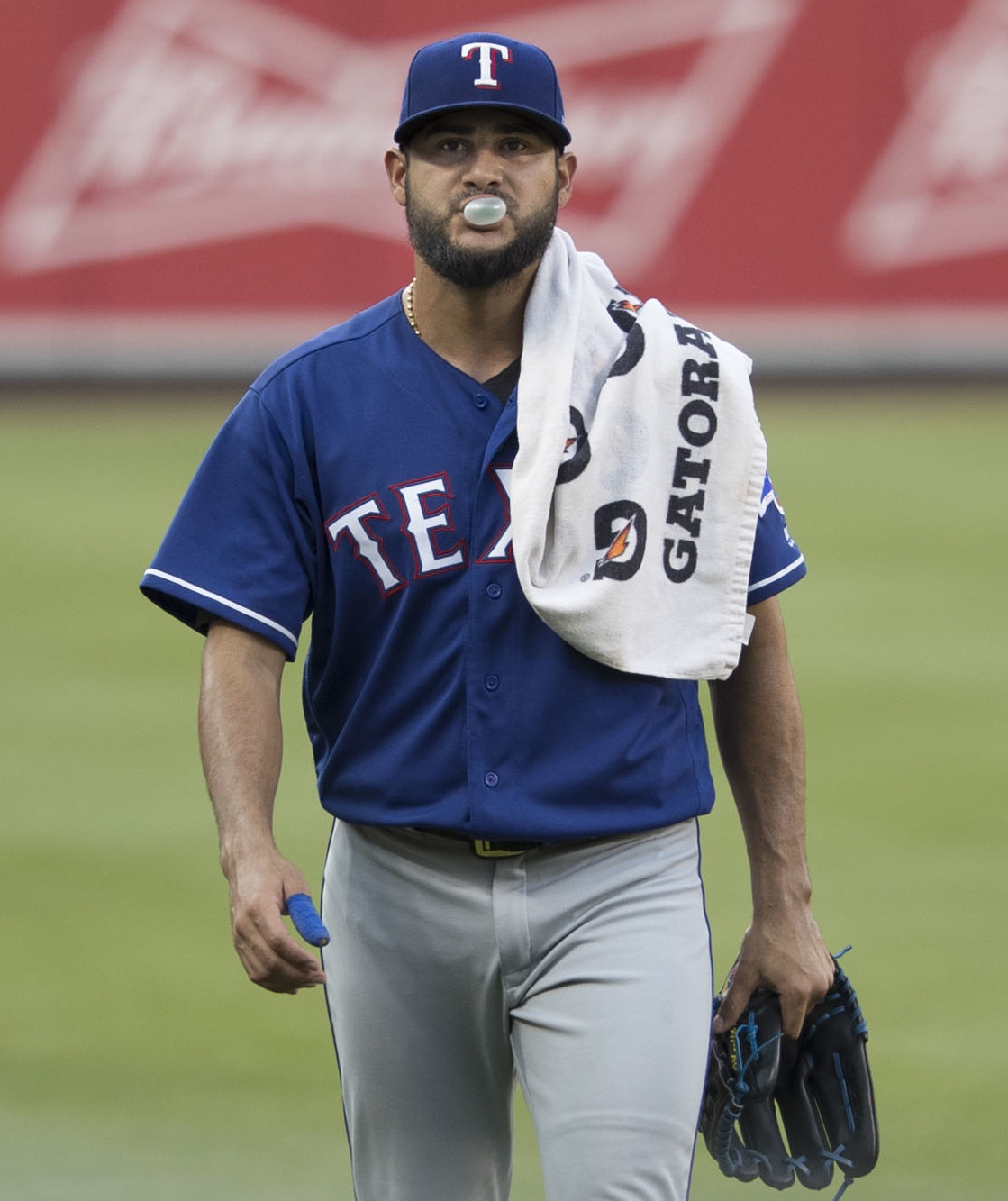
José Peraza (top) and Martín Pérez
- On December 2, Sandy León was traded to the Cleveland Indians for minor league pitcher Adenys Bautista, Trevor Kelley was claimed off of waivers by the Philadelphia Phillies, and the team declined to tender offers to Marco Hernández and Josh Osich, making them free agents.
- On December 4, Hernández and Osich were re-signed to one-year contracts.
- On December 4, former assistant pitching coach Brian Bannister left the Red Sox for a front-office position with the San Francisco Giants.
- On December 9, the team announced contract extensions for executives Raquel Ferreira, Eddie Romero, and Zack Scott, under which they each hold the title of Executive Vice President / Assistant General Manager.
- On December 10, sportswriter Nick Cafardo of The Boston Globe, who died while reporting on spring training in February 2019, was named the 2020 recipient of the J. G. Taylor Spink Award by the Baseball Writers' Association of America (BBWAA).
- On December 12, the team selected shortstop Jonathan Araúz from the Houston Astros in the Rule 5 draft. Additionally, pitcher Rick Porcello was reported to have reached agreement with the New York Mets on a one-year contract, and the Red Sox were reported to have reached one-year agreements with infielder José Peraza, formerly of the Cincinnati Reds, and pitcher Martín Pérez, formerly of the Minnesota Twins—each signing to be officially confirmed.
- On December 13, Peraza officially signed with the Red Sox.
- On December 16, Porcello officially signed with the Mets.
- On December 19, Pérez officially signed with the Red Sox.
- On December 20, the Red Sox selected pitcher Chris Mazza off of waivers from the Mets.

January–March 2020

=== January ===
- On January 2, the team signed catcher Kevin Plawecki, while Sam Travis was designated for assignment. Travis cleared waivers, and was sent outright to Triple-A Pawtucket.
- On January 7, The Athletic published a report alleging that the 2018 Red Sox broke MLB rules by using a video replay room during regular season games to decipher the signs of opposing catchers, according to three unnamed sources who were with the team that year.
- On January 10, it was reported that the team reached agreement with multiple arbitration-eligible players for the 2020 season: Matt Barnes, Mookie Betts, Jackie Bradley Jr., Heath Hembree, and Brandon Workman.
- On January 10, the Red Sox acquired pitcher Austin Brice from the Miami Marlins in exchange for minor league second baseman Angeudis Santos. In a corresponding move, Marco Hernández was designated for assignment; he was sent outright to Pawtucket on January 16.
- On January 13, MLB's findings regarding the Houston Astros sign stealing scandal were announced, including that Boston manager Alex Cora—who was bench coach for the 2017 Astros—"was the only non-player involved in the subterfuge", raising the possibility that Cora may also face discipline from MLB.
- On January 14, the Red Sox and Cora mutually agreed to part ways.
- On January 15, the team traded Sam Travis to the Texas Rangers in exchange for pitcher Jeffrey Springs; to create room on the 40-man roster, Bobby Poyner was designated for assignment.
- On January 17, the team acquired pitcher Matt Hall from the Detroit Tigers in exchange for minor league catcher Jhon Nuñez. In a corresponding move, Travis Lakins was designated for assignment.
- On January 21, Lakins was traded to the Chicago Cubs for future considerations, and Poyner was assigned outright to Triple-A Pawtucket.
- On January 28, the team re-signed Mitch Moreland to a one-year contract. To make room on the 40-man roster, Denyi Reyes was designated for assignment; he was later sent outright to Pawtucket.

=== February ===
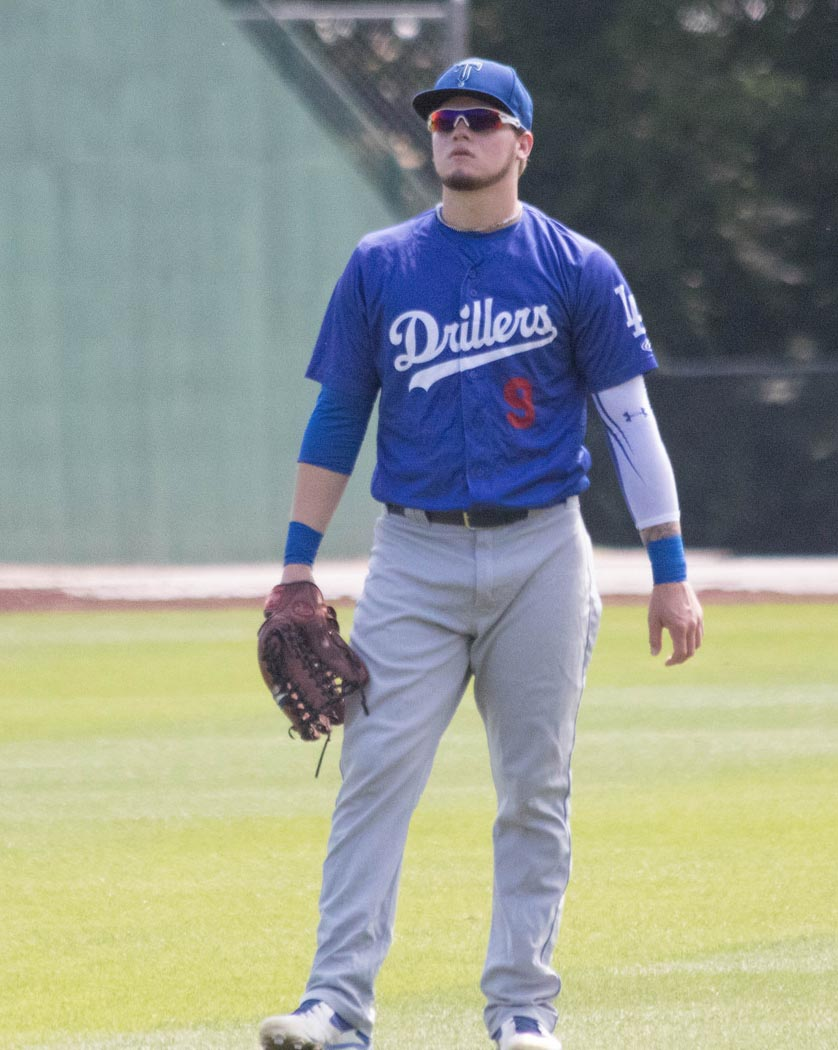
Alex Verdugo

- On February 3, "Truck Day", the team's equipment left Fenway Park for Florida.
- On February 8, the team announced signing Andrew Benintendi to a two-year, $10 million deal.
- On February 9, it was reported that the Red Sox and Los Angeles Dodgers reached agreement on a trade to send Mookie Betts, David Price, and $48 million in cash to the Dodgers in exchange for outfielder Alex Verdugo and prospects Jeter Downs and Connor Wong.
- On February 10, the above noted trade was made official.
- On February 11, the team named Ron Roenicke interim manager.
- On February 14, the team signed free agent Kevin Pillar.
- On February 19, the team signed free agent Jonathan Lucroy to a minor league contract.

Spring training

- On February 21, the Red Sox defeated the Northeastern Huskies in an exhibition game at JetBlue Park, 3–0.
- Grapefruit League games for the Red Sox began on February 22, with the team facing the Tampa Bay Rays.
- On February 22, the team named Jerry Narron bench coach.
- On February 23, the team claimed Phillips Valdez off of waivers from the Seattle Mariners; in a corresponding move, the team placed Dustin Pedroia on the 60-day injured list.

=== March ===
- On March 5, the team signed Collin McHugh to a one-year contract; in a corresponding move, Héctor Velázquez was designated for assignment.
- On March 8, Velázquez was claimed off of waivers by the Baltimore Orioles.
- On March 12, MLB cancelled remaining spring training games and announced that the start of the regular season would be delayed by at least two weeks, due to the coronavirus pandemic. Four days later, the start of the season was moved back to at least mid-May.
- On March 19, the team announced that Chris Sale would undergo Tommy John surgery.
- On March 27, roster moves were frozen until the start of the season, as part of an agreement reached between MLB and the Major League Baseball Players Association (MLBPA).
- On March 30, the team announced that Sale successfully underwent Tommy John surgery in Los Angeles.

April–July 2020

=== April ===
- On April 13, Steve Pearce (who had become a free agent at the end of October) announced his retirement.
- On April 22, commissioner Rob Manfred issued findings from the investigation about electronic sign-stealing by the 2018 Red Sox. The findings focused on the actions of the team's replay operator, who as a result was suspended for the 2020 season (including postseason) and the team forfeited their second-round selection in the 2020 MLB draft. The team subsequently removed the "interim" tag from Roenicke's title.
- On April 29, the team announced that they would be offering refunds, credits, or exchanges for tickets to home games that had been scheduled for April 2 through May 28.
- On April 30, the 2020 MLB Little League Classic, which had been scheduled for August 23 between the Red Sox and Baltimore Orioles in Williamsport, Pennsylvania, was cancelled.

=== May ===
- On May 29, the team released 22 minor league players. Later the same day, the team announced that they would not lay off or furlough any full-time workers, but those making more than $50,000 would have their pay cut.

=== June ===
- In the 2020 MLB draft, held on June 10–11, the Red Sox selected infielder Nick Yorke of Archbishop Mitty High School in San Jose, California, with their first-round pick.
- On June 20, team president Sam Kennedy advised that the team would conduct "spring training" activities at Fenway Park, if and when preseason training resumes for 2020. The most recent time the team held spring training in Massachusetts was during World War II, when the team trained at Tufts University in Medford prior to the 1943 season.
- On June 23, MLB announced that pre-season training would resume by July 1, in anticipation of a regular season of 60 games, expected to start on July 23–24.
- On June 28, the team announced a 47-player pool for the resumption of spring training. The list included 37 players on the 40-man roster (not included were Yoan Aybar, Chris Sale, and Marcus Wilson) plus 10 non-roster invitees. Sale was moved to the 45-day injured list (reduced from 60-day for 2020) later the same day.
- On June 30, it was announced that the 2020 Minor League Baseball season would not be played.

=== July ===
- On July 2, the team added Jonathan Lucroy to the preseason player pool as a non-roster invitee.
- On July 3, the team held its first "summer camp" preseason workout at Fenway Park.
- On July 4, the team announced that pitchers Darwinzon Hernández and Josh Taylor tested positive for COVID-19.
- On July 6, the MLB schedule for each team to play a 60-game regular season was announced—the Red Sox' season spans from July 24, Opening Day at home against the Baltimore Orioles, to September 27, ending the season with a road game at the Atlanta Braves.
- On July 18, manager Ron Roenicke named Nathan Eovaldi the starter for the team's opening game against Baltimore on July 24.
- On July 19, the team announced that pitcher Collin McHugh would not play during 2020, noting that McHugh's "elbow was not responding as he had hoped" following a non-surgical procedure during the offseason.
- On July 21, the team acquired pitcher Dylan Covey from the Tampa Bay Rays.
- On July 23, the team announced its 30-man roster for Opening Day; it consisted of 15 pitchers, 3 catchers, 7 infielders, and 5 outfielders (including the team's usual designated hitter, J. D. Martinez).

== Regular season ==
On July 6, MLB announced the revised 2020 regular-season schedule—"each team will play a regionally based schedule featuring 40 divisional games and 20 Interleague games against the corresponding geographical division." The Red Sox' opponents:

Red Sox 2020 Games vs. Opponents (results)
Team	Division	Game vs.	Games at	Total
Atlanta Braves	NL East	3	3	6
Baltimore Orioles	AL East	6	4	10
Miami Marlins	NL East	–	3	3
New York Mets	NL East	2	2	4
New York Yankees	AL East	3	7	10
Philadelphia Phillies	NL East	2	2	4
Tampa Bay Rays	AL East	4	6	10
Toronto Blue Jays	AL East	8†	2	10
Washington Nationals	NL East	3	–	3
Total	—	31	29	60

† The Blue Jays' home ballpark during the 2020 regular season was Sahlen Field in Buffalo, New York. One game postponed in Buffalo was played in Boston, with the Red Sox batting as the away team (counts as a home game in statistics).

Original schedule

=== Original schedule ===
Key dates of the team's original 2020 schedule, prior to impact of the COVID-19 pandemic, were as follows:

- March 26: season opener at Toronto Blue Jays
- April 2: home opener vs. Chicago White Sox
- July 13–16: All-Star break
  - July 14: All-Star Game at Dodger Stadium in Los Angeles
- August 23: 2020 MLB Little League Classic vs. Baltimore Orioles in Williamsport, Pennsylvania
- September 27: final regular season game, vs. Baltimore Orioles at Fenway Park

=== Opening Day lineup ===
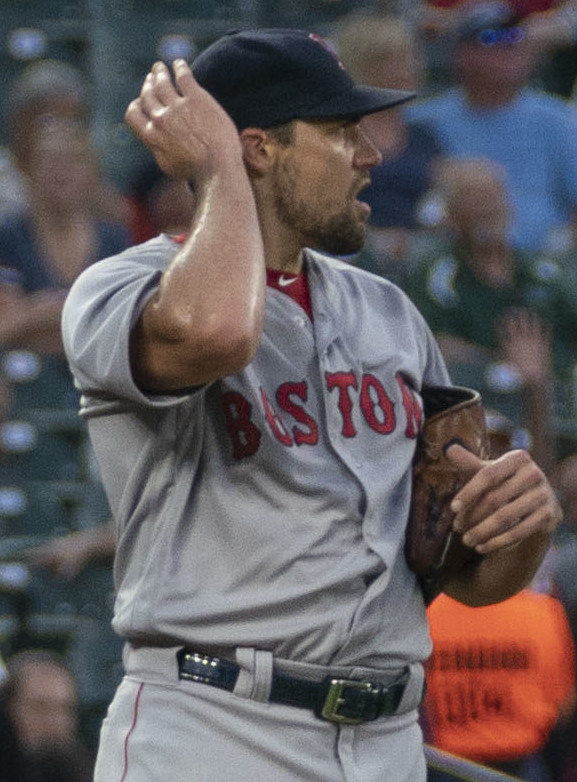
Opening Day starter Nathan Eovaldi

Order	No.	Player	Pos.
1	16	Andrew Benintendi	LF
2	28	J. D. Martinez	DH
3	11	Rafael Devers	3B
4	2	Xander Bogaerts	SS
5	5	Kevin Pillar	RF
6	7	Christian Vázquez	C
7	23	Michael Chavis	1B
8	19	Jackie Bradley Jr.	CF
9	3	José Peraza	2B
—	17	Nathan Eovaldi	P

July

=== July ===
July 24–July 26, vs. Baltimore Orioles

Boston's 2020 regular season began on July 24 in a home game against the Baltimore Orioles. The Red Sox took a 4–0 lead after three innings, a 10–0 lead through four innings, and went on to win comfortably, 13–2. Starting pitcher Nathan Eovaldi got the win, pitching six innings while allowing five hits and one run; he struck out four batters. The second game of the series was a 7–2 win by Baltimore, with Martín Pérez taking the loss in his debut game with the Red Sox. Mitch Moreland hit Boston's first home run of the season. Baltimore won the final game of the series, 7–4, with Boston starter Ryan Weber taking the loss. Christian Vázquez and Kevin Pillar hit home runs for the Red Sox.

Red Sox lost the series 1–2 (19–16 runs)

July 27–July 28, vs. New York Mets

In the opening game of a two-game home series against the Mets, New York built an early 7–1 lead through four innings, and went on to win, 7–4. Josh Osich, pitching as an opener, took the loss in his first start for the Red Sox. Mitch Moreland and Xander Bogaerts hit home runs for Boston. The second game of the series was also a Mets win, 8–3, giving the Red Sox their fourth consecutive loss. Matt Hall took the loss in his first MLB start. Kevin Pillar was 3-for-4 with two doubles.

Red Sox lost the series 0–2 (7–15 runs)

July 29–July 30, at New York Mets

Playing another two-game series against the Mets, this time in New York, Boston won the first game, 6–5. Starter Nathan Eovaldi allowed two runs on eight hits in five innings for a no decision. With a late 6–3 lead, Matt Barnes allowed a run in the eighth, and closer Brandon Workman allowed a run in the ninth. Workman, who earned his first save of the season, escaped more trouble as the Mets sent seven men to the plate in the ninth. Heath Hembree, who struck out the only batter he faced to end the seventh inning, got the win. Christian Vázquez had a home run and three RBIs. The second game of the series was also a Boston win, 4–2. Starter Martín Pérez got the win, and Workman earned his second save. Vázquez again had three RBIs, coming on two home runs.

Red Sox won the series 2–0 (10–7 runs)

July 31, at New York Yankees (start of 3-game series)

In the first game of a three-game series at Yankee Stadium, the Red Sox scored first on a Michael Chavis home run, but lost to the Yankees, 5–1. Starter Ryan Weber allowed three runs and issued four walks in 3 1/3 innings and took the loss. The Red Sox exited July with a 3–5 record.

August

=== August ===
August 1–August 2, at New York Yankees (end of 3-game series)

New York won the second game of the series, 5–2, largely due to a second-inning grand slam by Gio Urshela off of Boston starter Zack Godley, who took the loss. Kevin Pillar was the only Red Sox batter with two hits, as the team fell to 3–6. The Yankees complete the sweep on Sunday with a 9–7 victory. In a game with multiple lead changes, two home runs and five RBIs by Aaron Judge led the Yankees to the win. Boston reliever Matt Barnes, who allowed three runs in the eighth inning, took the loss. The Red Sox had three home runs; two by Xander Bogaerts and one by Rafael Devers.

Red Sox lost the series 0–3 (10–19 runs)

August 4–August 5, at Tampa Bay Rays

Boston lost the first game of a two-game series to Tampa Bay, 5–1. Starter Nathan Eovaldi took the loss, allowing four runs on six hits in five innings while striking out six batters. Boston's run came on a Mitch Moreland home run. Boston won the second game of the series, 5–0, to end their losing streak of four games. Starting pitcher Martín Pérez went five innings and got the win, holding the Rays to four hits while walking three and striking out four. Alex Verdugo and Michael Chavis each homered for the Red Sox.

Red Sox tied the series 1–1 (6–5 runs)

August 7–August 9, vs. Toronto Blue Jays

Boston won the first game of a three-game series, 5–3. Alex Verdugo had two home runs, while Mitch Moreland also homered and had three RBIs. Starting pitcher Ryan Weber allowed five hits and two runs in three innings, getting a no decision. Reliever Heath Hembree, who pitched the fourth inning, got the win. The second game of the series was won by Toronto, 2–1. Boston's run came on a second-inning RBI by Christian Vázquez; the Blue Jays tied the game in the seventh, then took the lead in the eighth. Red Sox starter Zack Godley got a no decision after four innings of work; the loss went to Marcus Walden. Boston won the third game of the series, 5–3, powered by two home runs and three RBIs from Moreland. Starter Nathan Eovaldi went six innings, striking out 10 batters and getting a no decision. Reliever Matt Barnes got the win, retiring the side in order in the top of the ninth inning, which was followed by a walk-off home run in the bottom of the ninth by Moreland.

Red Sox won the series 2–1 (11–8 runs)

August 10–August 13, vs. Tampa Bay Rays

In the opening game of a four-game series, each team used six pitchers in a nine-inning game that lasted 4 hours and 24 minutes, with Tampa Bay winning, 8–7. Jeffrey Springs, who allowed three runs in relief, took the loss. J. D. Martinez hit his first home run of the year, while Jonathan Araúz collected his first MLB hit and finished the game 3-for-4 with two RBIs. The Rays won the second game of the series, 8–2. Red Sox starter Martín Pérez, who left the game with Tampa Bay ahead by a single run, took the loss, having allowed two runs on three hits in 5 2/3 innings. Boston reliever Austin Brice allowed five runs during the Rays' six-run seventh inning. The Rays took the third game of the series, 9–5. Down 8–0, the Red Sox scored all of their runs in the eighth inning, which included the team's first grand slam of the season, by J. D. Martinez. Boston starter Zack Godley allowed eight runs on 10 hits in three innings, taking the loss. Reliever Ryan Weber held Tampa Bay to one run on five hits in six innings of work. Tampa Bay completed the sweep with a 17–8 win in the final game of the series. Boston starter Kyle Hart, making his major league debut, allowed seven runs (five earned) on seven hits and three walks in two innings of work, and took the loss. In the ninth inning, the Red Sox used infielder José Peraza and catcher Kevin Plawecki as pitchers, infielder Tzu-Wei Lin as a catcher, and catcher Christian Vázquez as a second baseman.

Red Sox lost the series 0–4 (22–42 runs)

August 14–August 17, at New York Yankees

Boston lost the opener of a four-game series to New York, 10–3, with starting pitcher Colten Brewer taking the loss. Alex Verdugo homered for the Red Sox. The Yankees took the second game of the series, 11–5, with starter Nathan Eovaldi taking the loss. Verdugo and Xander Bogaerts each homered for the Red Sox. The Red Sox lost the third game, 4–2, as the Yankees got three RBIs from first baseman Mike Ford. Starter Chris Mazza took the loss, while Kevin Pillar homered for Boston. New York completed the sweep with a 6–3 win in a rain delayed game, extending Boston's losing streak to eight games. Starter Martín Pérez took the loss after allowing three runs on two hits and three walks in three innings.

Red Sox lost the series 0–4 (13–31 runs)

August 18–August 19, vs. Philadelphia Phillies

In the first game of a two-game set, Boston held a 4–2 lead through five innings, only to give up seven runs in the top of the sixth, en route to a 13–6 defeat. Josh Taylor took the loss, allowing three runs on two hits in 2/3 of an inning. Heath Hembree allowed four runs on four hits and a walk, facing five batters without recording an out. Michael Chavis became the fourth batter in Red Sox franchise history to strike out five times in a game. The Red Sox won the second and final game of the series, 6–3, ending the losing streak at nine games. Austin Brice got the win, pitching 1 1/3 innings of scoreless relief. Rafael Devers homered and had three RBIs.

Red Sox tied the series 1–1 (12–16 runs)

August 20–August 23, at Baltimore Orioles

The Red Sox won the first game of a four-game series against the Orioles, 7–1. Started Nathan Eovaldi earned his second win of the season, holding Baltimore to one run on five hits in seven innings while striking out six batters. Xander Bogaerts and Mitch Moreland each homered. Boston next won their third game in a row, via an 8–5 win over Baltimore. Darwinzon Hernández earned the win, after pitching two innings of scoreless relief; Matt Barnes earned his first save of the season, following the trade of Brandon Workman. Bogaerts, J. D. Martinez, and Rafael Devers each homered. The third game of the series went into extra innings, with Baltimore outscoring Boston in the 10th inning, 2–1, for a 5–4 win. The Red Sox had held a 3–1 lead going into the eighth inning. Barnes took the loss, allowing two runs in one-third of an inning of relief. Jackie Bradley Jr. hit his first home run of the season. The final game of the series was again a 5–4 win by Baltimore. Starter Zack Godley took the loss after allowing three runs on two hits and five walks in 2 2/3 innings. Bradley and Kevin Pillar each homered.

Red Sox tied the series 2–2 (23–16 runs)

August 25–August 27, at Toronto Blue Jays in Buffalo, New York

The Red Sox played in Buffalo for the first time since July 6, 1917, when they defeated the minor league Buffalo Bisons in an exhibition game, 9–7. Playing again in Buffalo during 2020 due to the COVID-19 pandemic, Boston defeated Toronto by the same score, 9–7, in the first game of a scheduled three-game series. The Blue Jays jumped out to an early 4–0 lead, and led 6–3 before the Red Sox scored six runs in the sixth inning. Phillips Valdéz, who pitched two innings of scoreless relief, got his first MLB win. Rafael Devers had three RBIs. Toronto won the second game of the series, 9–1. Boston's only run came in the fourth inning on a Mitch Moreland home run. Starter Colten Brewer took the loss. The final game of the series was postponed, one of various games in professional sports not played following the shooting of Jacob Blake.

Red Sox tied the series 1–1 (10–16 runs)

August 28–August 30, vs. Washington Nationals

Washington won the opener of a three-game series, 10–2. Starter Martín Pérez allowed six runs on eight hits and took the loss. Boston won the second game of the series, 5–3. Starter Chris Mazza allowed six hits and three runs in 2 1/3 innings, with a no decision. Ryan Brasier, one of six relief pitchers, got the win, with Matt Barnes (baseball) getting the save. Xander Bogaerts and Kevin Pillar each homered. Boston also won the final game of the series, 9–5. The win went to reliever Josh Osich, who pitched 1 1/3 scoreless innings, after starter Zack Godley allowed five runs on eight hits in 4 2/3 innings. Rafael Devers had two home runs, while Bogaerts and Bobby Dalbec each homered. The game was Dalbec's MLB debut, following the trade of Mitch Moreland.

Red Sox won the series 2–1 (16–18 runs)

August 31, vs. Atlanta Braves (start of 3-game series)

The opening game of a three-game series was won by Atlanta, 6–3. Starter Colten Brewer took the loss, having allowed five runs on eight hits in four innings. Three of those runs came on a triple allowed by reliever Phillips Valdéz, who entered the game after Brewer had loaded the bases in the fifth inning. Alex Verdugo went 3-for-4 for Boston, as the Red Sox ended August with a 12–23 season record, last place in the AL East.

September

=== September ===
September 1–September 2, vs. Atlanta Braves (end of 3-game series)

Atlanta won the second game of the series, 10–3, led by three home runs and six RBIs from Ronald Acuña Jr. Boston starter Ryan Weber had a no decision, allowing two runs in four innings; the loss went to reliever Robert Stock, allowing two runs in two-thirds of an inning. In the third game of the series, Atlanta completed the sweep with a 7–5 win. The Braves' Adam Duvall had three home runs and five RBIs. Red Sox reliever Andrew Triggs took the loss after allowing three runs on five hits in three innings. Jackie Bradley Jr. homered for Boston.

Red Sox lost the series 0–3 (11–23 runs)

September 3–September 6, vs. Toronto Blue Jays

The opener of a five-game series with Toronto went to extra innings, with the Blue Jays scoring four times in the top of the 10th inning for a 6–2 win. Boston had led, 2–0, through six innings. Starter Martín Pérez held Toronto to one run on three hits through 6 2/3 innings. Reliever Phillips Valdéz took the loss. Jackie Bradley Jr. homered for the Red Sox. The next two games of the series were played as a doubleheader, each scheduled for seven innings. Toronto won the first game of the doubleheader, 8–7. Starter Zack Godley took the loss after allowing four runs on five hits in three innings. Yairo Muñoz homered for the Red Sox, in the team's fifth consecutive loss. Boston won the second game of the doubleheader, 3–2, batting as the away team since the game was originally scheduled to be played in Buffalo on August 27. Starter Chris Mazza received a no decision after holding Toronto to one run on three hits in four innings. Reliever Josh Taylor got the win, while Matt Barnes earned his fourth save of the season. The fourth game of the series was a 9–8 win for Boston. After leading 4–1 and 6–2, the Red Sox trailed, 8–7, going into the bottom of the ninth. A home run by Xander Bogaerts tied the game, and Christian Vázquez later scored the winning run after stealing second, advancing to third on a wild throw, and scoring on a ground ball hit by Muñoz. Boston also had home runs by J. D. Martinez, Bradley Jr., Bobby Dalbec, and Rafael Devers. Mike Kickham, who pitched two innings of scoreless relief, got the win, his first in MLB. Toronto won the fifth and final game of the series, 10–8. Starter Andrew Triggs had a no decision after holding the Blue Jays to one run on three hits in three innings. The loss went to reliever Matt Hall, who allowed six runs on four hits and four walks in 1 2/3 innings. The Red Sox had home runs by Bogaerts, Dalbec, Kevin Plawecki, and José Peraza.

Red Sox lost the series 2–3 (29–34 runs)

September 8, at Philadelphia Phillies (doubleheader)

In a two-game series played as a doubleheader, Boston split with Philadelphia. The first game was won by the Phillies, 6–5, as they scored two seventh-inning runs for a come-from-behind win. Boston starter Martín Pérez had a no decision, with reliever Matt Barnes getting a blown save and the loss. Rafael Devers homered twice, with Alex Verdugo and Bobby Dalbec also homering. Boston win the second game, 5–2, with starter Chris Mazza earning the win and reliever Marcus Walden getting the save. Dalbec again homered.

Red Sox tied the series 1–1 (10–8 runs)

September 10–September 13, at Tampa Bay Rays

Boston won the opener of a four-game series with Tampa Bay, 4–3. Starter Mike Kickham had a no decision, holding the Rays to two runs on three hits in four innings. Reliever Ryan Weber got the win, allowing one run in 2 1/3 innings. Matt Barnes earned his fifth save of the season. Rafael Devers and Bobby Dalbec each homered; it was Dalbec's fifth consecutive game with a home run. Tampa Bay won the second game, 11–1, after starting the game with a batting order consisting of nine left-handed hitters, a first in modern MLB history. Boston opener Andrew Triggs had a no decision, with reliever Matt Hall taking the loss after allowing four runs on six hits in 2 1/3 innings. Tampa Bay won the third game of the series, 5–4. Starter Nathan Eovaldi, returning from the injured list, allowed one run on three hits in three innings. Reliever Marcus Walden took the loss, pitching the seventh inning and allowing what proved to be the winning run. Michael Chavis and Christian Arroyo each homered. The Red Sox had six stolen bases against Rays starter Tyler Glasnow. The loss, Boston's 31st of the season, ensured a losing record and eliminated the team from division title contention. Boston won the final game of the series, 6–3. Starter Martín Pérez earned his third win of the season, with Barnes notching his sixth save. Arroyo and Christian Vázquez each homered.

Red Sox tied the series 2–2 (15–22 runs)

September 15–September 17, at Miami Marlins

Boston won the first game of a three-game series, 2–0, with pitcher Tanner Houck earning the win in his MLB debut, striking out seven batters in five scoreless innings while holding the Marlins to two hits. Matt Barnes earned his seventh save of the season. The second game of the series was a win for Miami, 8–4. Red Sox starter Mike Kickham took the loss, allowing six runs on seven hits in 2 2/3 innings. J. D. Martinez homered for Boston. The Red Sox won the final game of the series, 5–3, with starter Nathan Eovaldi earning the win, and Barnes recording his eighth save. Rafael Devers homered.

Red Sox won the series 2–1 (11–11 runs)

September 18–September 20, vs. New York Yankees

The Yankees won the first game of a three-game series, 6–5 in 12 innings. Boston had a 4–0 lead through six innings, but allowed New York to tie the game, 4–4, to force extra innings. Boston starter Martín Pérez had held New York scoreless in six innings of work, while notching seven strikeouts. Reliever Ryan Weber took the loss, while Christian Arroyo homered, and J. D. Martinez went 0-for-6 and saw his average drop below the Mendoza Line. New York won the second game, 8–0, with starter Chris Mazza taking the loss after allowing four runs on five hits in four innings. It was Boston's 34th loss yet first shutout of the season. The loss eliminated the Red Sox from playoff contention. Boston won the final game of the series, 10–2, as the win went to Tanner Houck, who held New York to one hit and one unearned run in six innings. Michael Chavis had two home runs; Martinez and Bobby Dalbec also homered.

Red Sox lost the series 1–2 (15–16 runs)

September 22–September 24, vs. Baltimore Orioles

Boston defeated Baltimore, 8–3, in the opener of a three-game series. Starting pitcher Nick Pivetta earned the win in his Red Sox debut, allowing one run on four hits in five innings while striking out eight batters. Matt Barnes earned his ninth save of the season, while Christian Vázquez homered. The second game was also a Boston win, 9–1, as starter and winning pitcher Nathan Eovaldi went six innings while allowing no runs on seven hits and striking out eight. Baltimore won the final game of the series, 13–1. Starter Martín Pérez allowed six runs on nine hits in four innings and took the loss, in Boston's final home game of the season.

Red Sox won the series 2–1 (18–17 runs)

September 25–September 27, at Atlanta Braves

The first game of the final series of the season was won by Atlanta, 8–7 in 11 innings. Starter Chris Mazza had a no decision after allowing one run on four hits in five innings. Reliever Jeffrey Springs took the loss after giving up a walk-off home run to Freddie Freeman. Jackie Bradley Jr. homered for Boston, while Atlanta's Ronald Acuña Jr. hit the longest home run of the 2020 season, at 495 feet (151 m). Boston won the middle game of the series, 8–2, with Tanner Houck notching his third win in three starts. All of Boston's runs came in the second inning, including four on a grand slam by Christian Vázquez. Bobby Dalbec also homered. Boston won the final game of the series, and of their season, 9–1. Starter Nick Pivetta got the win, holding Atlanta to one run on four hits in five innings. Bradley Jr., Xander Bogaerts, J. D. Martinez, and Jonathan Araúz each homered, as the team finished the season in last place in the AL East, with a 24–36 record.

== Season standings ==
=== American League East ===
AL East
Team	W	L	Pct.	GB	Home	Road
Tampa Bay Rays	40	20	.667	—	20‍–‍9	20‍–‍11
New York Yankees	33	27	.550	7	22‍–‍9	11‍–‍18
Toronto Blue Jays	32	28	.533	8	17‍–‍9	15‍–‍19
Baltimore Orioles	25	35	.417	15	13‍–‍20	12‍–‍15
Boston Red Sox	24	36	.400	16	11‍–‍20	13‍–‍16

=== American League Wild Card ===
Division leaders
Team	W	L	Pct.
Tampa Bay Rays	40	20	.667
Oakland Athletics	36	24	.600
Minnesota Twins	36	24	.600

Division 2nd place
Team	W	L	Pct.
Cleveland Indians	35	25	.583
New York Yankees	33	27	.550
Houston Astros	29	31	.483

Wild Card teams (Top 2 teams qualify for postseason)
Team	W	L	Pct.	GB
Chicago White Sox	35	25	.583	+3
Toronto Blue Jays	32	28	.533	—
Seattle Mariners	27	33	.450	5
Los Angeles Angels	26	34	.433	6
Kansas City Royals	26	34	.433	6
Baltimore Orioles	25	35	.417	7
Boston Red Sox	24	36	.400	8
Detroit Tigers	23	35	.397	8
Texas Rangers	22	38	.367	10

=== Red Sox team leaders ===
Batting
Batting average†	Alex Verdugo	.308
Runs scored	Xander Bogaerts; Verdugo	36
Home runs	Rafael Devers; Bogaerts	11
RBIs	Devers	43
Stolen bases	Bogaerts	8
Pitching
Wins	Nathan Eovaldi	4
Strikeouts	Nathan Eovaldi	52
ERA‡	Martín Pérez	4.50
WHIP‡	Martín Pérez	1.34
Saves	Matt Barnes	9

† Minimum 3.1 plate appearances per team games played
AVG qualified batters: Bogaerts, Bradley, Devers, Martinez, Vázquez, Verdugo
‡ Minimum 1 inning pitched per team games played
ERA & WHIP qualified pitchers: Pérez

=== Record against opponents ===
2020 American League record Source: MLB Standings Grid – 2020
Team	BAL	BOS	NYY	TB	TOR	NL
Baltimore	—	5–5	3–7	4–6	2–8	11–9
Boston	5–5	—	1–9	3–7	5–5	10–10
New York	7–3	9–1	—	2–8	5–5	10–10
Tampa Bay	6–4	7–3	8–2	—	6–4	13–7
Toronto	8–2	5–5	5–5	4–6	—	10–10

Red Sox vs. National League East
Team	ATL	MIA	NYM	PHI	WSH
Boston	2–4	2–1	2–2	2–2	2–1

== Game log ==
Revised schedules for 2020 were released on July 6. MLB scheduled the Red Sox to play a total of 60 games against nine opponents—four in the American League East and five in the National League East—involving travel to Washington, D.C. (Nationals) and five states outside of Massachusetts: Florida (Marlins and Rays), Georgia (Braves), Maryland (Orioles), New York (Mets, Yankees, and Blue Jays), and Pennsylvania (Phillies).

On July 24, it was announced that the Blue Jays would play their 2020 home games at Sahlen Field in Buffalo, New York. On August 6, MLB announced changes to several teams' schedules; changes for the Red Sox were:

- Phillies at Red Sox: August 19 game time changed from 7:05 p.m. to 1:35 p.m.
- Red Sox at Phillies: games of September 8–9 changed to a doubleheader on September 8
- Red Sox at Marlins: games of September 14–16 moved to September 15–17

Doubleheaders during the 2020 regular season consisted of two seven-inning games (with extra innings played in the event of a tie). All extra innings played during the 2020 regular season began with a runner on second base, with the runner being the player in the batting order immediately before the first batter of the inning (example: if a team's first batter in an extra inning was fifth in the order, the runner placed on second base was the player batting fourth).

Red Sox Win	Red Sox Loss	Game postponed

2020 Boston Red Sox Season Game Log: 24–36 (Home: 11–20; Away: 13–16)
July: 3–5 (Home: 1–4; Away: 2–1)

#	Date	Opponent	Score	Win	Loss	Save	Stadium	Record	Box/ Streak
1	Jul 24	Orioles	13–2	Eovaldi (1–0)	Milone (0–1)	—	Fenway Park	1–0	W1
2	Jul 25	Orioles	2–7	Cobb (1–0)	Pérez (0–1)	—	Fenway Park	1–1	L1
3	Jul 26	Orioles	4–7	LeBlanc (1–0)	Weber (0–1)	Sulser (1)	Fenway Park	1–2	L2
4	Jul 27	Mets	4–7	Wacha (1–0)	Osich (0–1)	Lugo (1)	Fenway Park	1–3	L3
5	Jul 28	Mets	3–8	Peterson (1–0)	Hall (0–1)	—	Fenway Park	1–4	L4
6	Jul 29	@ Mets	6–5	Hembree (1–0)	Wilson (0–1)	Workman (1)	Citi Field	2–4	W1
7	Jul 30	@ Mets	4–2	Pérez (1–1)	Matz (0–1)	Workman (2)	Citi Field	3–4	W2
8	Jul 31	@ Yankees	1–5	Montgomery (1–0)	Weber (0–2)	—	Yankee Stadium	3–5	L1

August: 9–18 (Home: 5–8; Away: 4–10)

#	Date	Opponent	Score	Win	Loss	Save	Stadium	Record	Box/ Streak
9	Aug 1	@ Yankees	2–5	Nelson (1–0)	Godley (0–1)	Hale (1)	Yankee Stadium	3–6	L2
10	Aug 2	@ Yankees	7–9	Ottavino (1–0)	Barnes (0–1)	Britton (3)	Yankee Stadium	3–7	L3
11	Aug 4	@ Rays	1–5	Morton (1–1)	Eovaldi (1–1)	Anderson (1)	Tropicana Field	3–8	L4
12	Aug 5	@ Rays	5–0	Pérez (2–1)	Yarbrough (0–2)	—	Tropicana Field	4–8	W1
13	Aug 7	Blue Jays	5–3	Hembree (2–0)	Roark (1–1)	Workman (3)	Fenway Park	5–8	W2
14	Aug 8	Blue Jays	1–2	Kay (1–0)	Walden (0–1)	Bass (3)	Fenway Park	5–9	L1
15	Aug 9	Blue Jays	5–3	Barnes (1–1)	Hatch (0–1)	—	Fenway Park	6–9	W1
16	Aug 10	Rays	7–8	Loup (1–0)	Springs (0–1)	Kittredge (1)	Fenway Park	6–10	L1
17	Aug 11	Rays	2–8	Curtiss (1–0)	Pérez (2–2)	—	Fenway Park	6–11	L2
18	Aug 12	Rays	5–9	Snell (1–0)	Godley (0–2)	—	Fenway Park	6–12	L3
19	Aug 13	Rays	8–17	Beeks (1–1)	Hart (0–1)	Banda (1)	Fenway Park	6–13	L4
20	Aug 14	@ Yankees	3–10	Cole (4–0)	Brewer (0–1)	—	Yankee Stadium	6–14	L5
21	Aug 15	@ Yankees	5–11	Paxton (1–1)	Eovaldi (1–2)	—	Yankee Stadium	6–15	L6
22	Aug 16	@ Yankees	2–4	Happ (1–1)	Mazza (0–1)	Britton (8)	Yankee Stadium	6–16	L7
23	Aug 17	@ Yankees	3–6	King (1–1)	Pérez (2–3)	—	Yankee Stadium	6–17	L8
24	Aug 18	Phillies	6–13	Parker (1–0)	Taylor (0–1)	—	Fenway Park	6–18	L9
25	Aug 19	Phillies	6–3	Brice (1–0)	Arrieta (1–3)	Workman (4)	Fenway Park	7–18	W1
26	Aug 20	@ Orioles	7–1	Eovaldi (2–2)	Wojciechowski (1–3)	—	Camden Yards	8–18	W2
27	Aug 21	@ Orioles	8–5	Hernández (1–0)	Means (0–2)	Barnes (1)	Camden Yards	9–18	W3
28	Aug 22	@ Orioles	4–5 (10)	Castro (1–0)	Barnes (1–2)	—	Camden Yards	9–19	L1
29	Aug 23	@ Orioles	4–5	Eshelman (2–0)	Godley (0–3)	Scott (1)	Camden Yards	9–20	L2
30	Aug 25	@ Blue Jays	9–7	Valdéz (1–0)	Font (1–3)	Barnes (2)	Sahlen Field	10–20	W1
31	Aug 26	@ Blue Jays	1–9	Yamaguchi (1–2)	Brewer (0–2)	—	Sahlen Field	10–21	L1
—	Aug 27	@ Blue Jays	Postponed (strikes due to shooting of Jacob Blake). Makeup date September 4.						
32	Aug 28	Nationals	2–10	Scherzer (3–1)	Pérez (2–4)	—	Fenway Park	10–22	L2
33	Aug 29	Nationals	5–3	Brasier (1–0)	Sánchez (1–4)	Barnes (3)	Fenway Park	11–22	W1
34	Aug 30	Nationals	9–5	Osich (1–1)	Voth (0–4)	—	Fenway Park	12–22	W2
35	Aug 31	Braves	3–6	Fried (6–0)	Brewer (0–3)	Melancon (7)	Fenway Park	12–23	L1

September: 12–13 (Home: 5–8; Away: 7–5)

#	Date	Opponent	Score	Win	Loss	Save	Stadium	Record	Box/ Streak
36	Sep 1	Braves	3–10	Anderson (2–0)	Stock (0–1)	—	Fenway Park	12–24	L2
37	Sep 2	Braves	5–7	Matzek (3–2)	Triggs (0–2)	Melancon (8)	Fenway Park	12–25	L3
38	Sep 3	Blue Jays	2–6 (10)	Dolis (2–1)	Valdéz (1–1)	—	Fenway Park	12–26	L4
39	Sep 4 (1)	Blue Jays	7–8 (7)	Cole (2–0)	Godley (0–4)	Bass (5)	Fenway Park	12–27	L5
40	Sep 4 (2)	Blue Jays†	3–2 (7)	Taylor (1–1)	Stripling (3–2)	Barnes (4)	Fenway Park	13–27	W1
41	Sep 5	Blue Jays	9–8	Kickham (1–0)	Bass (2–3)	—	Fenway Park	14–27	W2
42	Sep 6	Blue Jays	8–10	Hatch (3–1)	Hall (0–2)	Dolis (2)	Fenway Park	14–28	L1
43	Sep 8 (1)	@ Phillies	5–6 (7)	Neris (2–1)	Barnes (1–3)	—	Citizens Bank Park	14–29	L2
44	Sep 8 (2)	@ Phillies	5–2 (7)	Mazza (1–1)	Phelps (2–4)	Walden (1)	Citizens Bank Park	15–29	W1
45	Sep 10	@ Rays	4–3	Weber (1–2)	Fairbanks (4–2)	Barnes (5)	Tropicana Field	16–29	W2
46	Sep 11	@ Rays	1–11	Snell (4–1)	Hall (0–3)	—	Tropicana Field	16–30	L1
47	Sep 12	@ Rays	4–5	Glasnow (3–1)	Walden (0–2)	Castillo (4)	Tropicana Field	16–31	L2
48	Sep 13	@ Rays	6–3	Pérez (3–4)	Fairbanks (4–3)	Barnes (6)	Tropicana Field	17–31	W1
49	Sep 15	@ Marlins	2–0	Houck (1–0)	Alcántara (2–2)	Barnes (7)	Marlins Park	18–31	W2
50	Sep 16	@ Marlins	4–8	García (2–0)	Kickham (1–1)	—	Marlins Park	18–32	L1
51	Sep 17	@ Marlins	5–3	Eovaldi (3–2)	Ureña (0–2)	Barnes (8)	Marlins Park	19–32	W1
52	Sep 18	Yankees	5–6 (12)	Loáisiga (3–0)	Weber (1–3)	—	Fenway Park	19–33	L1
53	Sep 19	Yankees	0–8	Happ (2–2)	Mazza (1–2)	—	Fenway Park	19–34	L2
54	Sep 20	Yankees	10–2	Houck (2–0)	García (2–2)	—	Fenway Park	20–34	W1
55	Sep 22	Orioles	8–3	Pivetta (1–0)	Akin (1–2)	Barnes (9)	Fenway Park	21–34	W2
56	Sep 23	Orioles	9–1	Eovaldi (4–2)	Kremer (1–1)	—	Fenway Park	22–34	W3
57	Sep 24	Orioles	1–13	Cobb (2–5)	Pérez (3–5)	—	Fenway Park	22–35	L1
58	Sep 25	@ Braves	7–8 (11)	Greene (1–0)	Springs (0–2)	—	Truist Park	22–36	L2
59	Sep 26	@ Braves	8–2	Houck (3–0)	Davidson (0–1)	—	Truist Park	23–36	W1
60	Sep 27	@ Braves	9–1	Pivetta (2–0)	Smith (2–2)	—	Truist Park	24–36	W2

† In the second game on September 4, Toronto was the home team.

=== Grand slams ===
No.	Date	Red Sox batter	H/A	Pitcher	Opposing team
1	August 12	J. D. Martinez	Home	Aaron Slegers	Tampa Bay Rays
2	September 26	Christian Vázquez	Away	Tucker Davidson	Atlanta Braves

=== Ejections ===
The Red Sox did not have anyone ejected during the 2020 season.

== Roster ==
2020 Boston Red Sox
Roster
Pitchers: 32 Matt Barnes; 70 Ryan Brasier; 48 Colten Brewer; 31 Austin Brice; 46 Dylan Covey; 17 Nathan Eovaldi; 68 Zack Godley; 56 Matt Hall; 81 Kyle Hart; 37 Heath Hembree; 63 Darwinzon Hernández; 89 Tanner Houck; 74 Mike Kickham; 77 Robinson Leyer; 22 Chris Mazza; 35 Josh Osich; 54 Martín Pérez; 37 Nick Pivetta; 59 Jeffrey Springs; 79 Robert Stock; 66 Domingo Tapia; 72 Josh Taylor; 61 Andrew Triggs; 71 Phillips Valdéz; 64 Marcus Walden; 65 Ryan Weber; 44 Brandon Workman	Catchers: 73 Deivy Grullón; 12 Jonathan Lucroy; 25 Kevin Plawecki; 7 Christian Vázquez; Infielders: 36 Jonathan Araúz; 39 Christian Arroyo; 2 Xander Bogaerts; 23 Michael Chavis; 29 Bobby Dalbec; 11 Rafael Devers; 30 Tzu-Wei Lin; 18 Mitch Moreland; 3 José Peraza	Outfielders: 16 Andrew Benintendi; 19 Jackie Bradley Jr.; 28 J. D. Martinez; 60 Yairo Muñoz; 5 Kevin Pillar; 75 César Puello; 99 Alex Verdugo	Manager: 10 Ron Roenicke; Coaches: 53 Craig Bjornson (bullpen/catching); 58 Dave Bush (pitching); 62 Peter Fatse (assistant hitting); 52 Carlos Febles (third base); 82 Tom Goodwin (first base/outfield); 51 Tim Hyers (hitting); 88 Mani Martinez (bullpen catcher); 87 Jerry Narron (bench); 84 Ramón Vázquez (coach); 55 Kevin Walker (assistant pitching)

== Player stats ==
=== Batting ===
Note: G = Games played; AB = At bats; R = Runs; H = Hits; 2B = Doubles; 3B = Triples; HR = Home runs; RBI = Runs batted in; SB = Stolen bases; BB = Walks; AVG = Batting average; SLG = Slugging average

Player	G	AB	R	H	2B	3B	HR	RBI	SB	BB	AVG	SLG
Rafael Devers	57	232	32	61	16	1	11	43	0	13	.263	.483
J. D. Martinez	54	211	22	45	16	0	7	27	1	22	.213	.389
Xander Bogaerts	56	203	36	61	8	0	11	28	8	21	.300	.502
Alex Verdugo	53	201	36	62	16	0	6	15	4	17	.308	.478
Jackie Bradley Jr.	55	191	32	54	11	0	7	22	5	23	.283	.450
Christian Vázquez	47	173	22	49	9	0	7	23	4	16	.283	.457
Michael Chavis	42	146	16	31	5	2	5	19	3	8	.212	.377
Kevin Pillar	30	117	20	32	7	2	4	13	1	8	.274	.470
José Peraza	34	111	13	25	8	1	1	8	1	5	.225	.342
Kevin Plawecki	24	82	8	28	5	1	1	17	1	5	.341	.463
Bobby Dalbec	23	80	13	21	3	0	8	16	0	10	.263	.600
Jonathan Araúz	25	72	8	18	2	0	1	9	0	8	.250	.319
Mitch Moreland	22	67	14	22	4	0	8	21	0	11	.328	.746
Tzu-Wei Lin	26	52	2	8	1	0	0	3	0	2	.154	.173
Christian Arroyo	14	50	7	12	1	0	3	8	0	4	.240	.440
Yairo Muñoz	12	45	6	15	5	0	1	4	2	0	.333	.511
Andrew Benintendi	14	39	4	4	1	0	0	1	1	11	.103	.128
César Puello	5	8	1	3	0	0	0	0	0	2	.375	.375
Deivy Grullón	1	3	0	1	0	0	0	1	0	1	.333	.333
Jonathan Lucroy	1	0	0	0	0	0	0	0	0	0	.---	.---
Team totals	60	2083	292	552	118	7	81	278	31	187	.265	.445

=== Pitching ===
Note: W = Wins; L = Losses; ERA = Earned run average; G = Games pitched; GS = Games started; SV = Saves; IP = Innings pitched; H = Hits allowed; R = Runs allowed; ER = Earned runs allowed; BB = Walks allowed; SO = Strikeouts

Player	W	L	ERA	G	GS	SV	IP	H	R	ER	BB	SO
Martín Pérez	3	5	4.50	12	12	0	62.0	55	33	31	28	46
Nathan Eovaldi	4	2	3.72	9	9	0	48.1	51	20	20	7	52
Ryan Weber	1	3	4.40	17	5	0	43.0	44	23	21	14	27
Phillips Valdéz	1	1	3.26	24	0	0	30.1	33	16	11	16	30
Chris Mazza	1	2	4.80	9	6	0	30.0	34	18	16	15	29
Zack Godley	0	4	8.16	8	7	0	28.2	42	26	26	14	28
Colten Brewer	0	3	5.61	11	4	0	25.2	31	17	16	14	25
Ryan Brasier	1	0	3.96	25	1	0	25.0	24	12	11	11	30
Matt Barnes	1	3	4.30	24	0	9	23.0	18	13	11	14	31
Jeffrey Springs	0	2	7.08	16	0	0	20.1	30	18	16	7	28
Austin Brice	1	0	5.95	21	1	0	19.2	17	13	13	13	25
Tanner Houck	3	0	0.53	3	3	0	17.0	6	2	1	9	21
Josh Osich	1	1	5.74	13	1	0	15.2	16	10	10	5	20
Dylan Covey	0	0	7.07	8	0	0	14.0	18	11	11	2	11
Mike Kickham	1	1	7.71	6	2	0	14.0	21	12	12	5	17
Robert Stock	0	1	4.73	10	0	0	13.1	16	9	7	10	14
Marcus Walden	0	2	9.45	15	0	1	13.1	23	18	14	9	10
Kyle Hart	0	1	15.55	4	3	0	11.0	24	21	19	10	13
Nick Pivetta	2	0	1.80	2	2	0	10.0	8	2	2	5	13
Heath Hembree	2	0	5.59	11	0	0	9.2	9	6	6	3	10
Matt Hall	0	3	18.69	4	1	0	8.2	17	18	18	10	9
Darwinzon Hernández	1	0	2.16	7	0	0	8.1	5	2	2	8	13
Andrew Triggs	0	1	4.50	4	2	0	8.0	8	4	4	3	7
Josh Taylor	1	1	9.82	8	0	0	7.1	7	8	8	5	7
Brandon Workman	0	0	4.05	7	0	4	6.2	8	3	3	4	8
Robinson Leyer	0	0	21.21	6	1	0	4.2	12	11	11	8	9
Domingo Tapia	0	0	2.08	5	0	0	4.1	4	1	1	2	4
Tzu-Wei Lin	0	0	27.00	1	0	0	1.0	4	3	3	0	0
Kevin Plawecki	0	0	0.00	1	0	0	0.2	0	0	0	1	0
José Peraza	0	0	27.00	1	0	0	0.1	2	1	1	0	0
Team totals	24	36	5.58	60	60	14	524.0	587	351	325	252	537

=== MLB debuts ===
Red Sox players who made their MLB debuts during the 2020 regular season:

- July 24: Jonathan Araúz
- August 13: Kyle Hart
- August 30: Bobby Dalbec
- August 31: Robinson Leyer
- September 11: Domingo Tapia
- September 15: Tanner Houck

=== Transactions ===
Notable transactions of/for players on the 40-man roster during the 2020 regular season:

- July 25: The team claimed pitcher Stephen Gonsalves off of waivers from the New York Mets.
- July 26: The team claimed pitcher Robert Stock off of waivers from the Philadelphia Phillies.
- July 29: Catcher Jonathan Lucroy was designated for assignment; he was sent outright to the alternate training site on August 1.
- August 13: The team claimed infielder Christian Arroyo off of waivers from the Cleveland Indians.
- August 19: The team claimed pitcher Andrew Triggs off of waivers from the San Francisco Giants. Gonsalves and fellow pitcher Mike Shawaryn were designated for assignment; both were outrighted to minor league assignments a week later.
- August 20: The team designated Arroyo for assignment; he was sent outright to the alternate training site on August 23.
- August 21: The team traded Brandon Workman, Heath Hembree, and cash considerations to Philadelphia for pitcher Nick Pivetta and minor leaguer pitcher Connor Seabold.
- August 26: The team released pitcher R. J. Alvarez.
- August 30: The team traded Mitch Moreland to the San Diego Padres for two minor-league prospects, infielder Hudson Potts and outfielder Jeisson Rosario. The team also released infielder Marco Hernández.
- August 31: On the day of the trade deadline, the team sent Kevin Pillar to the Colorado Rockies and Josh Osich to the Chicago Cubs; both in exchange for a player to be named later, plus "future considerations" from the Rockies.
- September 3: The team claimed catcher Deivy Grullón off of waivers from Philadelphia.
- September 18: The Red Sox received pitcher Jacob Wallace from the Rockies, to complete the Pillar trade.

=== Amateur draft ===
Boston's selections in the 2020 MLB draft, held on June 10–11, are listed below. The team did not have a second-round pick, as punishment from MLB's investigation about electronic sign-stealing by the 2018 Red Sox. The draft was limited to five rounds, per agreement reached in March 2020 between MLB and the Major League Baseball Players Association (MLBPA). The deadline to sign drafted players was August 1, 2020.

Round	Pick	Player	Position	B/T	Class	School	Signing date
1	17	Nick Yorke	2B	R/R	HS Sr.	Mitty HS (CA)	July 7
3	89	Blaze Jordan	3B	R/R	HS Sr.	DeSoto Central HS (MS)	July 17
4	118	Jeremy Wu-Yelland	P	L/L	4YR Jr.	Hawaii	July 15
5	148	Shane Drohan	P	L/L	4YR Jr.	Florida State	July 17

== Farm system ==
Minor league managerial assignments were announced by the Red Sox on January 16, 2020. The only change from the prior season was Sandy Madera, named to manage one of the Dominican Summer League teams. In March, MLB Pipeline ranked the Red Sox' farm system 25th, in their evaluation of the minor league organizations of all 30 MLB teams. On June 30, it was announced that the 2020 Minor League Baseball season would not be played, another impact of the COVID-19 pandemic on sports.

Level	Team	League	Manager
AAA	Pawtucket Red Sox	International League	Billy McMillon
AA	Portland Sea Dogs	Eastern League	Joe Oliver
A-Advanced	Salem Red Sox	Carolina League	Corey Wimberly
A	Greenville Drive	South Atlantic League	Iggy Suarez
A-Short Season	Lowell Spinners	New York–Penn League	Luke Montz
Rookie	GCL Red Sox	Gulf Coast League	Tom Kotchman
Rookie	DSL Red Sox 1	Dominican Summer League	Ozzie Chavez
Rookie	DSL Red Sox 2	Dominican Summer League	Sandy Madera
