= Matt Hall (baseball) =

American baseball player (born 1993)

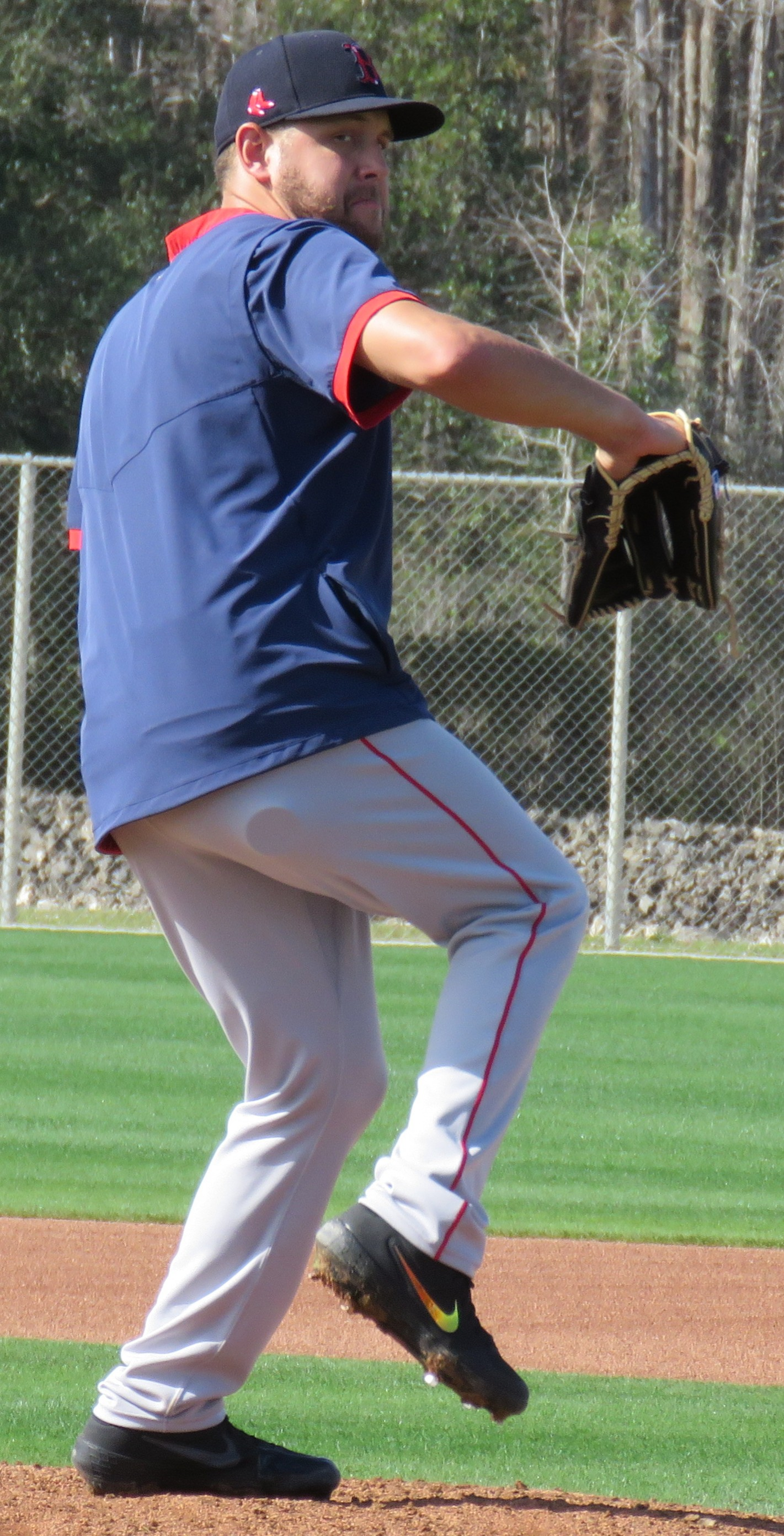
- Hall with the Boston Red Sox
- Pitcher
- Born: July 23, 1993 (age 32); Independence, Missouri, U.S.
- Batted: Left Threw: Left

MLB debut
- September 15, 2018, for the Detroit Tigers

Last MLB appearance
- September 11, 2020, for the Boston Red Sox

MLB statistics
- Win–loss record: 0–3
- Earned run average: 11.23
- Strikeouts: 39
- Stats at Baseball Reference

Teams
- Detroit Tigers (2018–2019); Boston Red Sox (2020)

Matthew Thomas Hall (born July 23, 1993) is an American former professional baseball pitcher. He played in Major League Baseball (MLB) for the Detroit Tigers and Boston Red Sox. He played college baseball for Missouri State University. The Tigers selected Hall in the sixth round of the 2015 MLB draft. Listed at 6 feet 0 inches (1.83 m) and 200 pounds (91 kg), he throws and bats left-handed.

== Amateur career ==
Hall attended Lee's Summit West High School in Lee's Summit, Missouri. He then attended Missouri State University, where he played college baseball for the Missouri State Bears. Hall played collegiate summer baseball in 2014 for the Falmouth Commodores of the Cape Cod Baseball League, where he was named a league all-star. On May 5, 2015, the National Collegiate Baseball Writers Association named Hall their NCAA Division I Pitcher of the Week. Collegiate Baseball named him a First-Team All-American after the 2015 season.

== Professional career ==
=== Detroit Tigers ===
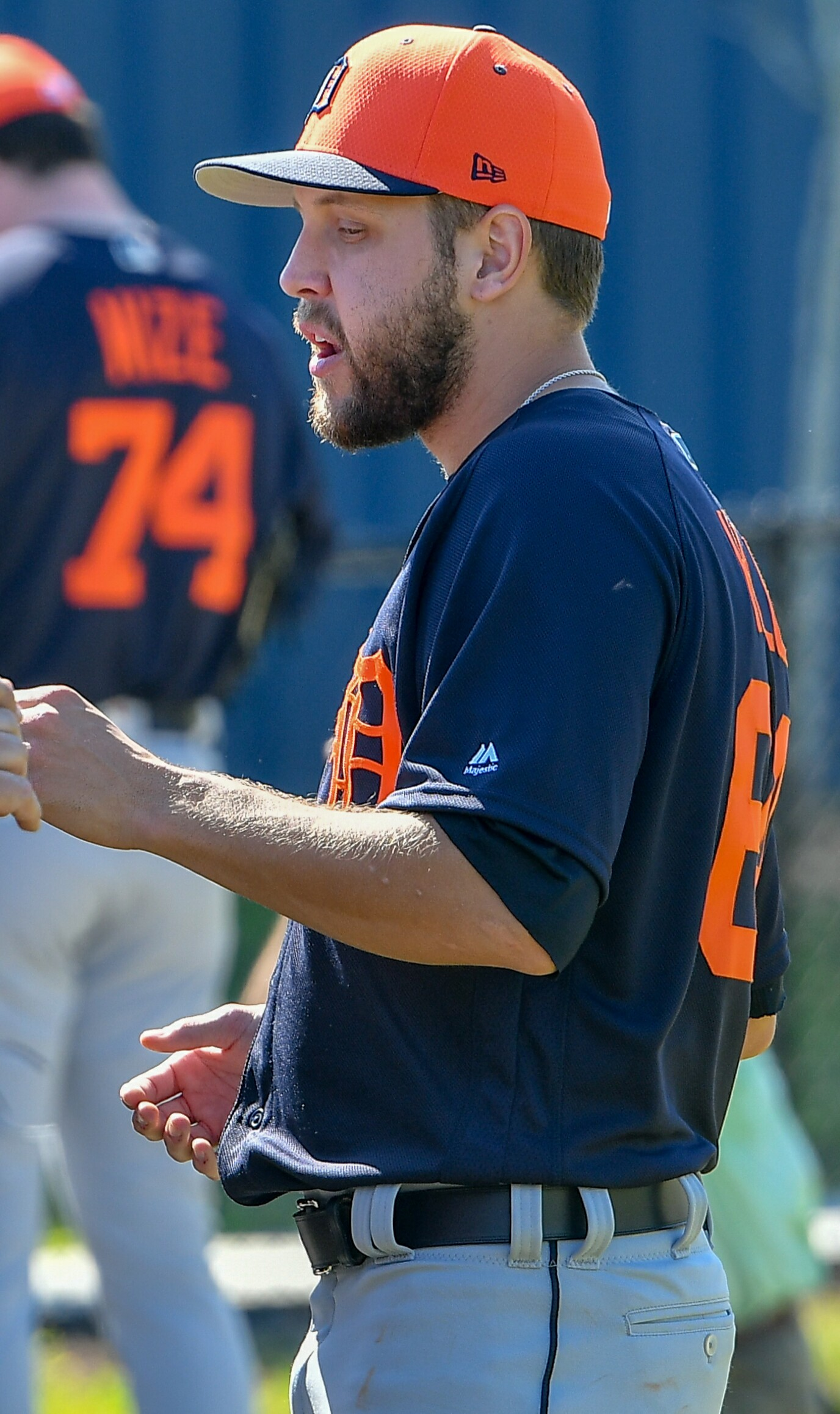
Hall with the Detroit Tigers in 2019

The Detroit Tigers selected Hall in the sixth round of the 2015 MLB draft. After he signed, he pitched for the Connecticut Tigers of the Low–A New York-Penn League. In 2016, he pitched for the West Michigan Whitecaps of the Single–A Midwest League. He began the 2017 season with the Lakeland Flying Tigers of the High–A Florida State League, and was promoted to the Erie SeaWolves of the Double–A Eastern League in August.

In 2018, Hall began working as a relief pitcher for Erie. On July 9, he was named the Eastern League's Pitcher of the Week. The next day, the Tigers promoted him to the Toledo Mud Hens of the Triple–A International League. Hall was named the Tigers Minor League Pitcher of the Year. In 37 combined appearances between Erie and Toledo, he posted a 2.13 ERA and 1.085 WHIP, with 135 strikeouts in 114 1/3 innings. He had his contract purchased and was promoted to the major leagues on September 11, 2018, as a September call-up. He made his major league debut for the Tigers on September 15 in a game against the Cleveland Indians, where he pitched one inning, allowing eight hits, one walk and nine runs, six of which were earned. Hall made a total of five appearances with the 2018 Tigers, recording a 14.63 ERA while striking out five batters in eight innings pitched. During the 2019 season, Hall split time between Toledo and Detroit. With the 2019 Tigers he made 16 appearances, compiling an 0–1 record with 7.71 ERA and 27 strikeouts in 23 1/3 innings.

=== Boston Red Sox ===
On January 17, 2020, Hall was traded to the Boston Red Sox in exchange for minor league catcher Jhon Nuñez. Red Sox general manager Chaim Bloom believed in Hall, who at the time of the trade had given up 33 earned runs in 31 1/3 innings. On March 26, the team optioned Hall to the Class A-Advanced Salem Red Sox. He was added to Boston's active roster for the delayed start of the 2020 season, and made his first major league start in the team's fifth game, pitching on July 28 against the New York Mets and taking the loss. He was optioned to the Red Sox' alternate training site on August 6, and called-up three times during September. Overall with the 2020 Red Sox, Hall appeared in four games (one start), compiling an 0–3 record with 18.69 ERA and 9 strikeouts in 8 2/3 innings pitched. On November 20, 2020, Hall was designated for assignment, and assigned outright to Triple-A Pawtucket five days later, with Bloom continuing to see promise in Hall and giving him another chance. He was released on August 16, 2021.

=== Kansas City Monarchs ===
On August 22, 2021, Hall signed with the Kansas City Monarchs of the American Association of Professional Baseball. In 2021, Hall recorded a 2-0 record and 0.75 ERA in 3 appearances with the Monarchs. On April 15, 2022, Hall re-signed with the Monarchs for the 2022 season. In 2022, Hall recorded a 4-1 record and 1.29 ERA in 5 appearances with the Monarchs.

=== San Francisco Giants ===
On June 12, 2022, Hall signed a minor league contract with the San Francisco Giants organization. He made two appearances (starting one) for the Triple-A Sacramento River Cats, allowing 4 earned runs and striking out 4 in 3.1 innings pitched. Hall was released by the Giants on July 4.

=== Kansas City Monarchs (second stint) ===
On July 14, 2022, Hall signed with the Kansas City Monarchs of the American Association of Professional Baseball. Hall started 14 games for the Monarchs in 2022, logging a 10-2 record and 1.10 ERA with 113 strikeouts in 82.0 innings pitched.

=== Gastonia Honey Hunters ===
On April 19, 2023, Hall was traded to the Gastonia Honey Hunters of the Atlantic League of Professional Baseball in exchange for future considerations. He was released prior to the season on April 28.

=== Charros de Jalisco ===
On April 10, 2024, Hall came out of retirement to sign with the Charros de Jalisco of the Mexican League. In 10 games, he struggled to a 0–1 record with a 8.91 ERA and posted 35 strikeouts over 32 1/3 innings pitched. Hall was waived by the Charros on June 13.

=== Tigres de Quintana Roo ===
On June 14, 2024, Hall was claimed off waivers by the Tigres de Quintana Roo of the Mexican League. In 3 starts, he posted an inflated 14.29 ERA after giving up 9 earned runs in 5 2/3 innings. On July 9, Hall was released by Quintana Roo.

=== Kansas City Monarchs (third stint) ===
On July 28, 2024, Hall signed with the Kansas City Monarchs of the American Association of Professional Baseball. In six starts for the Monarchs, he posted a 2–2 record and 4.82 ERA with 38 strikeouts over 28 innings of work.

== Coaching career ==
On August 1, 2023, Hall was named the pitching coach for the Kansas City Monarchs of the American Association of Professional Baseball.

On January 31, 2025, Hall was once again named as pitching coach for the Monarchs, following a brief return to playing.
