= Raquel Ferreira =

American baseball executive

Boston Red Sox
- Executive Vice President / Assistant General Manager
- Born: Cumberland, Rhode Island, U.S.

Teams
- Boston Red Sox (1999–present)

Raquel Ferreira is an American baseball executive who is an executive vice president and assistant general manager for the Boston Red Sox of Major League Baseball (MLB). In 2014, she became the third female vice-president of baseball operations in MLB history.

== Baseball career ==
Ferreira was first hired by the Boston Red Sox in 1999 as an administrative assistant by Kent Qualls. In 2003, she was promoted to Director of Minor League Administration by then general manager Theo Epstein. In 2004, she played a key role in the team's rookie development program.

In late 2014, Ferreira was promoted to Vice President of Baseball Administration, making her the third female vice-president of baseball operations in MLB history, joining Jean Afterman and Kim Ng, who have had assistant general manager roles with the New York Yankees and Los Angeles Dodgers, respectively.

Ferreira has led large player signings for the Red Sox, such as the six-year, $120 million contract extension for Xander Bogaerts in April 2019.

In September 2019, Ferreira became part of the interim leadership team—along with assistant general managers Brian O'Halloran, Eddie Romero, and Zack Scott—to oversee the Red Sox baseball operations department after the departure of general manager Dave Dombrowski. Along with additional responsibilities, she became the highest ranking woman in MLB operations and a rare female in charge of an MLB team during the regular season. In December 2019, the Red Sox and Ferreira agreed to a multi-year contract, under which her title is Executive Vice President / Assistant General Manager.

During her tenure with the Red Sox, the team has won four World Series championships.

== Personal life ==
Ferreira was born and raised in Cumberland, Rhode Island, the daughter of Gamaliel and Lotty Ferreira, immigrants from Cape Verde. Ferreira graduated from the University of Rhode Island with a B.A. in Communications in 1992. She grew up watching the Pawtucket Red Sox, the local minor league team.

Ferreira is married to Erik Stamps, with whom she has one daughter.

== See also ==
- Women in baseball
