= Deivy Grullón =

Dominican baseball player (born 1996)

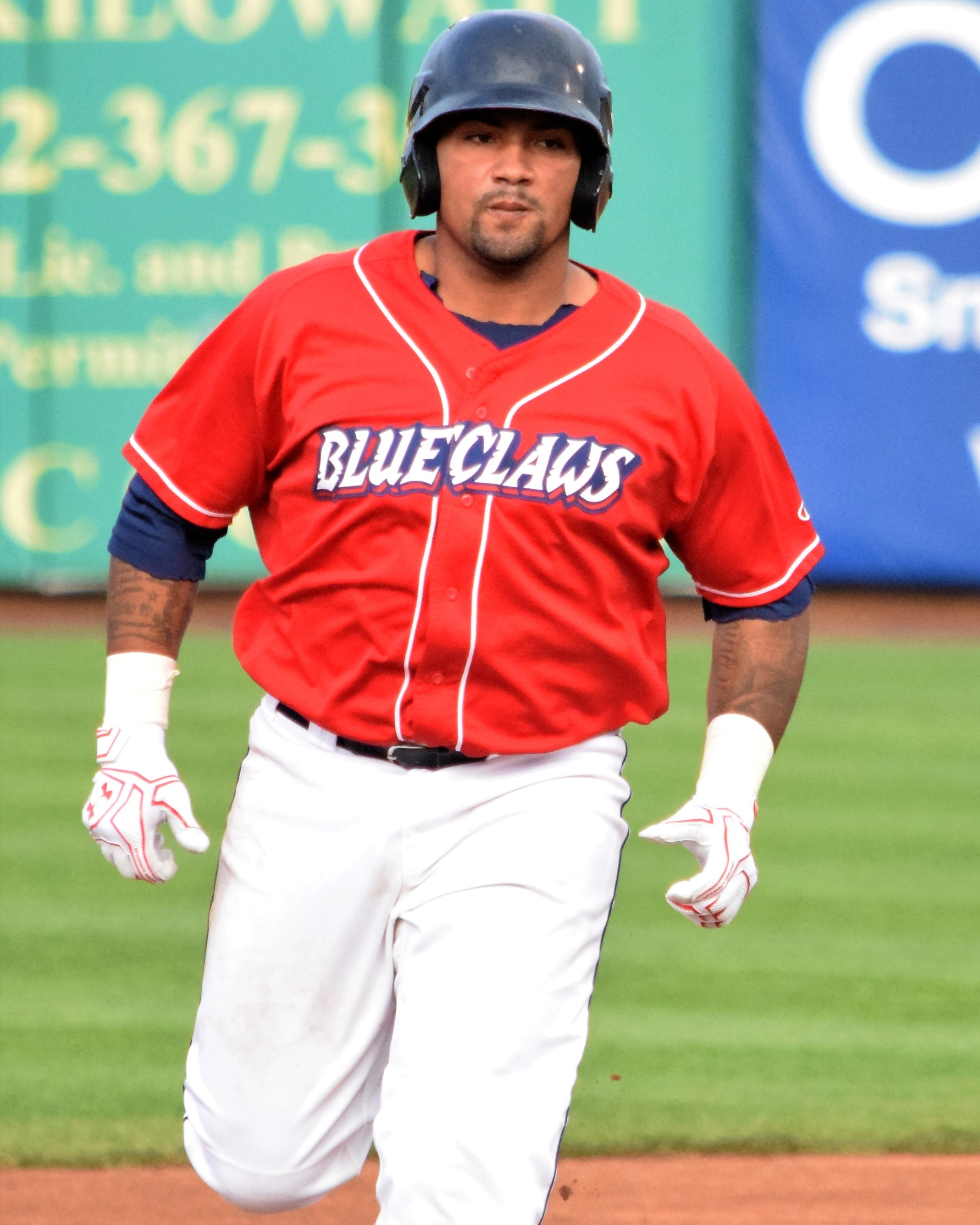
- Grullón with the Lakewood BlueClaws in 2016

Leones de Yucatán – No. 51
- Catcher
- Born: February 17, 1996 (age 30); Bonao, Dominican Republic
- Bats: Right Throws: Right

MLB debut
- September 22, 2019, for the Philadelphia Phillies

MLB statistics (through 2020 season)
- Batting average: .167
- Home runs: 0
- Runs batted in: 2
- Stats at Baseball Reference

Teams
- Philadelphia Phillies (2019); Boston Red Sox (2020)

Deivy Wilrin Grullón (pronounced "DAY-vee gru-YOHN"; born February 17, 1996) is a Dominican professional baseball catcher for the Leones de Yucatán of the Mexican League. He has previously played in Major League Baseball (MLB) for the Philadelphia Phillies and Boston Red Sox. Listed at 5 feet 11 inches (1.80 m) and 240 pounds (110 kg), he bats and throws right-handed.

== Career ==
=== Philadelphia Phillies ===
Grullón was born in Bonao, Dominican Republic. He signed with the Philadelphia Phillies for $575,000 as an international free agent, on July 2, 2012.

In 2013, Grullón made his professional debut as a 17-year-old with the Gulf Coast Phillies in the rookie–level Gulf Coast League, batting .273/.333/.364, with 1 home run (HR) and 14 runs batted in (RBI), in 121 at bats (AB). In 2014, he played for the Williamsport Crosscutters in the Low–A New York-Penn League, the Lakewood BlueClaws in the Single–A South Atlantic League, and the Clearwater Threshers in the High–A Florida State League, batting .227/.267/.297, with 1 HR and 26 RBI, in 273 AB, for the three teams combined.

Grullón played in Lakewood in 2015 (batting .221/.273/.335) and 2016 (batting .256./.320/.375). He played in 2017 with Clearwater and with the Reading Fightin Phils of the Double-A Eastern League, batting a combined .249/.283/.398, with 12 HR and 37 RBI, in 354 AB. Grullón was named a mid-season 2017 Florida State League All Star.

Grullón played 2018 with Reading, batting .273/.310/.515, with 21 HR (tied for 4th in the league) and 59 RBI, in 326 AB. He was named a 2018 Eastern League mid-season and post-season All Star, and a 2018 MiLB Phillies Organization All Star. Grullón also won the 2018 Eastern League Home Run Derby.

Grullón started 2019 with the Lehigh Valley IronPigs of the Triple-A International League, batting .283/.354/.496, with 21 home runs (5th in the league) and 77 RBIs (tied for 4th), as well as 133 strikeouts (4th), in 407 at bats. He was named a 2019 International League All Star. Baseball America ranked Grullón the team's 12th-best prospect, and MLB Pipeline ranked him the Phillies 19th-best prospect while grading his arm as a 65 out of 80. He is known for having a very strong arm.

On September 1, 2019, the Phillies selected Grullón's contract, promoting him to the big leagues. He made his MLB debut on September 22 versus the Cleveland Indians as a pinch hitter for Jay Bruce and remained in the game as the designated hitter. Grullón's 2019 Phillies stat line included one hit (a double) in nine at bats. In 2020, Grullón did not make an appearance with the Phillies and was designated for assignment on August 31.

=== Boston Red Sox ===
On September 3, 2020, Grullón was claimed off waivers by the Boston Red Sox. He was added to Boston's active roster on September 8, and made his first appearance with the Red Sox that day, registering a hit and an RBI against the Phillies. It was Grullón's only appearance with the 2020 Red Sox, as he was optioned back to the team's alternate training site the next day.

=== Cincinnati Reds ===
On December 23, 2020, Grullón was claimed off waivers by the Cincinnati Reds. On April 3, 2021, Grullón was designated for assignment following the waiver claim of Beau Taylor.

=== Tampa Bay Rays ===
On April 6, 2021, Grullón was claimed off waivers by the Tampa Bay Rays. He was assigned to the Triple-A Durham Bulls. On April 24, Grullón was designated for assignment by the Rays.

=== New York Mets ===
On April 28, 2021, Grullón was claimed off waivers by the New York Mets. He was assigned to the Triple-A Syracuse Mets, and hit .146/.167/.341 with 2 home runs and 8 RBI in 11 games. On May 18, Grullón was designated for assignment by the Mets following the promotion of Wilfredo Tovar, without having appeared for the team.

=== Tampa Bay Rays (second stint) ===
On May 22, 2021, Grullón was again claimed off waivers by the Tampa Bay Rays and was assigned to Triple-A Durham. On June 11, Grullón was again designated for assignment by Tampa Bay after the team acquired Matt Wisler. He had not made an appearance with the Rays at the time of his designation. He was outrighted to Durham on June 13. In 21 games with the Bulls, Grullón batted .226/.347/.532 with 6 home runs and 12 RBI.

=== Chicago White Sox ===
On July 15, 2021, Grullón was traded to the Chicago White Sox in exchange for cash considerations. Grullón made 11 appearances for the Triple-A Charlotte Knights, hitting .200 with 2 home runs and 5 RBI's. On August 31, Grullón was released by the White Sox.

=== Boston Red Sox (second stint) ===
On March 16, 2022, Grullón signed a minor-league contract with the Boston Red Sox. In 20 games for the Triple–A Worcester Red Sox, he batted .250/.318/.500 with 3 home runs and 13 RBI. Grullón elected free agency following the season on November 10.

=== Lake Country DockHounds ===
On January 2, 2024, Grullón signed with the Lake Country DockHounds of the American Association of Professional Baseball. In 69 games for Lake Country, he slashed .295/.350/.440 with six home runs and 43 RBI. Grullón was released by the DockHounds on August 30.

=== Olmecas de Tabasco ===
On February 26, 2026, Grullón signed with the Olmecas de Tabasco of the Mexican League. In two games for the Olmecas, Grullón went 0-for-6 at the plate with one strikeout. He was released by Tabasco on April 24.

=== Leones de Yucatán ===
On May 27, 2026, Grullón signed with the Leones de Yucatán of the Mexican League.
