= Robinson Leyer =

Dominican baseball player (born 1993)

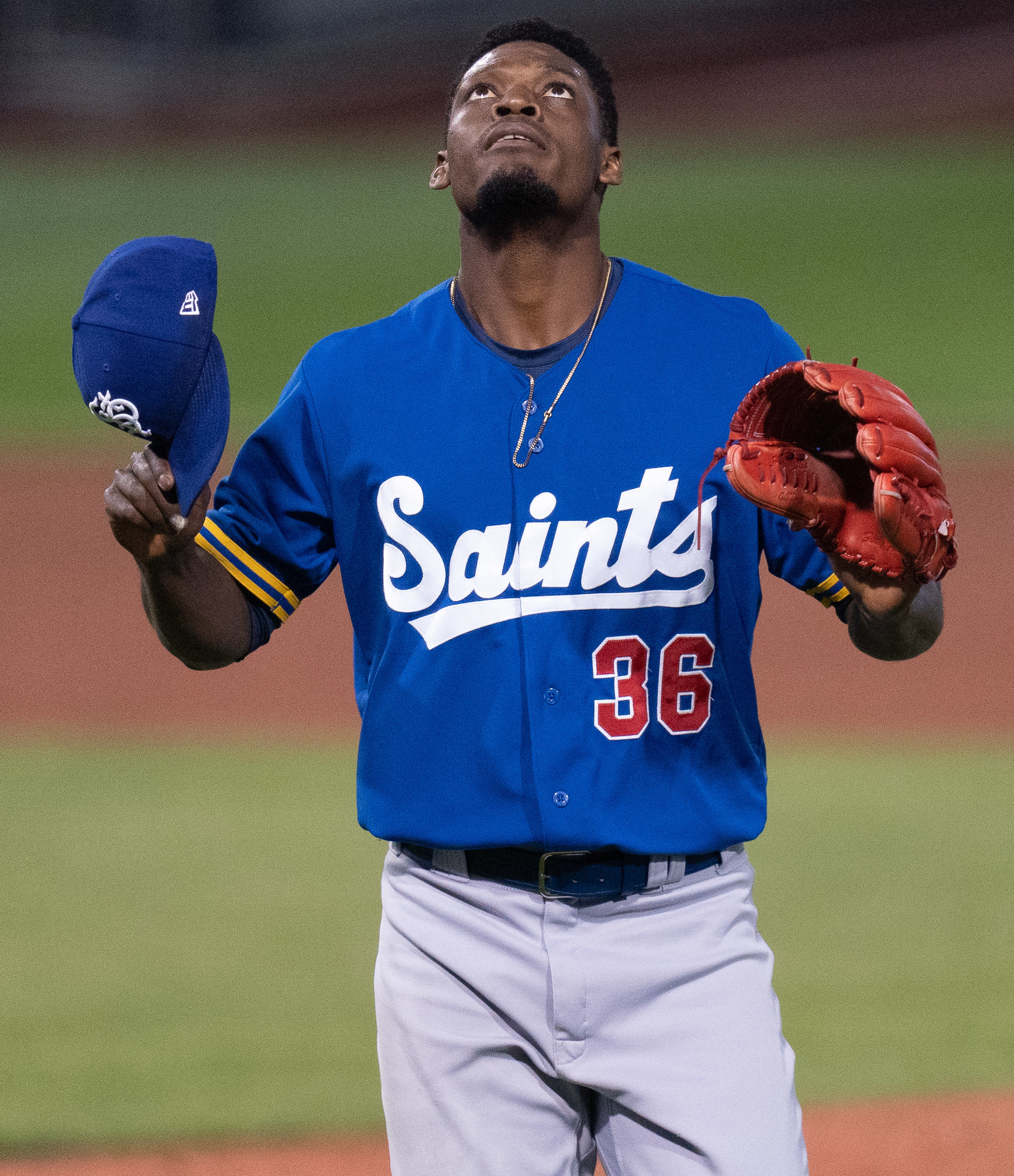
- Leyer with the St. Paul Saints in 2021
- Pitcher
- Born: March 13, 1993 (age 33); El Seibo, Dominican Republic
- Bats: Right Throws: Right

MLB debut
- August 31, 2020, for the Boston Red Sox

MLB statistics (through 2020 season)
- Win–loss record: 0–0
- Earned run average: 21.21
- Strikeouts: 9
- Stats at Baseball Reference

Teams
- Boston Red Sox (2020)

Robinson Leyer (born March 13, 1993) is a Dominican former professional baseball pitcher. He has previously played in Major League Baseball (MLB) for the Boston Red Sox. He made his MLB debut with Boston in 2020. Listed at 6 feet 2 inches (1.88 m) and 185 pounds (84 kg), he bats and throws right-handed.

== Career ==
=== Chicago White Sox ===
On November 6, 2011, Leyer signed with the Chicago White Sox as an international free agent. Leyer pitched in the farm system of the White Sox from 2012 through 2017. Leyer split the 2016 season between the High–A Winston-Salem Dash and Double–A Birmingham Barons, compiling a combined 4–6 record and 4.82 ERA with 75 strikeouts across 37 appearances. He elected free agency following the season on November 7, 2016.

Leyer re–signed with Chicago on a minor league contract on March 8, 2017, and spent the campaign with Birmingham, logging a 3.55 ERA over 38 appearances out of the bullpen. In his tenure with the White Sox, he advanced from the Dominican Summer League to the Double-A level.

=== Cincinnati Reds ===
On March 21, 2018, Leyer was traded to the Cincinnati Reds. With the Double–A Pensacola Blue Wahoos, he registered a 2.59 earned run average (ERA) in 42 relief appearances spanning 59 innings pitched. On November 2, Leyer elected free agency.

=== Seattle Mariners ===
On January 4, 2019, Leyer signed a minor league contract with the Seattle Mariners. In 2019, with the Mariners organization, Leyer reached the Triple-A level for the first time, appearing in 13 games with the Tacoma Rainiers of the Pacific Coast League, recording a 4.58 ERA and 27 strikeouts in 19 2/3 innings pitched. He was released by the Mariners organization on June 15.

=== Boston Red Sox ===
The Boston Red Sox signed Leyer as a minor league free agent on June 22, 2019. That season, Leyer appeared in a total of 18 games with the Low–A Lowell Spinners and the Double-A Portland Sea Dogs. Through eight seasons from 2012 to 2019, Leyer appeared in 236 minor league games (84 starts), compiling a 28–43 record with 4.24 ERA and 522 strikeouts in 623 1/3 innings pitched. He elected free agency following the season on November 4, but re–signed with organization on December 20 on a new minor league contract.

The Red Sox called Leyer up to the majors for the first time on August 31, 2020. He made his debut the same night against the Atlanta Braves, pitching one inning, giving up two hits, one earned run, and one walk while striking out one batter, Marcell Ozuna. He was optioned back to Boston's alternate training site on September 18. Overall with the 2020 Red Sox, Leyer appeared in six games (one start), compiling an 0–0 record with 21.21 ERA and 9 strikeouts in 4 2/3 innings pitched. On October 26, Leyer was assigned to Triple-A and outrighted off of the 40-man roster. He became a minor-league free agent on November 2, 2020.

=== Minnesota Twins ===
On February 8, 2021, Leyer signed a minor league contract with the Minnesota Twins organization. In 35 appearances for the Triple-A St. Paul Saints, he struggled to a 1–4 record and 6.95 ERA with 51 strikeouts across 45 1/3 innings pitched. Leyer elected free agency following the season on November 7.
