= Luis Ortiz (third baseman) =

Dominican baseball player & coach (born 1970)

Cleveland Guardians
- Third baseman / Coach
- Born: May 25, 1970 (age 56); Santo Domingo, Dominican Republic
- Batted: Right Threw: Right

Professional debut
- MLB: August 31, 1993, for the Boston Red Sox
- NPB: April 6, 1997, for the Yakult Swallows

Last appearance
- MLB: September 28, 1996, for the Texas Rangers
- NPB: May 29, 1997, for the Yakult Swallows

MLB statistics
- Batting average: .228
- Home runs: 2
- Runs batted in: 26

NPB statistics
- Batting average: .172
- Home runs: 0
- Runs batted in: 7
- Stats at Baseball Reference

Teams
- As player: Boston Red Sox (1993–1994); Texas Rangers (1995–1996); Yakult Swallows (1997); As coach: San Diego Padres (2017); Los Angeles Dodgers (2018); Texas Rangers (2019–2021); Boston Red Sox (2022–2024); Cleveland Guardians (2025–present)

Luis Alberto Ortiz (born May 25, 1970) is a Dominican professional baseball coach and former third baseman who currently serves as the special assistant to player development and hitting for the Cleveland Guardians of Major League Baseball (MLB). Ortiz played in MLB (MLB) from 1993 to 1996 for the Boston Red Sox and Texas Rangers.

== Playing career ==
Ortiz played three seasons at Union University in Jackson, Tennessee. He was drafted by the Boston Red Sox in the 8th round of the 1991 MLB draft.

Ortiz played in minor league systems of the Red Sox, Texas Rangers, Arizona Diamondbacks, Montreal Expos and St. Louis Cardinals from 1991 to 2004.

In a four-season MLB career, Ortiz was a .228 hitter (33-for-145) with two home runs and 26 RBI in 60 games, including 14 runs, seven doubles and three triples.

Following his time in MLB, Ortiz played in Nippon Professional Baseball with the 1997 Yakult Swallows.

== Coaching career ==
After retiring from baseball, Ortiz opened a baseball school in Keller, Texas, called Swing City. He has published four hitting books; The Natural Hitter Handbook, plus three drills books.

Ortiz started his professional coaching career in the Texas Rangers organization as a coach for the Spokane Indians in 2008. He was a roving hitting coordinator in the Rangers' system from 2009 through 2011. In 2012, he was promoted to assistant hitting coordinator. Ortiz was let go from the Rangers organization after Tim Purpura was brought in by Nolan Ryan to run the Rangers player development system.

Ortiz was the lower level hitting coordinator and the cultural development coordinator for the Cleveland Indians in 2013. In 2014, he was promoted to assistant field coordinator while performing the role of hitting coordinator.

Ortiz joined the San Diego Padres, and from 2015 through 2017 served as their minor-league field and hitting coordinator. He was named the interim major league hitting coach of the Padres for the final month of the 2017 season, after Alan Zinter was fired.

On December 1, 2017, Ortiz was hired by the Los Angeles Dodgers to share the dual role of assistant major league hitting coach/minor league hitting coordinator with Brant Brown. He spent the 2018 season in that role.

On November 14, 2018, Ortiz was named the hitting coach of the Texas Rangers, joining new manager Chris Woodward's staff. Ortiz was let go by Texas following the 2021 season.

In December 2021, Ortiz was named an assisting hitting coach for the Boston Red Sox. On October 9, 2024, it was announced that he would not be retained on Boston's coaching staff.

On January 30, 2025, Ortiz was named the special assistant to player development and hitting for the Cleveland Guardians.

== Personal life ==
Ortiz went back to school and graduated from Union University in Jackson, Tennessee with a Bachelor of Science in Physical Education & Health, with a minor in Management & Marketing. In doing so, he became the first player from the Dominican Republic to both play in MLB and graduate from college. Ortiz is married to his wife Susan, whom he met while at Union University, and they have four daughters, Gabriela, Naomi, Samantha, and Moriah.

Preceded by Tim Hyers	Los Angeles Dodgers assistant hitting coach 2018 (Shared with Brant Brown)	Succeeded by Aaron Bates
Preceded by Anthony Iapoce	Texas Rangers hitting coach 2019–2021	Succeeded by Tim Hyers
