= Josh Taylor (baseball) =

American baseball player (born 1993)

- Pitcher
- Born: March 2, 1993 (age 33); Phoenix, Arizona, U.S.
- Batted: Left Threw: Left

MLB debut
- May 29, 2019, for the Boston Red Sox

Last MLB appearance
- May 27, 2023, for the Kansas City Royals

MLB statistics
- Win–loss record: 5–6
- Earned run average: 4.35
- Strikeouts: 155
- Stats at Baseball Reference

Teams
- Boston Red Sox (2019–2021); Kansas City Royals (2023)

Joshua Earl Taylor (born March 2, 1993) is an American former professional baseball pitcher. He played in Major League Baseball (MLB) for the Boston Red Sox and Kansas City Royals. Listed at 6 feet 5 inches (1.96 m) and 225 pounds (102 kg), he throws and bats left-handed.

== Amateur career ==
Taylor attended Centennial High School in Peoria, Arizona. He attended and played college baseball at Scottsdale Community College and Georgia College & State University.

== Professional career ==
=== Philadelphia Phillies ===
Taylor signed with the Philadelphia Phillies organization as an undrafted free agent in August 2014. In three games in the Gulf Coast League, he pitched 9 1/3 innings while allowing no earned runs.

=== Arizona Diamondbacks ===
Taylor was traded to the Arizona Diamondbacks organization in July 2015. Overall with two Class A teams in 2015, Taylor made 24 appearances (all starts) with a 3.96 ERA and an 8–8 record. In 2016, Taylor pitched at both the Class A-Advanced and Double-A levels, appearing in a total of 26 games (24 starts) while compiling a 5–11 record with 5.36 ERA. Taylor spent most of 2017 at the Double-A level, along with a single appearance in the rookie-level Arizona League. Overall, his 2017 record was 4–7 with a 4.96 ERA in 34 games (14 starts).

=== Boston Red Sox ===
In May 2018, Taylor was acquired by the Boston Red Sox as the player to be named later from an earlier trade for Deven Marrero. At the time, he had been playing for the Class A-Advanced Visalia Rawhide; the Red Sox assigned him to the Double-A Portland Sea Dogs, and in September he was promoted to the Triple-A Pawtucket Red Sox. Overall during 2018, Taylor appeared in 48 games, all in relief, with a 3.35 ERA and 3–7 record with 13 saves.

The Red Sox added Taylor to their 40-man roster after the 2018 season. He started the 2019 season with Triple-A Pawtucket. On May 29, he was called up to the major leagues for the first time, making his debut that day against the Cleveland Indians. Taylor was optioned back to Pawtucket on June 10, then recalled on June 14. Overall with the 2019 Red Sox, Taylor appeared in 52 games (one start), compiling a 2–2 record with a 3.04 ERA and 62 strikeouts in 47 1/3 innings.

On July 4, 2020, it was announced that Taylor had tested positive for COVID-19. He remained on the injured list until being activated on August 17, and returned to the injured list on September 11 with left shoulder tendinitis. Overall with the 2020 Red Sox, Taylor appeared in eight games, all in relief, compiling a 1–1 record with 9.82 ERA and 7 strikeouts in 7 1/3 innings pitched.

Taylor began the 2021 season as a member of Boston's bullpen. On August 31, he was placed on the COVID-related list; he returned to the team on September 6. On September 11, Taylor recorded his first MLB save, closing out an extra innings win over the Chicago White Sox. On September 26, Taylor was placed on the injured list with a low back strain. Overall during the regular season, Taylor made 61 relief appearances for Boston, earning one win while logging a 3.40 ERA and striking out 60 batters in 47 2/3 innings. He then made six postseason appearances, allowing a single run in four innings, as the Red Sox advanced to the American League Championship Series.

Taylor began the 2022 season on the 10-day injured list due to a back injury; he was moved to the 60-day injured list on May 12.

=== Kansas City Royals ===
On January 24, 2023, the Red Sox traded Taylor to the Kansas City Royals for Adalberto Mondesí and Angel Pierre. Taylor was optioned to the Triple-A Omaha Storm Chasers to begin the 2023 season. On June 27, it was announced that Taylor would require surgery to repair a herniated disc in his lower back. He was transferred to the 60-day injured list on July 3.

On April 7, 2024, Taylor was placed back on the 60–day injured list with a biceps nerve issue that had plagued him during spring training. On October 31, Taylor elected for free agency.
