= Marcus Walden =

American baseball player (born 1988)

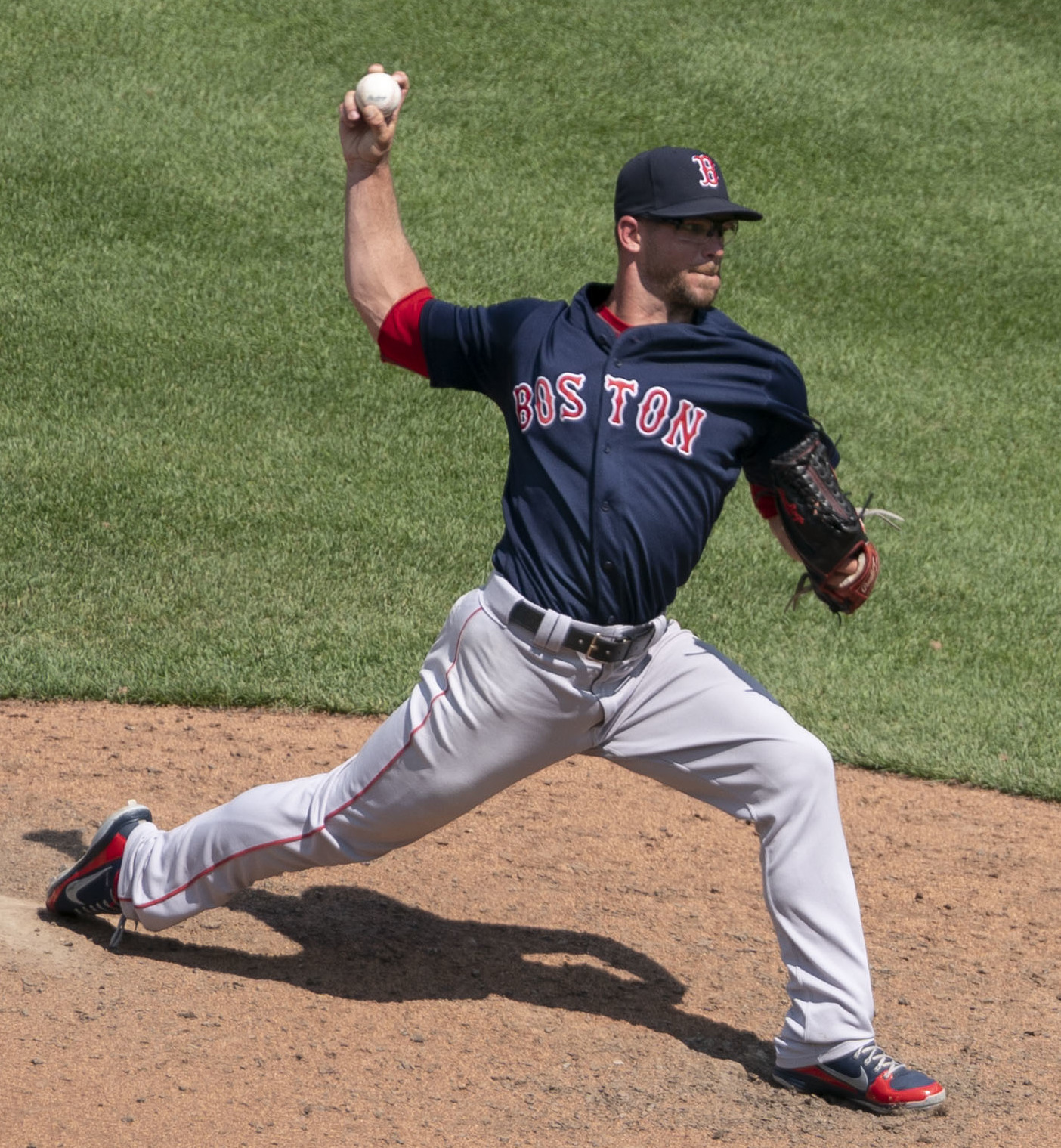
- Walden with the Boston Red Sox in 2019
- Pitcher
- Born: September 13, 1988 (age 38); Fresno, California, U.S.
- Batted: Right Threw: Right

MLB debut
- April 1, 2018, for the Boston Red Sox

Last MLB appearance
- September 22, 2020, for the Boston Red Sox

MLB statistics
- Win–loss record: 9–4
- Earned run average: 3.81
- Strikeouts: 100
- Stats at Baseball Reference

Teams
- Boston Red Sox (2018–2020)

Marcus Walter Walden (born September 13, 1988) is an American former professional baseball pitcher. He has previously played in Major League Baseball (MLB) for the Boston Red Sox. He made his MLB debut during 2018 after a decade of minor and independent league baseball. He both throws and bats right-handed, and is listed at 6 feet 0 inches (1.83 m) and 195 pounds (88 kg).

== Career ==
=== Toronto Blue Jays ===
Walden attended Central High School in Fresno, California, and Fresno City College. The Toronto Blue Jays drafted Walden in the ninth round, with the 295th overall selection, of the 2007 Major League Baseball draft.

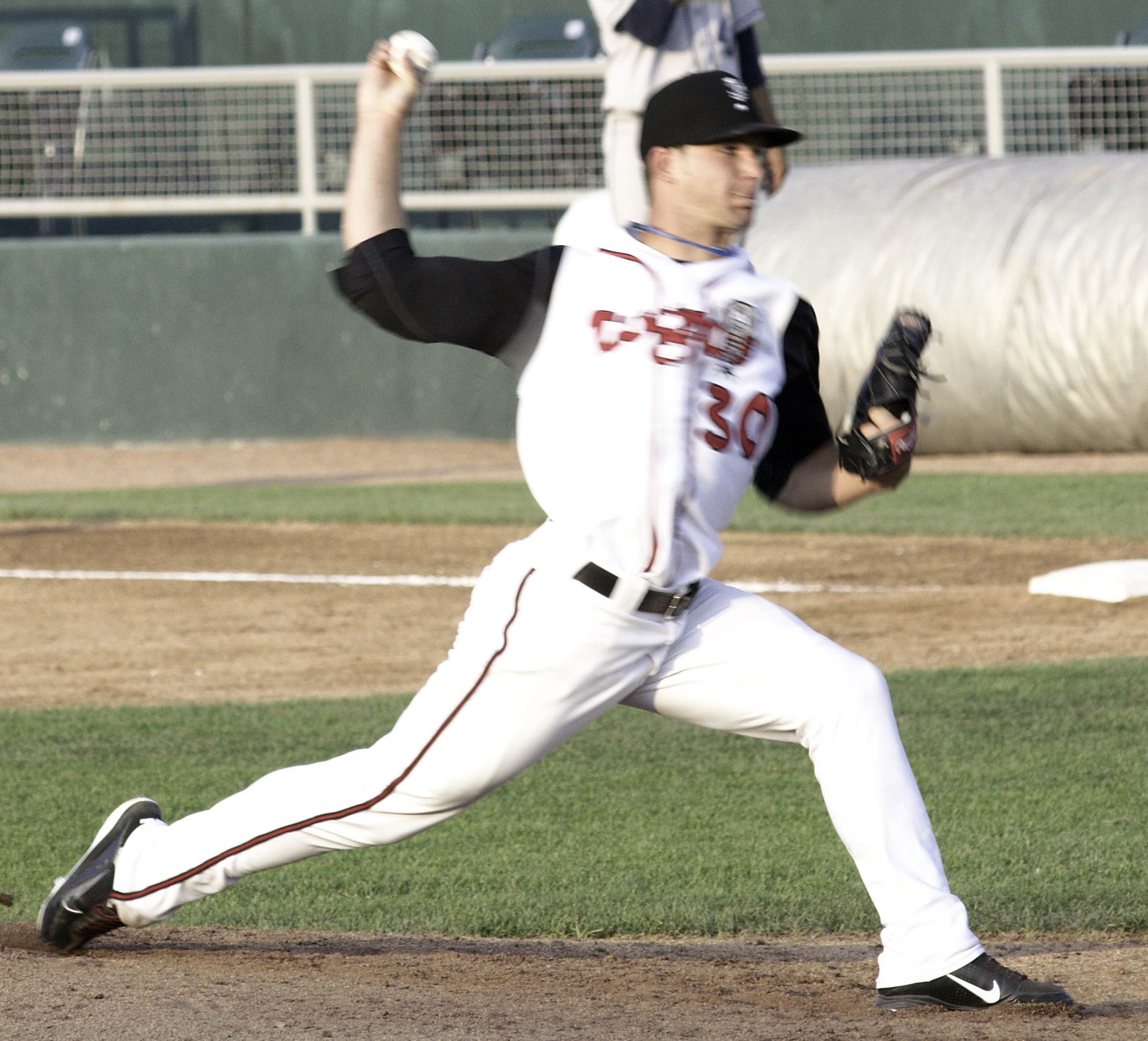
Walden with the Lansing Lugnuts in 2011

After pitching with Toronto's Rookie League and Low-A teams during 2007 and 2008, Walden missed most of the 2009 season and the entire 2010 season due to shoulder and elbow injuries that required surgeries, including Tommy John surgery. He returned to pitch for several Toronto farm teams during the 2011 through 2014 seasons, ultimately being promoted to the Triple–A Buffalo Bisons. On April 5, 2014, the Blue Jays promoted Walden to the major leagues for the first time, but they optioned him back to the minor leagues five days later without using him in a major league game, making him a phantom ballplayer. On April 15, Walden was designated for assignment by the Blue Jays.

=== Oakland Athletics ===
Walden was claimed off of waivers by the Oakland Athletics on April 16, 2014. On June 16, he was removed from the 40–man roster and sent outright to the Double–A Midland RockHounds. In 21 games for Midland, Walden posted a 3.79 ERA with 26 strikeouts; in 11 starts for the Triple–A Sacramento River Cats, he logged a 5.73 ERA with 34 strikeouts. He elected free agency after the season.

=== Cincinnati Reds ===
On November 30, 2014, Walden signed a minor league contract with the Cincinnati Reds organization. He made one start for the Pensacola Blue Wahoos of the Double–A Southern League, allowing 5 runs (4 earned) in 3 innings. Walden was released by the Reds organization on April 21, 2015.

=== Lancaster Barnstormers ===
Following his release from the Reds organization, Walden signed with the Lancaster Barnstormers of the Atlantic League of Professional Baseball, an independent baseball league. In 48 appearances for Lancaster, Walden compiled a 2.95 ERA with 49 strikeouts and 15 saves across 64 innings pitched.

=== Minnesota Twins ===
On December 19, 2015, Walden signed a minor league contract with the Minnesota Twins organization. He split time between the Double–A Chattanooga Lookouts and Triple–A Rochester Red Wings, appearing in a combined 42 games with a 2.40 ERA and 1.065 WHIP with six saves and 40 strikeouts in 56 1/3 innings pitched. Walden elected free agency following the season on November 7, 2016.

=== Boston Red Sox ===
On December 20, 2016, Walden signed with the Boston Red Sox. He pitched for the Triple-A Pawtucket Red Sox during the 2017 season, pitching 105 2/3 innings in 29 games (15 starts) with a 10–6 record, 3.92 ERA, and 1.306 WHIP while recording 86 strikeouts and 36 walks.

After pitching effectively during spring training, Walden was named to the Opening Day 25-man roster for the 2018 Boston Red Sox, expected to be the long reliever for rookie manager Alex Cora. Walden made his major league debut on April 1, pitching 1 1/3 innings of relief against the Tampa Bay Rays, giving up no runs and one hit while facing five batters. On April 14, he earned his first save, pitching three innings of relief in a 10–3 win over the Baltimore Orioles. He was sent down to the Triple-A Pawtucket Red Sox before the end of the month, was recalled very briefly in early May, and then spent the remainder of the season in the minors. With Boston, he appeared in a total of eight games with a 0–0 record and one save, while recording a 3.68 ERA and 14 strikeouts in 14 2/3 innings.

In 2019, Walden was optioned to Triple-A Pawtucket prior to Opening Day. He was called up on April 6, when Brian Johnson was placed on the injured list, and recorded his first MLB win the next day, pitching two innings of scoreless relief in a 1–0 win over the Arizona Diamondbacks. He was optioned back to Pawtucket effective on April 16, then recalled to Boston on April 19. Overall with the 2019 Red Sox, Walden appeared in 70 games, compiling a 9–2 record with 3.81 ERA and 76 strikeouts in 78 innings.

In 2020, Walden was on Boston's active roster at the delayed start of the season. He was optioned to the team's alternate training site on August 19, and recalled on September 3. Overall with the 2020 Red Sox, Walden appeared in 15 games, all in relief, compiling an 0–2 record with 9.45 ERA and 10 strikeouts in 13 1/3 innings pitched.

On February 24, 2021, Walden was designated for assignment by the Red Sox after the signing of Marwin González was made official. On March 1, Walden was outrighted to Triple-A and invited to spring training as a non-roster invitee. In 27 appearances for the Triple-A Worcester Red Sox, Walden recorded a 5–3 record with a 4.01 ERA and 40 strikeouts. On August 7, 2021, Walden was released by the Red Sox.

=== Chicago Cubs ===
On August 19, 2021, Walden signed a minor league deal with the Chicago Cubs.

=== Gastonia Honey Hunters ===
On April 20, 2022, Walden signed with the Gastonia Honey Hunters of the Atlantic League of Professional Baseball.

=== Milwaukee Brewers ===
On June 23, 2022, Walden signed a minor league deal with the Milwaukee Brewers. He made 16 appearances (9 starts) for the Triple-A Nashville Sounds, logging an 0–3 record and 4.53 ERA with 52 strikeouts in 59.2 innings pitched. Walden was released by the Brewers organization on December 16.

=== Gastonia Honey Hunters (second stint) ===
On April 28, 2023, Walden signed with the Gastonia Honey Hunters of the Atlantic League of Professional Baseball. He made 4 starts for Gastonia, logging a 2-1 record and 2.70 ERA with 24 strikeouts in 20.0 innings pitched.

=== Seattle Mariners ===
On May 22, 2023, Walden signed a minor league deal with the Seattle Mariners. In 17 games (14 starts) for the Triple–A Tacoma Rainiers, he compiled a 3–3 record and 5.65 ERA with 50 strikeouts across 71 2/3 innings pitched. Walden elected free agency following the season on November 6.

== Personal life ==
Walden and his wife, Nichole, have five children, Sutton, Palmer, Cash, Beckett and Crew. Walden and two business partners opened the DIB Baseball Academy in Fresno in 2015.
