= Nick Yorke =

American baseball player (born 2002)

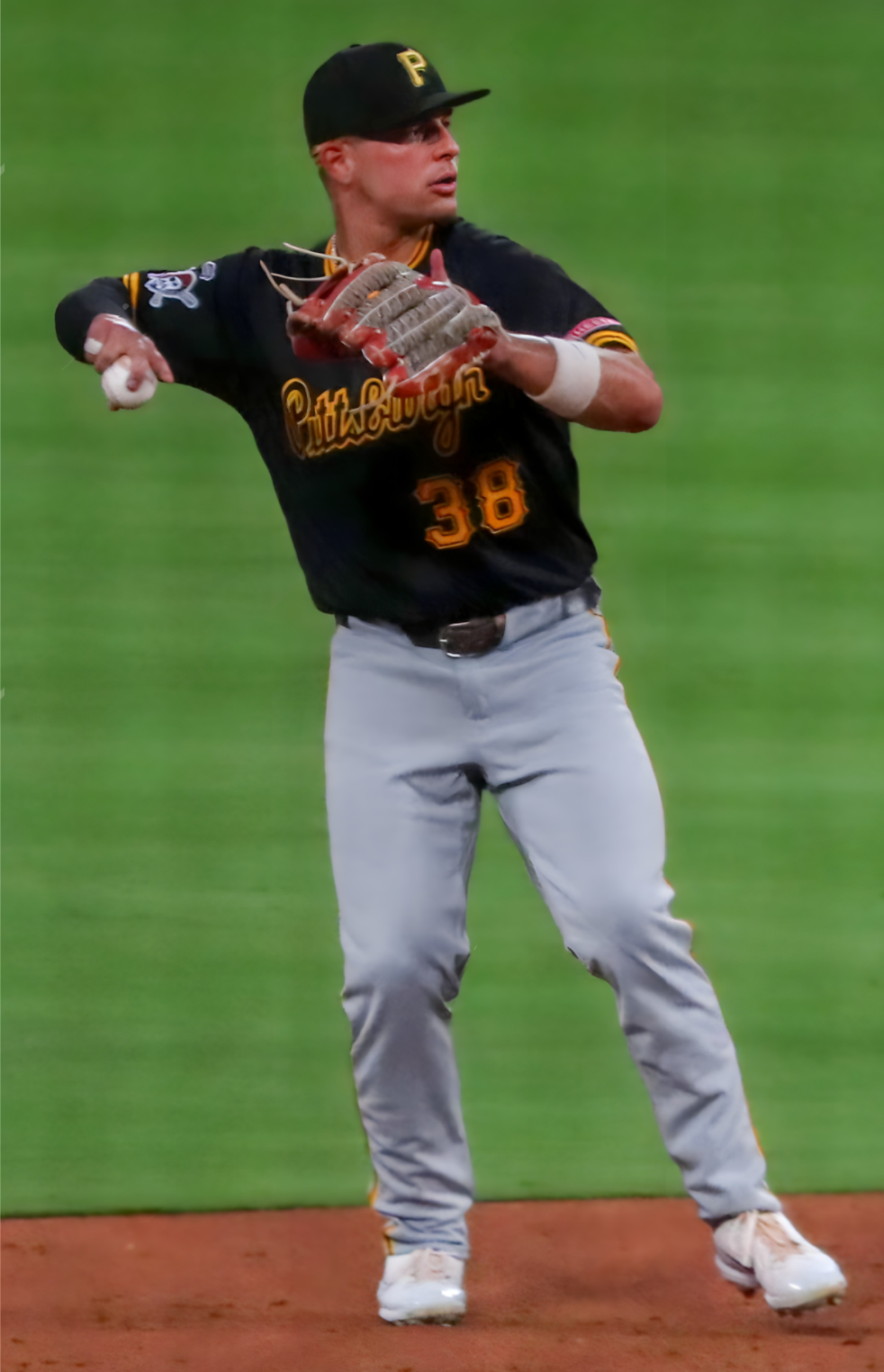
- Yorke with the Pittsburgh Pirates

Pittsburgh Pirates – No. 38
- Second baseman / Third baseman
- Born: April 2, 2002 (age 24); Newport Beach, California, U.S.
- Bats: Right Throws: Right

MLB debut
- September 16, 2024, for the Pittsburgh Pirates

MLB statistics (through 2026 season)
- Batting average: .219
- Home runs: 4
- Run batted in: 25
- Stats at Baseball Reference

Teams
- Pittsburgh Pirates (2024–present)

Nicholas Anthony Yorke (born April 2, 2002) is an American professional baseball second baseman for the Pittsburgh Pirates of Major League Baseball (MLB). He was selected by the Boston Red Sox with the 17th overall pick in the 2020 MLB draft. Yorke was traded to the Pirates in 2024 and made his major league debut later that year.

== Amateur career ==
Yorke attended Archbishop Mitty High School in San Jose, California, where he played baseball. He began his high school career as a shortstop, but moved to designated hitter after undergoing shoulder surgery.

In 2019, his junior year, he was named to The Mercury News All-Bay Area Team. Over his high school career, Yorke recorded a .457 batting average with 134 hits, 100 runs, and 77 runs batted in across 94 games.

He committed to play college baseball for the Arizona Wildcats before signing professionally.

== Professional career ==
=== Boston Red Sox ===
The Boston Red Sox selected Yorke with the 17th overall pick of the 2020 MLB draft, with MLB.com listing him as a second baseman. He signed with the Red Sox on July 7, 2020, for a $2.7 million bonus.

During the shortened 2020 season, the Red Sox added Yorke to their pool of reserve players on September 17. Although the minor league season was cancelled due to the COVID-19 pandemic, he was invited to participate in the Red Sox’ fall instructional league. Following the season, Baseball America ranked Yorke as the Red Sox’ ninth-best prospect.

In 2021, Yorke was a non-roster invitee to Red Sox spring training. He began the season with the Low-A Salem Red Sox. After hitting .323 with 10 home runs, 47 runs batted in (RBI), and 11 stolen bases in 19 attempts over 76 games, Yorke was promoted to the High-A Greenville Drive in late August. Over 21 games with Greenville, he batted .333 with four home runs and 15 RBI.

Yorke returned to Greenville to start the 2022 season. In May, he was ranked 33rd on Baseball America's list of the top 100 prospects in baseball. That season, he appeared in 80 games for Greenville, hitting .232/.303/.365 with 11 home runs, 45 RBI, and eight stolen bases in 12 attempts. After the season, he was selected to play in the Arizona Fall League.

Yorke spent the 2023 season with the Double-A Portland Sea Dogs, slashing .268/.350/.435 with 13 home runs, 61 RBI, and 18 stolen bases across 110 games. He returned to Portland to begin the 2024 season, ranked as the Red Sox’ number eight minor-league prospect by Baseball America. In June, Yorke was promoted to the Triple-A Worcester Red Sox, where he hit .310/.408/.490 with six home runs, 19 RBI, and six stolen bases over 38 games.

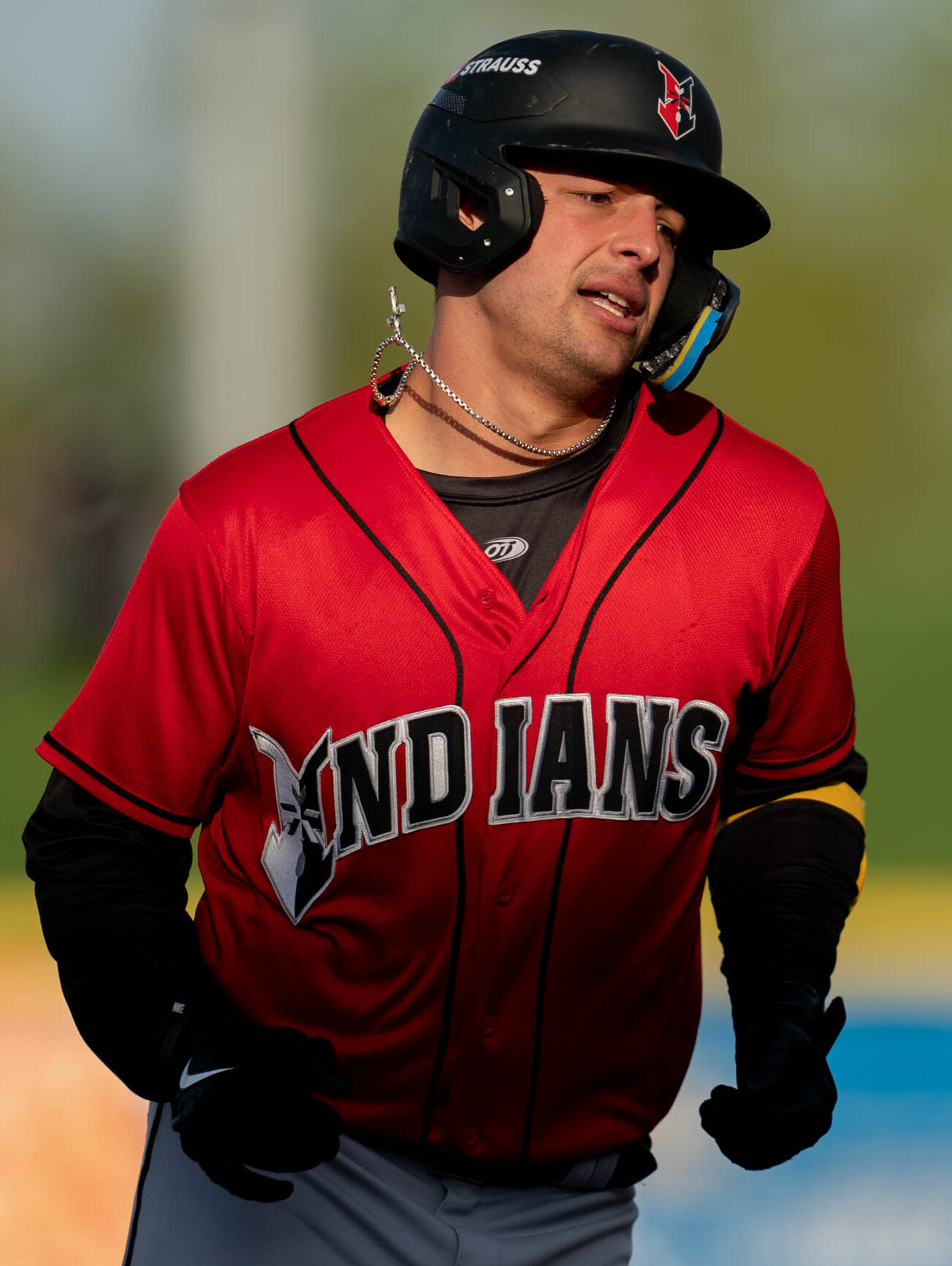
Yorke with the Indianapolis Indians in 2025

=== Pittsburgh Pirates ===
On July 29, 2024, the Red Sox traded Yorke to the Pittsburgh Pirates in exchange for pitcher Quinn Priester. He appeared in 40 games for the Triple-A Indianapolis Indians, slashing .355/.431/.507 with two home runs, 26 runs batted in (RBI), and seven stolen bases.

On September 16, the Pirates selected Yorke’s contract, adding him to the 40-man roster and promoting him to the major leagues for the first time. He made his debut that day, starting at second base and going 0-for-3. In 11 appearances during his rookie season, Yorke batted .216/.286/.378 with two home runs, five RBI, and two stolen bases.

Yorke was optioned to Triple-A Indianapolis to begin the 2025 season.

== Personal ==
Yorke's brothers, Zach and Joe, also play baseball. Zach is a first baseman for the LSU Tigers, and formerly served in the same role for the Grand Canyon Antelopes, while Joe played collegiately for the Boise State Broncos and the Cal Poly Mustangs.
