= Peter Fatse =

American baseball coach (born 1987)

- Coach
- Born: August 3, 1987 (age 39); Holyoke, Massachusetts, U.S.
- Bats: Left Throws: Right

Teams
- As coach: Boston Red Sox (2020–2026)

Peter C. Fatse (born August 3, 1987) is an American professional baseball coach and former player, most recently a hitting coach for the Boston Red Sox of Major League Baseball (MLB).

== Biography ==
Fatse is from Hampden, Massachusetts. He graduated from Minnechaug Regional High School in Wilbraham, Massachusetts, and then enrolled at the University of Connecticut, where he played college baseball for the Connecticut Huskies.

The Milwaukee Brewers selected Fatse in the 24th round of the 2009 MLB draft. He played for the Brewers' organization in Minor League Baseball for two years, as an outfielder, second baseman, and third baseman. He reached the High-A level with the Brevard County Manatees in 2010. He then played in independent baseball leagues for another two years, first with the Pittsfield Colonials of the Can-Am League in 2011, then with the Florence Freedom of the Frontier League in 2012. In his four years of professional baseball, Fatse batted .258 in 329 games, with 17 home runs and 170 RBI.

Fatse founded his own baseball academy, Advanced Performance Academy in Palmer, Massachusetts, in 2010. The Minnesota Twins hired him as their minor league hitting coordinator in January 2019. After the 2019 MLB season, the Boston Red Sox hired him as their assistant hitting coach, which was officially announced on October 31.

Fatse was named as the Red Sox's hitting coach on December 20, 2021, until he, Alex Cora, and the majority of the coaching staff was fired on April 25, 2026 due to a disappointing start to the season. Fatse joined the Tampa Bay Rays in June as a hitting consultant, and was hired by the Philadelphia Phillies in October to serve as lead hitting coach.

Sporting positions
Preceded by Tim Hyers	Boston Red Sox hitting coach 2022 – April 2026	Succeeded by John Soteropoulos
