= Marcus Wilson (baseball) =

American baseball player (born 1996)

- Outfielder
- Born: August 15, 1996 (age 30); Los Angeles, California, U.S.
- Batted: Right Threw: Right

MLB debut
- June 29, 2022, for the Seattle Mariners

Last MLB appearance
- July 4, 2022, for the Seattle Mariners

MLB statistics
- Batting average: .200
- Home runs: 0
- Runs batted in: 0
- Stats at Baseball Reference

Teams
- Seattle Mariners (2022)

Marcus Wilson (born August 15, 1996) is an American former professional baseball outfielder. He played in Major League Baseball (MLB) for the Seattle Mariners.

== Career ==
=== Arizona Diamondbacks ===
Wilson attended Junípero Serra High School in Gardena, California, where he also played high school football. He was drafted by the Arizona Diamondbacks in the second round of the 2014 Major League Baseball draft.

Wilson made his professional debut with the Arizona League Diamondbacks in 2014, appearing in 39 games while batting .206 with one home run and 22 RBIs. In 2015, he played for the Missoula Osprey, again recording one home run and 22 RBIs, while batting .258 in 57 games. He then split the 2016 season between the Hillsboro Hops and Kane County Cougars, batting an overall .252 with one home run and 20 RBIs in 69 games. Wilson returned to Kane County for 2017, appearing in 103 games while batting .295 with nine home runs and 54 RBIs. In 2018, he played 111 games for the Visalia Rawhide, recording 10 home runs and 48 RBIs with a .235 average. Wilson began the 2019 season with the Double-A Jackson Generals, appearing in 12 games before being traded.

=== Boston Red Sox ===
On April 19, 2019, the Diamondbacks traded Wilson to the Boston Red Sox for Blake Swihart. Wilson started his Red Sox career with the Double-A Portland Sea Dogs, and later spent two months with the Class A-Advanced Salem Red Sox before returning to Portland. Overall with three teams during 2019, Wilson appeared in 119 games while batting .269 with 18 home runs and 58 RBIs. After the season, he played in the Arizona Fall League.

The Red Sox added Wilson to their 40-man roster after the 2019 season. He was optioned to Double-A Portland on March 8, 2020, but did not play during the year due to cancellation of the minor league season. He played one game in the Mexican Pacific League during the 2020–21 winter season, but left after a league shutdown due to the COVID-19 pandemic in Mexico. Wilson began the 2021 season in Triple-A with the Worcester Red Sox. On July 30, the day of the trade deadline, Wilson was designated for assignment to make room on the 40-man roster for relief pitcher Hansel Robles.

=== Seattle Mariners ===
On August 2, 2021, Wilson was claimed off of waivers by the Seattle Mariners. He was assigned to the Triple-A Tacoma Rainiers. On October 22, Wilson was outrighted off of the 40-man roster.

On June 29, 2022, Wilson was selected to the 40-man roster and was promoted to the major leagues to fill in for the injured Taylor Trammell. He made his major league debut the same day as a pinch hitter versus the Baltimore Orioles. On July 4, Wilson collected his first career hit, a single off of Sean Manaea of the San Diego Padres. He was designated for assignment on July 30. On August 1, he was sent outright to Triple-A. On October 14, Wilson elected free agency.

=== Boston Red Sox (second stint) ===
On February 17, 2023, Wilson signed a minor-league contract with the Boston Red Sox organization. He received limited playing time with the Triple–A Worcester Red Sox, playing in 37 games and hitting .153/.265/.254 with 1 home run, 4 RBI, and 5 stolen bases. On July 25, Wilson was released by Boston.

On March 10, 2024, Wilson announced his retirement from professional baseball.
