= Tim Hyers =

American baseball player & coach (born 1971)

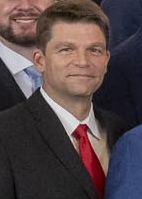
- Hyers at the White House in 2024

Atlanta Braves – No. 80
- Coach / First baseman
- Born: October 3, 1971 (age 54); Atlanta, Georgia, U.S.
- Batted: Left Threw: Left

MLB debut
- April 4, 1994, for the San Diego Padres

Last MLB appearance
- August 5, 1999, for the Florida Marlins

MLB statistics
- Batting average: .217
- Home runs: 2
- Runs batted in: 19
- Stats at Baseball Reference

Teams
- As player: San Diego Padres (1994–1995); Detroit Tigers (1996); Florida Marlins (1999); As coach: Los Angeles Dodgers (2016–2017); Boston Red Sox (2018–2021); Texas Rangers (2022–2024); Atlanta Braves (2025–present)

Career highlights and awards
- World Series champion (2018, 2023)

Timothy James Hyers (born October 3, 1971) is an American former professional baseball first baseman and current hitting coach for the Atlanta Braves of Major League Baseball (MLB). He played in MLB for the San Diego Padres, Detroit Tigers, and Florida Marlins. He has also served as the hitting coach for the Los Angeles Dodgers, Boston Red Sox, and Texas Rangers.

== Playing career ==
Hyers attended Newton County High School in Georgia and was selected in the second round by the Toronto Blue Jays in the 1990 Major League Baseball draft.

During his ten-year (1990–99) minor league career in the Blue Jays, Padres, Arizona Diamondbacks and Marlins organizations, he batted .261 with 847 hits.

Hyers was selected in the Rule 5 draft by the San Diego Padres in 1993, playing in 54 major league games the following season, while recording a .254 batting average, seven runs batted in, and nine walks in 118 at bats. After six games with the Padres in 1995, Hyers signed with the Detroit Tigers and recorded two hits in 26 at-bats. Hyers returned to the major leagues in 1999 with 81 at-bats for the Florida Marlins, hitting .222 with four doubles and twelve RBI. He threw and batted left-handed, stood 6 feet 1 inch (1.85 m) tall and weighed 185 pounds (84 kg). In total, Hyers batted .217 with two home runs and 17 runs batted in in 133 games played during his MLB career.

== Post-playing career ==
After retiring from the playing ranks, Hyers worked as a hitting coach in the Tigers' farm system, and also taught physical education at Victory Christian School in Conyers, Georgia. He then was an area scout for the Boston Red Sox in Georgia during 2009–2012. In 2013, Hyers was appointed the Red Sox' minor league hitting coordinator and served three seasons in that post. During the 2014 season, he served as interim hitting coach for the Red Sox, while Greg Colbrunn was recovering from a cerebral hemorrhage.

Hyers returned to MLB full-time when he was named assistant hitting coach of the Los Angeles Dodgers for the 2016 season, serving under new manager Dave Roberts. Hyers was a member of Roberts' staff through the 2017 season. On November 4, 2017, Hyers was named hitting coach of the Boston Red Sox on the staff of new manager Alex Cora. Hyers served as hitting coach for the Red Sox through the 2021 season, including the team's 2018 championship. On November 1, 2021, Hyers declined the team's offer to return for the 2022 season. On November 10, 2021, he was named the hitting coach of the Texas Rangers. Hyers joined the Atlanta Braves in the same role on October 24, 2024.

== Personal life ==
Hyers is the eldest of three sons of parents James and Brenda Hyers. Tim Hyers and his wife Kristin raised three children.

Sporting positions
Preceded by Greg Colbrunn	Boston Red Sox hitting coach 2014 (interim)	Succeeded by Greg Colbrunn
Preceded by John Valentin	Los Angeles Dodgers assistant hitting coach 2016–2017	Succeeded by Luis Ortiz/Brant Brown
Preceded by Chili Davis	Boston Red Sox hitting coach 2018–2021	Succeeded by Peter Fatse
Preceded by Luis Ortiz	Texas Rangers hitting coach 2022–2024	Succeeded by Bret Boone
Preceded by Kevin Seitzer	Atlanta Braves hitting coach 2025–present	Succeeded by Incumbent
