= Chaim Bloom =

American baseball executive (born 1983)

St. Louis Cardinals
- President of baseball operations
- Born: February 27, 1983 (age 43); Philadelphia, Pennsylvania, U.S.

Teams
- Tampa Bay Rays (2005–2019); Boston Red Sox (2020–2023); St. Louis Cardinals (2024–present)

Chaim David Bloom ([ħajˈjiːm]; born February 27, 1983) is an American professional baseball executive who is the president of baseball operations for the St. Louis Cardinals of Major League Baseball (MLB). He began his MLB career in 2005 with the Tampa Bay Rays, reaching the title of Senior Vice President of Baseball Operations. From 2020 to 2023, he was Chief Baseball Officer for the Boston Red Sox. In 2024, Bloom joined the Cardinals as an advisor to then-president of baseball operations John Mozeliak and succeeded him in his role after the 2025 season.

== Early life and career ==
Bloom is from Philadelphia, Pennsylvania. He is Jewish, and keeps kosher. His father, Benjamin Bloom, is an ophthalmologist, and his mother, Esther Stern-Bloom, is a retired Hebrew and French teacher. He attended Jewish day schools, first at Solomon Schechter Day School of Philadelphia (now known as Perelman Jewish Day School), and then at Akiba Hebrew Academy (now known as Jack M. Barrack Hebrew Academy) in Greater Philadelphia, graduating in 2000. In 2004, Bloom received a bachelor's degree in Latin Classics from Yale College, where he was a member of The Society of Orpheus and Bacchus.

Bloom's first entry into the baseball world was an article in Baseball Prospectus in 1997, and he continued writing for it until he joined the Rays. Prior to joining the Rays, he was a baseball operations intern for the San Diego Padres and a legal/corporate partnerships intern for Major League Baseball.

== Major League Baseball career ==
=== Tampa Bay Rays ===
Bloom began working for the Tampa Bay Rays in February 2005 as an intern, was hired by the Rays full-time to work in Minor League Operations in October 2005. He was promoted to assistant director of Minor League Operations in 2008, with responsibility for all aspects of the team's minor league system, including player evaluation and assignments, expansion of video, strength and conditioning, mental skills initiatives, creating of the "Rays Way" player development manual, and executing individual development plans for the organization's prospects. He was named Director of Baseball Operations in 2011, expanding his job to include contract negotiations, salary arbitration, budgeting, and overseeing major league support staff and international scouting. In 2014, when general manager Andrew Friedman left the Rays organization, the Rays promoted Bloom to Vice President of Baseball Operations. His responsibilities expanded to include his overseeing domestic and international player development, a newly created baseball performance science department, trade negotiations, pro, amateur, and international scouting philosophy, personnel additions and changes throughout baseball operations, and short- and long-term strategic planning. He was named Senior Vice President of Baseball Operations in 2016, second in command behind President of Baseball Operations Matthew Silverman.

Despite a low Tampa Bay payroll, Bloom consistently fielded competitive teams. The franchise had been one of the most innovative under his management; he integrated analytics into all aspects of the game. He was an early user of breakthrough strategies, now more widely used, such as a much heavier emphasis on shifts and the use of openers (starting games with relief pitchers). Bloom is also known for his prowess in developing starting pitchers. He wrote the "Rays Way" player development handbook in 2008; and during his tenure with the Rays sportswriter Tom Verducci opined that "no franchise understands better how to identify, develop and maintain quality pitchers."

In 2015, Bloom interviewed for the general manager position with the Milwaukee Brewers and Philadelphia Phillies; in 2016 with the Minnesota Twins; and 2018 with the San Francisco Giants and New York Mets. Bloom was a finalist for the Mets' position. In 2019, he interviewed for the Boston Red Sox' head of baseball operations position.

=== Boston Red Sox ===
On October 25, 2019, the Red Sox hired the 36-year-old Bloom as Chief Baseball Officer, succeeding Dave Dombrowski as head of their baseball operations, with Brian O'Halloran to be named general manager and reporting to him. The Red Sox made an official announcement on October 28, an off-day of the 2019 World Series. In 2019, Bloom's Tampa Bay team had the lowest payroll on opening day at $49 million, while Dombrowski's Boston had the highest at $187 million. Bloom's Rays were 96–66 and made the playoffs, while the Dombrowski-led Red Sox were 84–78 and did not make the playoffs. Since the Red Sox were trying to reduce salary and get under the luxury tax threshold for the 2020 season and in the future, Bloom was hired because of his experience at managing a low payroll on the Rays.

Bloom's first season with Boston was the start-delayed and shortened 2020 season; the Red Sox had a record of 24–36 and finished in last place in the American League East. Bloom subsequently hired Alex Cora to return as the team's manager after fulfilling his suspension, announced in November 2020. While the 2021 Red Sox reached the American League Championship Series, the Red Sox play declined and their standing in the AL East diminished. They also saw popular and productive players Mookie Betts and Xander Bogaerts leave the team during Bloom's tenure; he was fired by the team on September 14, 2023. The Red Sox had a record of 267–262 during his time as Chief Baseball Officer.

=== St. Louis Cardinals ===
After the 2023 season, the St. Louis Cardinals hired Bloom as an advisor to president of baseball operations John Mozeliak.

On September 30, 2024, the Cardinals announced that Bloom would succeed Mozeliak as the team's president of baseball operations following the 2025 season. The Cardinals and Bloom signed a five-year deal.

== Personal life ==
Bloom and his wife, Aliza (née Hochman), met at Yale, where she earned a B.A. in economics and international studies. They have three children. While working with the Rays, Bloom and his family lived in St. Petersburg, Florida, close to Tropicana Field, in part so he could easily return on Friday nights to celebrate the Sabbath with his family.
