= Brian O'Halloran (baseball) =

American professional baseball executive

Boston Red Sox
- Executive VP of baseball operations
- Born: October 28, 1971 (age 53); Weymouth, Massachusetts, U.S.

Teams
- Boston Red Sox (2002–present)

Brian O'Halloran (born October 28, 1971) is an American sports executive with the Boston Red Sox of Major League Baseball (MLB). After serving as general manager of the team under Chaim Bloom during the 2020–2023 seasons, O'Halloran accepted a position as executive vice president of baseball operations following Bloom's dismissal in September 2023.

== Biography ==
O'Halloran has degrees from Colby College and UCLA. His first job in baseball was as an intern for the San Diego Padres.

O'Halloran joined the Boston Red Sox in 2002 as a baseball operations assistant, and became the director of baseball operations in 2006. He was named a vice president and assistant general manager for the team in November 2011. He became a senior vice president in 2015, and was promoted to executive vice president in November 2018.

On October 25, 2019, O'Halloran was reportedly named the Red Sox' new general manager, at the same time that Chaim Bloom was named Chief Baseball Officer, with O’Halloran reporting to him. An official announcement was made on October 28, an off-day of the 2019 World Series. Under Bloom and O'Halloran, the 2021 Red Sox reached the American League Championship Series, but the team regressed in the standings, posting an overall record of 267–262 under their leadership, and saw popular and productive players Mookie Betts and Xander Bogaerts leave the team. Bloom was fired by the team on September 14, 2023; at the same time, O'Halloran was removed as general manager. The team subsequently announced that O'Halloran accepted a position as executive vice president of baseball operations.

== Personal life ==
In addition to English, O'Halloran speaks Georgian and Russian; he previously studied in Georgia and worked in Moscow. O'Halloran and his wife, Jean, have three children.
