= Opener (baseball) =

Pitching role in baseball

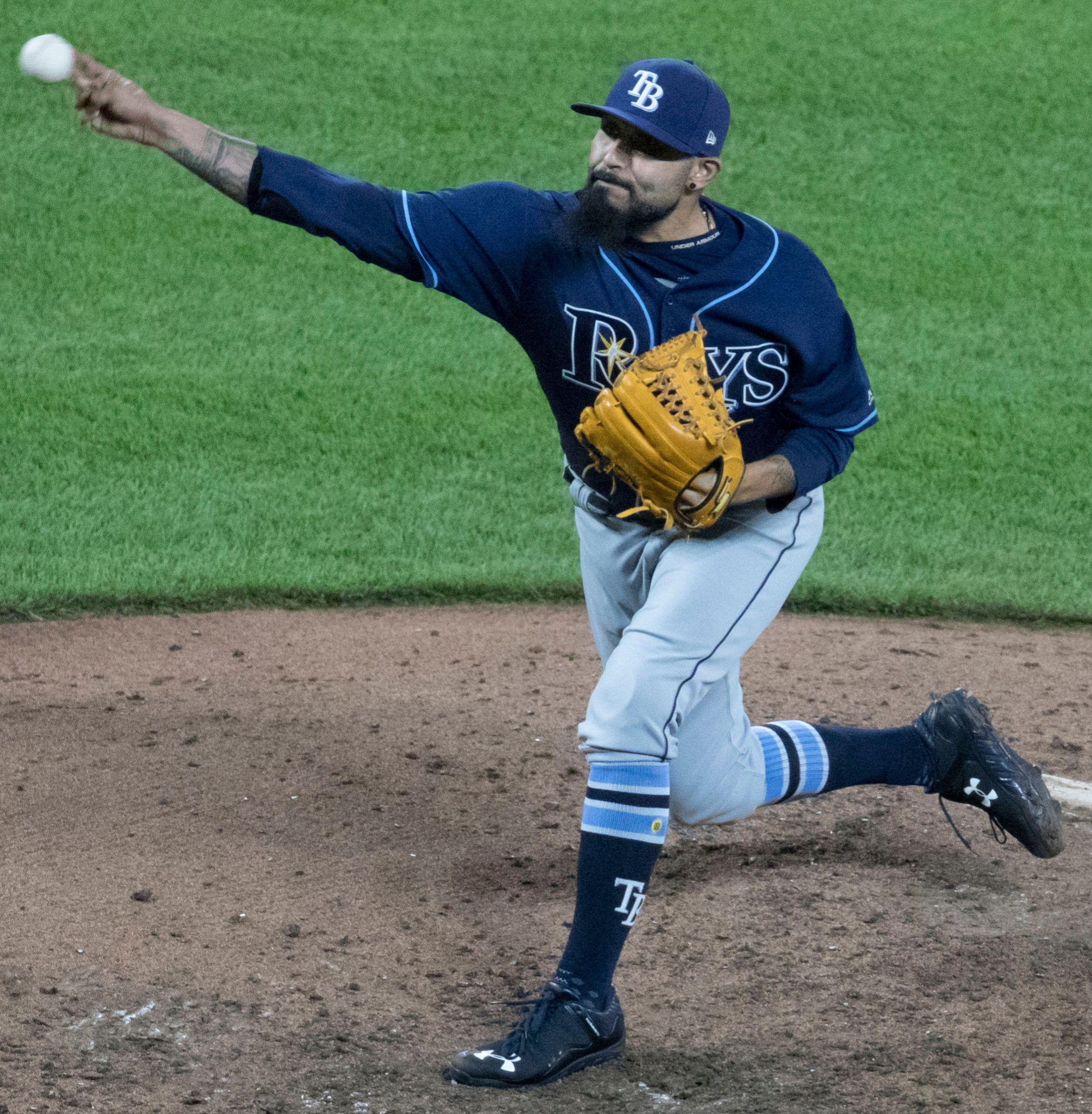
Sergio Romo's emergence as an opener popularized the practice in 2018.

In baseball, an opening pitcher, more frequently referred to as an opener, is a pitcher who begins a game, but is expected to get only a few outs before being replaced by a long reliever (or follower), in contrast with starting pitchers, who are traditionally expected to pitch as many innings as possible before being replaced. The name "opener" is a reference to the more established term "closer," which refers to a relief pitcher who typically works the final inning of a game. Like closers, openers typically pitch one inning before being replaced.

The strategy was frequently employed by the Tampa Bay Rays during the 2018 Major League Baseball season and the San Francisco Giants during the 2023 Major League Baseball season. Ahead of the 2024 season, the Commissioner's Office proposed banning the opener, after which the use of openers fell significantly.

== Overview ==
=== Theoretical background ===
By the 1980s, MLB teams had adopted starting rotations consisting of five starting pitchers, with all other pitchers on the active roster serving as relief pitchers. Traditionally, a starter was expected to throw the most innings of any pitcher in a game. Starters typically pitched until they became ineffective, reached a pitch count threshold, or finished the game.

In 2016, fantasy sports contest champion Steven Neistein had meetings with the Tampa Bay Rays to discuss ways for them to compete in a division with the New York Yankees and Boston Red Sox, despite having one of the lowest payrolls in MLB. The theory was that, if the opposition didn’t know who would pitch “the bulk” of the innings after the starter pitched the first inning or two, there would be a competitive advantage. Neistein’s game theories and algorithms on the approach of lineup construction paved the concept of “the opener” which has since been used by all 30 teams in the MLB at some point since.

In the 21st century, baseball writers advanced the idea that starting pitchers are less effective against the opposing team's hitters the more times in a game they face them. Dave Fleming, a writer for Bill James Online, wrote in 2009 about a proposed "3-3-3 rotation" where pitchers would be limited to throwing three innings in a game. Bryan Grosnick, writing for SB Nation's Beyond the Box Score, suggested using an opening pitcher for an inning or two before giving way to a more traditional starting pitcher in a 2013 article. In his 2016 book, Ahead of the Curve, Brian Kenny suggested the possible use of an opening pitcher, noting that the highest scoring inning is typically the first inning, so a team should use a relief pitcher to shut down the top of the opposing team's batting order.

=== Advantages ===
One advantage of the strategy is that the opener, who is often a hard-throwing specialist, can be called in to face the most dangerous hitters, who are usually near the top of the batting order, the first time they come to bat. On average, the first inning is the highest-scoring of a baseball game, because it is "the only inning that the offense can guarantee that the top of its lineup, which [contains] its best hitters, will appear." If the opener is successful, the job of the next pitcher is easier since they will start by facing less-dangerous hitters. The strategy also throws off the timing of the top-of-the-order hitters, who are not used to seeing different pitchers each time they come to bat, and allows the follower to face the top of the lineup two times rather than three.

From a financial perspective, the strategy allows teams to make more use of relief pitchers who are still under low-paying contracts, potentially reducing the salaries paid to starting pitchers because the latter are used less. Also, pitchers not starting games causes them to be less likely to receive win–loss decisions or receive as many "games started," which greatly affects subsequent arbitration hearings and financial compensation in future contract negotiations.

As a practical matter, teams are more likely to use openers when several of their starting pitchers are injured, such as the Los Angeles Dodgers in 2018 and the New York Yankees in 2019.

=== Disadvantages ===
Traditional starting pitchers tend to dislike following openers. The San Francisco Chronicle noted that starters "value their routines and careful preparation aimed at a certain day, plus the automatic built-in rest" from pitching only once five days.

The San Francisco Giants relied heavily on openers during the 2023 season. Starting pitcher Ross Stripling explained that the Giants employed an opener for him because they felt he was not pitching as well as ace Logan Webb, and suggested that in the future, free agent starting pitchers might think twice about signing with the Giants due to the risk of reputational damage from being subjected to an opener. The following year, the Giants did not use openers as frequently.

== Antecedents ==
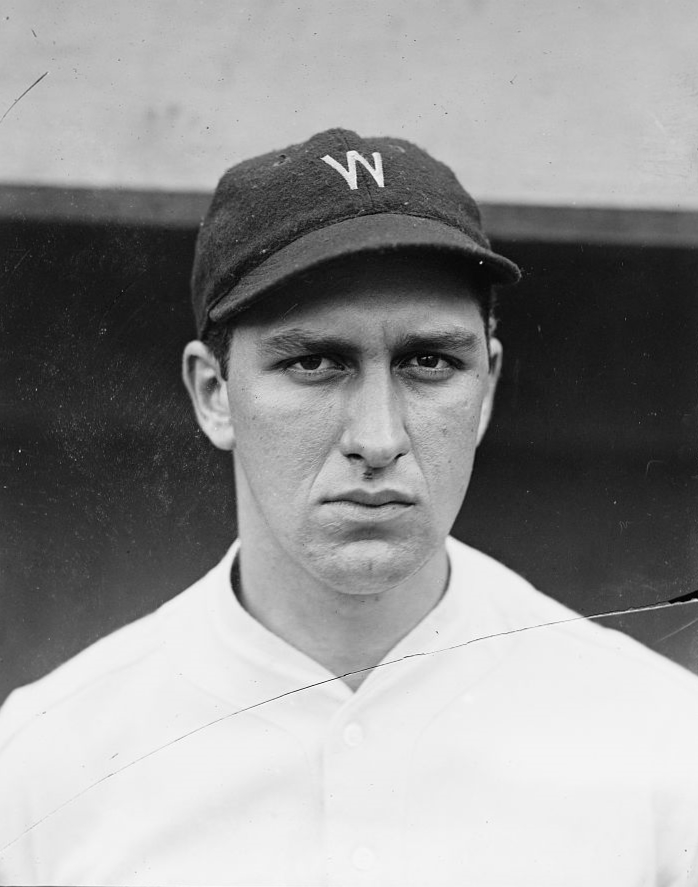
Curly Ogden pitched for the Washington Senators in the 1924 World Series.

Early uses of an opener often involved attempts to influence the other team's batting lineup. In Game 7 of the 1924 World Series, the Washington Senators had their starting pitcher, the right-handed Curly Ogden, pitch to only two batters and then brought in a left-handed pitcher, with the intent of locking the opposing team into their left-handed lineup. Similarly, in Game 6 of the 1990 National League Championship Series, the Pittsburgh Pirates decided to open the game with right-handed relief pitcher Ted Power before installing the announced starting pitcher, left-hander Zane Smith, in an attempt to get the Cincinnati Reds to change their batting lineup.

A notable early use of the opener to improve pitching performance took place in 1993, when the Oakland Athletics had a poor starting rotation. Manager Tony La Russa and pitching coach Dave Duncan split their pitchers into platoons, with a core of dedicated relief pitchers. Though the experiment lasted for only six games before the Athletics returned to a traditional starting rotation, Ron Darling, a member of the 1993 Athletics, called it "a precursor to all the things that you see today".

La Russa and Duncan also used an opener on the last day of the 2007 Major League Baseball season when their St. Louis Cardinals handed the ball to Troy Percival, a longtime closer with 358 career saves and 702 relief appearances, to make his only career start. Percival worked an inning before being relieved by Kip Wells, a traditional starting pitcher. However, La Russa's strategy more closely resembled a full-scale bullpen game, as Wells threw only three (scoreless) innings and 42 pitches before being replaced by Braden Looper. The Cardinals used ten pitchers in that game.

== Emergence and subsequent use ==
=== 2018 season ===
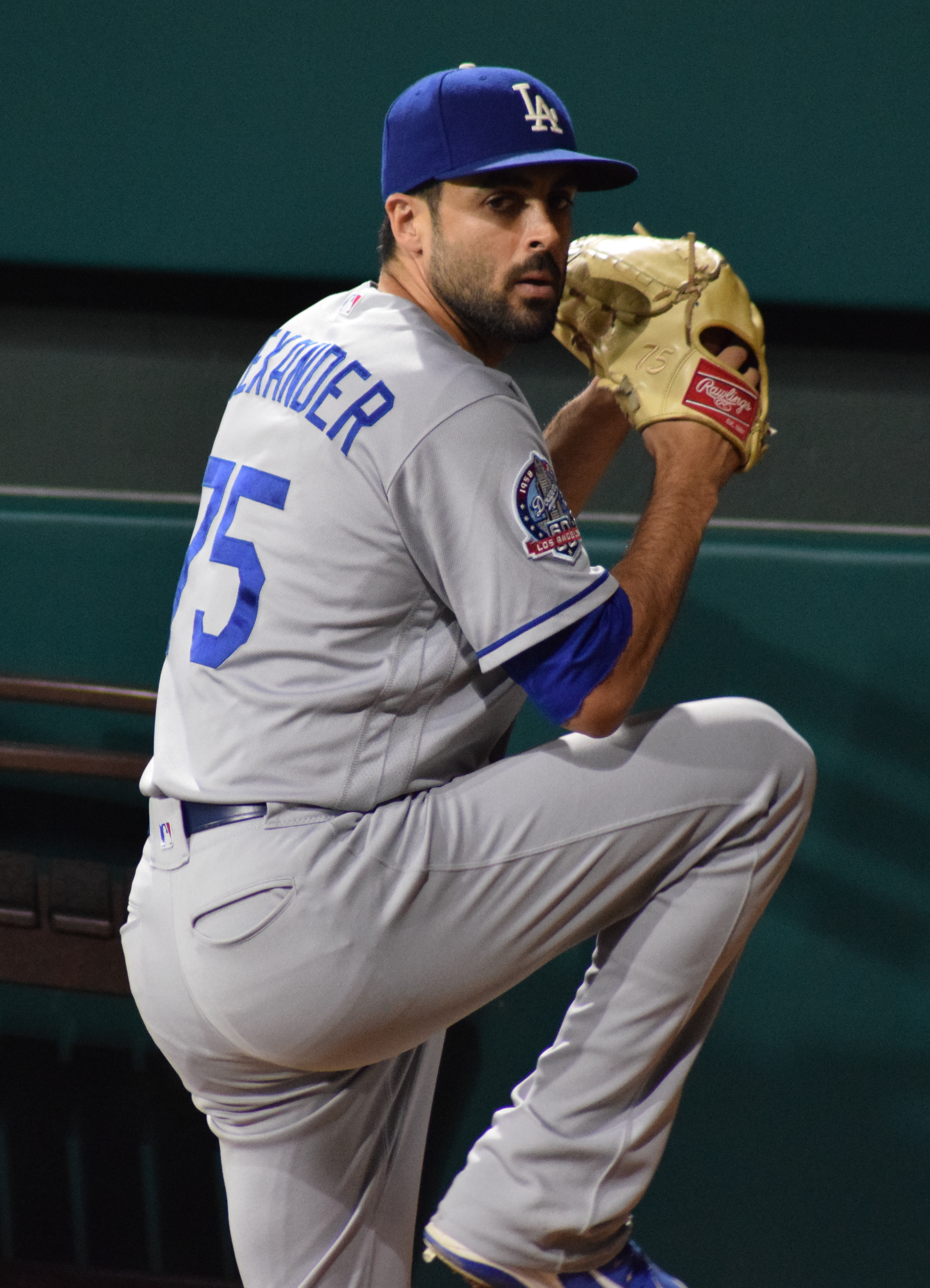
The Los Angeles Dodgers' Scott Alexander was one of the first non-Rays pitchers to open a game.

The Tampa Bay Rays began experimenting with an opener on May 19 of the 2018 season, when they were 15–18. The first pitcher they chose to deploy as the opener was Sergio Romo, a veteran reliever who previously served as a closer. Romo returned to open the game on May 22 and 23. The Rays returned Romo to their closer role in June, but continued to use an opener. Typically, one of Ryne Stanek, Diego Castillo, and Hunter Wood started the game before being replaced by Ryan Yarbrough, Yonny Chirinos, or Jalen Beeks. The Rays did not use an opener when their ace, Blake Snell, was the starting pitcher.

The Rays saw their team earned run average (ERA) decrease after beginning to use the strategy. The Rays' openers recorded a 3.97 ERA in a combined 93 innings pitched, which bested the league average ERA of 4.15. During the summer, the Rays also experimented with an opener in their Double-A and Triple-A affiliates. The Rays played much better baseball after introducing the opener, rallying from 15–18 to finish 90–72, their first winning season since 2013. However, they missed the playoffs.

The opener spread to other teams in 2018. In June, the Los Angeles Dodgers used Scott Alexander as an opener due to injuries in their starting rotation. The Minnesota Twins, Oakland Athletics, and Texas Rangers also employed openers in the last month of the 2018 season. (Note: The Milwaukee Brewers used the strategy just for the lead-off batter in a September 24 game, bringing in reliever Dan Jennings to pitch to Matt Carpenter of the St. Louis Cardinals.)

In the nine games in which the Athletics used the opener strategy in September (with Liam Hendriks serving as opener in eight of those games), they posted a win–loss record of 4–5 and a 1.86 ERA. The Athletics also chose to use Hendriks as the opener, unsuccessfully, in the 2018 American League Wild Card Game. In the 2018 National League Championship Series, the Milwaukee Brewers used starter Wade Miley as an opener in Game 5. He pitched to only one batter before being replaced, becoming just the second pitcher in MLB playoff history to start a game and face only one batter. (Note: Johnny Cueto of the Cincinnati Reds was pulled in Game 1 of the 2012 National League Division Series between the Reds and San Francisco Giants after facing one hitter, due to back spasms.)

When Dodgers general manager Farhan Zaidi took over the San Francisco Giants front office after the 2018 season, he spoke about using an opener to protect Dereck Rodriguez and Andrew Suarez from being overworked.

=== 2019 season ===
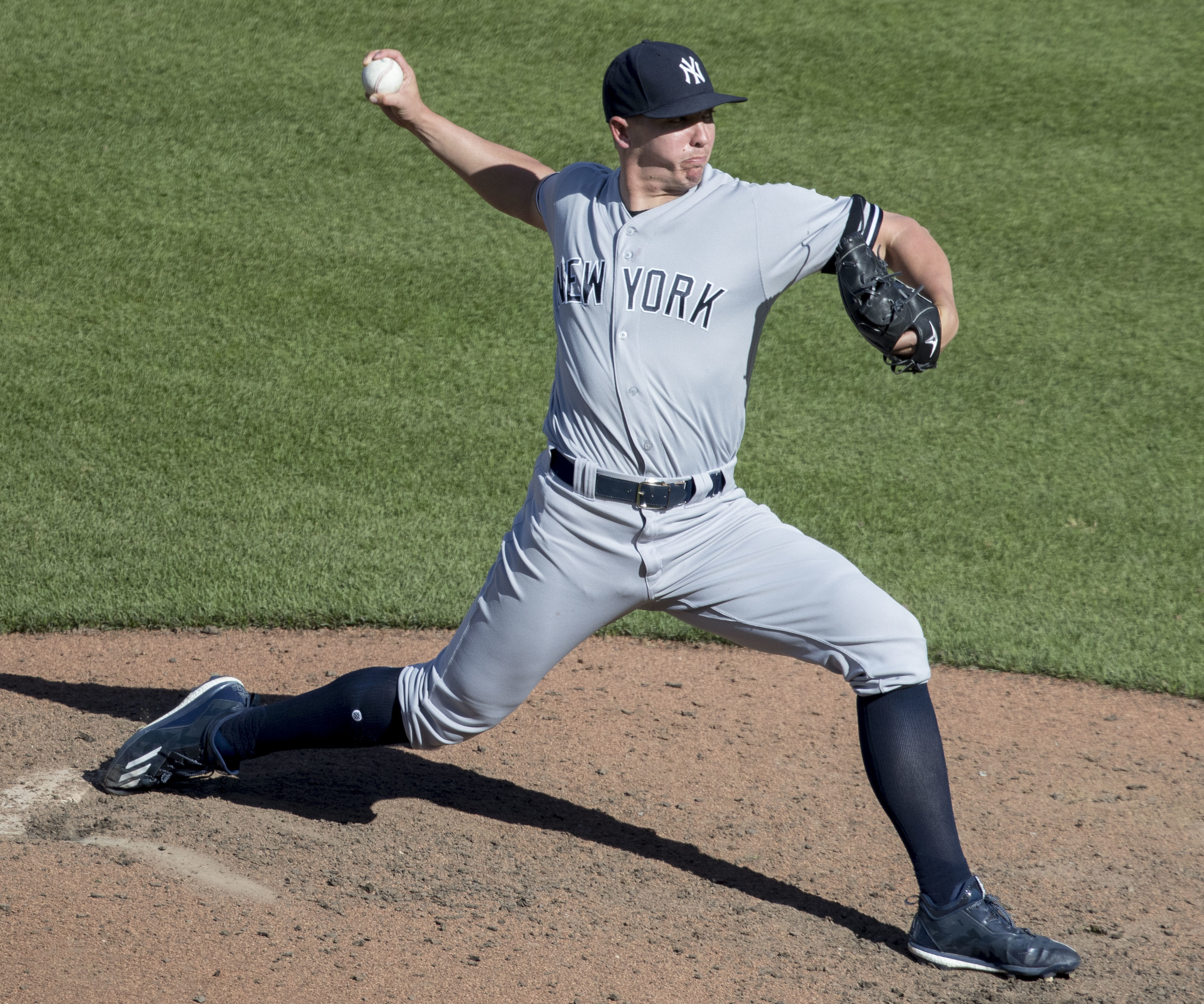
Chad Green was a successful opener with the New York Yankees during the 2019 season.

The Tampa Bay Rays continued to use an opener in many of their games, with Ryne Stanek often filling the role. In May 2019, MLB.com's Mike Petriello calculated that the Rays had employed 42 openers since the start of the 2018 season, more than every other team combined. No other team had used more than 7 openers. On July 12, the Los Angeles Angels pitched a no-hitter using an opener, with Taylor Cole working the first two innings and Félix Peña the last seven in a 13–0 win against the Seattle Mariners.

The New York Yankees coped with having three of their starting pitchers on the injured list by using reliever Chad Green as an opener. Green would pitch the first inning or two and then hand over the game to a long reliever. During the 2019 regular season, Green opened 15 games for the Yankees; the Yankees won 11 of the games that he started.

=== 2020–2023 seasons ===
In the following years, MLB teams continued to use the opener, but not as often as in 2019. In 2024, FanGraphs' Jon Becker calculated that MLB teams used openers at least 80 times every season from 2018 to 2024, with peaks in 2019 (165 openers) and 2023 (154), with the exception of the coronavirus-shortened 2020 season. For reference, a typical 162-game regular season will play 2,430 games, with 4,860 starting pitchers.

Despite being a well-known proponent of openers, the Tampa Bay Rays made the 2020 World Series but did not use a single conventional opener in that matchup. Instead, the Rays and their opponent Los Angeles Dodgers both resorted to bullpen games. Swingman Ryan Yarbrough started Game 4 for the Rays and threw 3.1 innings before the bullpen took over, while the Dodgers used reliever Tony Gonsolin to "open" Games 2 and 6. The Rays won Yarbrough's start, and the two teams split Gonsolin's starts.

During the 2023 season, San Francisco Giants manager Gabe Kapler resorted to openers three out of every five days, with Logan Webb and Alex Cobb starting their games as usual. Kapler tweaked the strategy by sending openers out for longer than one inning. That year, the Giants recorded a 4.02 team ERA (tenth-best in the majors) and a 3.92 team FIP that year (fourth-best).

== Decline ==
Before the 2024 season, Commissioner Rob Manfred said that he wanted to disincentivize the practice and refocus on traditional starting pitchers. Manfred's view was attributed to a broader desire to increase offense and decrease injuries, as pitchers may throw harder and risk ligament damage if they are on a strict pitch count. Before the start of the season, a rule was proposed that would have required most starting pitchers to throw at least six innings, although it was shelved for the time being.

Even with no rule change, uses of openers by MLB teams fell sharply during the 2024 season. Only 9 openers had started games by May 2024, putting MLB on pace for a 33-opener season. Jon Becker noted that the change may have come from the teams themselves, rather than from the Commissioner's Office. The San Francisco Giants fired manager Gabe Kapler, a strong proponent of openers, and the Tampa Bay Rays had more starting pitcher depth than the previous year, not unlike the 2020 team.

In addition, openers have been replaced (at least partially) by full-scale bullpen games. Under manager Dave Roberts, the Los Angeles Dodgers had previously used openers in response to injuries in their starting rotation. However, after a similar crisis in the 2024 season, Roberts resorted to bullpen games during the 2024 postseason. The Dodgers went 2–2 in those bullpen games.

== Bullpen game ==
A bullpen game, often referred to as a bullpen day, is a pitching strategy where a team uses only relief pitchers instead of a traditional starting pitcher, to grant respite to starting rotation facing injuries or fatigue. It differs from the opener strategy, as in that the opening reliever is followed by a long reliever, whereas in a bullpen game, many relievers are used, typically pitching a couple innings each.
