= Stone Garrett =

American baseball player (born 1995)

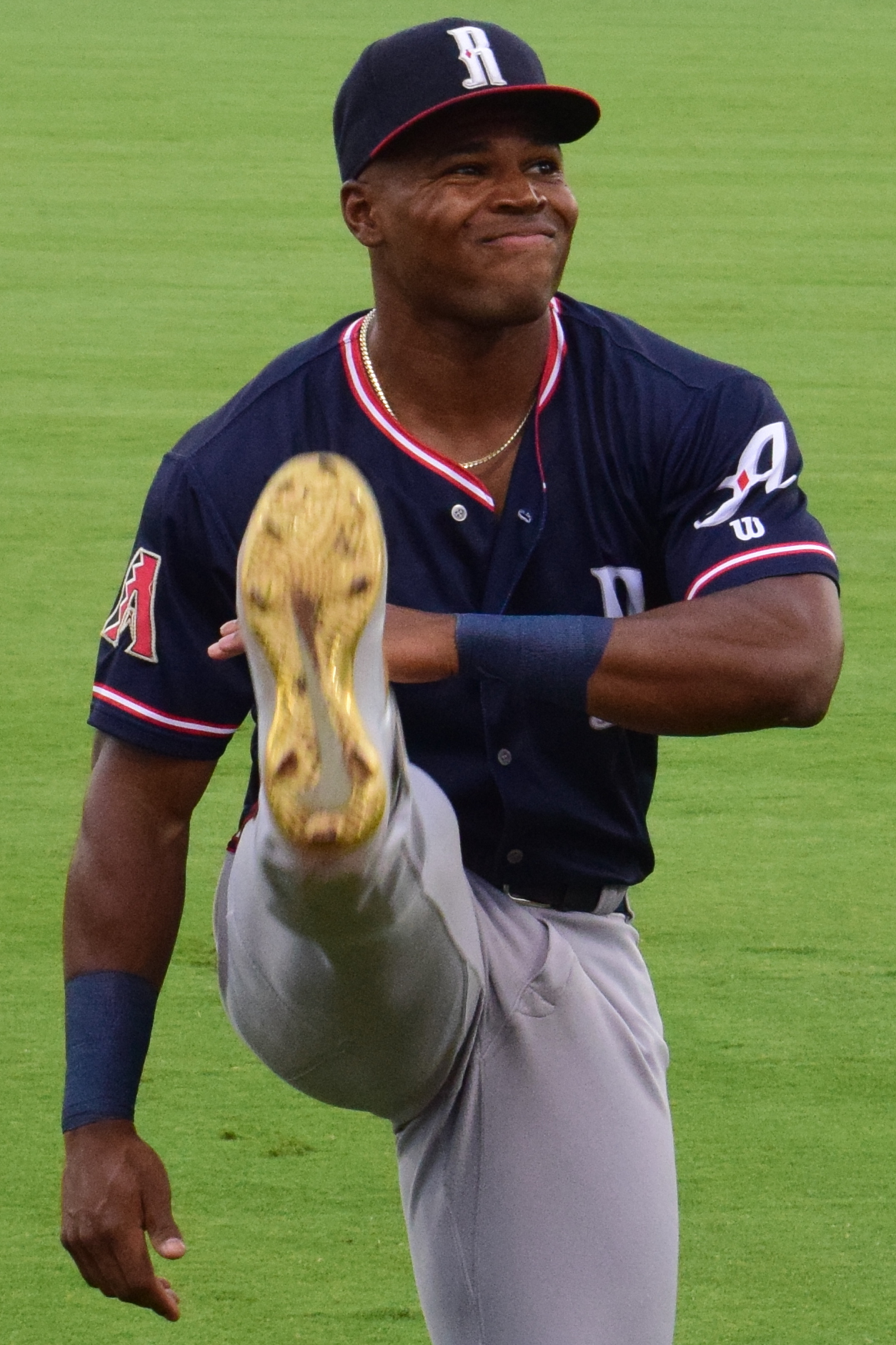
- Garrett with the Reno Aces in 2022
- Outfielder
- Born: November 22, 1995 (age 30); Sugar Land, Texas, U.S.
- Batted: Right Threw: Right

Professional debut
- MLB: August 17, 2022, for the Arizona Diamondbacks
- KBO: June 12, 2025, for the Kiwoom Heroes

Last appearance
- MLB: September 29, 2024, for the Washington Nationals
- KBO: July 20, 2025, for the Kiwoom Heroes

MLB statistics
- Batting average: .276
- Home runs: 14
- Runs batted in: 53

KBO statistics
- Batting average: .241
- Home runs: 2
- Runs batted in: 15
- Stats at Baseball Reference

Teams
- Arizona Diamondbacks (2022); Washington Nationals (2023–2024); Kiwoom Heroes (2025)

Gregory Stone Garrett (born November 22, 1995) is an American former professional baseball outfielder. He played in Major League Baseball (MLB) for the Arizona Diamondbacks and Washington Nationals, and in the KBO League for the Kiwoom Heroes.

== Career ==
=== Miami Marlins ===
Garrett was drafted by the Miami Marlins in the eighth round of the 2014 Major League Baseball draft out of George Ranch High School in Richmond, Texas. He signed with the Marlins rather than play college baseball at Rice University. He made his professional debut with the Gulf Coast Marlins. Playing with the Low-A Batavia Muckdogs in 2015, Garrett was named the Marlins Minor League Player of the Year after hitting .297 with a .933 On-base plus slugging (OPS), 11 home runs and 46 runs batted in.

Garrett spent 2016 with the Single–A Greensboro Grasshoppers where he posted a .213 batting average with six home runs and 16 RBI in 52 games. While with Greensboro, Garrett was involved in a prank with his then-roommate Josh Naylor. As a result of the prank, Garrett suffered a knife cut on his right hand that required three stitches, and was placed on the disabled list. In 2017, he played for the High–A Jupiter Hammerheads where he batted .212 with four home runs and 29 RBI in 94 games.

Garrett returned to Jupiter for the 2018 season, appearing in 64 games and hitting .243/.280/.371 with 5 home runs, 30 RBI, and 14 stolen bases. In 2019, Garrett played in 119 games for the Double–A Jacksonville Jumbo Shrimp, batting .243/.289/.413 with 14 home runs, 63 RBI, and 15 stolen bases. He did not play in a game in 2020 due to the cancellation of the minor league season because of the COVID-19 pandemic. Garrett became a free agent on November 2, 2020.

=== Arizona Diamondbacks ===
After his stint with the Marlins, Garrett briefly decided to leave baseball and begin a full-time career in real estate. In 2021 he connected with a former Marlins scout on LinkedIn, who helped him try out and sign a minor league contract with the Arizona Diamondbacks on March 19, 2021. Garrett spent the majority of the season with the Double-A Amarillo Sod Poodles, also playing in two games for the Triple-A Reno Aces. In 103 games for Amarillo, he hit .280/.317/.516 with 25 home runs, 81 RBI, and 17 stolen bases. He was assigned to Reno to begin the 2022 season. In 103 games for the Aces, Garrett batted .275/.332/.568 with career-highs in home runs (28) and RBI (95), as well as 15 stolen bases.

On August 17, 2022, the Diamondbacks selected Garrett to the 40-man roster and promoted him to the major leagues for the first time. In his debut against the San Francisco Giants, Garrett recorded his first two career hits as part of a two-double, one-RBI game. On August 28, he hit his first career home run, a solo shot off of Chicago White Sox starter Dylan Cease. He appeared in 27 games for Arizona in his rookie campaign, hitting .276/.309/.540 with 4 home runs, 10 RBI, and 3 stolen bases. On November 15, 2022, he was designated for assignment. On November 18, Garrett was non–tendered by the Diamondbacks and became a free agent.

=== Washington Nationals ===
On November 29, 2022, Garrett signed a major league contract with the Washington Nationals. Garrett was optioned to the Triple-A Rochester Red Wings to begin the 2023 season. He was called up to the big league club soon after on April 2, 2023, after Corey Dickerson was placed on the injured list. In an August 23 game against the New York Yankees, Garrett landed awkwardly against the outfield wall while attempting to catch a DJ LeMahieu fly ball. The next day, he was diagnosed with a fractured left fibula. On August 26, Garrett was placed on the 60–day injured list, ending his season. In 89 games for Washington, Garrett batted .269/.343/.457 with 9 home runs and 40 RBI.

On September 27, 2024, Garrett played his first game for the Nationals since his fractured fibula. In his first at-bat, Garrett hit a two-run home run off of Philadelphia Phillies pitcher Ranger Suárez to increase the Nationals' lead to 3–0. Garrett subsequently added a single, double, and walk in three of his following four plate appearances, with three RBI, in a 9–1 Nationals victory.

Garrett was designated for assignment by the Nationals on February 27, 2025. He cleared waivers and was sent outright to Triple-A Rochester on March 4. In 15 games for Rochester, Garrett went 4-for-46 (.087) with two RBI and one stolen base. On April 29, Garrett was released by the Nationals organization.

=== Kiwoom Heroes ===
On June 5, 2025, Garrett signed with the Kiwoom Heroes of the KBO League as a temporary injury replacement for Ruben Cardenas. In 22 appearances for Kiwoom, he batted .241/.280/.310 with two home runs and 15 RBI. Cardenas' return accompanied the expiration of Garrett's contract on July 20, and he was not retained by the Heroes.

Garrett announced his retirement from baseball via Instagram on September 23, 2025.
