= Hunter Wood =

American baseball player (born 1993)

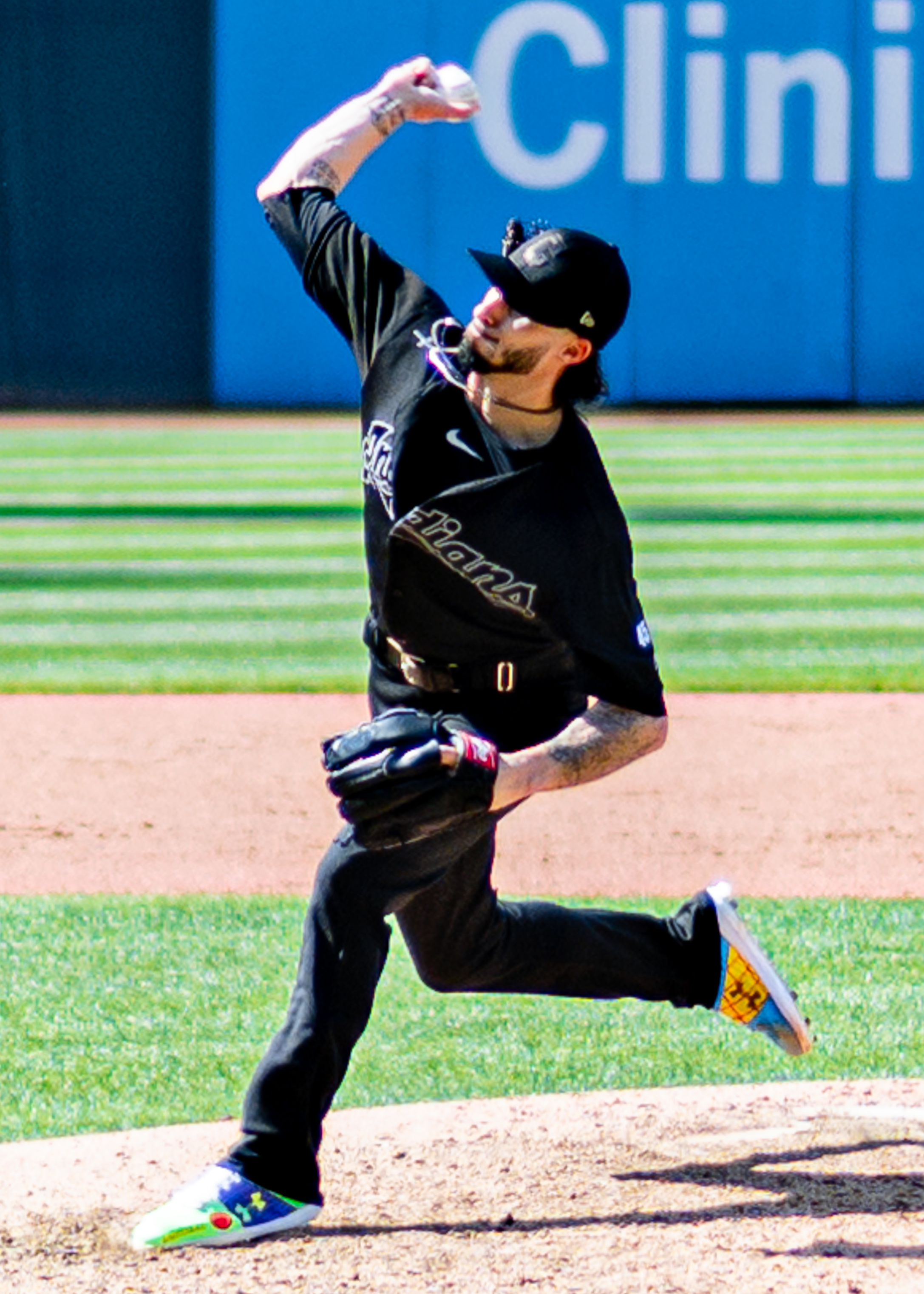
- Wood with the Cleveland Indians in 2019
- Pitcher
- Born: August 12, 1993 (age 32); Rogers, Arkansas, U.S.
- Batted: Right Threw: Right

MLB debut
- May 30, 2017, for the Tampa Bay Rays

Last MLB appearance
- May 22, 2021, for the Texas Rangers

MLB statistics
- Win–loss record: 2–2
- Earned run average: 3.34
- Strikeouts: 86
- Stats at Baseball Reference

Teams
- Tampa Bay Rays (2017–2019); Cleveland Indians (2019); Texas Rangers (2021)

Hunter Blake Wood (born August 12, 1993) is an American former professional baseball pitcher. He has previously played in Major League Baseball (MLB) for the Tampa Bay Rays, Cleveland Indians, and Texas Rangers.

== Career ==
Wood attended Rogers Heritage High School in Rogers, Arkansas. He was drafted by the Boston Red Sox in the 32nd round of the 2012 Major League Baseball draft but did not sign and played college baseball at Howard College.

=== Tampa Bay Rays ===
Wood was drafted by the Tampa Bay Rays in the 29th round of the 2013 MLB draft and signed. He made his professional debut that year with the Princeton Rays and spent the whole season there, going 3–3 with a 3.80 ERA in 16 starts. He pitched 2014 with the Hudson Valley Renegades and Bowling Green Hot Rods, compiling a combined 4–4 record and 3.35 ERA in 19 starts, and 2015 with Bowling Green and Charlotte Stone Crabs where he posted a 2–7 record and 2.20 ERA in 29 games (ten starts). After the 2015 season he pitched in the Arizona Fall League. Wood started 2016 with Charlotte, and was later promoted to the Montgomery Biscuits. In 21 games (18 starts) between the two clubs he pitched to a 9–5 record and 2.39 ERA. Wood started 2017 with the Montgomery Biscuits.

Wood was called up to the Tampa Bay Rays for the first time on May 30, 2017. He made his MLB debut that day, pitching 1/3 of an inning against the Texas Rangers in a 9–5 loss. He was optioned back to Montgomery the next day and promoted to the Durham Bulls in June, where he spent the remainder of the season. In 31 games (18 starts) between Montgomery and Durham he posted a 7–5 record and 4.60 ERA. Wood began 2018 with Durham, but was recalled to Tampa Bay on April 17, where he was often utilized as an opener. For the season, Wood made 29 appearances, 8 starts for the Rays, finishing with a record of 1–1 in 41 innings. Wood came to Spring Training with the Rays in 2019, but was optioned to Minor League camp in late March. Wood started the 2019 season with Durham, but was recalled by the Rays on April 8.

=== Cleveland Indians ===
Wood was traded, along with Christian Arroyo, to the Cleveland Indians on July 28, 2019, in exchange for minor league outfielder Ruben Cardenas and international signing period slot money.

Wood was designated for assignment by the Indians on July 23, 2020. After clearing waivers, he was outrighted to the Indians' alternate training site on July 25. Wood did not play in a game in 2020 due to the cancellation of the minor league season because of the COVID-19 pandemic. He became a free agent on November 2.

=== Texas Rangers ===
On January 19, 2021, Wood signed a minor league contract with the Texas Rangers organization and was invited to Spring Training. On May 15, 2021, Wood was selected to the active roster. In 5 appearances for Texas, Wood recorded a 3.60 ERA. On June 4, Wood was placed on the 60-day injured list with a mild UCL sprain. Wood later underwent surgery with a recovery timetable of at least 8 months. However, he did not undergo Tommy John surgery, instead undergoing a procedure which installed an internal brace in his elbow. On October 9, Wood elected free agency.

=== Minnesota Twins ===
On May 27, 2022, Wood signed a minor league contract with the Minnesota Twins. He spent the year with the Triple–A St. Paul Saints, also playing in one game for the rookie–level Florida Complex League Twins. In eight games for St. Paul, Wood recorded a 2.08 ERA with 10 strikeouts across 8 2/3 innings pitched. He elected free agency following the season on November 10.
