= Kingsley Keke =

American football player (born 1996)

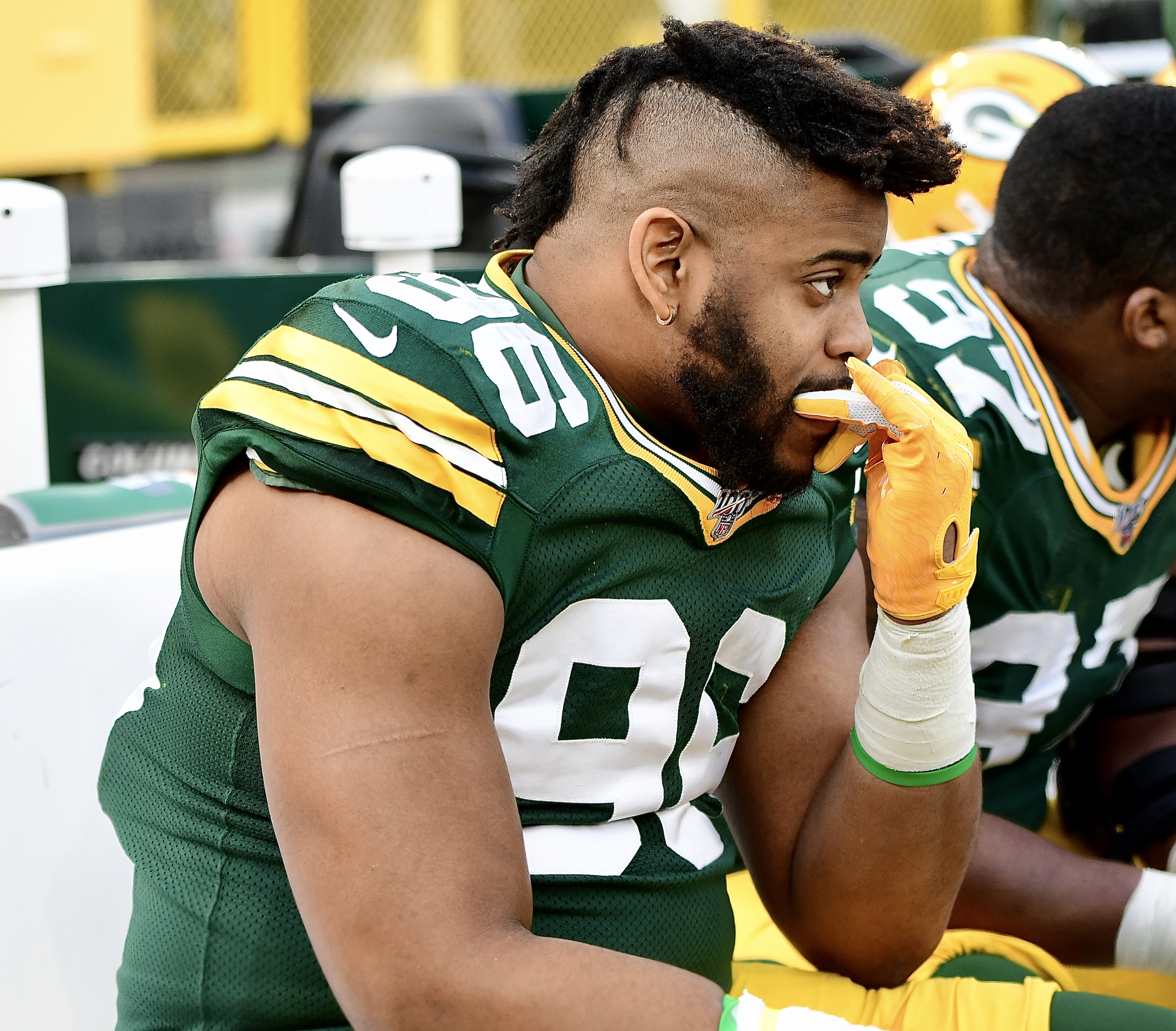
- Keke with the Green Bay Packers in 2019

No. 96
- Position: Defensive tackle

Personal information
- Born: September 26, 1996 (age 30); Houston, Texas, U.S.
- Listed height: 6 ft 3 in (1.91 m)
- Listed weight: 288 lb (131 kg)

Career information
- High school: George Ranch (Richmond, Texas)
- College: Texas A&M (2015–2018)
- NFL draft: 2019: 5th round, 150th overall pick

Career history
- Green Bay Packers (2019–2021); Houston Texans (2022)*; Arizona Cardinals (2022)*
- * Offseason or practice squad member only

Career NFL statistics
- Total tackles: 54
- Sacks: 6.5
- Forced fumbles: 2
- Pass deflections: 5
- Stats at Pro Football Reference

Kingsley-Collins Ezenna Keke (born September 26, 1996) is an American former professional football player who was a defensive tackle in the National Football League (NFL). He played college football for the Texas A&M Aggies, and was selected by the Green Bay Packers in the fifth round of the 2019 NFL draft.

== Early life ==
Kingsley-Collins Ezenna Keke played football and basketball at George Ranch High School in Richmond, Texas. As a senior, Keke made sixty tackles, ten tackles for loss, five sacks, blocked a pair of kicks, and was a finalist for the Greater Houston Rotary Lombardi Award.

== College career ==
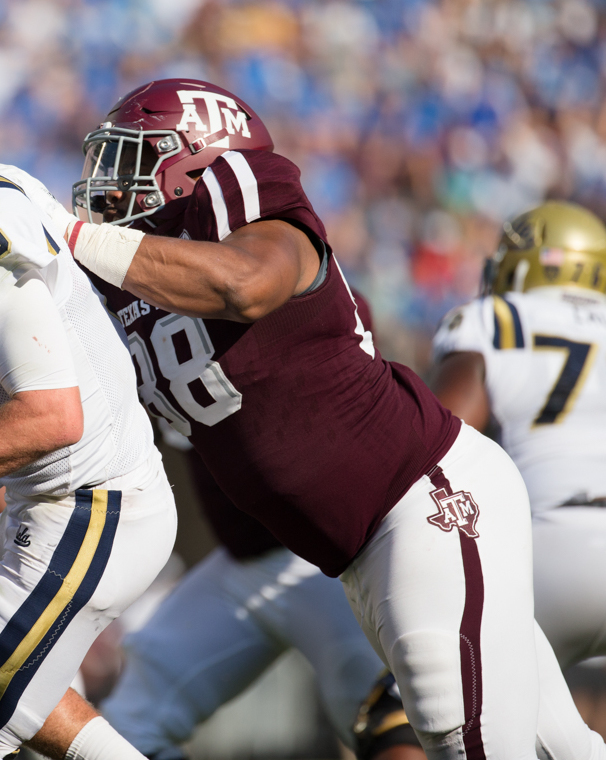
Keke in 2016

Keke played at Texas A&M from 2015 to 2018. In his career at Texas A&M, he recorded one hundred fifty total tackles, 21 tackles for loss, and 12 sacks.

== Professional career ==
Pre-draft measurables
Height	Weight	Arm length	Hand span	40-yard dash	10-yard split	20-yard split	20-yard shuttle	Three-cone drill	Vertical jump	Broad jump	Bench press
6 ft 2 5/8 in (1.90 m)	288 lb (131 kg)	34 1/2 in (0.88 m)	9 3/4 in (0.25 m)	4.95 s	1.76 s	2.89 s	4.46 s	7.55 s	31.5 in (0.80 m)	9 ft 3 in (2.82 m)	20 reps
All values from NFL Combine/Pro Day

=== Green Bay Packers ===
Keke was selected by the Green Bay Packers in the fifth round, 150th overall, in the 2019 NFL draft. On May 3, 2019, he signed his rookie contract with the Packers.

In Week 3 of the 2020 season against the New Orleans Saints, Keke recorded his first two career sacks on Drew Brees during the 37–30 win. In Week 13 against the Philadelphia Eagles, he sacked Carson Wentz twice and had four total tackles (two for loss) during the 30–16 win.

On January 19, 2022, Keke was released by the Packers. He was claimed the following day by the Houston Texans

=== Houston Texans ===
On January 20, 2022, Keke was claimed off waivers by the Texans. He was waived on May 3, 2022.

=== Arizona Cardinals ===
On May 13, 2022, Keke signed with the Arizona Cardinals. He was released on August 14, 2022.

== NFL career statistics ==
=== Regular season ===
Year	Team	Games		Tackles				Interceptions				Fumbles			
Year	Team	GP	GS	Total	Solo	Ast	Sck	PD	Int	Yds	TD	FF	FR	Yds	TD
2019	GB	14	0	10	3	7	0.0	0	0	0	0	0	0	0	0
2020	GB	15	9	21	12	9	4.0	2	0	0	0	1	0	0	0
2021	GB	12	8	23	10	13	2.5	3	0	0	0	1	0	0	0
Total		41	17	54	25	29	6.5	5	0	0	0	2	0	0	0
Source: pro-football-reference.com

=== Postseason ===
Year	Team	Games		Tackles				Interceptions				Fumbles			
Year	Team	GP	GS	Total	Solo	Ast	Sck	PD	Int	Yds	TD	FF	FR	Yds	TD
2019	GB	2	0	3	2	1	0.0	0	0	0	0	0	0	0	0
Total		2	0	3	2	1	0.0	0	0	0	0	0	0	0	0
Source: pro-football-reference.com

== Personal life ==
Keke spent a year in Nigeria during his childhood.
