= George Ranch High School =

Public school in Texas, United States

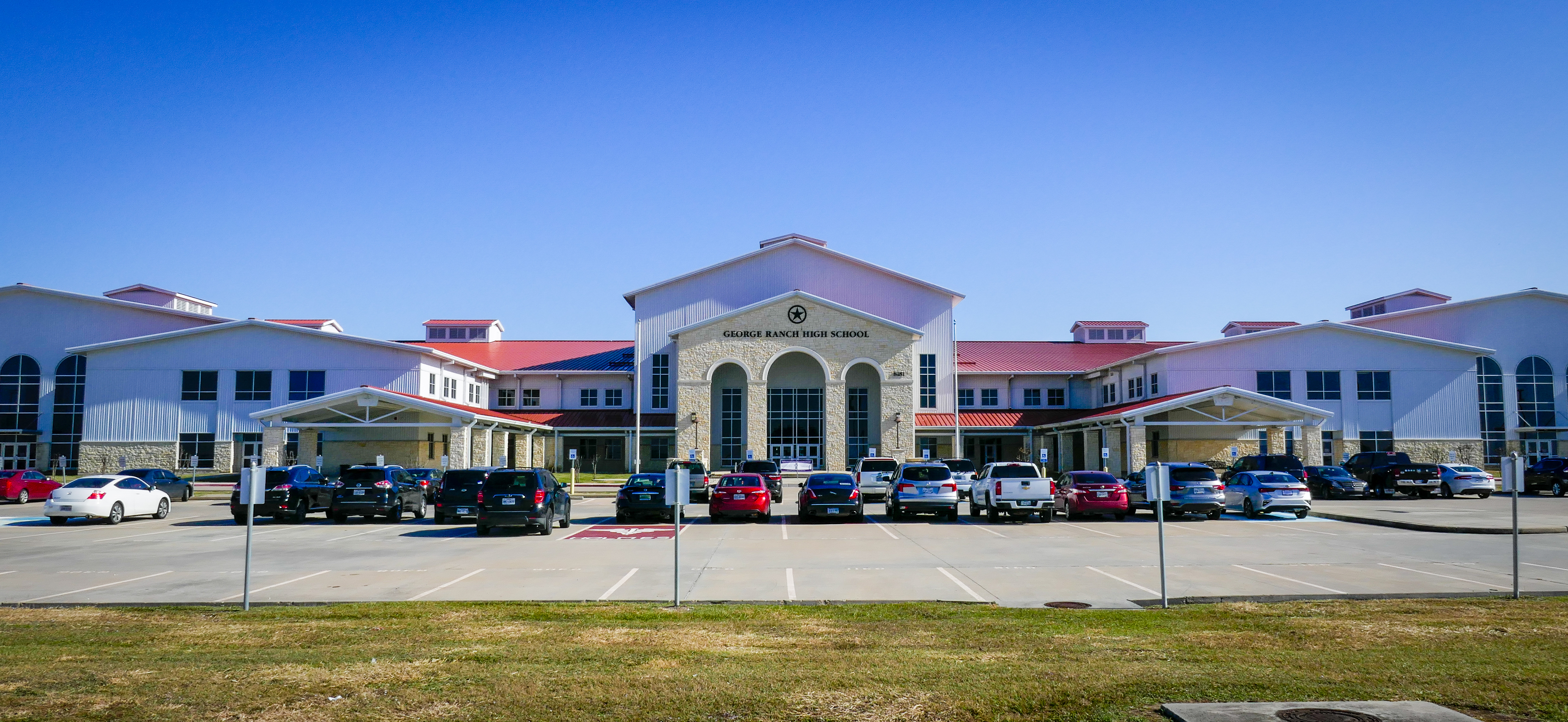

Location
- 8181 FM 762; Richmond, Texas 77469; United States; 29.5165°N 95.6912°W

Information
- Other names: George Ranch; GRHS
- Type: comprehensive; public
- Motto: "Reflecting on a proud past, building a dynamic future"
- Established: 2010
- School district: Lamar Consolidated Independent School District
- NCES District ID: 4826580
- Educational authority: Texas Education Agency
- Superintendent: Roosevelt Nivens
- CEEB code: 445862
- NCES School ID: 482658011891
- Principal: Heather Patterson
- Staff: 113.03 (FTE)
- Teaching staff: 113.03 (on FTE basis)
- Grades: 9 to 12
- Gender: Co-ed
  - Grade 9: 604
  - Grade 10: 573
  - Grade 11: 630
  - Grade 12: 577
- Student to teacher ratio: 21.09∶1
- Campus type: suburb
- Colors: Maroon, black, gray and white
- Athletics: Football, Baseball, Soccer, Wrestling, Tennis, Swim and Dive, Softball, Track and Field, Cross-country, Basketball, and Golf
- Mascot: Longhorns
- USNWR ranking: 1,743
- Website: grhs.lcisd.org

George Ranch High School is a secondary school located in unincorporated Fort Bend County, Texas, United States, south of Richmond.

The school is part of the Lamar Consolidated Independent School District. The school was established in fall 2010 with the intent of relieving the student populations at the other high schools in LCISD. George Ranch High School has approximately 2700 students.

It serves portions of Rosenberg, unincorporated portions of Fort Bend County, the LCISD portion of Sugar Land (including Greatwood), Thompsons, and the communities of Crabb, and Canyon Gate.

The school's address is 8181 FM 762, Richmond, TX 77469, adjacent to Reading Junior High School. They won the 5A/D1 State Football Championship on December 18, 2015, defeating a heavily depleted squad due to injuries, Lake Ridge High School, 56–0. Clubs like TSA (Technology Student Association) also are very popular in this school as repeated TSA national appearances are very common.

== Feeder schools ==
Lamar CISD calls this feeder system the "Maroon Track." Feeder junior high and middle schools share the GRHS colors and mascot.

=== Junior high School ===
- Reading Junior High School

=== Middle school ===
- Polly Ryon Middle School

=== Elementary schools ===
- Don Carter Elementary School
- Bess Campbell Elementary School
- Susanna Dickinson Elementary School
- Manford Williams Elementary School
- Cora Thomas Elementary School
- William Velasquez Elementary School

Campbell, Dickinson, Williams, and Velasquez elementary schools entirely feed into George Ranch High School.

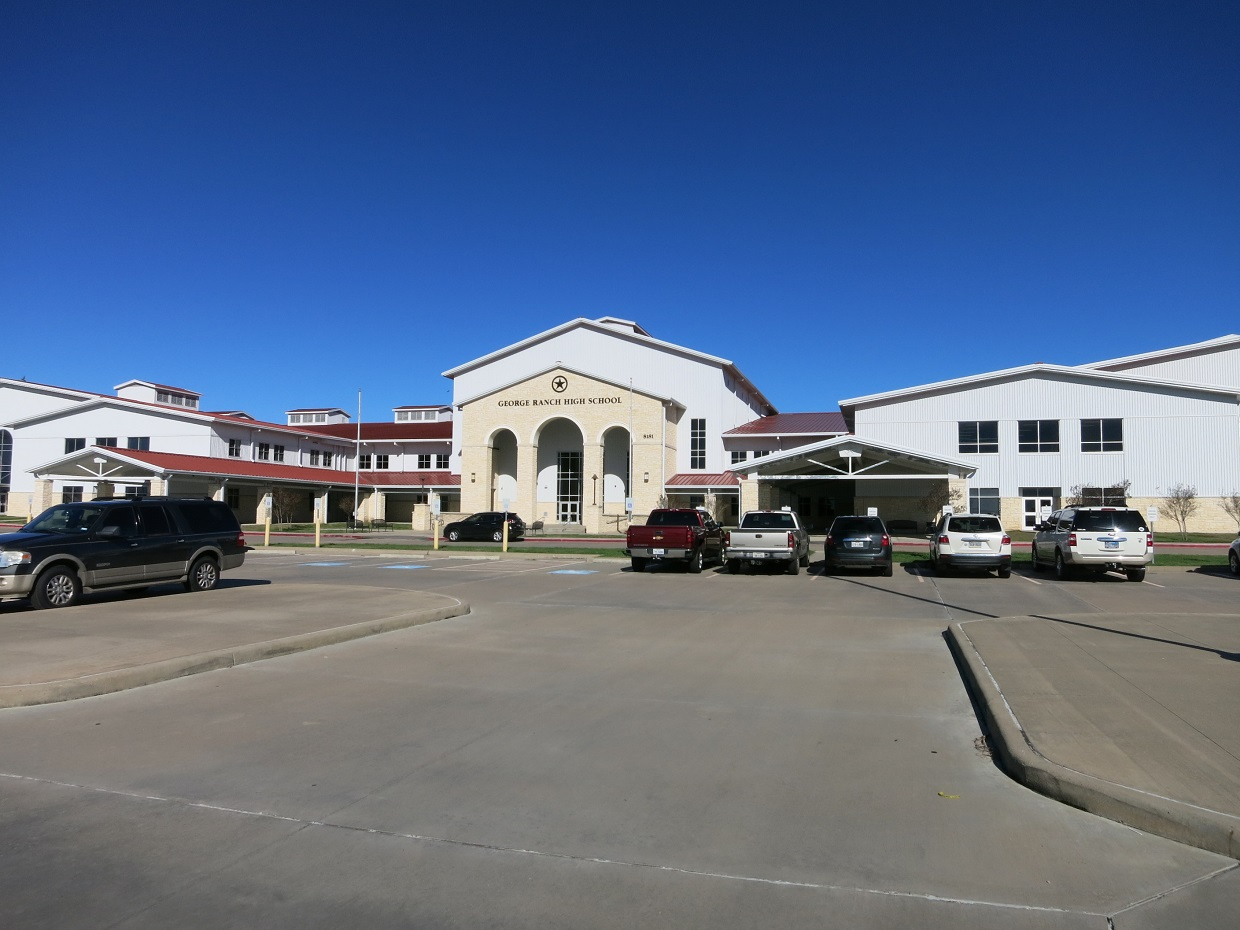
George Ranch High School

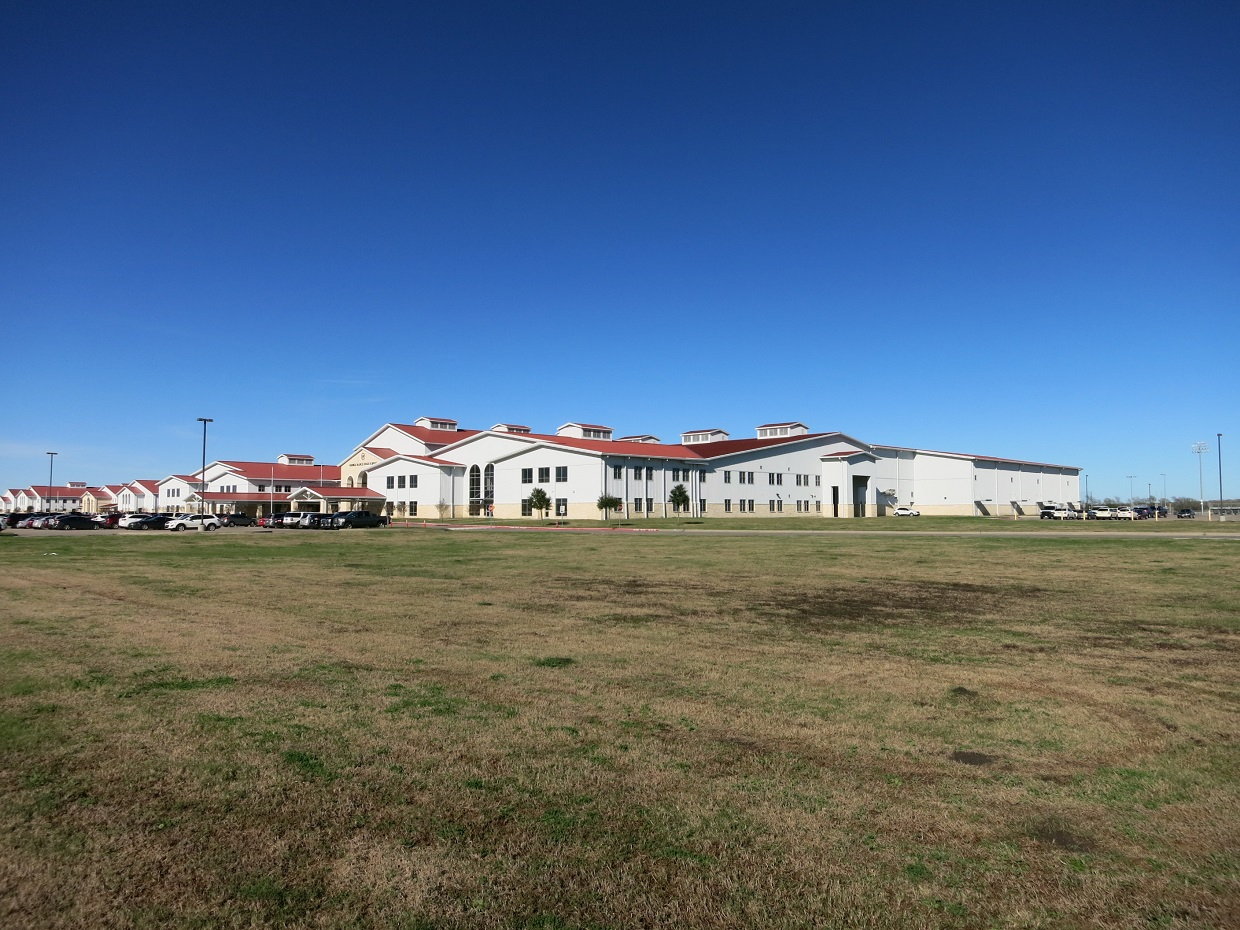
George Ranch High School is the southernmost of a 3-school complex.

== Notable alumni ==
- Champion Allison (class of 2017), track and field athlete
- Darius Anderson, NFL running back for the Indianapolis Colts
- Kingsley Keke, NFL defensive end for the Green Bay Packers
- Kevin Kopps, baseball player
- Maddie Marlow, of Maddie and Tae, award-winning country music duo
- Quintin Morris, NFL tight end for the Buffalo Bills
- Stone Garrett, Outfielder for the Washington Nationals
- Noah Thomasson, college basketball player for the Georgia Bulldogs
