= Ruben Cardenas =

American baseball player (born 1997)

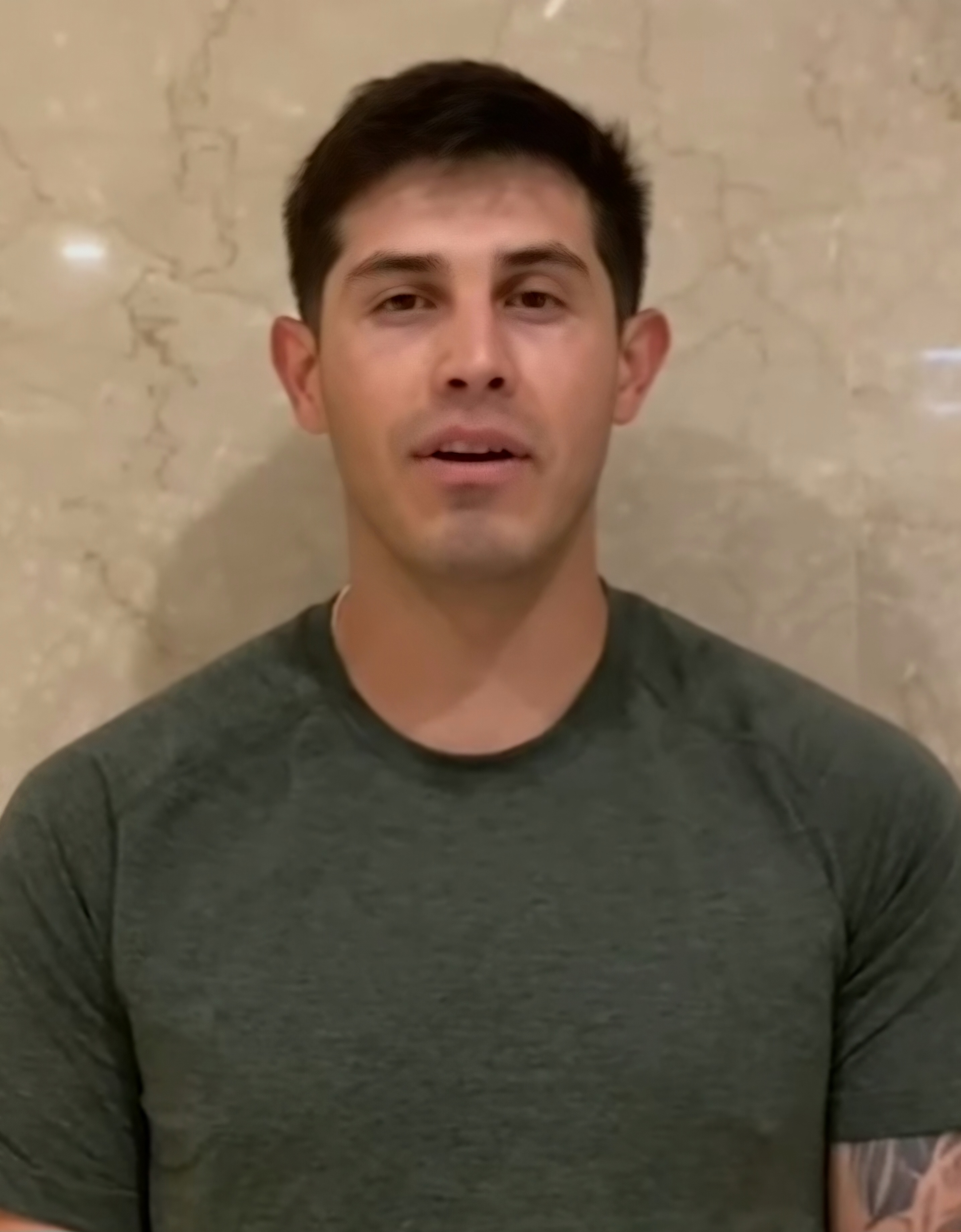

Free agent
- Outfielder
- Born: October 10, 1997 (age 29); Los Angeles, California, U.S.
- Bats: Right Throws: Right

KBO debut
- July 19, 2024, for the Samsung Lions

KBO statistics (through 2025 season)
- Batting average: .259
- Home runs: 9
- Runs batted in: 47
- Stats at Baseball Reference

Teams
- Samsung Lions (2024); Kiwoom Heroes (2025)

Ruben Cardenas (born October 10, 1997) is an American professional baseball outfielder who is a free agent. He has previously played in the KBO League for the Samsung Lions and Kiwoom Heroes.

== Amateur career ==
Cardenas attended Saugus High School in Santa Clarita, California before transferring to Bishop Alemany High School in Mission Hills, California as a junior. He batted .400 as a sophomore and .412 as a junior. He was selected by the Miami Marlins in the 37th round of the 2015 Major League Baseball draft, but did not sign. He originally signed a letter of intent to play college baseball at the University of Nevada, Reno, but instead attended California State University, Fullerton.

As a freshman at Cal State Fullerton in 2016, Cardenas appeared in 44 games, batting .233 with three home runs and 28 RBI, and played in only 16 games in 2017 due to a back injury. In 2018, his junior year, he hit .292/.355/.432 with four home runs, 38 RBI, and 12 stolen bases over sixty games. Following the season's end, he was drafted by the Cleveland Indians in the 16th round, with the 493rd overall selection, of the 2018 Major League Baseball draft.

== Professional career ==
=== Cleveland Indians ===
Cardenas signed with the Indians and made his professional debut with the Rookie-level Arizona League Indians before being assigned to the Mahoning Valley Scrappers of the Low–A New York–Penn League, batting .308 over 42 games with both clubs. He began the 2019 season with the Lake County Captains of the Single–A Midwest League.

=== Tampa Bay Rays ===
On July 28, 2019, Cardenas and international signing period slot money were traded to the Tampa Bay Rays in exchange for Christian Arroyo and Hunter Wood. He was the assigned to the Bowling Green Hot Rods of the Single–A Midwest League. Over 114 games between Lake County and Bowling Green, he slashed .271/.338/.450 with 13 home runs and 70 RBI. He returned to Bowling Green, now members of the High-A East, to begin the 2021 season before he was promoted to the Montgomery Biscuits of the Double-A South in mid-June. He was named the Double-A South Player of the Month for July after batting .340 with eight home runs and 22 RBI with 11 multi-hit games. Over 105 games for the 2021 season between Bowling Green and Montgomery, Cardenas slashed .292/.333/.523 with 25 home runs and 78 RBI. He was assigned to the Durham Bulls of the Triple-A International League for the 2022 season. Over 82 games with Durham, he batted .208 with 16 home runs and 41 RBI. For the 2023 season, he returned to Durham. Over 132 games, Cardenas hit .269 with 22 home runs and 82 RBI.

Cardenas began the 2024 season back with Durham, hitting .281/.346/.530 with 11 home runs and 28 RBI across 49 appearances.

=== Philadelphia Phillies ===
On June 6, 2024, Cardenas was traded to the Philadelphia Phillies in exchange for cash considerations. In 26 games for the Triple–A Lehigh Valley IronPigs, Cardenas batted .269/.342/.587 with nine home runs, 28 RBI, and five stolen bases.

=== Samsung Lions ===
On July 10, 2024, Cardenas signed a one-year, $477,000 contract with the Samsung Lions of the KBO League. In seven games for Samsung, he hit .333/.360/.667 with two home runs and five RBI. Cardenas was released by Samsung following the signing of Lewin Díaz on August 12.

=== Kiwoom Heroes ===
On November 25, 2024, Cardenas signed a $600,000 contract with the Kiwoom Heroes of the KBO League. On June 5, 2025, Cardenas was ruled out for six weeks due to a flexor injury in his right arm, and was temporary replaced by Stone Garrett. Cardenas returned to play in 86 games and hit .253 with seven home run and 42 RBI before missing the end of the season due to a broken finger. He became a free agent following the season.
