= Long reliever =

Pitching role in baseball

A long reliever or long-relief pitcher is a relief pitcher in baseball who enters the game if the starting pitcher leaves the game early.

Long relievers often enter within the first three innings of a game when the starting pitcher cannot continue due to either ineffective pitching, lack of endurance, rain delay, injury, strategy, or ejection. The strategy is that the long reliever will pitch enough innings to preclude using many different relievers from the bullpen. The hope is that the long reliever get the game under control, and his team's offense will rally.

Long relievers are usually players who used to be starters either in the major leagues or in the minors (and can start a game if one of the normal starters is injured or otherwise unavailable, or necessary due to workload as a "spot starter"), but whose teams believe they have better starters available. Sometimes a team's long reliever is a former starter who has lost his effectiveness, either through a decline in skills or a series of injuries. Occasionally, long relievers are inexperienced pitchers who may have the potential to become starters or setup pitchers after gaining major league experience.

The quality of long relievers can vary, but when the long reliever is considered to be an ineffective former starter, he is often called the "mop up man" or "mop-up pitcher" and is often called by managers to pitch in games where there is an abundant run margin between either team which is colloquially termed pitching "mop duty".

A secondary use of a long reliever is in the late extra innings of a tied game, once the team's other, generally more effective, relievers have already been used. While a long reliever is often a team's least effective pitcher, he is still often a far better choice in an extended game than resorting to one of the team's starting pitchers (which can spread chaos throughout a pitching rotation, as everyone's future schedule gets adjusted), or even worse, resorting to a position player on the mound. A long man generally enters the game somewhere between the 11th and 16th innings in this role, and can be expected to pitch 5 or more innings, before a team will be forced to resort to other options.

Occasionally during the season, a team may find itself with enough rest days to allow it to use a four-man rotation rather than the now standard five. In these situations, a team may choose to keep their "fifth" starter on the roster in the long reliever role. This happens particularly in the post-season, when the fifth starter is a better pitcher than the "regular" long-reliever, allowing the team to carry either an additional short reliever, or position player, in lieu of the regular long man.

In recent years, teams began experimenting with an opener, a relief pitcher who starts a game but pitches for at least the first inning. In this strategy, the opener usually pitches against the opponent's best batters at the start of a game in hopes of throwing them off guard, before giving way to a long reliever who would normally be a starter in this situation.

== See also ==
- Glossary of baseball terms § mop up
