= 2020 New York Mets season =

2020 New York Mets
- League: National League
- Division: East
- Ballpark: Citi Field
- City: New York City, New York
- Record: 26–34 (.433)
- Divisional place: 5th
- Owners: Fred Wilpon
- General manager: Brodie Van Wagenen
- Managers: Carlos Beltran (until January 16th), Luis Rojas (from January 24th onward)
- Television: SportsNet New York (Gary Cohen, Ron Darling, Keith Hernandez)
- Radio: WCBS 880 AM (English); New York Mets Radio Network (Howie Rose, Wayne Randazzo); Que Buena 92.7 (Spanish) (Juan Alicea, Max Perez Jiminez)

The 2020 New York Mets season was the franchise's 59th season and the team's 12th season at Citi Field. The team hired Carlos Beltrán to be their manager in November 2019, however in the wake of the Houston Astros sign stealing scandal, on January 16, 2020, Beltrán and the Mets agreed to part ways. On January 24, Luis Rojas was hired as the Mets manager. The season is also the last season to have Fred Wilpon as the team's majority owner before being sold to billionaire hedge fund manager Steve Cohen.

On March 12, MLB announced that because of the COVID-19 pandemic, the start of the regular season would be delayed by at least two weeks in addition to the remainder of spring training being cancelled. Four days later, it was announced that the start of the season would be pushed back indefinitely due to the recommendation made by the CDC restricting large public events. On June 23, commissioner Rob Manfred unilaterally implemented a 60-game season. Players reported to training camps on July 1 in order to resume spring training and prepare for a July 24 Opening Day.

On September 23, the team suffered its 31st loss, sealing their third losing season in four years. On September 26, the Mets were eliminated from playoff contention in a 4–3 loss to the Washington Nationals, continuing a four-year-long playoff drought. The Mets finished the regular season 26–34, giving them a last place finish as a result of a 4–6 record against the Nationals, who also went 26–34. This was the first season since 2003 where the Mets finished last place in the National League East.

The Mets led MLB in batting average (.272) and OPS+ (122), however they also grounded into the most double plays (53, tied with the Milwaukee Brewers) and had the most runners left on base (445).

== Offseason ==
=== Transactions ===
==== 2019 ====
- December 12 – Rick Porcello signs with the Mets on a one-year, $10 million contract.
- December 13 – Michael Wacha signs with the Mets after reaching a one-year, $3 million contract which includes $8 million in performance bonuses.
- December 24 – Dellin Betances signs with the Mets for a one-year, $10.5 million contract.

== Season standings ==
=== National League East ===
NL East
Team	W	L	Pct.	GB	Home	Road
Atlanta Braves	35	25	.583	—	19‍–‍11	16‍–‍14
Miami Marlins	31	29	.517	4	11‍–‍15	20‍–‍14
Philadelphia Phillies	28	32	.467	7	19‍–‍13	9‍–‍19
Washington Nationals	26	34	.433	9	15‍–‍18	11‍–‍16
New York Mets	26	34	.433	9	12‍–‍17	14‍–‍17

=== National League division leaders ===
Division leaders
Team	W	L	Pct.
Los Angeles Dodgers	43	17	.717
Atlanta Braves	35	25	.583
Chicago Cubs	34	26	.567

Division 2nd place
Team	W	L	Pct.
San Diego Padres	37	23	.617
St. Louis Cardinals	30	28	.517
Miami Marlins	31	29	.517

Wild Card teams (Top 2 teams qualify for postseason)
Team	W	L	Pct.	GB
Cincinnati Reds	31	29	.517	+2
Milwaukee Brewers	29	31	.483	—
San Francisco Giants	29	31	.483	—
Philadelphia Phillies	28	32	.467	1
Washington Nationals	26	34	.433	3
New York Mets	26	34	.433	3
Colorado Rockies	26	34	.433	3
Arizona Diamondbacks	25	35	.417	4
Pittsburgh Pirates	19	41	.317	10

=== Record vs. opponents ===
2020 National League record Source: MLB Standings Grid – 2020
Team}}!style="background-color: #13274F !important; color: #FFFFFF !important; box-shadow: inset 2px 2px 0 #CE1141, inset -2px -2px 0 #CE1141; !important; width:35px;"STLSF	AL					
Atlanta	—	6–4	7–3	5–5	6–4	11–9
Miami	4–6	—	4–6	7–3	6–4	10–10
New York	3–7	6–4	—	4–6	4–6	9–11
Philadelphia	5–5	3–7	6–4	—	7–3	7–13
Washington	4–6	4–6	6–4	3–7	—	9–11

== Game log ==
=== Regular season ===
On April 28–30, the Mets were supposed to play against the Miami Marlins in the Puerto Rico Series in San Juan. But due to the pandemic, MLB cancelled the series.

2020 Game Log
Overall: 26–34 (Home: 13–17; Away: 13–17)
July: 3–5 (Home: 1–4; Away: 2–1)

#	Date	Opponent	Score	Win	Loss	Save	Stadium	Record
1	July 24	Braves	1–0	**Lugo** (1–0)	Martin (0–1)	**Díaz** (1)	**Citi Field**	1–0
2	July 25	Braves	3–5 (10)	Jackson (1–0)	**Strickland** (0–1)	—	**Citi Field**	1–1
3	July 26	Braves	1–14	Chacín (1–0)	**Porcello** (0–1)	—	**Citi Field**	1–2
4	July 27	@ Red Sox	7–4	**Wacha** (1–0)	Osich (0–1)	**Lugo** (1)	Fenway Park	2–2
5	July 28	@ Red Sox	8–3	**Peterson** (1–0)	Hall (0–1)	—	Fenway Park	3–2
6	July 29	Red Sox	5–6	Hembree (1–0)	**Wilson** (0–1)	Workman (1)	**Citi Field**	3–3
7	July 30	Red Sox	2–4	Pérez (1–1)	**Matz** (0–1)	Workman (2)	**Citi Field**	3–4
8	July 31	@ Braves	10–11	Dayton (1–0)	**Lugo** (1–1)	Martin (1)	Truist Park	3–5

August: 12–15 (Home: 6–6; Away: 6–9)

#	Date	Opponent	Score	Win	Loss	Save	Stadium	Record
9	August 1	@ Braves	1–7	Tomlin (1–0)	**Wacha** (1–1)	—	Truist Park	3–6
10	August 2	@ Braves	0–4	Matzek (1–0)	**Peterson** (1–1)	—	Truist Park	3–7
11	August 3	@ Braves	7–2	**deGrom** (1–0)	Soroka (0–1)	—	Truist Park	4–7
12	August 4	@ Nationals	3–5	Corbin (1–0)	**Matz** (0–2)	Hudson (2)	Nationals Park	4–8
13	August 5	@ Nationals	3–1	**Porcello** (1–1)	Fedde (0–1)	**Lugo** (2)	Nationals Park	5–8
14	August 7	Marlins	3–4	Tarpley (2–0)	**Wacha** (1–2)	Vincent (1)	**Citi Field**	5–9
15	August 8	Marlins	8–4	**Peterson** (2–1)	Castano (0–1)	—	**Citi Field**	6–9
16	August 9	Marlins	4–2	**deGrom** (2–0)	López (1–1)	**Lugo** (3)	**Citi Field**	7–9
17	August 10	Nationals	4–16	Corbin (2–0)	**Matz** (0–3)	—	**Citi Field**	7–10
18	August 11	Nationals	1–2	Scherzer (1–1)	**Porcello** (1–2)	Hudson (3)	**Citi Field**	7–11
19	August 12	Nationals	11–6	**Familia** (1–0)	Sánchez (0–3)	—	**Citi Field**	8–11
20	August 13	Nationals	8–2	**Peterson** (3–1)	Voth (0–2)	—	**Citi Field**	9–11
21	August 14	@ Phillies	5–6	Neris (1–0)	**Lugo** (1–2)	—	Citizens Bank Park	9–12
22	August 15	@ Phillies	2–6	Nola (2–1)	**Matz** (0–4)	—	Citizens Bank Park	9–13
23	August 16	@ Phillies	2–6	Wheeler (3–0)	**Porcello** (1–3)	—	Citizens Bank Park	9–14
24	August 17	@ Marlins	11–4	**Shreve** (1–0)	Yamamoto (0–1)	**Kilome** (1)	Marlins Park	10–14
25	August 18	@ Marlins	8–3	**Wilson** (1–1)	Mejía (0–1)	—	Marlins Park	11–14
26	August 19	@ Marlins	5–3	**Díaz** (1–0)	Kintzler (1–2)	—	Marlins Park	12–14
—	August 20	@ Marlins	Postponed (COVID-19); Makeup: Aug 25					
—	August 21	Yankees	Postponed (COVID-19); Makeup: Aug 28					
—	August 22	Yankees	Postponed (COVID-19); Makeup: Aug 30					
—	August 23	Yankees	Postponed (COVID-19); Makeup: Sep 3					
27	August 25	Marlins	0–4 (7)	Bleier (1–0)	**Porcello** (1–4)	—	**Citi Field**	12–15
28	August 25	@ Marlins	0–3 (7)	Smith (1–0)	**Hughes** (0–1)	Vincent (2)	**Citi Field**	12–16
29	August 26	Marlins	5–4	**Brach** (1–0)	Vincent (1–2)	—	**Citi Field**	13–16
—	August 27	Marlins	Postponed (strikes due to shooting of Jacob Blake); Makeup: August 31					
30	August 28	@ Yankees	6–4	**Lockett** (1–0)	Green (2–2)	**Díaz** (2)	Yankee Stadium	14–16
31	August 28	Yankees	4–3	**Hughes** (1–1)	Chapman (0–1)	—	Yankee Stadium	15–16
32	August 29	@ Yankees	1–2	Chapman (1–1)	**Betances** (0–1)	—	Yankee Stadium	15–17
33	August 30	@ Yankees	7–8 (8)	Green (3–2)	**Díaz** (1–1)	—	Yankee Stadium	15–18
34	August 30	Yankees	2–5 (8)	Holder (1–0)	**Smith** (0–1)	Cessa (1)	Yankee Stadium	15–19
35	August 31	Marlins	3–5	Rogers (1–0)	**deGrom** (2–1)	Kintzler (7)	**Citi Field**	15–20

September: 11–14 (Home: 6–7; Away: 5–7)

#	Date	Opponent	Score	Win	Loss	Save	Stadium	Record
36	September 1	@ Orioles	5–9	Eshelman (3–0)	**Kilome** (0–1)	—	Camden Yards	15–21
37	September 2	@ Orioles	9–4	**Peterson** (4–1)	Means (0–3)	—	Camden Yards	16–21
38	September 3	Yankees	9–7 (10)	**Díaz** (2–1)	Abreu (0–1)	—	**Citi Field**	17–21
39	September 4	Phillies	3–5	Arrieta (3–4)	**Hughes** (1–2)	Workman (9)	**Citi Field**	17–22
40	September 5	Phillies	5–1	**Lugo** (2–2)	Howard (1–2)	—	**Citi Field**	18–22
41	September 6	Phillies	14–1	**deGrom** (3–1)	Nola (4–3)	—	**Citi Field**	19–22
42	September 7	Phillies	8–9 (10)	Workman (1–1)	**Castro** (1–1)	Neris (3)	**Citi Field**	19–23
43	September 8	Orioles	2–11	Means (1–3)	**Wacha** (1–3)	—	**Citi Field**	19–24
44	September 9	Orioles	7–6	**Familia** (2–0)	Harvey (0–1)	**Díaz** (3)	**Citi Field**	20–24
45	September 11	@ Blue Jays	18–1	**deGrom** (4–1)	Anderson (0–1)	**Ramírez** (1)	Sahlen Field	21–24
46	September 12	@ Blue Jays	2–3	Ray (2–4)	**Lugo** (2–3)	Dolis (4)	Sahlen Field	21–25
47	September 13	@ Blue Jays	3–7	Ryu (4–1)	**Peterson** (4–2)	—	Sahlen Field	21–26
48	September 15	@ Phillies	1–4	Arrieta (4–4)	**Porcello** (1–5)	Neris (4)	Citizens Bank Park	21–27
49	September 16	@ Phillies	5–4	**Castro** (2–1)	Neris (2–2)	**Díaz** (4)	Citizens Bank Park	22–27
50	September 17	@ Phillies	10–6	**Wilson** (2–1)	Workman (1–3)	—	Citizens Bank Park	23–27
51	September 18	Braves	2–15	Fried (7–0)	**Matz** (0–5)	—	**Citi Field**	23–28
52	September 19	Braves	7–2	**Peterson** (5–2)	Anderson (3–1)	—	**Citi Field**	24–28
53	September 20	Braves	0–7	Wright (2–4)	**Porcello** (1–6)	—	**Citi Field**	24–29
54	September 21	Rays	1–2	Fleming (4–0)	**deGrom** (4–2)	Anderson (6)	**Citi Field**	24–30
55	September 22	Rays	5–2	**Lugo** (3–3)	Snell (4–2)	**Díaz** (5)	**Citi Field**	25–30
56	September 23	Rays	5–8	Glasnow (5–1)	**Wacha** (1–4)	—	**Citi Field**	25–31
57	September 24	@ Nationals	3–2	**Peterson** (6–2)	Corbin (2–7)	**Díaz** (6)	Nationals Park	26–31
–	September 25	@ Nationals	Postponed (rain); Makeup: September 26 as part of a doubleheader					
58	September 26	@ Nationals	3–4 (7)	Scherzer (5–4)	**Castro** (2–2)	Harris (1)	Nationals Park	26–32
59	September 26	@ Nationals	3–5 (7)	Sánchez (4–5)	**Porcello** (1–7)	Hudson (10)	Nationals Park	26–33
60	September 27	@ Nationals	5–15	Voth (2–5)	**Lugo** (3–4)	—	Nationals Park	26–34

Legend: = Win = Loss = Postponement
Bold = Mets team member

== Roster ==
2020 New York Mets
Roster
Pitchers: 68 Dellin Betances; 29 Brad Brach; 50 Miguel Castro; 48 Jacob deGrom; 39 Edwin Díaz; 27 Jeurys Familia; 65 Robert Gsellman; 35 Jared Hughes; 49 Ariel Jurado; 66 Franklyn Kilome; 61 Walker Lockett; 67 Seth Lugo; 32 Steven Matz; 55 Corey Oswalt; 77 David Peterson; 22 Rick Porcello; 43 Erasmo Ramírez; 51 Paul Sewald; 47 Chasen Shreve; 62 Drew Smith; 71 Hunter Strickland; 45 Michael Wacha; 38 Justin Wilson	Catchers: 26 Robinson Chirinos; 3 Tomas Nido; 40 Wilson Ramos; 44 René Rivera; 70 Ali Sánchez; Infielders: 20 Pete Alonso; 24 Robinson Canó; 28 J. D. Davis; 15 Brian Dozier; 33,21 Todd Frazier; 60 Andrés Giménez; 13 Luis Guillorme; 1 Amed Rosario; 2 Dominic Smith	Outfielders: 30 Michael Conforto; 18 Ryan Cordell; 21 Billy Hamilton; 15 Guillermo Heredia; 87,15 Juan Lagares; 16 Jake Marisnick; 6 Jeff McNeil; 9 Brandon Nimmo; 12 Eduardo Núñez; Other batters: 52 Yoenis Céspedes	Manager: 19 Luis Rojas; Coaches: 50,59 Jeremy Accardo (assistant pitching); 25 Ricky Bones (bullpen); 54 Chili Davis (hitting); 11 Tony DeFrancesco (first base); 10 Gary DiSarcina (third base/infield); 91 Ryan Ellis (hitting performance coordinator); 53 Jeremy Hefner (pitching); 90 Ender Chávez (batting practice pitcher); 78 Eric Langill (bullpen catcher); 58 Hensley Meulens (bench); 57 Dave Racaniello (bullpen catcher); 23 Brian Schneider (quality control); 56 Tom Slater (assistant hitting)

== Player stats ==
=== Batting ===
Note: G = Games played; AB = At bats; R = Runs; H = Hits; 2B = Doubles; 3B = Triples; HR = Home runs; RBI = Runs batted in; SB = Stolen bases; BB = Walks; AVG = Batting average; SLG = Slugging average

Player	G	AB	R	H	2B	3B	HR	RBI	SB	BB	AVG	SLG
Pete Alonso	57	208	31	48	6	0	16	35	1	24	.231	.490
Michael Conforto	54	202	40	65	12	0	9	31	3	24	.322	.515
J. D. Davis	56	190	26	47	9	0	6	19	0	31	.247	.389
Brandon Nimmo	55	186	33	52	8	3	8	18	1	33	.280	.484
Jeff McNeil	52	183	19	57	14	0	4	23	0	20	.311	.454
Dominic Smith	50	177	27	56	21	1	10	42	0	14	.316	.616
Robinson Canó	49	171	23	54	9	0	10	30	0	9	.316	.544
Amed Rosario	46	143	20	36	3	1	4	15	0	4	.252	.371
Wilson Ramos	45	142	13	34	6	0	5	15	0	10	.239	.387
Andrés Giménez	49	118	22	31	3	2	3	12	8	7	.263	.398
Luis Guillorme	29	57	6	19	6	0	0	9	2	10	.333	.439
Todd Frazier	14	49	5	11	2	0	2	5	0	1	.224	.388
Jake Marisnick	16	33	4	11	3	0	2	5	0	1	.333	.606
Robinson Chirinos	12	32	1	7	2	0	1	5	0	1	.219	.375
Yoenis Céspedes	8	31	3	5	1	0	2	4	0	2	.161	.387
Tomás Nido	7	24	4	7	1	0	2	6	0	2	.292	.583
Billy Hamilton	17	22	4	1	0	0	0	1	3	1	.045	.045
Guillermo Heredia	7	17	4	4	0	0	2	3	0	1	.235	.588
Brian Dozier	7	15	1	2	0	0	0	0	0	1	.133	.133
Ali Sánchez	5	9	0	1	0	0	0	0	0	1	.111	.111
Ryan Cordell	5	8	0	1	0	0	0	0	1	0	.125	.125
René Rivera	2	4	0	1	0	0	0	0	0	0	.250	.250
Eduardo Núñez	2	2	0	1	0	0	0	0	1	0	.500	.500
Juan Lagares	2	0	0	0	0	0	0	0	0	0	.---	.---
Team totals	60	2023	286	551	106	7	86	278	20	197	.272	.459

=== Pitching ===
Note: W = Wins; L = Losses; ERA = Earned run average; G = Games pitched; GS = Games started; SV = Saves; IP = Innings pitched; H = Hits allowed; R = Runs allowed; ER = Earned runs allowed; BB = Walks allowed; SO = Strikeouts

Player	W	L	ERA	G	GS	SV	IP	H	R	ER	BB	SO
Jacob deGrom	4	2	2.38	12	12	0	68.0	47	21	18	18	104
Rick Porcello	1	7	5.64	12	12	0	59.0	74	41	37	15	54
David Peterson	6	2	3.44	10	9	0	49.2	36	20	19	24	40
Seth Lugo	3	4	5.15	16	7	3	36.2	40	22	21	10	47
Michael Wacha	1	4	6.62	8	7	0	34.0	46	26	25	7	37
Steven Matz	0	5	9.68	9	6	0	30.2	42	33	33	10	36
Jeurys Familia	2	0	3.71	25	0	0	26.2	20	11	11	19	23
Edwin Díaz	2	1	1.75	26	0	6	25.2	18	6	5	14	50
Chasen Shreve	1	0	3.96	17	0	0	25.0	17	12	11	12	34
Jared Hughes	1	2	4.84	18	0	0	22.1	23	17	12	14	21
Justin Wilson	2	1	3.66	23	0	0	19.2	18	10	8	9	23
Erasmo Ramírez	0	0	0.63	6	0	1	14.1	8	1	1	4	9
Robert Gsellman	0	0	9.64	6	4	0	14.0	22	15	15	8	9
Corey Oswalt	0	0	4.85	4	1	0	13.0	14	7	7	2	11
Brad Brach	1	0	5.84	14	0	0	12.1	8	8	8	14	14
Dellin Betances	0	1	7.71	15	0	0	11.2	12	10	10	12	11
Franklyn Kilome	0	1	11.12	4	0	1	11.1	14	14	14	9	13
Miguel Castro	1	2	4.00	10	0	0	9.0	11	5	4	8	14
Walker Lockett	1	0	5.63	2	1	0	8.0	9	5	5	3	8
Drew Smith	0	1	6.43	8	0	0	7.0	6	6	5	2	7
Paul Sewald	0	0	13.50	5	0	0	6.0	12	9	9	4	2
Ariel Jurado	0	0	11.25	1	1	0	4.0	9	5	5	0	2
Hunter Strickland	0	1	8.10	4	0	0	3.1	5	4	3	1	4
Luis Guillorme	0	0	0.00	1	0	0	1.0	0	0	0	0	0
Todd Frazier	0	0	0.00	1	0	0	1.0	0	0	0	0	1
Team totals	26	34	4.98	60	60	11	513.1	511	308	284	219	574

== Farm system ==
Level	Team	League	Manager
AAA	Syracuse Mets	International League	Chad Kreuter
AA	Binghamton Rumble Ponies	Eastern League	Lorenzo Bundy
A-Advanced	St. Lucie Mets	Florida State League	Rich Donnelly
A	Columbia Fireflies	South Atlantic League	Reid Brignac
A-Short Season	Brooklyn Cyclones	New York–Penn League	Ed Blankmeyer
Rookie	Kingsport Mets	Appalachian League	Chris Newell
Rookie	GCL Mets	Gulf Coast League	David Davalillo
Rookie	DSL Mets 1	Dominican Summer League	Manny Martinez
Rookie	DSL Mets 2	Dominican Summer League	Yucary De La Cruz
