= 2020 Philadelphia Phillies season =

Major League Baseball season

2020 Philadelphia Phillies
- League: National League
- Division: East
- Ballpark: Citizens Bank Park
- City: Philadelphia
- Record: 28–32 (.467)
- Divisional place: 3rd
- Owners: John Middleton
- General managers: Matt Klentak
- Managers: Joe Girardi
- Television: NBC Sports Philadelphia; NBC Sports Philadelphia + NBC Philadelphia (Tom McCarthy, John Kruk, Ben Davis, Rubén Amaro Jr., Jimmy Rollins, Gregg Murphy)
- Radio: Phillies Radio Network; WIP SportsRadio 94.1 FM (English) (Scott Franzke, Larry Andersen, Jim Jackson, Kevin Frandsen); WTTM (Spanish) (Danny Martinez, Bill Kulik, Rickie Ricardo)
- Stats: ESPN.com; Baseball Reference

The 2020 Philadelphia Phillies season was the 138th season in the history of the franchise, its 17th season at Citizens Bank Park, and the first season under new manager Joe Girardi.

On March 12, 2020, MLB announced that because of the ongoing COVID-19 pandemic, the start of the regular season would be delayed by at least two weeks in addition to the remainder of spring training being cancelled. Four days later, it was announced that the start of the season would be pushed back indefinitely due to the recommendation made by the CDC to restrict events of more than 50 people for eight weeks. On June 23, commissioner Rob Manfred unilaterally implemented a 60-game season. Players reported to training camp on July 1 in order to resume spring training and prepare for Opening Day on July 24.

On September 19, the Phillies had a 27–25 record and needed to win just two of their final eight games to qualify for the playoffs. However, the Phillies collapsed by only going 1–7, thus encountering their third consecutive September collapse, missing the playoffs for the ninth consecutive season, and failing to improve on their 81–81 record from the previous season.

== Season standings ==
=== National League East ===
NL East
Team	W	L	Pct.	GB	Home	Road
Atlanta Braves	35	25	.583	—	19‍–‍11	16‍–‍14
Miami Marlins	31	29	.517	4	11‍–‍15	20‍–‍14
Philadelphia Phillies	28	32	.467	7	19‍–‍13	9‍–‍19
Washington Nationals	26	34	.433	9	15‍–‍18	11‍–‍16
New York Mets	26	34	.433	9	12‍–‍17	14‍–‍17

=== National League Wild Card ===
Division leaders
Team	W	L	Pct.
Los Angeles Dodgers	43	17	.717
Atlanta Braves	35	25	.583
Chicago Cubs	34	26	.567

Division 2nd place
Team	W	L	Pct.
San Diego Padres	37	23	.617
St. Louis Cardinals	30	28	.517
Miami Marlins	31	29	.517

Wild Card teams (Top 2 teams qualify for postseason)
Team	W	L	Pct.	GB
Cincinnati Reds	31	29	.517	+2
Milwaukee Brewers	29	31	.483	—
San Francisco Giants	29	31	.483	—
Philadelphia Phillies	28	32	.467	1
Washington Nationals	26	34	.433	3
New York Mets	26	34	.433	3
Colorado Rockies	26	34	.433	3
Arizona Diamondbacks	25	35	.417	4
Pittsburgh Pirates	19	41	.317	10

=== Record vs. opponents ===
2020 National League record Source: MLB Standings Grid – 2020
Team	ATL	MIA	NYM	PHI	WSH	AL
Atlanta	—	6–4	7–3	5–5	6–4	11–9
Miami	4–6	—	4–6	7–3	6–4	10–10
New York	3–7	6–4	—	4–6	4–6	9–11
Philadelphia	5–5	3–7	6–4	—	7–3	7–13
Washington	4–6	4–6	6–4	3–7	—	9–11

== Game log ==
2020 Game Log Overall Record: 28–32
July (1–2)

#	Date	Opponent	Score	Win	Loss	Save	Record
1	July 24	Marlins	2–5	Sandy Alcántara (1–0)	**Aaron Nola** (0–1)	Brandon Kintzler (1)	0–1
2	July 25	Marlins	7–1	**Zack Wheeler** (1–0)	Alex Vesia (0–1)	—	1–1
3	July 26	Marlins	6–11	Stephen Tarpley (1–0)	**Cole Irvin** (0–1)	—	1–2
—	July 27	Yankees	Postponed (COVID-19); Makeup: August 5				
—	July 28	Yankees	Postponed (COVID-19); Makeup: August 6				
—	July 29	@ Yankees	Postponed (COVID-19); Makeup: August 3				
—	July 30	@ Yankees	Postponed (COVID-19); Makeup: August 4				
—	July 31	@ Blue Jays (Note: at Citizens Bank Park due to ongoing preparations at the Blue Jays 2020 "home" field (Sahlen Field))	Postponed (COVID-19); Makeup: August 1 as a traditional doubleheader				

August (14–13)

#	Date	Opponent	Score	Win	Loss	Save	Record
—	August 1 (1)	@ Blue Jays	Postponed (COVID-19); Makeup: August 20 as a straight, 7-inning doubleheader				
—	August 1 (2)	@ Blue Jays	Postponed (COVID-19); Makeup: August 20 as a straight, 7-inning doubleheader				
—	August 2	@ Blue Jays	Postponed (COVID-19); Makeup: September 18 as a straight, 7-inning doubleheader				
4	August 3	@ Yankees	3–6	Gerrit Cole (3–0)	**Jake Arrieta** (0–1)	Zack Britton (4)	1–3
—	August 4	@ Marlins	Postponed (COVID-19); Makeup: September 11 as a straight, 7-inning doubleheader				
—	August 4	@ Yankees	Postponed (inclement weather); Makeup: August 5 as a straight, 7-inning doubleheader				
—	August 5	@ Marlins	Postponed (COVID-19); Makeup: Makeup: September 13 as a straight, 7-inning doubleheader				
5	August 5 (1)	@ Yankees (Note: at Citizens Bank Park with the Yankees as the home team)	11–7	**Zack Wheeler** (2–0)	J. A. Happ (0–1)	**Héctor Neris** (1)	2–3
6	August 5 (2)	Yankees	1–3	Adam Ottavino (2–0)	**Tommy Hunter** (0–1)	Zack Britton (5)	2–4
—	August 6	@ Marlins	Postponed (COVID-19); Makeup: September 14 as a single game				
7	August 6	Yankees	5–4	**Deolis Guerra** (1–0)	Jordan Montgomery (1–1)	**Héctor Neris** (2)	3–4
—	August 7	Braves	Postponed (rain); Makeup: August 9 as a straight, 7-inning doubleheader				
8	August 8	Braves	5–0	**Jake Arrieta** (1–1)	Kyle Wright (0–2)	—	4–4
9	August 9 (1)	Braves	2–5	Tyler Matzek (2–0)	**Deolis Guerra** (1–1)	Mark Melancon (3)	4–5
10	August 9 (2)	Braves	0–8	Max Fried (3–0)	**Spencer Howard** (0–1)	—	4–6
11	August 10	Braves	13–8	**Aaron Nola** (1–1)	Sean Newcomb (0–2)	—	5–6
12	August 11	Orioles	9–10 (10)	Cole Sulser (1–1)	**Deolis Guerra** (1–2)	Travis Lakins, Sr. (1)	5–7
13	August 12	Orioles	4–5	Shawn Armstrong (2–0)	**Zach Eflin** (0–1)	Cole Sulser (4)	5–8
14	August 13	Orioles	4–11	Tom Eshelman (1–0)	**Jake Arrieta** (1–2)	—	5–9
15	August 14	Mets	6–5	**Héctor Neris** (1–0)	Seth Lugo (1–2)	—	6–9
16	August 15	Mets	6–2	**Aaron Nola** (2–1)	Steven Matz (0–4)	—	7–9
17	August 16	Mets	6–2	**Zack Wheeler** (3–0)	Rick Porcello (1–3)	—	8–9
18	August 18	@ Red Sox	13–6	**Blake Parker** (1–0)	Josh Taylor (0–1)	—	9–9
19	August 19	@ Red Sox	3–6	Austin Brice (1–0)	**Jake Arrieta** (1–3)	Brandon Workman (4)	9–10
20	August 20 (1)	@ Blue Jays	2–3	Jordan Romano (2–1)	**Deolis Guerra** (1–3)	—	9–11
21	August 20 (2)	@ Blue Jays	8–9	Anthony Kay (2–0)	**Héctor Neris** (1–1)	A. J. Cole (1)	9–12
22	August 21	@ Braves	2–11	Max Fried (4–0)	**Aaron Nola** (2–2)	—	9–13
23	August 22	@ Braves	5–6	Mark Melancon (2–0)	**Brandon Workman** (0–1)	—	9–14
24	August 23	@ Braves	5–4	**Zach Eflin** (1–1)	Josh Tomlin (1–1)	**Brandon Workman** (5)	10–14
25	August 25	@ Nationals	8–3	**Jake Arrieta** (2–3)	Erick Fedde (1–2)	—	11–14
26	August 26	@ Nationals	3–2	**Aaron Nola** (3–2)	Will Harris (0–1)	**Brandon Workman** (6)	12–14
—	August 27	@ Nationals	Postponed (strikes due to shooting of Jacob Blake); Makeup: September 22 as a straight, 7-inning doubleheader				
27	August 28	Braves	7–4 (11)	**Blake Parker** (2–0)	Mark Melancon (2–1)	—	13–14
28	August 29	Braves	4–1	**Zach Eflin** (2–1)	Josh Tomlin (1–2)	**Brandon Workman** (7)	14–14
29	August 30	Braves	10–12	A. J. Minter (1–0)	**Jake Arrieta** (2–4)	Mark Melancon (6)	14–15
30	August 31	Nationals	8–6	**Spencer Howard** (1–1)	Erick Fedde (1–3)	—	15–15

September (13–17)

#	Date	Opponent	Score	Win	Loss	Save	Record
31	September 1	Nationals	6–0	**Aaron Nola** (4–2)	Patrick Corbin (2–3)	—	16–15
32	September 2	Nationals	3–0	**Zack Wheeler** (4–0)	Max Scherzer (3–2)	**Brandon Workman** (8)	17–15
33	September 3	Nationals	6–5 (10)	**Blake Parker** (3–0)	Sean Doolittle (0–2)	—	18–15
34	September 4	@ Mets	5–3	**Jake Arrieta** (3–4)	Jared Hughes (1–2)	**Brandon Workman** (9)	19–15
35	September 5	@ Mets	1–5	Seth Lugo (2–2)	**Spencer Howard** (1–2)	—	19–16
36	September 6	@ Mets	1–14	Jacob deGrom (3–1)	**Aaron Nola** (4–3)	—	19–17
37	September 7	@ Mets	9–8 (10)	**Brandon Workman** (1–1)	Miguel Castro (1–1)	**Héctor Neris** (3)	20–17
38	September 8 (1)	Red Sox	6–5	**Héctor Neris** (2–1)	Matt Barnes (1–3)	—	21–17
39	September 8 (2)	Red Sox	2–5	Chris Mazza (1–1)	**David Phelps** (2–4)	Marcus Walden (1)	21–18
40	September 10	@ Marlins	5–6	Yimi García (1–0)	**Brandon Workman** (1–2)	—	21–19
41	September 11 (1)	@ Marlins	11–0	**Aaron Nola** (5–3)	Trevor Rogers (1–1)	—	22–19
42	September 11 (2)	@ Marlins	3–5	James Hoyt (2–0)	**Ranger Suárez** (0–1)	Yimi García (1)	22–20
43	September 12	@ Marlins	12–6	**Heath Hembree** (3–0)	José Ureña (0–1)	—	23–20
44	September 13 (1)	@ Marlins	1–2	Sixto Sánchez (3–1)	**Ramón Rosso** (0–1)	—	23–21
45	September 13 (2)	@ Marlins	1–8	Braxton Garrett (1–0)	**Zach Eflin** (2–2)	—	23–22
46	September 14	@ Marlins	2–6	Pablo López (4–4)	**Vince Velasquez** (0–1)	—	23–23
47	September 15	Mets	4–1	**Jake Arrieta** (4–4)	Rick Porcello (1–5)	**Héctor Neris** (4)	24–23
48	September 16	Mets	4–5	Miguel Castro (2–1)	**Héctor Neris** (2–2)	Edwin Díaz (4)	24–24
49	September 17	Mets	6–10	Justin Wilson (2–1)	**Brandon Workman** (1–3)	—	24–25
50	September 18 (1)	@ Blue Jays (Note: at Citizens Bank Park with the Blue Jays as the home team)	7–0	**Zach Eflin** (3–2)	Robbie Ray (2–5)	—	25–25
51	September 18 (2)	Blue Jays	8–7	**Connor Brogdon** (1–0)	Rafael Dolis (2–2)	**Héctor Neris** (5)	26–25
52	September 19	Blue Jays	3–1	**Vince Velasquez** (1–1)	Hyun-jin Ryu (4–2)	**Tommy Hunter** (1)	27–25
53	September 20	Blue Jays	3–6	Taijuan Walker (4–3)	**Adonis Medina** (0–1)	Anthony Bass (6)	27–26
54	September 21	@ Nationals	1–5	Aníbal Sánchez (3–5)	**Zack Wheeler** (4–1)	—	27–27
55	September 22 (1)	@ Nationals	1–5	Austin Voth (1–5)	**Aaron Nola** (5–4)	—	27–28
56	September 22 (2)	@ Nationals	7–8 (8)	Daniel Hudson (3–2)	**Brandon Workman** (1–4)	—	27–29
57	September 23	@ Nationals	12–3	**Zach Eflin** (4–2)	Erick Fedde (2–4)	—	28–29
58	September 25	@ Rays	4–6	Nick Anderson (2–1)	**Adam Morgan** (0–1)	John Curtiss (2)	28–30
59	September 26	@ Rays	3–4	Peter Fairbanks (6–3)	**Zack Wheeler** (4–2)	Aaron Slegers (1)	28–31
60	September 27	@ Rays	0–5	Josh Fleming (5–0)	**Aaron Nola** (5–5)	—	28–32

Legend: = Win = Loss = Postponement
Bold = Phillies team member

== Roster ==
All players who made an appearance for the Phillies during 2020 are included.

2020 Philadelphia Phillies
Roster
Pitchers: 52 José Álvarez; 49 Jake Arrieta; 75 Connor Brogdon; 66 Garrett Cleavinger; 54 Austin Davis; 56 Zach Eflin; 57 Deolis Guerra; 41 David Hale; 43 Heath Hembree; 48 Spencer Howard; 96 Tommy Hunter; 47 Cole Irvin; 67 Trevor Kelley; 63 Mauricio Llovera; 39 Reggie McClain; 77 Adonis Medina; 46 Adam Morgan; 50 Héctor Neris; 27 Aaron Nola; 53 Blake Parker; 31 David Phelps; 43 Nick Pivetta; 79 JoJo Romero; 60 Ramón Rosso; 55 Ranger Suárez; 21 Vince Velasquez; 45 Zack Wheeler; 44 Brandon Workman	Catchers: 15,7,5 Andrew Knapp; 13 Rafael Marchan; 10 J. T. Realmuto; Infielders: 28 Alec Bohm; 18 Didi Gregorius; 17 Rhys Hoskins; 4 Scott Kingery; 2 Jean Segura; 74 Ronald Torreyes; 12 Neil Walker	Outfielders: 9 Jay Bruce; 23 Kyle Garlick; 8 Phil Gosselin; 3 Bryce Harper; 40 Adam Haseley; 22 Andrew McCutchen; 16 Mickey Moniak; 24 Roman Quinn	Manager: 25 Joe Girardi; Coaches: 81 Greg Brodzinski (bullpen catcher); 91 Juan Castro (infield coach); 33 Joe Dillon (hitting); 38 Paco Figueroa (first base coach); 35 Jim Gott (bullpen); 95 Pedro Guerrero (assistant hitting); 94 David Lundquist (assistant pitching); 92 Bobby Meacham (assistant coach); 19 Bryan Price (pitching); 82 Bob Stumpo (bullpen catcher); 59 Rob Thomson (bench); 62 Dusty Wathan (third base coach)

== Player stats ==
=== Batting ===
Note: G = Games played; AB = At bats; R = Runs; H = Hits; 2B = Doubles; 3B = Triples; HR = Home runs; RBI = Runs batted in; SB = Stolen bases; BB = Walks; AVG = Batting average; SLG = Slugging average

Player	G	AB	R	H	2B	3B	HR	RBI	SB	BB	AVG	SLG
Andrew McCutchen	57	217	32	55	9	0	10	34	4	22	.253	.433
Didi Gregorius	60	215	34	61	10	2	10	40	3	15	.284	.488
Jean Segura	54	192	28	51	5	2	7	25	2	23	.266	.422
Bryce Harper	58	190	41	51	9	2	13	33	8	49	.268	.542
J. T. Realmuto	47	173	33	46	6	0	11	32	4	16	.266	.491
Alec Bohm	44	160	24	54	11	0	4	23	1	16	.338	.481
Rhys Hoskins	41	151	35	37	9	0	10	26	1	29	.245	.503
Scott Kingery	36	113	12	18	5	0	3	6	0	9	.159	.283
Roman Quinn	41	108	14	23	3	1	2	7	12	5	.213	.315
Jay Bruce	32	96	11	19	4	2	6	14	0	7	.198	.469
Phil Gosselin	39	92	14	23	5	0	3	12	0	10	.250	.402
Adam Haseley	40	79	7	22	5	0	0	13	0	7	.278	.342
Andrew Knapp	33	72	9	20	4	1	2	15	0	15	.278	.444
Neil Walker	18	39	5	9	3	0	0	3	0	1	.231	.308
Kyle Garlick	12	22	0	3	1	0	0	3	0	0	.136	.182
Mickey Moniak	8	14	3	3	0	0	0	0	0	4	.214	.214
Rafael Marchán	3	8	3	4	0	0	1	3	0	1	.500	.875
Ronald Torreyes	4	7	1	1	1	0	0	0	0	0	.143	.286
Team totals	60	1945	306	500	90	10	82	289	35	229	.257	.439

=== Pitching ===
Note: W = Wins; L = Losses; ERA = Earned run average; G = Games pitched; GS = Games started; SV = Saves; IP = Innings pitched; H = Hits allowed; R = Runs allowed; ER = Earned runs allowed; BB = Walks allowed; SO = Strikeouts

Player	W	L	ERA	G	GS	SV	IP	H	R	ER	BB	SO
Aaron Nola	5	5	3.28	12	12	0	71.1	54	31	26	23	96
Zach Wheeler	4	2	2.92	11	11	0	71.0	67	26	23	16	53
Zach Eflin	4	2	3.97	11	10	0	59.0	60	28	26	15	70
Jake Arrieta	4	4	5.08	9	9	0	44.1	51	25	25	16	32
Vince Velasquez	1	1	5.56	9	7	0	34.0	36	21	21	17	46
Tommy Hunter	0	1	4.01	24	0	1	24.2	22	11	11	6	25
Spencer Howard	1	2	5.92	6	6	0	24.1	30	17	16	10	23
Héctor Neris	2	2	4.57	24	0	5	21.2	24	15	11	13	27
Blake Parker	3	0	2.81	14	1	0	16.0	12	7	5	9	25
Adam Morgan	0	1	5.54	17	0	0	13.0	14	8	8	6	16
Brandon Workman	1	4	6.92	14	0	5	13.0	23	11	10	9	15
Connor Brogdon	1	0	3.97	9	0	0	11.1	5	5	5	5	17
David Hale	0	0	4.09	6	2	0	11.0	16	5	5	1	7
JoJo Romero	0	0	7.59	12	0	0	10.2	13	10	9	2	10
Ramón Rosso	0	1	6.52	7	1	0	9.2	9	7	7	8	11
Heath Hembree	1	0	12.54	11	0	0	9.1	17	13	13	5	10
David Phelps	0	1	12.91	10	0	0	7.2	12	11	11	3	11
Deolis Guerra	1	3	8.59	9	0	0	7.1	10	9	7	2	8
José Álvarez	0	0	1.42	8	0	0	6.1	7	1	1	3	6
Nick Pivetta	0	0	15.88	3	0	0	5.2	10	10	10	1	4
Reggie McClain	0	0	5.06	5	0	0	5.1	9	6	3	3	2
Adonis Medina	0	1	4.50	1	1	0	4.0	3	2	2	3	4
Ranger Suárez	0	1	20.25	3	0	0	4.0	10	9	9	4	1
Cole Irvin	0	1	17.18	3	0	0	3.2	11	7	7	1	4
Trevor Kelley	0	0	10.80	4	0	0	3.1	8	4	4	1	5
Austin Davis	0	0	21.00	4	0	0	3.0	10	7	7	1	2
Mauricio Llovera	0	0	36.00	1	0	0	1.0	5	4	4	1	1
Garrett Cleavinger	0	0	13.50	1	0	0	0.2	2	1	1	0	1
Neil Walker	0	0	0.00	1	0	0	0.2	0	0	0	1	0
Team totals	28	32	5.14	60	60	11	497.0	550	311	284	185	532

== Season summary ==
=== July ===
The Phillies dropped their home opener, 2–5, against Marlins but was highlighted by shortstop Didi Gregorius' home run. The team rebounded with a 7–1 victory the next day powered by Gregorius' second home run and designated hitter Phil Gosselin's 2-home run performance to give pitcher Zack Wheeler the victory in his Phillies' debut. The Marlins won the rubber match, 11–6, as the Phillies left the bases loaded 3 times in the latter half of the game.

=== COVID-19 outbreak ===
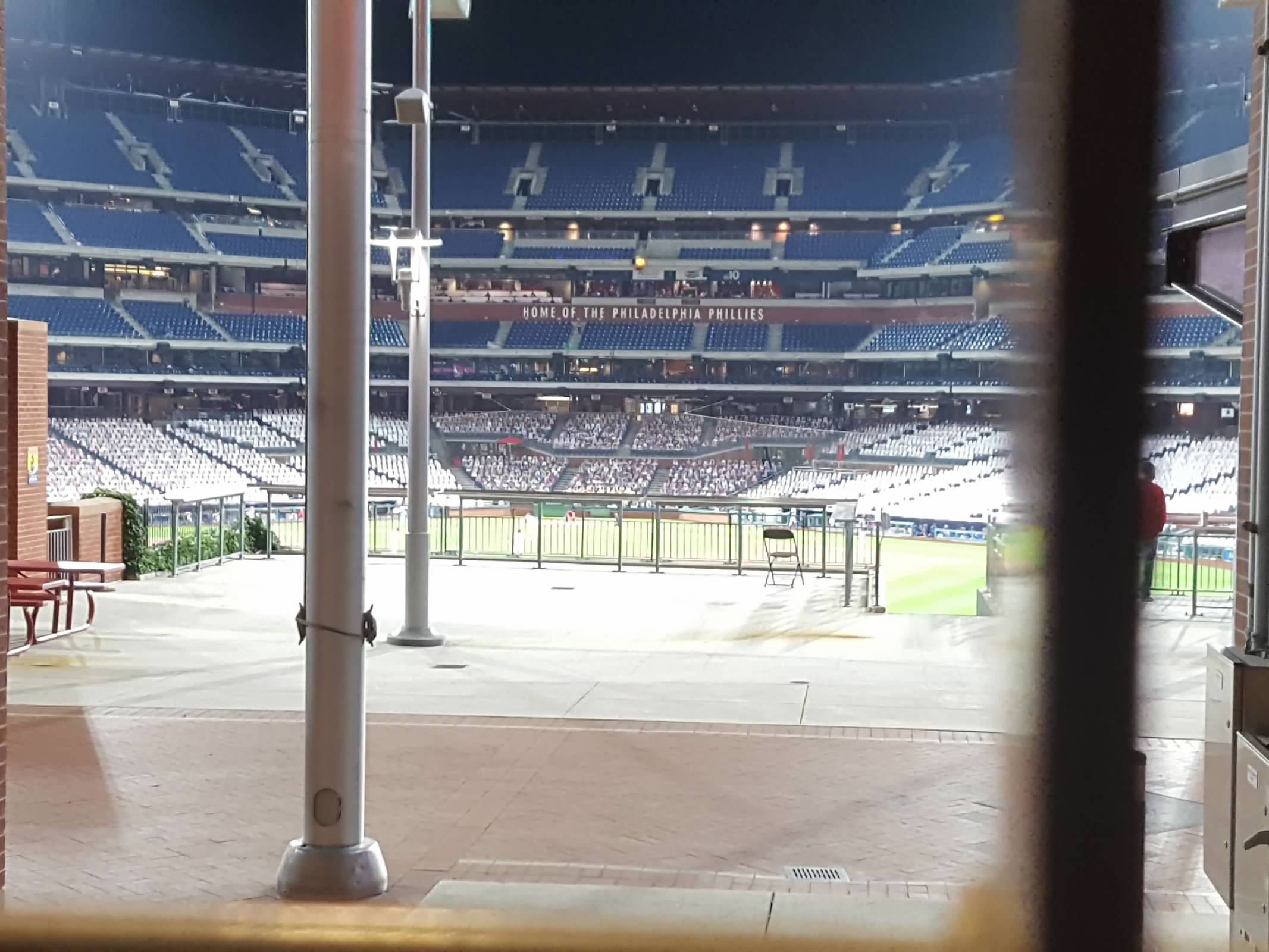
Philadelphia Phillies host the New York Mets without fans at Citizens Bank Park on September 16, 2020 as viewed from behind centerfield gate with Phandemic Krew.

The Marlins' opening day catcher Jorge Alfaro was placed on the injured list after testing positive for COVID-19 earlier in the day. First baseman Garrett Cooper and outfielder Harold Ramírez also tested positive for COVID-19 shortly thereafter. Two days later prior to the final game of the opening series, Marlins' pitcher José Ureña tested positive for COVID-19 and was scratched from his start. Following the game the Marlins delayed their flight back to Miami due to concerns of an outbreak.

On July 27, the Marlins' home opener against the Baltimore Orioles was postponed amid reports that eight new players had tested positive for COVID-19. Reports stated that 11 Marlins players and two coaches had tested positive. MLB also postponed the Phillies' next game against the Yankees as the Yankees would be using the same clubhouse as the Marlins. The Marlins remained in Philadelphia pending further testing.

On July 28, sources reported that at least four more members of the Marlins had tested positive for COVID-19. In five days, the Marlins had a total of 17 people test positive for the virus. On the same day, the MLB announced that the Marlins and Phillies seasons would be put on hold and their opponents' schedules adjusted.

The Phillies' home-and-home series with the New York Yankees was postponed due to the COVID-19 outbreak. The July 31 game with the Toronto Blue Jays was also postponed and rescheduled as an August 1 traditional doubleheader. However, on July 30 after an unnamed coach and Phillies' clubhouse worker tested positive (which were later determined to be false positives), the Blue Jays series was postponed.

=== August ===
As Major League Baseball juggled the schedules, the Phillies opened August with a home-and-home series with the Yankees, making up games postponed from the previous week. Hours before the first pitch on August 3, the next day's game was postponed due to the impending inclement weather with the approach of Hurricane Isaias, setting up a doubleheader at Citizens Bank Park where each team would take turns at being the home team. Earning a split of the 4-game Yankees' series, the Phillies went on to split the 4-game Atlanta Braves' series. After being swept in a 3-games series by the Baltimore Orioles, the Phillies completed their homestand by sweeping the New York Mets.

In their first real roadtrip of the season (they had played a single game in New York earlier in the month but traveled back to Philadelphia after the game), the Phillies split a 2-game series with the Boston Red Sox. After leading early in both games of a doubleheader against in the Blue Jays, the Phillies were swept in the brief 1-day stay in Buffalo, New York, the Jays' home stadium (Sahlen Field) in 2020 due to the pandemic. In Atlanta, the Phillies led early in the opening 2 games of the series only to have the bullpen lose the games in the final innings. In the Atlanta finale, broadcast on ESPN's Sunday Night Baseball, the Phillies held on for a 5–4 victory with the game-tying run thrown out at home plate to end the game.

=== Playoffs again not reached ===
On September 27, 2020, the Phillies lost the season finale to the Tampa Bay Rays, 5–0, and they were therefore not eligible for the playoffs. If the Phillies had won that game and the San Francisco Giants and the Milwaukee Brewers had lost, they would have clinched the eighth playoff spot. The Giants and Brewers both lost their games.

=== Phandemic Krew ===
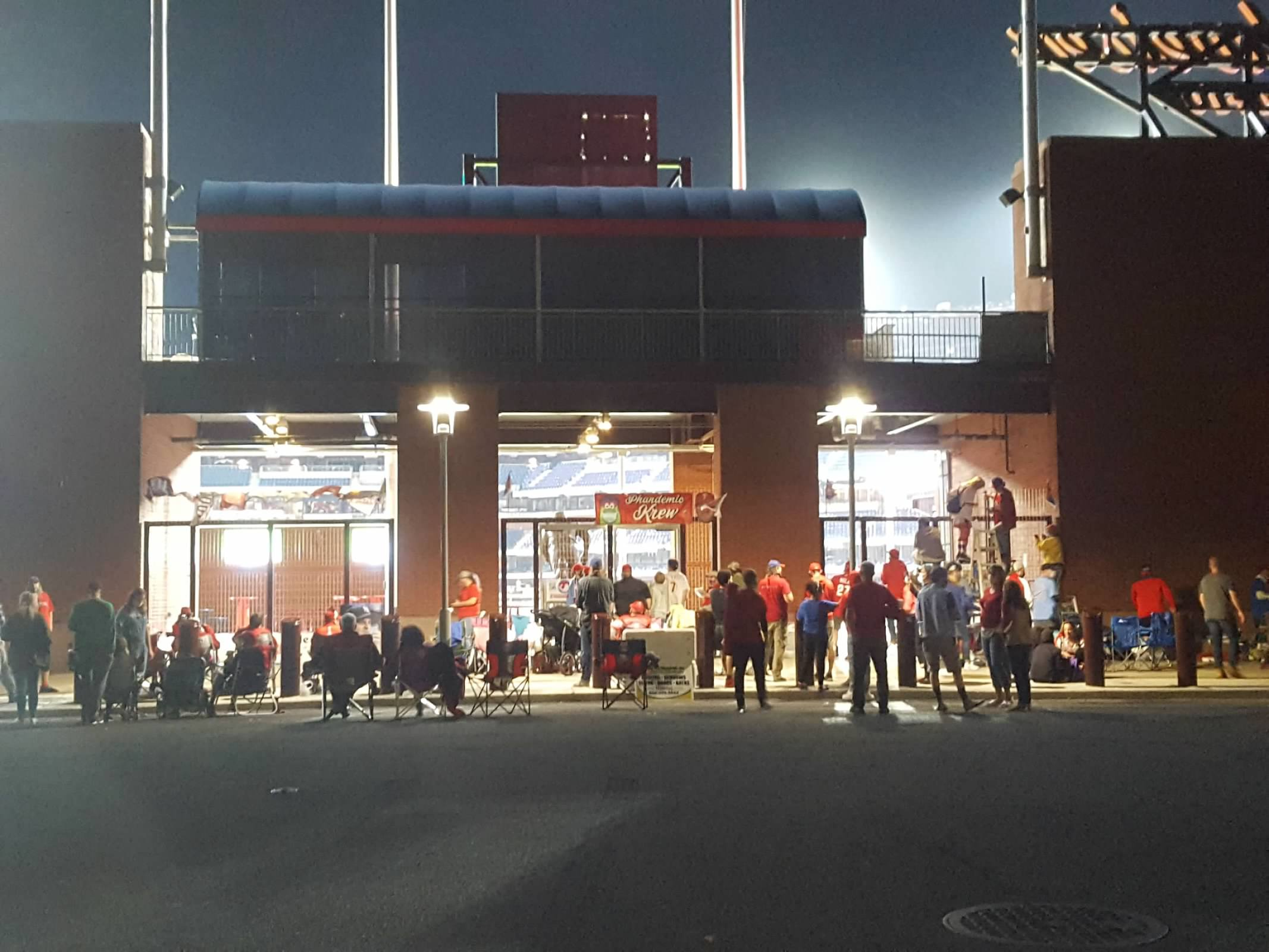
Fans watch the Philadelphia Phillies host the New York Mets outside centerfield gate at Citizens Bank Park on September 16, 2020

While no tickets were sold and the gates closed to the public at Phillies home games at Citizens Bank Park, two fans organized a group they called the Phandemic Krew which gathered every game behind the centerfield gate beyond Ashburn Alley and with five ladders propped against the gates, watched and cheered the games. The name was a tribute to the city, the circumstances, and Bryce Harper's son Krew — and they created a logo that featured the Phillie Phanatic's hand hand blowing an air horn. Up to fifty fans would gather behind centerfield every home game, and over the shortened season decorated the outside with team pennants, and signs calling for Dick Allen to be elected to the Baseball Hall of Fame, and for the firing of general manager Matt Klentak. The Phandemic Krew equally showed for road games for which the team would leave on the television monitors on the concourse visible from the behind the gate.

The fans' drums, cheers, live applause, and air horns could be heard on live broadcasts and by the players in the empty ballpark. Yankees manager Aaron Boone protested that the fans were blowing the air horns as Phillies pitcher Zach Efflin pitched to the Yankees during the third inning of the game on August 6, 2020. Phillies catcher J.T. Realmuto would tell the press that he could hear the fans cheering and chanting for the Phillies to re-sign him after the season.

At the end of the season, Phillies outfielder Andrew McCutchen would tweet his appreciation to the Krew; manager Joe Girardi had pizzas delivered to the fans; and the two organizers of the Krew would partner with the Phillies to produce a bobble head the proceeds of which were donated to charity.

== Farm system ==
Due to safety concerns surrounding the COVID-19 pandemic, it was announced on June 30, 2020, that the 2020 Minor League Baseball season would not be played.

Level	Team	League	Manager
AAA	Lehigh Valley IronPigs	International League	Gary Jones
AA	Reading Fightin Phils	Eastern League	Greg Legg
A-Advanced	Clearwater Threshers	Florida State League	Shawn Williams
A	Lakewood BlueClaws	South Atlantic League	Marty Malloy
A-Short Season	Williamsport Crosscutters	New York–Penn League	Pat Borders
Rookie	GCL Phillies	Gulf Coast League	Roly de Armas
Rookie	DSL Phillies	Dominican Summer League	Waner Santana
