= 2020 Atlanta Braves season =

2020 Atlanta Braves
- National League East champions
- League: National League
- Division: East
- Ballpark: Truist Park
- City: Atlanta
- Record: 35–25 (.583)
- Divisional place: 1st
- Owners: Liberty Media/John Malone
- General managers: Alex Anthopoulos
- Managers: Brian Snitker
- Television: Fox Sports Southeast; Fox Sports South (Chip Caray, Jeff Francoeur, Paul Byrd, Tom Glavine, Dale Murphy, Joe Simpson)
- Radio: 680 The Fan; Rock 100.5; Atlanta Braves Radio Network (Jim Powell, Don Sutton, Joe Simpson)

The 2020 Atlanta Braves season was the Braves' 55th season in Atlanta, 150th overall, and fourth season at Truist Park.

On March 12, 2020, MLB announced that because of the ongoing COVID-19 pandemic, the start of the regular season would be delayed by at least two weeks in addition to the remainder of spring training being cancelled. Four days later, it was announced that the start of the season would be pushed back indefinitely due to the recommendation made by the CDC to restrict events of more than 50 people for eight weeks. On June 23, commissioner Rob Manfred unilaterally implemented a 60-game season. Players reported to training camps on July 1 in order to resume spring training and prepare for a July 24 Opening Day. The Braves began the season at the New York Mets on July 24 and ended the season at home against the Boston Red Sox on September 27.

Due to the pandemic and the shortened season, Major League Baseball instituted certain rule changes which included the use of a universal designated hitter, a runner on second base to start extra innings, and a revised schedule.

In a series against the Boston Red Sox at Fenway Park, Marcell Ozuna and Adam Duvall became the first pair of teammates in MLB history to hit three home runs in consecutive games, Ozuna doing so on September 1 and Duvall on September 2. In their game against the Miami Marlins on September 9, the Braves scored 29 runs, one short of the MLB record set by the Texas Rangers in 2007. On September 22, the Braves clinched the National League East for the third straight year with a 11–1 win over the Miami Marlins. They then swept the Cincinnati Reds in the NLWCS for their first post-season series win since the 2001 season. They also swept the Miami Marlins in the NLDS and advanced to the NLCS, their first NLCS appearance since 2001. They lost to the Los Angeles Dodgers in the NLCS after leading 3–1.

The Braves led MLB in hits (556), doubles (130), runs batted in (338), on-base percentage (.349), on-base plus slugging (.832), total bases (1,001) and plate appearances (2,344).

== Offseason ==
=== Transactions ===
==== October 2019 ====
- October 31: Francisco Cervelli, Darren O'Day, Brian McCann (announced his retirement following the Braves elimination for the division series), Josh Donaldson, Dallas Keuchel, Jerry Blevins, Chris Martin, Anthony Swarzak, Matt Joyce, Josh Tomlin, and Adeiny Hechavarria elected free agency.

==== November 2019 ====
- November 4: Billy Hamilton and Julio Teheran had their options declined by the Braves and both players elected free agency.
- November 8: Darren O'Day re-signed with the Braves on a one-year, $2.5 million contract with a club option for a second year.
- November 14: Will Smith agreed on a three-year, $39 million contract. The deal includes a fourth year option worth $13 million with a $1 million buyout.
- November 19: Chris Martin re-signed with the Braves on a two-year, $14 million contract.
- November 24: Travis d'Arnaud signed a two-year, $16 million contract.

==== December 2019 ====
- December 3: Cole Hamels signed a one-year, $18 million contract.

==== January 2020 ====
- January 16: Adeiny Hechavarria re-signed with the Braves on a one-year, $1 million contract.
- January 21: Marcell Ozuna signed a one-year, $18 million contract.

== Regular season ==
=== National League East ===
NL East
Team	W	L	Pct.	GB	Home	Road
Atlanta Braves	35	25	.583	—	19‍–‍11	16‍–‍14
Miami Marlins	31	29	.517	4	11‍–‍15	20‍–‍14
Philadelphia Phillies	28	32	.467	7	19‍–‍13	9‍–‍19
Washington Nationals	26	34	.433	9	15‍–‍18	11‍–‍16
New York Mets	26	34	.433	9	12‍–‍17	14‍–‍17

=== National League Wild Card ===
Division leaders
Team	W	L	Pct.
Los Angeles Dodgers	43	17	.717
Atlanta Braves	35	25	.583
Chicago Cubs	34	26	.567

Division 2nd place
Team	W	L	Pct.
San Diego Padres	37	23	.617
St. Louis Cardinals	30	28	.517
Miami Marlins	31	29	.517

Wild Card teams (Top 2 teams qualify for postseason)
Team	W	L	Pct.	GB
Cincinnati Reds	31	29	.517	+2
Milwaukee Brewers	29	31	.483	—
San Francisco Giants	29	31	.483	—
Philadelphia Phillies	28	32	.467	1
Washington Nationals	26	34	.433	3
New York Mets	26	34	.433	3
Colorado Rockies	26	34	.433	3
Arizona Diamondbacks	25	35	.417	4
Pittsburgh Pirates	19	41	.317	10

=== Record vs. opponents ===
2020 National League record Source: MLB Standings Grid – 2020
Team}}!style="background-color: #13274F !important; color: #FFFFFF !important; box-shadow: inset 2px 2px 0 #CE1141, inset -2px -2px 0 #CE1141; !important; width:35px;"STLSF	AL					
Atlanta	—	6–4	7–3	5–5	6–4	11–9
Miami	4–6	—	4–6	7–3	6–4	10–10
New York	3–7	6–4	—	4–6	4–6	9–11
Philadelphia	5–5	3–7	6–4	—	7–3	7–13
Washington	4–6	4–6	6–4	3–7	—	9–11

=== Opening Day starters ===
Name	Pos.
Ronald Acuña Jr.	RF
Ozzie Albies	2B
Freddie Freeman	1B
Marcell Ozuna	LF
Matt Adams	DH
Austin Riley	3B
Dansby Swanson	SS
Ender Inciarte	CF
Alex Jackson	C
Mike Soroka	SP

=== Game log ===
Due to the COVID-19 pandemic, the regular season was shortened to 60 games with teams playing 10 games against each other member of their division while also playing four games against each team in the corresponding division in the other league. The Braves will, therefore, play 10 games against each team in their division and four games against each team in the American League East Division. On July 6, MLB announced the Braves' 60-game schedule which will begin on July 24 and end on September 27.

2020 Game Log: 35–25 (Home: 19–11; Away: 16–14)
July: 5–3 (Home: 3–0; Away: 2–3)

#	Date	Opponent	Score	Win	Loss	Save	Record	Box/Streak
1	July 24	@ Mets	0–1	Lugo (1–0)	**Martin** (0–1)	Díaz (1)	0–1	L1
2	July 25	@ Mets	5–3 (10)	**Jackson** (1–0)	Strickland (0–1)	—	1–1	W1
3	July 26	@ Mets	14–1	**Chacín** (1–0)	Porcello (0–1)	—	2–1	W2
4	July 27	@ Rays	5–14	Castillo (1–0)	**Foltynewicz** (0–1)	—	2–2	L1
5	July 28	@ Rays	2–5	Fairbanks (1–0)	**Wright** (0–1)	Drake (2)	2–3	L2
6	July 29	Rays	7–4	**O'Day** (1–0)	Drake (0–1)	**Melancon** (1)	3–3	W1
7	July 30	Rays	2–1	**Fried** (1–0)	Yarbrough (0–1)	**Melancon** (2)	4–3	W2
8	July 31	Mets	11–10	**Dayton** (1–0)	Lugo (1–1)	**Martin** (1)	5–3	W3

August: 15–12 (Home: 9–5; Away: 6–7)

#	Date	Opponent	Score	Win	Loss	Save	Record	Box/Streak
9	August 1	Mets	7–1	**Tomlin** (1–0)	Wacha (1–1)	—	6–3	W4
10	August 2	Mets	4–0	**Matzek** (1–0)	Peterson (1–1)	—	7–3	W5
11	August 3	Mets	2–7	deGrom (1–0)	**Soroka** (0–1)	—	7–4	L1
12	August 4	Blue Jays	10–1	**Fried** (2–0)	Shoemaker (0–1)	—	8–4	W1
13	August 5	Blue Jays	1–2	Ryu (1–1)	**Newcomb** (0–1)	Bass (2)	8–5	L1
14	August 6	Blue Jays	4–3	**Melancon** (1–0)	Font (0–1)	—	9–5	W1
15	August 8	@ Phillies	0–5	Arrieta (1–1)	**Wright** (0–2)	—	9–6	L1
16	August 9	@ Phillies	5–2 (7)	**Matzek** (2–0)	Guerra (1–1)	**Melancon** (3)	10–6	W1
17	August 9	@ Phillies	8–0 (7)	**Fried** (3–0)	Howard (0–1)	—	11–6	W2
18	August 10	@ Phillies	8–13	Nola (1–1)	**Newcomb** (0–2)	—	11–7	L1
19	August 11	@ Yankees	6–9	Montgomery (2–1)	**Toussaint** (0–1)	Britton (6)	11–8	L2
20	August 12	@ Yankees	3–6	Loáisiga (2–0)	**Matzek** (2–1)	Britton (7)	11–9	L3
21	August 14	@ Marlins	2–8	López (2–1)	**Wright** (0–3)	—	11–10	L4
22	August 15	@ Marlins	2–1	**Smith** (1–0)	Kintzler (1–1)	**Melancon** (4)	12–10	W1
23	August 16	@ Marlins	4–0	**O'Day** (2–0)	Vincent (1–1)	—	13–10	W2
24	August 17	Nationals	7–6	**Smith** (2–0)	Hudson (1–2)	—	14–10	W3
25	August 18	Nationals	5–8	Suero (1–0)	**Matzek** (2–2)	Hudson (5)	14–11	L1
26	August 21	Phillies	11–2	**Fried** (4–0)	Nola (2–2)	—	15–11	W1
27	August 22	Phillies	6–5	**Melancon** (2–0)	Workman (0–1)	—	16–11	W2
28	August 23	Phillies	4–5	Eflin (1–1)	**Tomlin** (1–1)	Workman (5)	16–12	L1
29	August 26	Yankees	5–1 (7)	**Anderson** (1–0)	Cole (4–1)	—	17–12	W1
30	August 26	Yankees	2–1 (7)	**Fried** (5–0)	Green (2–1)	**Melancon** (5)	18–12	W2
31	August 28	@ Phillies	4–7 (11)	Parker (2–0)	**Melancon** (2–1)	—	18–13	L1
32	August 29	@ Phillies	1–4	Eflin (2–1)	**Tomlin** (1–2)	Workman (7)	18–14	L2
33	August 30	@ Phillies	12–10	**Minter** (1–0)	Arrieta (2–4)	**Melancon** (6)	19–14	W1
34	August 31	@ Red Sox	6–3	**Fried** (6–0)	Brewer (0–3)	**Melancon** (7)	20–14	W2

September: 15–10 (Home: 7–6; Away: 8–4)

#	Date	Opponent	Score	Win	Loss	Save	Record	Box/Streak
35	September 1	@ Red Sox	10–3	**Anderson** (2–0)	Stock (0–1)	—	21–14	W3
36	September 2	@ Red Sox	7–5	**Matzek** (3–2)	Triggs (0–2)	**Melancon** (8)	22–14	W4
37	September 4	Nationals	7–1 (7)	**O'Day** (3–0)	Voth (0–5)	—	23–14	W5
38	September 4	Nationals	9–10 (7)	Suero (2–0)	**Smith** (2–1)	Hudson (7)	23–15	L1
39	September 5	Nationals	4–10	McGowin (1–0)	**Matzek** (3–3)	—	23–16	L2
40	September 6	Nationals	10–3	**Tomlin** (2–2)	Corbin (2–4)	—	24–16	W1
41	September 7	Marlins	4–5 (10)	Kintzler (2–3)	**Minter** (1–1)	Vincent (3)	24–17	L1
42	September 8	Marlins	0–8	Sánchez (2–1)	**Wright** (0–4)	—	24–18	L2
43	September 9	Marlins	29–9	**Dayton** (2–0)	López (3–4)	**Wilson** (1)	25–18	W1
44	September 10	@ Nationals	7–6	**Martin** (1–1)	Rainey (1–1)	**Melancon** (9)	26–18	W2
45	September 11	@ Nationals	7–8 (12)	Bourque (1–0)	**Dayton** (2–1)	—	26–19	L1
46	September 12	@ Nationals	2–1	**Anderson** (3–0)	Corbin (2–5)	**Melancon** (10)	27–19	W1
47	September 13	@ Nationals	8–4	**Wright** (1–4)	Scherzer (4–3)	—	28–19	W2
48	September 14	@ Orioles	1–14	López (2–0)	**Toussaint** (0–2)	—	28–20	L1
49	September 15	@ Orioles	5–1	**O'Day** (4–0)	Eshelman (3–1)	—	29–20	W1
50	September 16	@ Orioles	1–5	Akin (1–1)	**Hamels** (0–1)	—	29–21	L1
51	September 18	@ Mets	15–2	**Fried** (7–0)	Matz (0–5)	—	30–21	W1
52	September 19	@ Mets	2–7	Peterson (5–2)	**Anderson** (3–1)	—	30–22	L1
53	September 20	@ Mets	7–0	**Wright** (2–4)	Porcello (1–6)	—	31–22	W1
54	September 21	Marlins	5–4	**Matzek** (4–3)	Rogers (1–2)	**Melancon** (11)	32–22	W2
55	September 22	Marlins	11–1	**Wilson** (1–0)	Ureña (0–3)	—	33–22	W3
56	September 23	Marlins	9–4	**Jackson** (2–0)	Smith (1–1)	—	34–22	W4
57	September 24	Marlins	2–4	López (6–4)	**Anderson** (3–2)	Kintzler (11)	34–23	L1
58	September 25	Red Sox	8–7 (11)	**Greene** (1–0)	Springs (0–2)	—	35–23	W1
59	September 26	Red Sox	2–8	Houck (3–0)	**Davidson** (0–1)	—	35–24	L1
60	September 27	Red Sox	1–9	Pivetta (2–0)	**Smith** (2–2)	—	35–25	L2

Legend: = Win = Loss = Postponement
Bold = Braves team member

== Roster ==
Due to the COVID-19 pandemic and the resulting proposed shortened season, teams started the season with a 30-man roster. The rosters were reduce to 28 after two weeks and then to the new-normal roster size of 26 after that.

2020 Atlanta Braves
Roster
Pitchers: 48 Ian Anderson; 48 Jhoulys Chacín; 64 Tucker Davidson; 75 Grant Dayton; 49 Robbie Erlin; 26 Mike Foltynewicz; 54 Max Fried; 19 Shane Greene; 32 Cole Hamels; 77 Luke Jackson; 55 Chris Martin; 68 Tyler Matzek; 36 Mark Melancon; 53 Tommy Milone; 33 A. J. Minter; 15 Sean Newcomb; 56 Darren O'Day; 52 Chris Rusin; 51 Will Smith; 61 Chad Sobotka; 40 Mike Soroka; 38 Josh Tomlin; 62 Touki Toussaint; 71 Jacob Webb; 65 Patrick Weigel; 46 Bryse Wilson; 30 Kyle Wright; 73 Huascar Ynoa	Catchers: 60 William Contreras; 16 Travis d'Arnaud; 25 Tyler Flowers; 12 Alex Jackson; Infielders: 18 Matt Adams; 1 Ozzie Albies; 17 Johan Camargo; 8 Charlie Culberson; 5 Freddie Freeman; 24 Adeiny Hechavarria; 27 Austin Riley; 18 Pablo Sandoval; 7 Dansby Swanson	Outfielders: 13 Ronald Acuña Jr.; 23 Adam Duvall; 11 Ender Inciarte; 22 Nick Markakis; 20 Marcell Ozuna; 14 Cristian Pache; 45 Scott Schebler	Manager: 43 Brian Snitker; Coaches: 59 José Castro (assistant hitting); 57 Sal Fasano (catching coach); 58 DeMarlo Hale (first base); 39 Rick Kranitz (pitching); 97 Jimmy Leo (bullpen catcher); 95 Bobby Magallanes (assistant); 98 Tomás Pérez (batting practice pitcher); 34 Marty Reed (bullpen); 28 Kevin Seitzer (hitting); 37 Ron Washington (third base); 4 Walt Weiss (bench); 99 José Yepez (bullpen catcher); 2 Eric Young (assistant)

== Player stats ==
=== Batting ===
Note: G = Games played; AB = At bats; R = Runs; H = Hits; 2B = Doubles; 3B = Triples; HR = Home runs; RBI = Runs batted in; SB = Stolen bases; BB = Walks; AVG = Batting average; SLG = Slugging average

Player	G	AB	R	H	2B	3B	HR	RBI	SB	BB	AVG	SLG
Dansby Swanson	60	237	49	65	15	0	10	35	5	22	.274	.464
Marcell Ozuna	60	228	38	77	14	0	18	56	0	38	.338	.636
Freddie Freeman	60	214	51	73	23	1	13	53	2	45	.341	.640
Adam Duvall	57	190	34	45	8	0	16	33	0	15	.237	.532
Austin Riley	51	188	24	45	7	1	8	27	0	16	.239	.415
Travis d'Arnaud	44	165	19	53	8	0	9	34	1	16	.321	.533
Ronald Acuña Jr.	46	160	46	40	11	0	14	29	8	38	.250	.581
Nick Markakis	37	130	15	33	15	0	1	15	0	10	.254	.392
Johan Camargo	35	120	16	24	8	0	4	9	0	6	.200	.367
Ozzie Albies	29	118	21	32	5	0	6	19	3	5	.271	.466
Ender Inciarte	46	116	17	22	2	1	1	10	4	12	.190	.250
Tyler Flowers	22	69	5	15	6	0	1	5	0	8	.217	.348
Adeiny Hechavarria	27	59	7	15	3	0	0	2	0	4	.254	.305
Matt Adams	16	49	4	9	2	0	2	9	0	2	.184	.347
William Contreras	4	10	0	4	1	0	0	1	0	0	.400	.500
Alex Jackson	5	7	0	2	1	0	0	0	0	0	.286	.429
Charlie Culberson	9	7	2	1	1	0	0	1	0	0	.143	.286
Cristian Pache	2	4	0	1	0	0	0	0	0	0	.250	.250
Pablo Sandoval	1	2	0	0	0	0	0	0	0	2	.000	.000
Scott Schebler	1	1	0	0	0	0	0	0	0	0	.000	.000
Team totals	60	2074	348	556	130	3	103	338	23	239	.268	.483

=== Pitching ===
Note: W = Wins; L = Losses; ERA = Earned run average; G = Games pitched; GS = Games started; SV = Saves; IP = Innings pitched; H = Hits allowed; R = Runs allowed; ER = Earned runs allowed; BB = Walks allowed; SO = Strikeouts

Player	W	L	ERA	G	GS	SV	IP	H	R	ER	BB	SO
Max Fried	7	0	2.25	11	11	0	56.0	42	14	14	19	50
Josh Tomlin	2	2	4.76	17	5	0	39.2	40	22	21	8	36
Kyle Wright	2	4	5.21	8	8	0	38.0	35	23	22	24	30
Ian Anderson	3	2	1.95	6	6	0	32.1	21	11	7	14	41
Tyler Matzek	4	3	2.79	21	0	0	29.0	23	9	9	10	43
Shane Greene	1	0	2.60	28	0	0	27.2	22	9	8	9	21
Grant Dayton	2	1	2.30	18	0	0	27.1	22	9	7	11	32
Luke Jackson	2	0	6.84	19	0	0	26.1	39	23	20	13	20
Touki Toussaint	0	2	8.88	7	5	0	24.1	27	28	24	16	30
Robbie Erlin	0	0	8.49	7	5	0	23.1	28	22	22	6	21
Mark Melancon	2	1	2.78	23	0	11	22.2	22	8	7	7	14
Huascar Ynoa	0	0	5.82	9	5	0	21.2	23	14	14	13	17
A. J. Minter	1	1	0.83	22	0	0	21.2	15	3	2	9	24
Chris Martin	1	1	1.00	19	0	1	18.0	8	3	2	3	20
Darren O'Day	4	0	1.10	19	0	0	16.1	8	3	2	5	22
Will Smith	2	2	4.50	18	0	0	16.0	11	8	8	4	18
Bryse Wilson	1	0	4.02	6	2	1	15.2	18	7	7	9	15
Michael Soroka	0	1	3.95	3	3	0	13.2	11	7	6	7	8
Sean Newcomb	0	2	11.20	4	4	0	13.2	20	17	17	6	10
Jacob Webb	0	0	0.00	8	0	0	10.0	7	2	0	5	10
Tommy Milone	0	0	14.90	3	3	0	9.2	22	16	16	2	9
Jhoulys Chacín	1	0	7.20	2	0	0	5.0	6	4	4	3	3
Chad Sobotka	0	0	12.27	4	0	0	3.2	6	5	5	2	2
Mike Foltynewicz	0	1	16.20	1	1	0	3.1	4	6	6	4	3
Cole Hamels	0	1	8.10	1	1	0	3.1	3	3	3	1	2
Chris Rusin	0	0	8.10	1	0	0	3.1	6	3	3	3	3
Tucker Davidson	0	1	10.80	1	1	0	1.2	3	7	2	4	2
Patrick Weigel	0	0	27.00	1	0	0	0.2	2	2	2	3	0
Charlie Culberson	0	0	0.00	1	0	0	0.1	0	0	0	0	0
Team totals	35	25	4.41	60	60	13	524.1	494	288	257	220	506

== Postseason ==
=== Game log ===
2020 postseason game log: 8–4 (Home: 5–2; Away: 3–2)
NLWCS: 2–0 (Home: 2–0; Away: 0–0)

#	Date	Opponent	Score	Win	Loss	Save	Record
1	September 30	Reds	1–0 (13)	Minter (1–0)	Bradley (0–1)	—	1–0
2	October 1	Reds	5–0	Anderson (1–0)	Castillo (0–1)	—	2–0

NLDS: 3–0 (Home: 2–0; Away: 1–0)

#	Date	Opponent	Score	Win	Loss	Save	Record
1	October 6	Marlins	9–5	Smith (1–0)	Alcántara (0–1)	—	1–0
2	October 7	Marlins	2–0	Anderson (1–0)	López (0–1)	Melancon (1)	2–0
3	October 8	@ Marlins	7–0	Wright (1–0)	Sánchez (0–1)	—	3–0
all games played at Minute Maid Park in Houston, Texas

NLCS: 3–4 (Home: 1–2; Away: 2–2)

#	Date	Opponent	Score	Win	Loss	Save	Attendance	Record
1	October 12	@ Dodgers	5–1	Smith (1–0)	Treinen (0–1)	—	10,700	1–0
2	October 13	@ Dodgers	8–7	Matzek (1–0)	Gonsolin (0–1)	Melancon (1)	10,624	2–0
3	October 14	Dodgers	3–15	Urías (1–0)	Wright (0–1)	—	10,664	2–1
4	October 15	Dodgers	10–2	Wilson (1–0)	Kershaw (0–1)	—	11,044	3–1
5	October 16	Dodgers	3–7	Treinen (1–1)	Smith (1–1)	—	11,119	3–2
6	October 17	@ Dodgers	1–3	Buehler (1–0)	Fried (0–1)	Jansen (1)	10,772	3–3
7	October 18	@ Dodgers	3–4	Urías (2–0)	Martin (0–1)	—	10,920	3–4
all games played at Globe Life Field in Arlington, Texas

=== Postseason rosters ===
Playoff rosters
National League Wild Card Series

- Pitchers: 19 Shane Greene 30 Kyle Wright 33 A. J. Minter 36 Mark Melancon 38 Josh Tomlin 48 Ian Anderson 51 Will Smith 54 Max Fried 55 Chris Martin 56 Darren O'Day 68 Tyler Matzek 71 Jacob Webb 75 Grant Dayton
- Catchers: 16 Travis d'Arnaud 25 Tyler Flowers 60 William Contreras
- Infielders: 1 Ozzie Albies 5 Freddie Freeman 7 Dansby Swanson 8 Charlie Culberson 17 Johan Camargo 18 Pablo Sandoval 27 Austin Riley
- Outfielders: 13 Ronald Acuña Jr. 14 Cristian Pache 22 Nick Markakis 23 Adam Duvall
- Designated hitters: 20 Marcell Ozuna

National League Division Series

- Pitchers: 19 Shane Greene 30 Kyle Wright 33 A. J. Minter 36 Mark Melancon 38 Josh Tomlin 46 Bryse Wilson 48 Ian Anderson 51 Will Smith 54 Max Fried 55 Chris Martin 56 Darren O'Day 68 Tyler Matzek 71 Jacob Webb 73 Huascar Ynoa 75 Grant Dayton
- Catchers: 16 Travis d'Arnaud 25 Tyler Flowers
- Infielders: 1 Ozzie Albies 5 Freddie Freeman 7 Dansby Swanson 8 Charlie Culberson 18 Pablo Sandoval 27 Austin Riley
- Outfielders: 13 Ronald Acuña Jr. 14 Cristian Pache 22 Nick Markakis 23 Adam Duvall
- Designated hitters: 20 Marcell Ozuna

National League Championship Series

- Pitchers: 19 Shane Greene 30 Kyle Wright 33 A. J. Minter 36 Mark Melancon 38 Josh Tomlin 46 Bryse Wilson 48 Ian Anderson 51 Will Smith 54 Max Fried 55 Chris Martin 56 Darren O'Day 68 Tyler Matzek 71 Jacob Webb 73 Huascar Ynoa 75 Grant Dayton
- Catchers: 16 Travis d'Arnaud 25 Tyler Flowers
- Infielders: 1 Ozzie Albies 5 Freddie Freeman 7 Dansby Swanson 8 Charlie Culberson 17 Johan Camargo (Games 2–7) 18 Pablo Sandoval 27 Austin Riley
- Outfielders: 13 Ronald Acuña Jr. 14 Cristian Pache 22 Nick Markakis 23 Adam Duvall (Game 1)
- Designated hitters: 20 Marcell Ozuna

== Farm system ==
Level	Team	League	Manager
AAA	Gwinnett Stripers	International League	
AA	Mississippi Braves	Southern League	
A-Advanced	Florida Fire Frogs	Florida State League	
A	Rome Braves	South Atlantic League	
Rookie	Danville Braves	Appalachian League	
Rookie	GCL Braves	Gulf Coast League	
Rookie	DSL Braves	Dominican Summer League	
