= Ranger Suárez =

Venezuelan baseball player (born 1995)

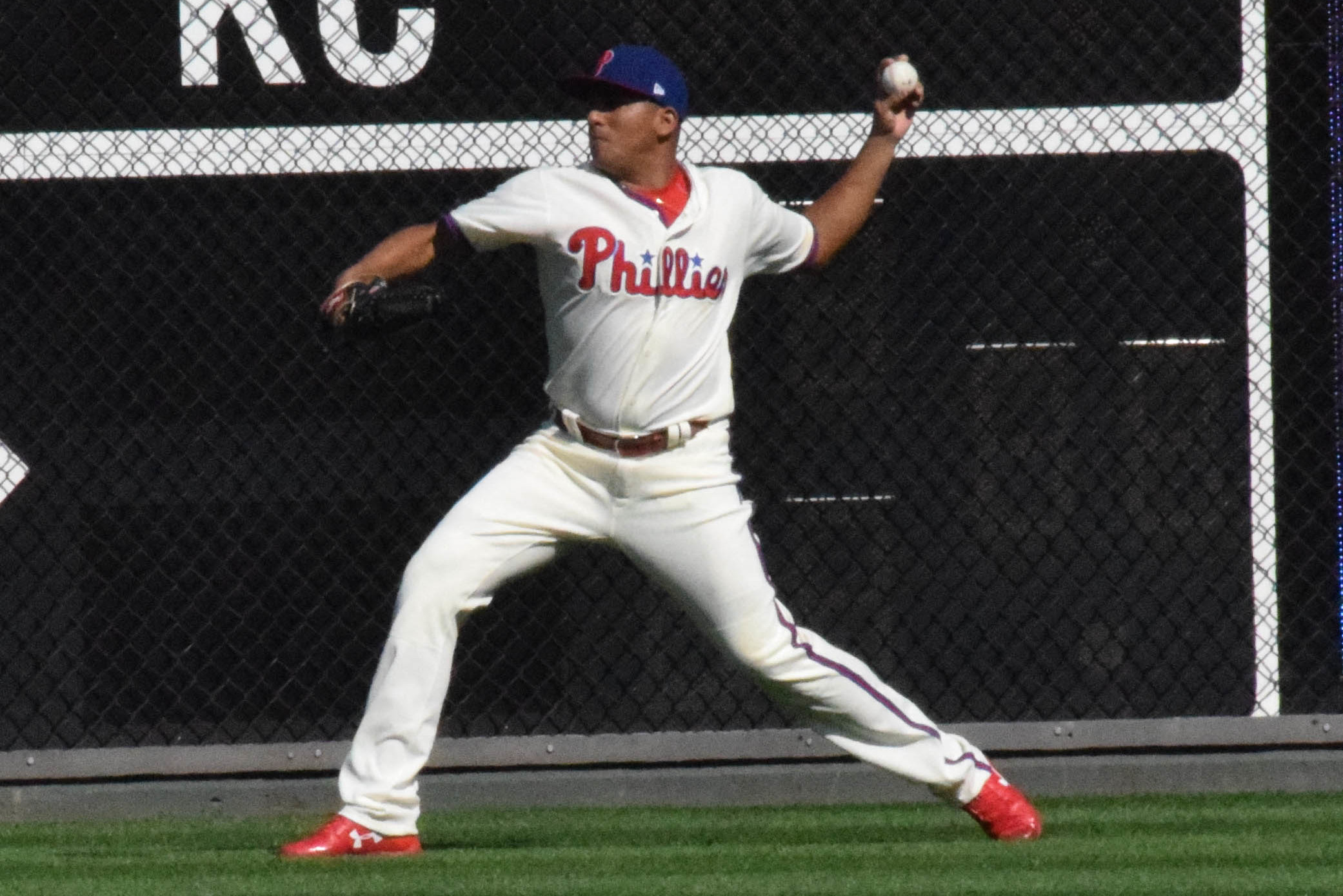
- Suárez with the Philadelphia Phillies in 2018

Boston Red Sox – No. 55
- Pitcher
- Born: August 26, 1995 (age 31); Pies de Cuesta, Venezuela
- Bats: Left Throws: Left

MLB debut
- July 26, 2018, for the Philadelphia Phillies

MLB statistics (through 2026 season)
- Win–loss record: 61–42
- Earned run average: 3.35
- Strikeouts: 845
- Stats at Baseball Reference

Teams
- Philadelphia Phillies (2018–2025); Boston Red Sox (2026–present)

Career highlights and awards
- 2× All-Star (2024, 2026)
Medals
Men's baseball
Representing Venezuela
World Baseball Classic
Gold medal – first place	2026 Miami	Team

Ranger José Suárez Gomez (born August 26, 1995) is a Venezuelan professional baseball pitcher for the Boston Red Sox of Major League Baseball (MLB). He has previously played in MLB for the Philadelphia Phillies.

The Phillies signed Suárez, a native of Pies de Cuesta, as an international free agent in 2012. His first season in the Venezuelan Summer League (VSL) was cut short by a drug suspension, but he returned to pitch in the VSL for two more seasons. In 2014, after giving up only one walk for the duration of the season, he began to attract the attention of the Phillies organization, and he was moved to the Rookie League the following year. Suárez's stock continued to rise in 2016 when he pitched a no-hitter with the Williamsport Crosscutters. In 2017 and 2018, he continued to rise through the Phillies' farm system, spending time in Double-A and Triple-A as a starting pitcher with a high strikeout rate.

Suárez made his major league debut in 2018 when the Phillies needed an additional starting pitcher. He returned to Triple-A at the start of the 2019 season but was a mainstay within the Phillies by the end of June. He was used as a relief pitcher for most of his appearances that season, but was in contention for a role in the starting rotation in 2020. Suárez ultimately missed most of the shortened season after contracting COVID-19 during training camp. He returned to the team in 2021 as a long reliever, pitching a stretch of successful middle innings in a depth-challenged roster, before joining the starting rotation at the trading deadline. Suárez served as the third starter during the 2022 Phillies season and was a key factor in the team winning the National League pennant. Suárez is a two-time All-Star.

== Early life ==
Suárez was born in Pie de Cuesta, Venezuela. His father, Ricardo, worked as a farmer, while Suárez spent his childhood playing baseball and soccer. He spent most of his time in the outfield, but began pitching at the age of 15.

== Baseball career ==
=== Philadelphia Phillies ===
==== Minor leagues ====
The Philadelphia Phillies of Major League Baseball (MLB) signed Suárez as an international free agent in 2012 for a signing bonus of $25,000 USD. He was sixteen years old when he made his professional baseball debut for the Venezuelan Summer League (VSL) Phillies, pitching in three games as the team's closer. In five innings pitched, Suárez recorded four strikeouts and recorded two saves. Suárez' season came to an abrupt end in July after he was found in violation of the Minor League Baseball (MiLB) drug program. Suárez and fellow pitcher Daniel Cordero tested positive for the anabolic steroid Stanozolol, and were both suspended for 50 games. He returned to the VSL the following year, posting a 3.18 earned run average with eight runs allowed and 13 strikeouts in 17 innings. Suárez started to attract attention within the Phillies organization in 2014, when he gave up only one walk in 80 2/3 innings for the VSL Phillies. He posted a 5–4 win–loss record that season, with a 1.56 ERA and 78 strikeouts, while leading the VSL in both innings pitched (80 2/3) and strikeouts (78).

By 2015, Suárez had been assigned to the Rookie League GCL Phillies. He pitched in only six games that season in the Gulf Coast League, as a left elbow strain cut his season short. In the 27 2/3 innings that he did pitch, Suárez posted a 3–0 record and a 0.65 ERA with 20 strikeouts and only four walks allowed. The next year, he was assigned to the Low-A Williamsport Crosscutters of the New York–Penn League (NYPL). On July 26, in the first game of a doubleheader against the Auburn Doubledays, Suárez pitched a seven-inning no-hitter and took Williamsport to a 4–0 victory. For the feat, he was named both the Phillies Minor League and the NYPL Pitcher of the Week for the week spanning July 25 to 31. Suárez finished the season with a 6–4 record and a 2.81 ERA, striking out 53 batters in 73 2/3 innings. That September, he was honored with the Rankin Johnson Pitcher of the Year Award, given to the Crosscutters' top pitcher of the season as decided by teammates and coaches.

Suárez began the 2017 season with the Single-A Lakewood BlueClaws. He had a strong start to the year, giving up only two runs in his first four starts and reaching a streak of 24 shutout innings. For his efforts, the Phillies named Suárez their Minor League Pitcher of the Month for April 2017. On June 27, he carried a perfect game into the eighth inning before giving up a single to Jarett Rindfleisch of the Greensboro Grasshoppers. Suárez was named to the South Atlantic League All-Star team, but Jordan Jess replaced him on the roster. This was because before the game, on July 4, Suárez was promoted to the High-A Clearwater Threshers. He joined a rotation of top pitching prospects that also included JoJo Romero, Sixto Sanchez, and Franklyn Kilome. Between both minor league teams, Suárez posted an 8–6 record in 2017, with a 2.27 ERA and 128 strikeouts in 122 2/3 innings. At the end of the season, the Phillies added Suárez and three other pitching prospects to the 40-man roster, in order to protect them from the Rule 5 draft.

In 2018, Suárez was assigned to the Double-A Reading Fightin Phils as part of a starting rotation that also included Romero, Kilome, and Seranthony Dominguez. He was named the Eastern League Pitcher of the Week twice with Reading, once in April and once in June. At the end of June, he was promoted to the Triple-A Lehigh Valley IronPigs, where, after a difficult first start, he accumulated 65 strikeouts in 14 games. Between Reading and Lehigh, Suárez posted a 6–3 record in 2018, with a 2.75 ERA and 85 strikeouts in 21 games and 124 1/3 innings.

==== Major leagues ====
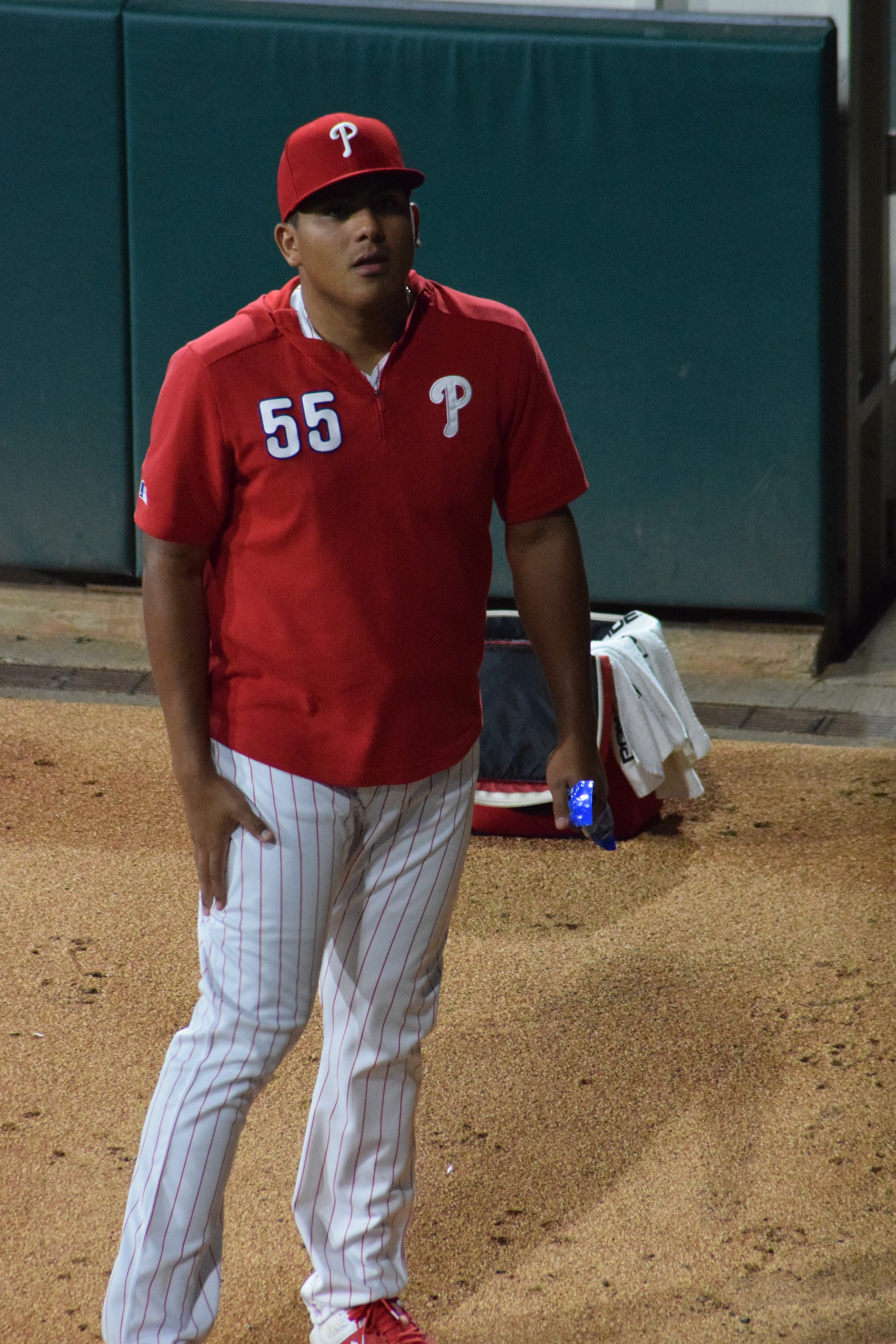
Suarez in 2019

After a rain delay forced a doubleheader against the San Diego Padres, the Phillies needed an extra man in their starting rotation, and Suárez was called up to the major leagues on July 24, 2018. He debuted on July 26, allowing six hits and four runs in five innings, including a pair of two-run home runs from Eugenio Suárez and Tucker Barnhart. Suárez came away with the win, however, as the Phillies hit seven home runs for a 9–4 victory. He was the first left-handed starter to pitch for the Phillies since Adam Morgan in 2016. Suárez played four games with the Phillies in 2018, starting three, and posted a 1–1 record with a 5.40 ERA and 11 strikeouts in 15 innings.

Suárez returned to Lehigh in 2019 as MLB.com's No. 10 prospect in the Phillies organization. After two brief major-league call-ups in June, he received a final promotion to the Phillies on June 20. That July, he became the first Phillies pitcher since Michael Stutes in 2011 to record wins in three consecutive appearances. Despite playing 82 of his 94 minor league games as a starting pitcher, Suárez became a staple of the Phillies' bullpen as a left-handed reliever alongside Morgan and José Álvarez. He made 37 relief appearances for the Phillies in 2019, finishing eight games for them. Suárez posted a 6–1 record and a 3.14 ERA, with 42 strikeouts in 48 2/3 innings.

After his successful 2019 season, Suárez was expected to be a strong candidate for a position in the Phillies' 2020 starting rotation. His upward trajectory, however, came to a halt shortly before opening day, when he tested positive for the COVID-19 virus. After spending four weeks quarantining in a hotel room in Clearwater, Florida, Suárez rejoined the roster for the final part of the season, which was shortened to 60 games due to the impacts of the pandemic. He began rehab assignments in Lehigh Valley in late August before being placed into a bullpen with recent acquisitions Brandon Workman, Heath Hembree, and David Hale. In only four innings with the Phillies, Suárez posted an ERA of 20.25, surrendering 10 hits and nine earned runs, including one home run, while striking out only one batter.

Once again, Suárez opened the 2021 season with Lehigh. He returned to the Phillies on May 27, called in to relieve Spencer Howard in the fifth inning of a game against the Miami Marlins. He took over on the mound with the bases loaded, and proceeded to pitch three shutout innings in what ultimately became a 3–2 win for the Phillies. The following week, on June 5, Suárez was once again called to relieve Howard, whose pitch velocity fell by 6 mph (9.7 km/h) between the first and third inning. After the 5–2 victory over the Washington Nationals, Phillies manager Joe Girardi told reporters that he intended to combine Howard and Suárez in future games. His role had shifted by July: Héctor Neris was removed as the Phillies' closer in June after four blown saves and an 8.22 ERA for the month, and José Alvarado lost the position when he walked 27 batters in 31 innings. Suárez was asked to close a 4–2 win over the San Diego Padres on July 3, picking up his first career save. He blew his first save two weeks later, giving up a two-run home run to Jesús Aguilar in the ninth inning of a game against the Miami Marlins, forcing the game into extra innings. At the MLB trading deadline, the Phillies acquired closer Ian Kennedy from the Texas Rangers; Suárez, in turn, was promoted to the starting rotation. Suárez threw his first career complete game, a 97 pitch four-hit 3–0 shutout or Maddux against the Pittsburgh Pirates on September 25, 2021.

He pitched in 39 games for the Phillies in 2021, starting 12 and finishing 13, and posted an 8–5 record with a 1.36 ERA and 107 strikeouts in 106 innings. He held opposing left-handed batters to a .109 batting average and .129 slugging percentage, the lowest of all major league pitchers.

==== 2022 ====
In 2022, he was 10–7 with a 3.65 ERA in 29 starts over 155.1 innings. He held opposing left-handed batters to a .197 batting average and .303 slugging percentage.

In game five of the 2022 National League Championship Series, Suárez helped to clinch the series win over the San Diego Padres. Suárez entered the game at the top of the ninth inning to replace David Robertson, who managed to strike out his first batter and issued two walks afterwards. Suárez's first pitch was bunted by Trent Grisham to which Suárez fielded to throw out Grisham, allowing the runners to advance to second and third base. With two outs, Suárez faced Austin Nola, who hit a fly ball on the first pitch thrown and was caught by Nick Castellanos, claiming a 4–3 victory over the Padres.

==== 2023 ====
On January 13, 2023, Suárez agreed to a one-year, $2.95 million contract with the Phillies for the 2023 season, avoiding salary arbitration.

In the 2023 regular season, Suárez had a record of 4–6 with a 4.18 ERA over 22 starts and 125 innings pitched with 119 strikeouts.

In the 2023 National League Division Series against the Atlanta Braves, Suárez would start in both Games 1 and 4, in both games matching up with Braves pitcher Spencer Strider. In Game 1, he pitched 3.2 innings, only giving up 1 hit and recording 4 strikeouts. In Game 4, Suárez recorded a victory, pitching 5 innings and giving up only 1 earned run in a 3–1 series-clinching victory.

==== 2024 ====
Suárez was named the National League Pitcher of the Month for March/April 2024. During that period, Suárez won all six of his starts with a 0.63 WHIP, a 1.32 ERA in 41 innings pitched, and a complete game shutout against the Colorado Rockies. Suárez was then elected to make his first All-Star appearance, but backed out due to back soreness.

In the 2024 regular season, Suárez had a record of 12–8 with a 3.46 ERA over 27 starts and 150.2 innings pitched with 145 strikeouts.

==== 2025 ====
In the 2025 regular season, Suárez had a record of 12–8 with a 3.20 ERA over 26 starts and 157 1/3 innings pitched with 151 strikeouts.

In the 2025 National League Division Series against the Los Angeles Dodgers, Suárez played as a relief pitcher in Game 3, matching up with Dodgers pitcher Yoshinobu Yamamoto. In the game, he pitched 5 innings, only giving up one hit and one run while recording 4 strikeouts in an 8–2 victory. After the postseason, Suárez became a free agent.

=== Boston Red Sox ===
On January 21, 2026, Suárez signed a five-year, $130 million contract with the Boston Red Sox. Suárez was selected to the 2026 MLB All-Star Game in his first season on the team after recording a 2.94 ERA over 16 starts.

== Pitcher profile ==
Suárez spent most of his professional baseball career as a starting pitcher before alternating through the bullpen in many roles such as a long reliever, set-up man, and closer by the Phillies from 2019 to 2021. In the late 2021 season, however, the Phillies moved Suárez to the starting pitching rotation due to a lack of depth and injuries in their rotation. Suárez' pitch repertoire varies based on how he is being used: as a starting pitcher, he prefers to use a slider, while, as a reliever, he utilizes a combination of a sinker and a changeup. Suárez' fastball averages 93 mph (150 km/h) and contributes to a high strikeout rate.

== Personal life ==
Suárez met his wife, Joseany Cabello, when they were children in Pie de Cuesta, and they were married during the 2023–24 MLB offseason. They have two children together. Suárez is the first MLB player to be named "Ranger". While he was playing in the minor leagues, some of his teammates nicknamed him the "red Power Ranger". Suárez has two brothers named Raymer and Rosmer and a sister named Rangerlin. He told reporters that it is a family tradition to give every child a name beginning with the letter "R".

== See also ==
- List of Major League Baseball players from Venezuela
