= Ryan Ellis (baseball) =

- Infielder / Coach
- Born: July 19, 1978 (age 47); Pittsburgh, Pennsylvania
- Bats: Right Throws: Right

Teams
- New York Mets (2020)

Ryan D. Ellis (born July 19, 1978) is an American professional baseball coach. He was the hitting performance coordinator for the New York Mets of Major League Baseball (MLB).

== Career ==
Ellis, an infielder, was selected by the Montreal Expos in the 28th round of the 2000 Major League Baseball draft from Point Park College. He played two seasons with the Vermont Expos before leaving affiliated ball to play three seasons with the Washington Wild Things of the Frontier League. During the 2003 and 2004 seasons, he served as a player-coach and stayed on as a full-time coach in the 2005 season after retiring as a player. In 2006, he joined the Norfolk Tides mid-season in the role of first base coach. He then coached for the Binghamton Mets in 2007, Kingsport Mets in 2008, and Savannah Sand Gnats in 2009 and 2010. In 2011, he was named the manager of the Sand Gnats and led the team to a 79–60 record. From 2012 to 2014, he was the manager of the St. Lucie Mets; he was named the Florida State League Manager of the Year in 2012. In 2015, Ellis was named the Mets organization's minor league hitting coordinator. In 2020, he served as the Mets' major league hitting performance coordinator under assistant hitting coach Tom Slater, and worked in-person with the team during the 2020 season. After reports of sexual harassment, Ellis was fired by the Mets on January 22, 2021.
