= Chris Reed (baseball) =

Anglo-American baseball player (born 1990)

- Pitcher
- Born: May 20, 1990 (age 35); London, England, United Kingdom
- Batted: Left Threw: Left

MLB debut
- August 1, 2015, for the Miami Marlins

Last MLB appearance
- August 3, 2015, for the Miami Marlins

MLB statistics
- Win–loss record: 0–0
- Earned run average: 4.50
- Strikeouts: 1
- Stats at Baseball Reference

Teams
- Miami Marlins (2015)

Christopher William Reed (born May 20, 1990) is an English born former professional baseball pitcher. He played in two games in Major League Baseball (MLB) for the Miami Marlins in 2015. Reed has also represented Great Britain internationally.

== Early life ==
Reed was born in London and spent the first year of his life in England where his father was working. The family thereafter relocated to Southern California.

== Career ==
=== Amateur career ===
Reed attended Cleveland High School in Reseda, California. In his senior year, in 2008, Reed was a second-team all-West Valley League selection. He played college baseball at Stanford and was the closer for the Cardinal in 2011, picking up 9 saves and a 6–2 record, with a 2.54 ERA in 28 games. He limited opposing batters to a .201 average with 48 strikeouts.

=== Los Angeles Dodgers ===
The Los Angeles Dodgers selected Reed in the first round of the 2011 MLB draft. He signed late in the summer, agreeing to a $1.6 million signing bonus, and only appeared in 3 games for the Rancho Cucamonga Quakes during the 2011 season, pitching only seven innings. After beginning 2012 with the Quakes, he was promoted in June to the AA Chattanooga Lookouts.

Reed was selected to represent the "World Team" in the 2012 All-Star Futures Game and represented the Great Britain national baseball team in the qualifying rounds of the 2013 World Baseball Classic. The Dodgers assigned him to the Mesa Solar Sox in the Arizona Fall League. In 2013, he spent the entire season with the Lookouts and was 4–11 with a 3.86 ERA in 29 appearances (25 starts). In 2014, he was selected to the mid-season Southern League All-Star Game. He was promoted to the AAA Albuquerque Isotopes on August 7, 2014. He made five starts for the Isotopes, and was 0–3 with a 10.97 ERA.

On November 20, 2014, he was added to the Dodgers 40 man roster in order to protect him from the Rule 5 Draft. He was assigned to the AA Tulsa Drillers to start the season, and also moved into the bullpen after having previously been a starter. Reed was promoted to Triple-A on April 29, 2015. The Dodgers designated him for assignment on July 10, and removed him from the 40-man roster.

=== Miami Marlins ===
Reed was traded by the Dodgers to the Miami Marlins on July 15, 2015, for Grant Dayton. He was assigned to the AAA New Orleans Zephyrs but the Marlins called him up to the majors for the first time on August 1. He pitched two scoreless innings of relief in his debut that night against the San Diego Padres. He later allowed two runs in two innings against the New York Mets on August 3 before returning to the Minors.

He announced his retirement on February 17, 2017. On April 20, 2018, he came out of retirement to re-sign with the Marlins and was assigned to the Greensboro Grasshoppers. He was later promoted to Double A Jacksonville Jumbo Shrimp and pitched out of the bullpen.

=== New Britain Bees ===
On July 14, 2018, Reed signed with the New Britain Bees of the Atlantic League. He became a free agent following the 2018 season. In 21 games (1 start) 23 innings he went 0-3 with a 3.91 ERA with 29 strikeouts.

Reed later re-signed with the Bees on July 12, 2019. He became a free agent following the season. In 15 games 22.1 innings of relief he went 2-0 with a 4.84 ERA with more walks (19) than strikeouts (13).

=== Long Island Ducks ===
On May 7, 2021, Reed signed with the Long Island Ducks of the Atlantic League of Professional Baseball. In 23 bullpen appearances, he registered a 1–2 record with a 7.98 ERA and 13 strikeouts. On August 24, 2021, Reed announced his retirement from professional baseball.

== International career ==
Reed was selected to represent Great Britain at the 2023 World Baseball Classic qualification.
