= Grant Dayton =

American baseball player (born 1987)

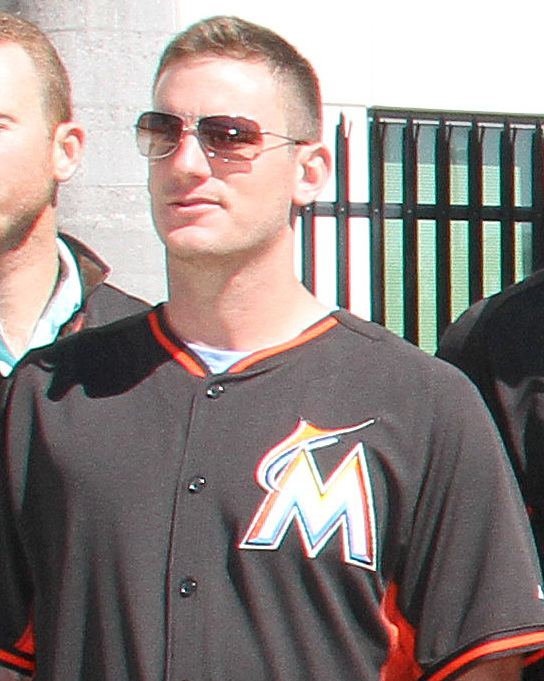
- Dayton with the Miami Marlins in 2015
- Pitcher
- Born: November 25, 1987 (age 38); Huntsville, Alabama, U.S.
- Batted: Left Threw: Left

MLB debut
- July 22, 2016, for the Los Angeles Dodgers

Last MLB appearance
- June 4, 2021, for the Atlanta Braves

MLB statistics
- Win–loss record: 3–4
- Earned run average: 3.43
- Strikeouts: 119
- Stats at Baseball Reference

Teams
- Los Angeles Dodgers (2016–2017); Atlanta Braves (2019–2021)

Grant Arthur Dayton (born November 25, 1987) is an American former professional baseball pitcher. He played in Major League Baseball (MLB) for the Los Angeles Dodgers and Atlanta Braves.

Dayton was drafted by the Florida Marlins in the 11th round of the 2010 MLB draft out of Auburn University. He was traded to the Dodgers in 2015 in exchange for Chris Reed, and made his MLB debut for them in 2016. He was claimed off waivers by the Braves in 2017.

== Amateur career ==
Dayton attended Bob Jones High School in Madison, Alabama. He pitched two no-hitters in high school, in 2005 and 2006 and as a senior was 7–3 with a 2.39 ERA and struck out 115, earning him first-team all-state honors.

He went on to Auburn University, where he pursued and graduated with a Bachelor of Science degree in Industrial and Systems Engineering in 2011. As a redshirt freshman for the Auburn Tigers he was 7–2 with a 3.89 ERA and became the staff ace. He was named a Freshman All-American by Collegiate Baseball. As a sophomore, he was 2–6 with a 5.92 ERA in 13 starts and led the team in strikeouts with 69. In 2010, he was 8–3 with a 4.36 ERA as a junior and led Auburn into the NCAA Regionals.

== Professional career ==
=== Florida / Miami Marlins ===
Dayton was drafted by the Florida Marlins in the 11th round, with the 347th overall selection, of the 2010 Major League Baseball draft. After one game with the Gulf Coast Marlins, he was assigned to the Jamestown Jammers of the New York–Penn League, where he was 1–1 with a 1.88 ERA in 17 appearances. In 2011 with the Greensboro Grasshoppers of the South Atlantic League, he appeared in 49 games with a 3.15 ERA and a 7–1 record. In 2012, he began the season with the Jupiter Hammerheads of the Florida State League where he was 2–5 with a 2.85 ERA in 31 appearances (including six starts) with 71 strikeouts. He credited his success that season to pitching coach Joe Coleman, and on August 13 he was promoted to the Double-A Jacksonville Suns of the Southern League. He appeared in seven games for the Suns at the end of the season and then played for the Phoenix Desert Dogs of the Arizona Fall League.

Dayton received an invitation to major league spring training with the Marlins in 2013 but suffered a stress fracture in his pitching elbow and underwent surgery in February which kept him out of action until May 20. He was 4–4 with a 2.37 ERA in 30 games for the Suns that season.

Dayton was added to the Marlins' 40-man roster after the 2013 season, in order to be protected from the Rule 5 draft. He split the 2014 season between the Suns and the Triple-A New Orleans Zephyrs of the Pacific Coast League. In 50 games he had a 3.12 ERA and a 2–3 record and 79 strikeouts. Dayton was designated for assignment by the Marlins on April 24, 2015, but remained in the organization and pitched in 25 games for New Orleans, with a 2–1 record and 2.83 ERA.

=== Los Angeles Dodgers ===
Dayton was traded by the Marlins to the Los Angeles Dodgers on July 15, 2015, in exchange for former first-round pick Chris Reed. The Dodgers assigned him to the Triple-A Oklahoma City Dodgers. He struggled with Oklahoma City (9.26 ERA in nine games) and was demoted to Double-A Tulsa Drillers of the Texas League where he had a 2.53 ERA in eight games.

Dayton had his contract purchased by the Dodgers and he was called up to the major leagues on July 21, 2016. He made his major league debut the following day against the St. Louis Cardinals by pitching two scoreless innings of relief in extra innings. In 25 games, he pitched 26 1/3 innings with a 2.05 ERA. He pitched in four games of the 2016 National League Division Series, allowing three earned runs in 1 2/3 innings and pitched another 1 2/3 innings over three games in the 2016 National League Championship Series, allowing no earned runs.

Dayton picked up his first major league win on April 29, 2017, when he worked a scoreless ninth inning against the Philadelphia Phillies. He pitched in 29 games for the Dodgers with a 1–1 record and 4.94 ERA. While rehabbing in the minors from a stint on the disabled list, he felt something in his elbow. After examination, it was determined that he would need to undergo Tommy John surgery, ending his 2017 season.

=== Atlanta Braves ===
Dayton was claimed off waivers by the Atlanta Braves on November 20, 2017.

Dayton returned to the major leagues on April 29, 2019, following his recovery from Tommy John surgery, and after he had pitched for the Gwinnett Stripers. Overall, Dayton appeared in 14 games at the major league level in 2019, compiling a 3.00 ERA and a 0–1 win–loss record in 12 innings in which he had 14 strikeouts.

Dayton started 2020 in major league spring training with the Braves but was shut down in March because of the COVID-19 pandemic. When preparations began for a resumed shortened season in late June, it was announced that Dayton would be among the Braves’ pool of 60 players eligible to participate in the regular season, either with the major league team or the taxi squad. When the shortened season resumed, Dayton was 2–1 with a 2.30 ERA and 32 strikeouts in 27 1/3 innings over 18 relief appearances.

On June 5, 2021, Dayton was placed on the injured list with left shoulder inflammation and was later transferred to the 60-day injured list on July 7. The Braves finished with an 88–73 record, clinching the NL East, and eventually won the 2021 World Series, giving the Braves their first title since 1995. On November 6, the Braves released Dayton.

=== Miami Marlins (second stint) ===
On November 22, 2021, Dayton signed a minor league contract with the Miami Marlins. He made 12 appearances for the Triple-A Jacksonville Jumbo Shrimp in 2022, posting an 0-1 record and 2.35 ERA with 24 strikeouts and one save across 15 1/3 innings pitched. Dayton was released by the Marlins organization on May 14, 2022.

=== Los Angeles Angels ===
On May 22, 2022, Dayton signed a minor league deal with the Los Angeles Angels organization. In 34 games for the Triple–A Salt Lake Bees, he registered a 5.56 ERA with 33 strikeouts in 34 innings of work. Dayton elected free agency following the season on November 10.

On July 28, 2023, Dayton announced his retirement from professional baseball via Twitter, and that he had become a health insurance agent.

== Personal life ==
Grant is married to Cori Dayton. Grant is also color blind.
