= Franklyn Kilome =

Dominican baseball player (born 1995)

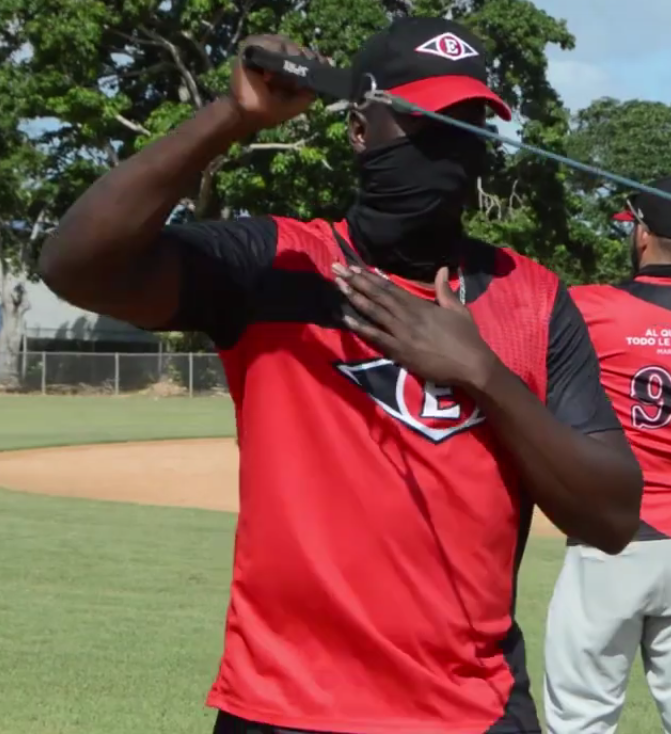
- Kilome with Leones del Escogido in 2020

Guelph Royals
- Pitcher
- Born: June 25, 1995 (age 31); La Romana, Dominican Republic
- Bats: Right Throws: Right

MLB debut
- August 1, 2020, for the New York Mets

MLB statistics (through 2020 season)
- Win–loss record: 0–1
- Earned run average: 11.12
- Strikeouts: 13
- Stats at Baseball Reference

Teams
- New York Mets (2020)

Franklyn Kilome (born June 25, 1995) is a Dominican professional baseball pitcher for the Guelph Royals of the Canadian Baseball League. He has previously played in Major League Baseball (MLB) for the New York Mets.

== Professional career ==
=== Philadelphia Phillies ===
Kilomé signed with the Philadelphia Phillies as an international free agent in 2013. He made his professional debut in 2014 with the Gulf Coast Phillies where he posted a 3.12 ERA in 40 innings pitched. He pitched in 2015 for the Williamsport Crosscutters where he posted a 3–2 record with a 3.28 ERA in 11 starts. Kilomé spent 2016 with the Lakewood BlueClaws, pitching to a 5–8 record and 3.85 ERA. in 23 games started. Kilomé began 2017 with the Clearwater Threshers, and after posting a 6–4 record and a 2.59 ERA in 19 starts, was promoted to the Reading Fightin Phils where he finished the season, going 1–3 with a 3.64 ERA in five starts. The Phillies added Kilomé to their 40-man roster after the 2017 season. He began 2018 with Reading.

=== New York Mets ===
On July 27, 2018, Kilomé was traded to the New York Mets in exchange for Asdrúbal Cabrera. He was assigned to the Binghamton Rumble Ponies and finished the season there. In 26 combined starts between Reading and Binghamton, he was 4–9 with a 4.18 ERA. On October 25, 2018, it was announced that Kilomé would undergo Tommy John surgery and would miss the entire 2019 season.

He made his major league debut on August 1, 2020. In relief, he got through four innings while allowing two earned runs and striking out five.

On April 10, 2021, Kilomé was designated for assignment by the Mets after José Peraza was added to the roster. On April 16, Kilomé was outrighted to the alternate training site.

=== Washington Nationals ===
On April 25, 2022, Kilomé signed a minor league contract with the Washington Nationals organization and was assigned to the rookie-level Florida Complex League Nationals. He split the year between the Double-A Harrisburg Senators and Triple-A Rochester Red Wings, posting a cumulative 5–11 record and 5.52 ERA with 99 strikeouts in 93.0 innings pitched across 20 games (19 starts).

Kilome began the 2023 season with Triple-A Rochester. In 3 games (2 starts), he struggled to a 19.64 ERA and 1–2 record with 2 strikeouts in 3.2 innings of work. He was released by the Nationals on April 25, 2023.

=== Ibaraki AstroPlanets ===
On June 23, 2023, Kilome signed with the Ibaraki AstroPlanets of Japan's independent Baseball Challenge League. On August 1, Ibaraki announced Kilome's departure from the team.

=== Lake Country DockHounds ===
On August 4, 2023, Kilome signed with the Lake Country DockHounds of the American Association of Professional Baseball. In 6 starts, he struggled to an 8.38 WEA with 29 strikeouts across 29 innings pitched. Kilome became a free agent at the end of the 2023 season.

=== Pericos de Puebla ===
On June 11, 2024, Kilome signed with the Pericos de Puebla of the Mexican League. In five games for Puebla, he struggled to a 10.13 ERA with one strikeout across 5 1/3 innings of work. Kilome was released by the Pericos on June 25.

On December 26, 2024, Kilome signed with the Conspiradores de Querétaro of the Mexican League. He was released prior to the start of the season on April 15, 2025.

=== Tecolotes de los Dos Laredos ===
On June 18, 2026, Kilome signed with the Tecolotes de los Dos Laredos of the Mexican League. Kilome made 14 appearances for the Tecolotes, recording an 0–1 record and 7.20 ERA with 14 strikeouts over 15 innings of work.

=== Guelph Royals ===
On July 27, 2026, Kilome signed with the Guelph Royals of the Canadian Baseball League.
