= Thomas Eshelman =

American baseball player (born 1994)

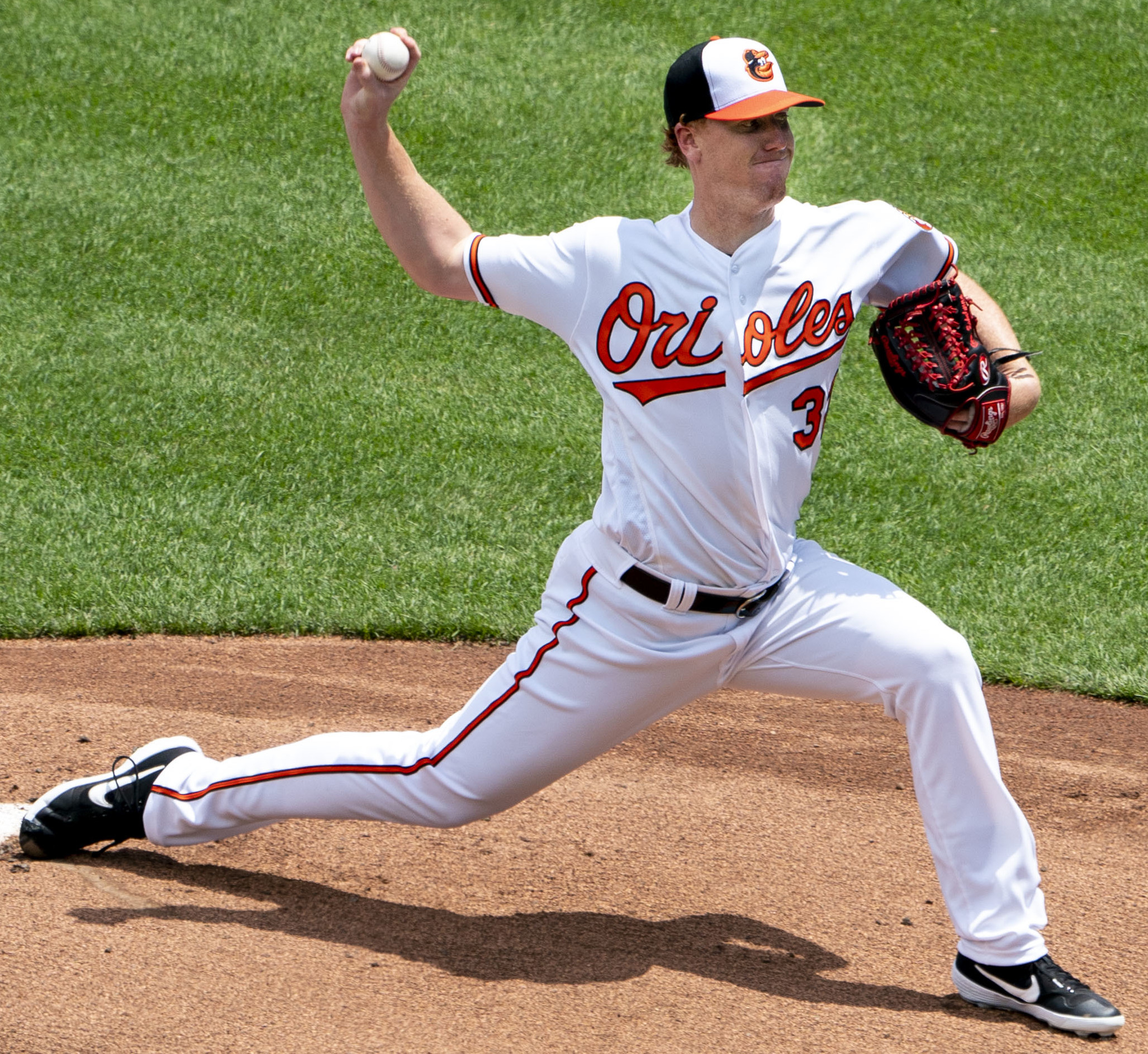
- Eshelman with the Baltimore Orioles in 2019

TCU Horned Frogs
- Pitcher / Coach
- Born: June 20, 1994 (age 32); Carlsbad, California, U.S.
- Batted: Right Threw: Right

MLB debut
- July 1, 2019, for the Baltimore Orioles

Last MLB appearance
- October 1, 2021, for the Baltimore Orioles

MLB statistics
- Win–loss record: 4–6
- Earned run average: 5.77
- Strikeouts: 49
- Stats at Baseball Reference

Teams
- Baltimore Orioles (2019–2021)

Thomas Darwin Eshelman (born June 20, 1994) is an American former professional baseball pitcher and current pitching coach for the TCU Horned Frogs. He made his Major League Baseball (MLB) debut with the Baltimore Orioles in 2019. He played college baseball for the Titans of CSU Fullerton. The Houston Astros selected Eshelman in the 2015 MLB draft, and traded him to the Philadelphia Phillies after the 2015 season. He was traded to the Orioles during the 2019 season.

== Amateur career ==
Eshelman attended Carlsbad High School in Carlsbad, California. He played as a pitcher and catcher for Carlsbad's baseball team. He was named to the California Interscholastic Federation's first team at the end of his senior season. However, he was not selected in the 2012 Major League Baseball draft.

Eshelman enrolled at California State University, Fullerton to play college baseball for the Cal State Fullerton Titans, exclusively as a pitcher. In 2013, his freshman year, Eshelman did not issue a walk in his first 63 1/3 innings pitched. He ended the season with three walks allowed in 115 2/3 innings, setting the National Collegiate Athletic Association single-season record for walks per nine innings pitched (0.23). He was named to the 2013 College Baseball All-America Team by Baseball America and Collegiate Baseball. In 2014, he was a member of the United States national collegiate baseball team. He finished his collegiate career with 17 walks in 362 2/3 innings.

== Professional career ==
=== Houston Astros ===
MLB.com ranked Eshelman as the 99th best available prospect in the 2015 Major League Baseball draft, while Baseball America rated him 126th. The Houston Astros selected Eshelman in the second round, with the 46th overall pick, in the draft. Eshelman signed with the Astros, who assigned him to the Gulf Coast Astros of the Rookie-level Gulf Coast League to limit his workload for the remainder of the year, following the 130 innings Eshelman pitched for Cal State Fullerton in 2015. In August, the Astros promoted Eshelman to the Quad Cities River Bandits of the Single-A Midwest League. He pitched in only four games as a professional in 2015. Eshelman went a combined 0–1 with a 4.35 ERA between both clubs.

=== Philadelphia Phillies ===
The Astros traded Eshelman, Mark Appel, Vince Velasquez, Brett Oberholtzer, and Harold Arauz to the Philadelphia Phillies in exchange for Ken Giles and Jonathan Araúz on December 12, 2015. He spent the 2016 season with the Clearwater Threshers of the High-A Florida State League and the Reading Fightin Phils of the Double-A Eastern League, where he posted a 9–7 record with a 4.25 ERA, along with a 0.97 WHIP, between both clubs.

Eshelman began the 2017 season with Reading, and earned a promotion to the Lehigh Valley IronPigs of the Triple-A International League in May. He posted a combined 13–3 record with a 2.40 ERA between both teams. The 2018 season found him once again on the IronPigs’ roster. The season was mostly a disappointment, with Eshelman going 2–13, with a 5.84 ERA in 27 games (26 of them as a starter).

Eshelman began the 2019 season in with Reading but was promoted back to Lehigh Valley after six starts with the team, going 0–3 with a 6.28 ERA.

=== Baltimore Orioles ===
The Phillies traded Eshelman to the Baltimore Orioles in exchange for international bonus allocations on June 10, 2019. Eshelman had posted a 1–1 record with a 2.77 ERA, 23 strikeouts, and a complete game for Lehigh Valley at the time of the trade.

After making three starts for the Norfolk Tides of the International League, the Orioles promoted Eshelman to the major leagues to start against the Tampa Bay Rays on July 1. In his debut, he allowed two runs over five innings pitched. On September 2, Eshelman was designated for assignment.

On July 31, 2020, Eshelman was selected to Baltimore's active roster. In 2020 for the Orioles, Eshelman pitched in 34 2/3 innings over 12 games, notching a 3–1 record, 3.89 ERA and 16 strikeouts. On November 25, Eshelman was designated for assignment. He elected free agency on December 3.

On January 16, 2021, Eshelman re-signed with the Orioles organization on a minor league contract. The Orioles added Eshelman to their active roster on June 18, and designated him for assignment on August 1. On August 3, Eshelman cleared waivers and was assigned outright to Triple-A Norfolk. On September 19, the Orioles once more selected Eshelman's contract. Eshelman made 9 appearances for the Orioles in 2021, going 0–3 with a 7.16 ERA and 11 strikeouts. On October 25, Eshelman elected free agency.

=== San Diego Padres ===
On March 21, 2022, Eshelman signed a minor league contract with the San Diego Padres. He made 27 appearances split between the Double-A San Antonio Missions and Triple-A El Paso Chihuahuas, struggling to a 4-7 record and 5.76 ERA with 68 strikeouts across 114 innings pitched. Eshelman was released by the Padres organization on October 16.

== Post-playing career ==
=== San Diego Padres ===
Eshelman announced his retirement from professional baseball on December 5, 2022, and that he will be joining the San Diego Padres organization as a pitching coach. On January 11, 2023, Eshelman was named the pitching coach of the Lake Elsinore Storm. He was named pitching coach of the Fort Wayne TinCaps for the 2024 season.

=== Baltimore Orioles ===
On February 3, 2026, Eshelman was announced as an upper-level pitching coordinator in the Baltimore Orioles organization.

=== TCU ===
On July 7, 2026, Eshelman was hired to serve as the pitching coach for the TCU Horned Frogs.
