= Héctor Neris =

Dominican baseball player (born 1989)

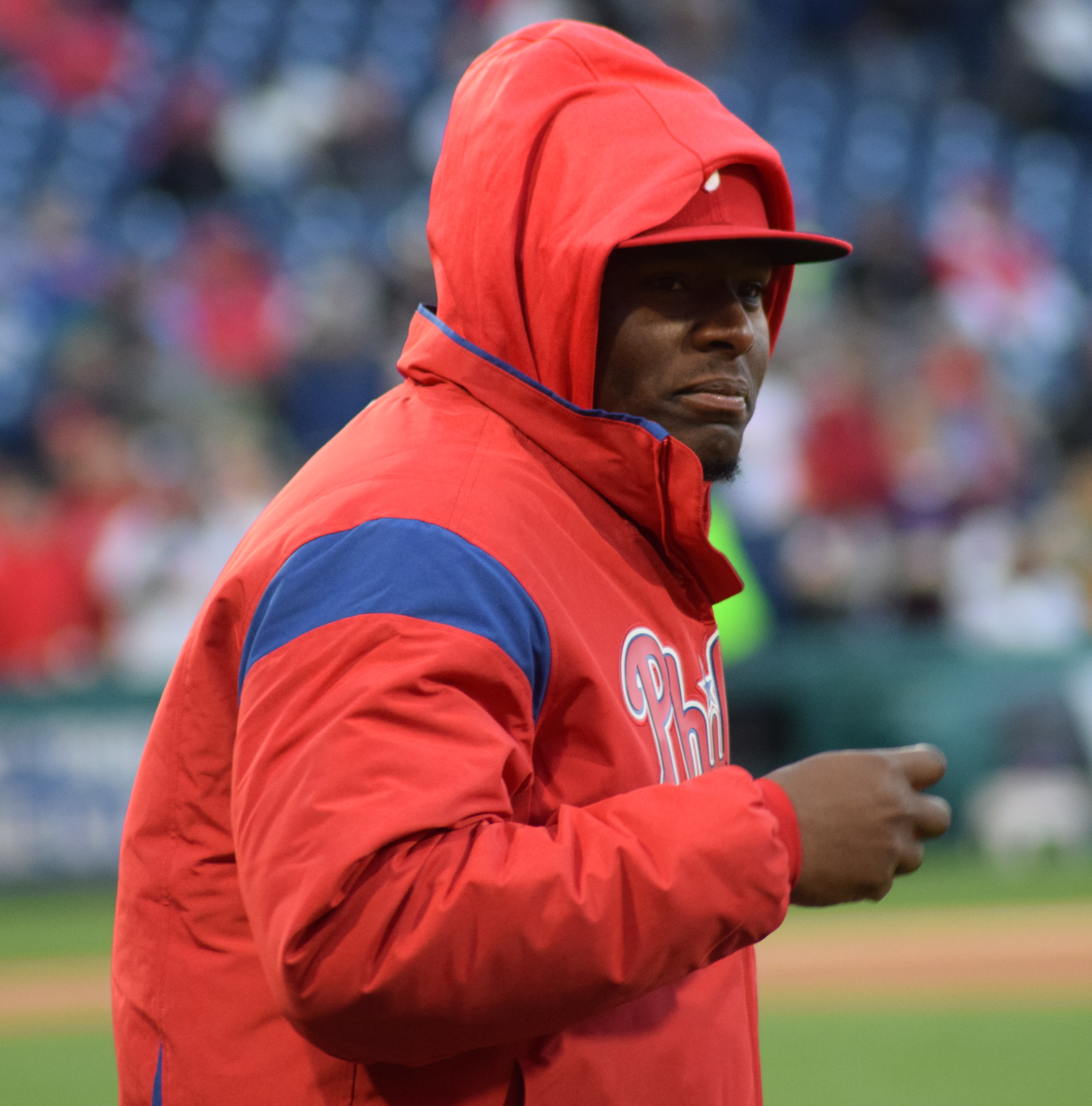
- Neris with the Phillies in 2019

Free agent
- Pitcher
- Born: June 14, 1989 (age 37); Villa Altagracia, Dominican Republic
- Bats: Right Throws: Right

MLB debut
- August 5, 2014, for the Philadelphia Phillies

MLB statistics (through 2025 season)
- Win–loss record: 46–43
- Earned run average: 3.47
- Strikeouts: 775
- Saves: 107
- Stats at Baseball Reference

Teams
- Philadelphia Phillies (2014–2021); Houston Astros (2022–2023); Chicago Cubs (2024); Houston Astros (2024); Atlanta Braves (2025); Los Angeles Angels (2025); Houston Astros (2025)

Career highlights and awards
- World Series champion (2022); Pitched a combined no-hitter on June 25, 2022

Héctor Neris (born June 14, 1989) is a Dominican professional baseball pitcher who is a free agent. He has previously played in Major League Baseball (MLB) for the Philadelphia Phillies, Houston Astros, Chicago Cubs, Atlanta Braves, and Los Angeles Angels. He signed with the Phillies as an international free agent in 2010, and made his MLB debut with them in 2014.

== Early life ==
Héctor Neris was born in Villa Altagracia, in the Dominican Republic. He played volleyball, basketball, and chess at the Colegio José Francisco Peña Gómez, graduating in 2008.

== Career ==
=== Philadelphia Phillies ===
==== 2010–12 ====
Neris signed as a free agent by the Philadelphia Phillies on May 28, 2010. He pitched for the Dominican Summer League Phillies and had a 1–1 win–loss record with five saves and a 3.24 earned run average (ERA) with 34 strikeouts in 41 2/3 innings pitched, holding batters to a .199 batting average against.

In 2011, Neris split the season between the Low–A Williamsport Crosscutters and the Single–A Lakewood BlueClaws. Neris was a combined 3–2 with a 2.75 ERA and 72 strikeouts in 59 innings, averaging 11.0 strikeouts per 9 innings pitched.

In 2012, Neris pitched for the High–A Clearwater Threshers. He was 4–2 with six saves, a 3.55 ERA, and 94 strikeouts in 78 2/3 innings, averaging 10.8 strikeouts per 9 innings pitched.

==== 2013–15 ====
In 2013, Neris pitched for the Double–A Reading Fightin Phils. He was 6–4 with a 4.55 earned run average and 93 strikeouts in 97 innings. In 2014 in the minors Neris split his time between Reading and the Triple–A Lehigh Valley IronPigs. He was a combined 6–3 with two saves, a 3.61 earned run average and 70 strikeouts in 77 1/3 innings.

Neris was called up to the majors for the first time on August 3, 2014. He made his major league debut on August 5 versus the Houston Astros, pitching a scoreless top of the 15th inning; the Phillies scored in the bottom of the inning, earning Neris his first major league victory. However, after the game, he was optioned back to Lehigh Valley to open a roster spot for the next night's starting pitcher, David Buchanan. In 2014 with the Phillies he pitched in only that one game.

He split time in 2015 between the Triple–A Lehigh Valley and the Phillies bullpen, appearing in 35 games. Neris finished 2–2 for the Phillies with a 3.79 earned run average with 41 strikeouts in 40 1/3 innings, averaging 9.2 strikeouts per 9 innings pitched. With Lehigh Valley, he was 1–3 with one save, a 3.62 earned run average and 35 strikeouts in 37 2/3 innings.

==== 2016–2021 ====
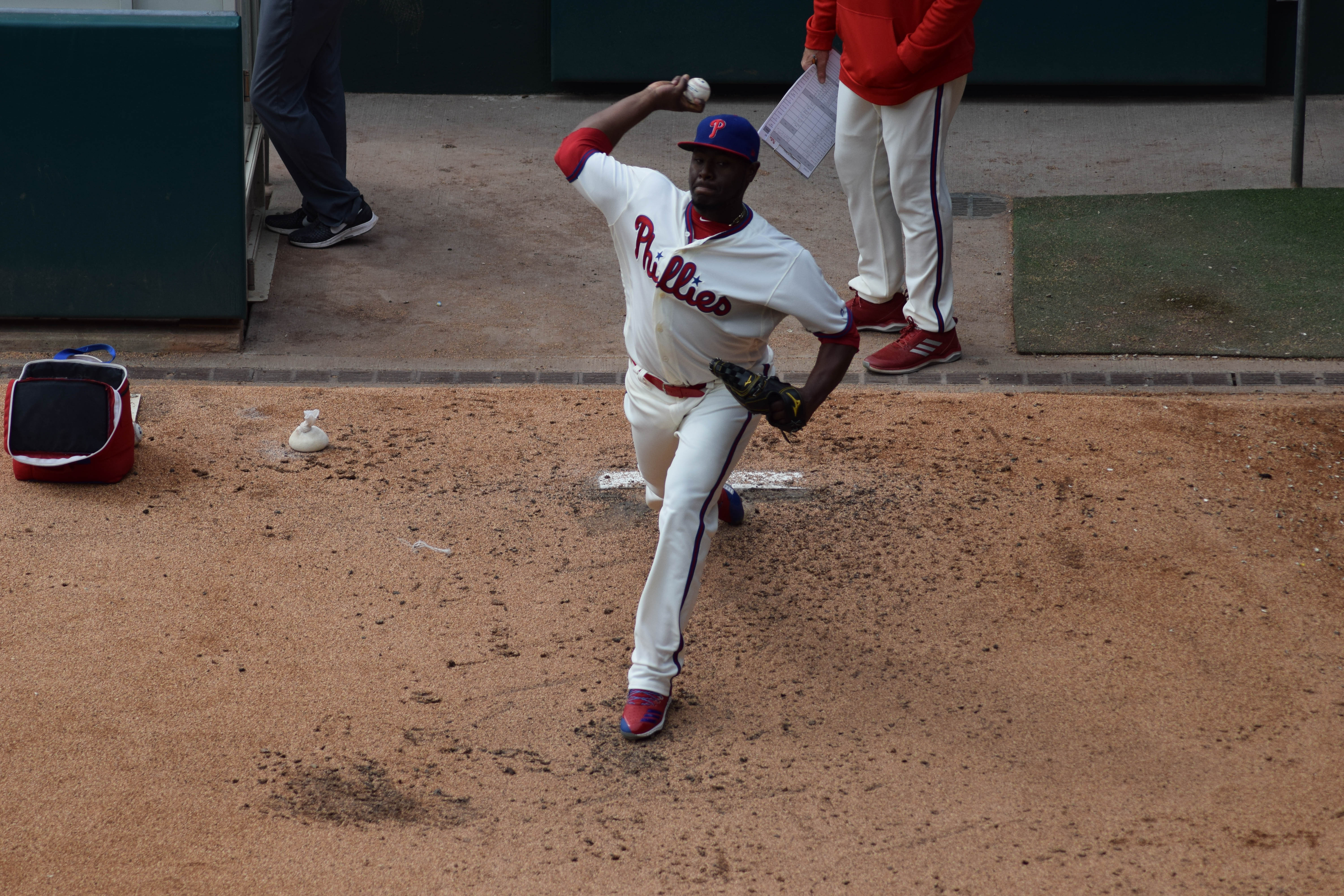
Phillies pitcher Hector Neris warms up in the bullpen on April 7, 2019

In 2016, Neris served as a setup man in the Phillies bullpen, with a record of 4–4, 2 saves, 28 holds (tied for 4th in the NL), and posting an earned run average of 2.58 in 79 games (3rd in the National League). In 80 1/3 innings, he struck out 102 batters (2nd-most ever by a Phillies reliever, behind Dick Selma in 1970, and 31.1% of the batters he faced), averaging 11.4 strikeouts per 9 innings pitched.

He pitched for the Dominican Republic national baseball team in the 2017 World Baseball Classic.

In 2017, Neris served as the Phillies closer. He was 4–5 with a 3.01 earned run average and had 26 saves (8th in the league) in 29 opportunities, and pitched in 74 games (5th in the NL). He struck out 86 batters in 74 2/3 innings, averaging 10.4 strikeouts per 9 innings pitched. He threw a splitter 51.3% of the time, tops in the major leagues.

Neris began the 2018 season as the team's closer, but was demoted from the role a month into the season, and on June 18 was optioned to Triple–A. He was recalled just three days later. On June 29 he was optioned to Triple–A for a second stint, after giving up five earned runs in a 17–7 loss to the Washington Nationals. Neris returned to the major leagues on August 14. He was named NL Reliever of the Month for August, after striking out 20 of the 32 batters he faced that month (62.5%). In 2018 with the Phillies, he was 1–2 with 11 saves, a 5.10 earned run average, and 76 strike outs in 47 2/3 innings, averaging 14.3 strikeouts per 9 innings pitched. The only NL pitcher with a higher strikeout rate than Neris in 2018 was Josh Hader. He threw a four-seam fastball that averaged 95 miles per hour. He also threw a splitter 49.1% of the time, tops in the major leagues. In 2018 with Triple–A Lehigh Valley, he was 2–0 with one save, a 1.15 earned run average, and 31 strikeouts in 18 2/3 innings, averaging 14.9 strikeouts per 9 innings pitched.

In 2019 with the Phillies, Neris was 3–6 with 28 saves (7th in the National League) and a 2.93 earned run average in 68 relief appearances, with 89 strike outs in 67 2/3 innings (averaging 11.8 strikeouts per 9 innings). In 2020 for Philadelphia, Neris pitched to a 2–2 record with 5 saves and a 4.57 earned run average to go along with 27 strikeouts across 21 2/3 innings pitched in 24 games. In 2021, Neris went 4–7 with 12 saves in 19 chances, recording a 3.63 earned run average and 98 strikeouts in 74 1/3 innings.

=== Houston Astros ===
On November 30, 2021, Neris signed a two-year contract worth $17 million with the Houston Astros. On April 12, 2022, at Chase Field, he struck out two in a perfect eighth inning versus the Arizona Diamondbacks to earn his first win in an Astros uniform in a 2–1 score. On June 7, 2022, Neris was suspended 4 games for throwing at the head of the Seattle Mariners third basemen Eugenio Suárez.

He pitched the eighth inning of a combined no-hitter and 3–0 win over the New York Yankees on June 25, 2022. The 14th no-hitter in Astros' history, Cristian Javier started the game and Ryan Pressly closed it for a save. Neris struck out two on July 3 in a 4–2 victory over the Los Angeles Angels in which Astros pitchers struck out 20 batters to establish a franchise record in a nine inning contest. Contributing were starter Framber Valdez (first six innings), Neris (7th), Rafael Montero (8th) and Pressly (9th). (Note: In the series with Los Angeles, Astros pitching recorded 48 strikeouts to establish a major league record for strikeouts over a three-game played without extra innings.)

Neris earned his second save of the season on August 12, 2022, by throwing a scoreless ninth in a 7–5 win over the Oakland Athletics. On September 19, Neris closed out the final inning of a 4–0 defeat of the Tampa Bay Rays and clinch a fifth American League West division title for the Astros over the previous six seasons. On October 4, 2022, Neris made his first career appearance versus the Phillies and induced two perfect outs in an on-going no-hitter that Houston pitching maintained until the ninth inning.

For the 2022 regular season, Neris made 70 appearances, ranking fifth in the AL among pitchers, and had 25 holds, which tied for third and led the Astros. He produced a 3.72 ERA, 6–4 W–L, three saves, 2.35 Fielding Independent Pitching (FIP), 79 strikeouts, 17 bases on balls, and three home runs allowed over 65 1/3 IP for ratios of 10.9 strikeouts per nine innings pitched (K/9), 4.65 strikeouts to walks (K/BB), and 0.4 home runs per nine innings (HR/9).

In his first career postseason appearance, Neris induced a two-out, bases-loaded groundout from Cal Raleigh in the sixth inning in Game 2 of the American League Division Series {ALDS} versus the Seattle Mariners, and was the winning pitcher. He allowed a go-ahead home run in Game 4 of the American League Championship Series (ALCS) versus the Yankees, but the Astros rallied the following inning to win the game, making him the pitcher of note as the Astros won the pennant in four games. The Astros again faced the Phillies in the World Series and defeated them in six games to give Neris his first World Series title, and he pitched a scoreless seventh inning in the Game 6 clincher. He went 2–0 in the postseason, allowing two hits and one run over eight appearances and six innings (1.50 ERA). He struck out nine, allowed no walks, and this performance netted a 9.9% championship win probability added (cWPA).

=== Chicago Cubs ===
On February 1, 2024, Neris signed a one-year, $9 million contract with the Chicago Cubs. In 46 relief outings for Chicago, he compiled an 8–4 record and 3.89 ERA with 46 strikeouts and 17 saves over 44 innings. Neris was released by the Cubs on August 20.

=== Houston Astros (second stint) ===
On August 24, 2024, Neris re-signed with the Astros on a major league contract. He made 16 appearances as a member of the Astros, with 15 1/3 innings and 8 earned runs allowed (4.70 ERA) and 1.043 walks plus hits per inning pitched (WHIP), which was significantly improved. However, he allowed 4 home runs (2.3 per 9 IP), a significant regression. In the AL Wild Card Series (WCS), he made one scoreless appearance versus the Detroit Tigers, getting both outs of 2/3 inning via strikeout. Following the season, he elected free agency.

=== Atlanta Braves ===
On March 3, 2025, Neris signed a minor league contract with the Atlanta Braves. On March 21, the Braves selected Neris' contract after he made the team's Opening Day roster. In 2 appearances for Atlanta, he allowed 5 runs on 5 hits with 1 strikeout in 1 inning pitched. Neris was designated for assignment following the promotion of Jesse Chavez on March 31. He elected free agency on April 2.

=== Los Angeles Angels ===
On April 16, 2025, Neris signed a minor league contract with the Los Angeles Angels. He was subsequently assigned to the Triple-A Salt Lake Bees. On May 6, the Angels selected Neris' contract, adding him to their active roster. In 21 appearances for the Angels, he registered a 3–0 record and 5.14 ERA with 19 strikeouts across 14 innings pitched. Neris was designated for assignment by Los Angeles on June 28. He was released after clearing waivers on July 3.

=== Houston Astros (third stint) ===
On July 5, 2025, Neris signed a major league contract with the Houston Astros. In 12 appearances for Houston, he posted an 0–1 record and 5.40 ERA with 15 strikeouts across 11 2/3 innings pitched. Neris was designated for assignment by the Astros on August 12. He elected free agency after clearing waivers on August 16.

=== Kansas City Royals ===
On January 26, 2026, Neris signed a minor league contract with the Kansas City Royals. He was released on March 22, 2026.

== Pitching style ==
As of 2022, the right-hander Neris relies on four pitches in his pitching repertoire, a four-seam fastball averaging 94 miles per hour, a sinker averaging near 95 miles per hour, a splitter averaging 84 miles per hour, and a slider averaging about 88 miles per hour. Neris likes to use his split-fingered fastball as an out pitch, utilizing it at higher percentage than his four-seam fastball and sinker. He threw the split-finger 40.6% in the 2021 season after throwing it a career high 65.3% in 2019. In 2019, he collected a career high 28 saves, with 57 strikeouts, on his splitter alone. Neris utilizes the splitter especially for swinging strikeouts, since splitters appear to have a typical fastball movement until it drops suddenly as it comes to the plate. This resulted in Neris collecting a 45% whiff percentage on his splitter in the 2021 season. Neris throws his slider the least out of his four pitches, never throwing it for more than 17 percent of all his pitches in every season he utilized it since 2015.

Neris pitches from the set position, starting his delivery after receiving the pitch call by tucking the baseball behind his glove near his hip, similar to former Phillies closer Jonathan Papelbon; this windup adds deception.

Neris is a very expressive player on the mound, often celebrating after getting important outs, particularly clutch strikeouts on hitters late in games, such as getting the final out to register a save. After retiring Justin Turner on a flyout to collect a save against the Dodgers in 2019, Neris reportedly shouted expletives towards the Dodgers' dugout while celebrating, which Dodgers' manager Dave Roberts found a bit much. "To look in our dugout and to taunt in any way, I think it’s unacceptable..."

== See also ==
- List of Houston Astros no-hitters
- List of Major League Baseball no-hitters
- List of Major League Baseball players from the Dominican Republic

Awards and achievements
Preceded by Felipe Vázquez	National League Reliever of the Month; August 2018	Succeeded by Corey Knebel
Preceded by Reid Detmers	No-hitter pitcher June 25, 2022 (with Cristian Javier & Ryan Pressly)	Succeeded by Cristian Javier, Bryan Abreu; Rafael Montero, & Ryan Pressly
