= 2020 Miami Marlins season =

2020 Miami Marlins
- National League East 2nd Place
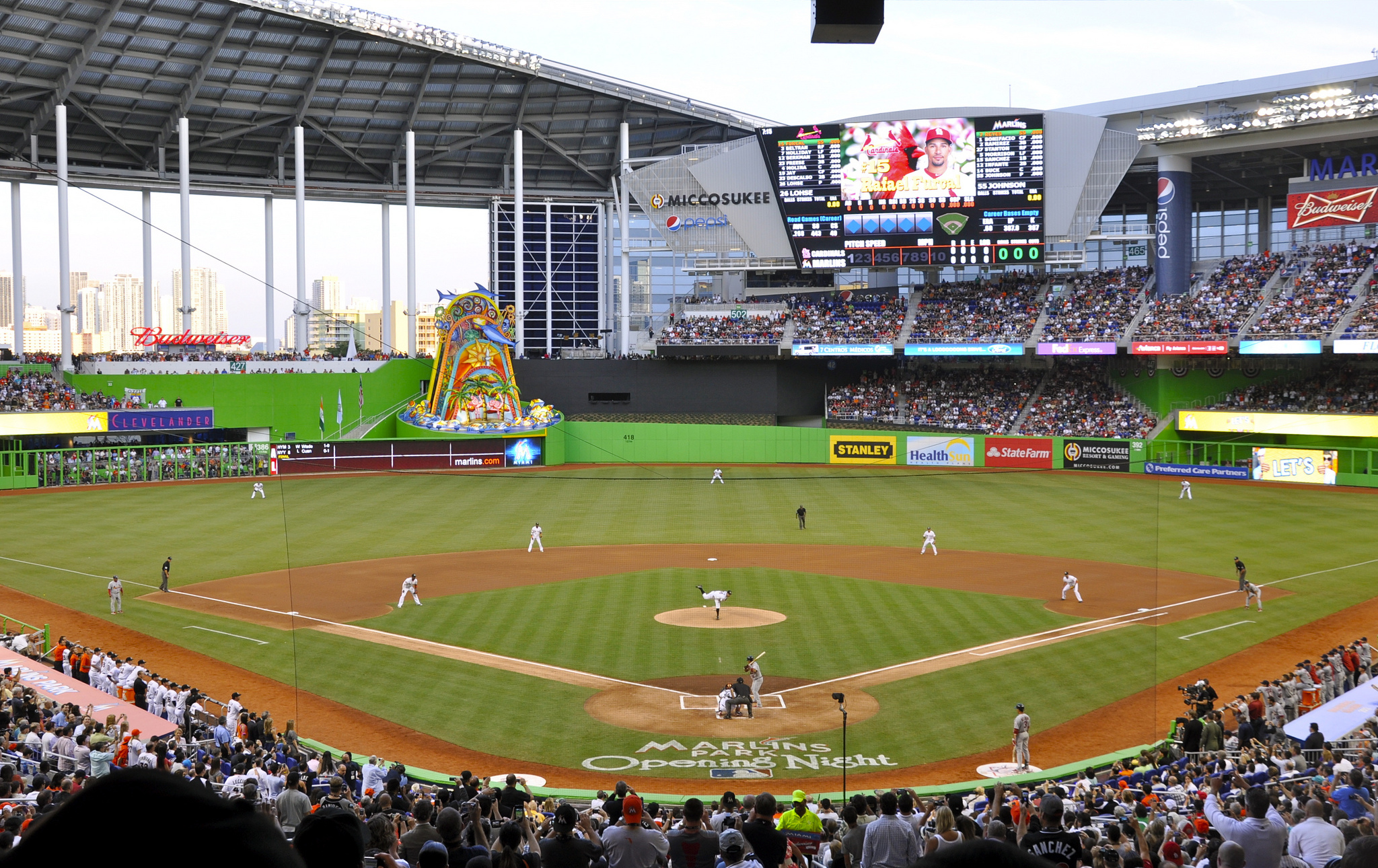
- Marlins Park, home of the Miami Marlins
- League: National League
- Division: East
- Ballpark: Marlins Park
- City: Miami, Florida
- Record: 31–29 (.517)
- Divisional place: 2nd
- Owners: Bruce Sherman and Derek Jeter
- President of baseball operations: Michael Hill
- Managers: Don Mattingly
- Television: Fox Sports Florida; Sun Sports (English: Paul Severino, Craig Minervini, Todd Hollandsworth) (Spanish: Raul Striker Jr., Cookie Rojas)
- Radio: WINZ; Miami Marlins Radio Network (English) (Dave Van Horne, Glenn Geffner); WAQI (Spanish) (Luis Quintana)

The 2020 Miami Marlins season was the 28th season for the Major League Baseball (MLB) franchise in the National League and the ninth as the "Miami" Marlins. The Marlins played their home games at Marlins Park as members of the National League East. On September 25, with a 4–3 victory in 10 innings against the New York Yankees, the Marlins secured second place in the NL East, clinching their first playoff berth since 2003. The team dramatically improved its winning percentage from the previous year (.352 to .517) and made the playoffs in the 60-game season. The Marlins became just the second team in MLB history to reach the postseason the season after losing at least 100 games, joining the 2017 Minnesota Twins. They subsequently swept the Chicago Cubs in the NLWCS before losing in a three-game sweep to the Atlanta Braves in the NLDS, marking their first postseason series loss in franchise history.

On March 12, 2020, MLB announced that because of the ongoing COVID-19 pandemic, the start of the regular season would be delayed by at least two weeks in addition to the remainder of spring training being cancelled. Four days later, it was announced that the start of the season would be pushed back indefinitely due to the recommendation made by the CDC to restrict events of more than 50 people for eight weeks. On June 23, commissioner Rob Manfred unilaterally implemented a 60-game season. Players reported to training camps on July 1 in order to resume spring training and prepare for a July 24 Opening Day.

== Offseason ==
On January 6, 2020, outfielder Corey Dickerson signed a two-year, $17.5 million contract with the Marlins.

== Regular season ==
From April 28–30, the Marlins were supposed to play against the New York Mets in the Puerto Rico Series in San Juan. But due to the pandemic, the series was cancelled.

=== Game log ===
2020 game log: 31–29 (Home: 15–15; Away: 16–14)
July: 2–1 (Home: 0–0; Away: 2–1)

#	Date	Opponent	Score	Win	Loss	Save	Record	Box/Streak
1	July 24	@ Phillies	5–2	**Alcántara** (1–0)	Nola (0–1)	**Kintzler** (1)	1–0	W1
2	July 25	@ Phillies	1–7	Wheeler (1–0)	**Vesia** (0–1)	—	1–1	L1
3	July 26	@ Phillies	11–6	**Tarpley** (1–0)	Irvin (0–1)	—	2–1	W1
—	July 27	Orioles	Postponed (COVID-19); Makeup: Aug 5					
—	July 28	Orioles	Postponed (COVID-19); Makeup: Aug 6					
—	July 29	@ Orioles	Postponed (COVID-19); Makeup: Aug 4					
—	July 30	@ Orioles	Postponed (COVID-19); Makeup: Aug 5					
—	July 31	Nationals	Postponed (COVID-19); Makeup: Aug 22					

August: 13–14 (Home: 5–8; Away: 8–6)

#	Date	Opponent	Score	Win	Loss	Save	Record	Box/Streak
—	August 1	Nationals	Postponed (COVID-19); Makeup: Sep 18					
—	August 2	Nationals	Postponed (COVID-19); Makeup: Sep 20					
—	August 4	Phillies	Postponed (COVID-19); Makeup: Sep 11					
4	August 4	@ Orioles	4–0	**López** (1–0)	Means (0–1)	—	3–1	W2
—	August 5	Phillies	Postponed (COVID-19); Makeup: Sep 13					
5	August 5 (1)	@ Orioles	1–0 (7)	**Vincent** (1–0)	Cobb (1–1)	**Kintzler** (2)	4–1	W3
6	August 5 (2)	Orioles	2–1	**Moran** (1–0)	Wojciechowski (0–2)	**Tarpley** (1)	5–1	W4
—	August 6	Phillies	Postponed (COVID-19); Makeup: Sep 14					
7	August 6	Orioles	8–7	**Morin** (1–0)	Phillips (1–1)	**Kintzler** (3)	6–1	W5
8	August 7	@ Mets	4–3	**Tarpley** (2–0)	Wacha (1–2)	**Vincent** (1)	7–1	W6
9	August 8	@ Mets	4–8	Peterson (2–1)	**Castano** (0–1)	—	7–2	L1
10	August 9	@ Mets	2–4	deGrom (2–0)	**López** (1–1)	Lugo (3)	7–3	L2
11	August 11	@ Blue Jays	4–5 (10)	Cole (1–0)	**Tarpley** (2–1)	—	7–4	L3
12	August 12	@ Blue Jays	14–11 (10)	**Kintzler** (1–0)	Dolis (0–1)	**Smith** (1)	8–4	W1
13	August 14	Braves	8–2	**López** (2–1)	Wright (0–3)	—	9–4	W2
14	August 15	Braves	1–2	Smith (1–0)	**Kintzler** (1–1)	Melancon (4)	9–5	L1
15	August 16	Braves	0–4	O'Day (2–0)	**Vincent** (1–1)	—	9–6	L2
16	August 17	Mets	4–11	Shreve (1–0)	**Yamamoto** (0–1)	Kilome (1)	9–7	L3
17	August 18	Mets	3–8	Wilson (1–1)	**Mejía** (0–1)	—	9–8	L4
18	August 19	Mets	3–5	Díaz (1–0)	**Kintzler** (1–2)	—	9–9	L5
—	August 20	Mets	Postponed (COVID-19); Makeup: Aug 25					
19	August 21	@ Nationals	3–2	**Hernández** (1–0)	Corbin (2–2)	**Kintzler** (4)	10–9	W1
20	August 22 (1)	@ Nationals	4–5 (7)	Finnegan (1–0)	**Castano** (0–2)	Hudson (6)	10–10	L1
21	August 22 (2)	Nationals	5–3 (7)	**Sánchez** (1–0)	Crowe (0–1)	**Kintzler** (5)	11–10	W1
22	August 23	@ Nationals	3–9	Sánchez (1–3)	**Mejía** (0–2)	—	11–11	L1
23	August 24	@ Nationals	11–8	**López** (3–1)	Voth (0–3)	**Kintzler** (6)	12–11	W1
24	August 25 (1)	@ Mets	4–0 (7)	**Bleier** (1–0)	Porcello (1–2)	—	13–11	W2
25	August 25 (2)	Mets	3–0 (7)	**Smith** (1–0)	Hughes (0–1)	**Vincent** (2)	14–11	W3
26	August 26	@ Mets	4–5	Brach (1–0)	**Vincent** (1–2)	—	14–12	L1
—	August 27	@ Mets	Postponed (strikes due to shooting of Jacob Blake); Makeup: Aug 31					
27	August 28	Rays	0–2	Fairbanks (4–1)	**Bleier** (1–1)	Castillo (2)	14–13	L2
28	August 29	Rays	0–4	Fleming (2–0)	**López** (3–2)	—	14–14	L3
29	August 30	Rays	7–12	Snell (3–0)	**Alcántara** (1–1)	—	14–15	L4
30	August 31	@ Mets	5–3	**Rogers** (1–0)	deGrom (2–1)	**Kintzler** (7)	15–15	W1

September: 16–14 (Home: 10–7; Away: 6–7)

#	Date	Opponent	Score	Win	Loss	Save	Record	Box/Streak
31	September 1	Blue Jays	3–2	**Hoyt** (1–0)	Yamaguchi (1–3)	**Kintzler** (8)	16–15	W2
32	September 2	Blue Jays	1–2	Ryu (3–1)	**Sánchez** (1–1)	Bass (4)	16–16	L1
33	September 4	@ Rays	4–5	Fleming (3–0)	**López** (3–3)	Anderson (4)	16–17	L2
34	September 5	@ Rays	7–3	**Alcántara** (2–1)	Snell (3–1)	**Kintzler** (9)	17–17	W1
35	September 6	@ Rays	4–5 (10)	Curtiss (3–0)	**Kintzler** (1–3)	—	17–18	L1
36	September 7	@ Braves	5–4 (10)	**Kintzler** (2–3)	Minter (1–1)	**Vincent** (3)	18–18	W1
37	September 8	@ Braves	8–0	**Sánchez** (2–1)	Wright (0–4)	—	19–18	W2
38	September 9	@ Braves	9–29	Dayton (2–0)	**López** (3–4)	Wilson (1)	19–19	L1
39	September 10	Phillies	7–6	**García** (1–0)	Workman (1–2)	—	20–19	W1
40	September 11 (1)	Phillies	0–11 (7)	Nola (5–3)	**Rogers** (1–1)	—	20–20	L1
41	September 11 (2)	Phillies	5–3 (7)	**Hoyt** (2–0)	Suárez (0–1)	**García** (1)	21–20	W1
42	September 12	Phillies	6–12	Hembree (3–0)	**Ureña** (0–1)	—	21–21	L1
43	September 13 (1)	Phillies	2–1 (7)	**Sánchez** (3–1)	Rosso (0–1)	—	22–21	W1
44	September 13 (2)	Phillies	8–1 (7)	**Garrett** (1–0)	Eflin (2–2)	—	23–21	W2
45	September 14	Phillies	6–2	**López** (4–4)	Velasquez (0–1)	—	24–21	W3
46	September 15	Red Sox	0–2	Houck (1–0)	**Alcántara** (2–2)	Barnes (7)	24–22	L1
47	September 16	Red Sox	8–4	**García** (2–0)	Kickham (1–1)	—	25–22	W1
48	September 17	Red Sox	3–5	Eovaldi (3–2)	**Ureña** (0–2)	Barnes (8)	25–23	L1
49	September 18 (1)	Nationals	0–5 (7)	Fedde (2–3)	**Sánchez** (3–2)	—	25–24	L2
50	September 18 (2)	Nationals	14–3 (7)	**García** (3–0)	Crowe (0–2)	—	26–24	W1
51	September 19	Nationals	7–3	**López** (5–4)	Corbin (2–6)	—	27–24	W2
52	September 20 (1)	Nationals	2–1 (7)	**Alcántara** (3–2)	Scherzer (4–4)	**Kintzler** (10)	28–24	W3
53	September 20 (2)	Nationals	0–15 (7)	Braymer (1–0)	**Garrett** (1–1)	—	28–25	L1
54	September 21	@ Braves	4–5	Matzek (4–3)	**Rogers** (1–2)	Melancon (11)	28–26	L2
55	September 22	@ Braves	1–11	Wilson (1–0)	**Ureña** (0–3)	—	28–27	L3
56	September 23	@ Braves	4–9	Jackson (2–0)	**Smith** (1–1)	—	28–28	L4
57	September 24	@ Braves	4–2	**López** (6–4)	Anderson (3–2)	**Kintzler** (11)	29–28	W1
58	September 25	@ Yankees	4–3 (10)	**Boxberger** (1–0)	Green (3–3)	**Kintzler** (12)	30–28	W2
59	September 26	@ Yankees	4–11	García (3–2)	**Tarpley** (2–2)	—	30–29	L1
60	September 27	@ Yankees	5–0	**Castano** (1–2)	Schmidt (0–1)	—	31–29	W1

Legend: = Win = Loss = Postponement
Bold = Marlins team member

=== Season standings ===
NL East
Team	W	L	Pct.	GB	Home	Road
Atlanta Braves	35	25	.583	—	19‍–‍11	16‍–‍14
Miami Marlins	31	29	.517	4	11‍–‍15	20‍–‍14
Philadelphia Phillies	28	32	.467	7	19‍–‍13	9‍–‍19
Washington Nationals	26	34	.433	9	15‍–‍18	11‍–‍16
New York Mets	26	34	.433	9	12‍–‍17	14‍–‍17

Division leaders
Team	W	L	Pct.
Los Angeles Dodgers	43	17	.717
Atlanta Braves	35	25	.583
Chicago Cubs	34	26	.567

Division 2nd place
Team	W	L	Pct.
San Diego Padres	37	23	.617
St. Louis Cardinals	30	28	.517
Miami Marlins	31	29	.517

Wild Card teams (Top 2 teams qualify for postseason)
Team	W	L	Pct.	GB
Cincinnati Reds	31	29	.517	+2
Milwaukee Brewers	29	31	.483	—
San Francisco Giants	29	31	.483	—
Philadelphia Phillies	28	32	.467	1
Washington Nationals	26	34	.433	3
New York Mets	26	34	.433	3
Colorado Rockies	26	34	.433	3
Arizona Diamondbacks	25	35	.417	4
Pittsburgh Pirates	19	41	.317	10

=== Record vs. opponents ===
2020 National League record Source: MLB Standings Grid – 2020
Team	**ATL**	**MIA**	**NYM**	**PHI**	**WSH**	AL
Atlanta	—	6–4	7–3	5–5	6–4	11–9
Miami	4–6	—	4–6	7–3	6–4	10–10
New York	3–7	6–4	—	4–6	4–6	9–11
Philadelphia	5–5	3–7	6–4	—	7–3	7–13
Washington	4–6	4–6	6–4	3–7	—	9–11

=== Season summary ===
==== COVID-19 outbreak ====
On opening day, July 24, 2020, Marlins catcher Jorge Alfaro was placed on the injured list after testing positive for COVID-19. First baseman Garrett Cooper and outfielder Harold Ramírez also tested positive for COVID-19 shortly thereafter. Two days later, prior to the final game of the opening series against the Philadelphia Phillies, scheduled starting pitcher, José Ureña, tested positive for COVID-19 and was scratched from his start. Following the game against the Phillies, the Marlins delayed their flight back to Miami due to concerns of an outbreak.

On July 27, the team's home opener against the Baltimore Orioles was postponed amid reports that eight new players had tested positive for COVID-19. Reports stated that 11 Marlins players and two coaches had tested positive. MLB also postponed the Phillies' next game against the New York Yankees as the Yankees would be using the same clubhouse as the Marlins. The Marlins remained in Philadelphia pending further testing.

On July 28, sources reported that at least four more members of the Marlins had tested positive for COVID-19. In five days, the Marlins had a total of 17 people test positive for the virus. The game scheduled for July 28 was also postponed. On the same day, the MLB announced that the Marlins and Phillies seasons would be put on hold. MLB officially postponed all games for the Marlins through August 2.

On July 30, an 18th player tested positive for COVID-19. The players and coaches who have tested positive are being transported back to Miami while the rest of the team will remain in Philadelphia. It was still uncertain whether the team would return to play on August 4. The team returned to play on August 4 with a roster that included 16 new players after 18 players and two coaches ended up testing positive. The Marlins placed a total of 17 players on the injured list and had an eighth player, Isan Díaz opt out of the remainder of the season. The game against the Orioles was delayed 40 minutes as MLB waited for final test results to be received. The Marlins went on to win their first five games after returning to play.

==== Achievements ====
On August 7, manager Don Mattingly won his 282nd game as manager of the Marlins, becoming the winningest manager in Marlins' franchise history.

== Postseason ==
=== Game log ===
2020 postseason game log: 2–3 (Home: 0–1; Away: 2–2)
NL Wild Card Series: 2–0 (Home: 0–0; Away: 2–0)

title	#	Date	Opponent	Score	Win	Loss	Save	Attendance	Record	Box/Streak
1	September 30	@ Cubs	5–1	Alcántara (1–0)	Hendricks (0–1)	—	1–0	W1		
—	October 1	@ Cubs	Postponed (inclement weather)							
2	October 2	@ Cubs	2–0	Boxberger (1–0)	Darvish (0–1)	Kintzler (1)	2–0	W2		

NL Division Series: 0–3 (Home: 0–1; Away: 0–2)

#	Date	Opponent	Score	Win	Loss	Save	Record	Box/Streak
1	October 6	@ Braves	5–9	Smith (1–0)	Alcántara (0–1)	—	0–1	L1
2	October 7	@ Braves	0–2	Anderson (1–0)	López (0–1)	Melancon (1)	0–2	L2
3	October 8	Braves	0–7	Wright (1–0)	Sánchez (0–1)	—	0–3	L3
all games played at Minute Maid Park in Houston, Texas

=== Postseason rosters ===
Playoff rosters
National League Wild Card Series

- Pitchers: 22 Sandy Alcántara 27 Brandon Kintzler 33 Brad Boxberger 35 Richard Bleier 37 Stephen Tarpley 39 James Hoyt 49 Pablo López 55 Ryne Stanek 59 Nick Neidert 73 Sixto Sánchez 93 Yimi García 94 Braxton Garrett 95 Trevor Rogers
- Catchers: 17 Chad Wallach 38 Jorge Alfaro
- Infielders: 5 Jon Berti 15 Brian Anderson 19 Miguel Rojas 26 Garrett Cooper 68 Lewin Díaz 70 Jazz Chisholm Jr.
- Outfielders: 4 Monte Harrison 6 Starling Marte 7 Matt Joyce 23 Corey Dickerson 25 Lewis Brinson 34 Magneuris Sierra
- Designated hitters: 24 Jesús Aguilar

National League Division Series

- Pitchers: 22 Sandy Alcántara 27 Brandon Kintzler 33 Brad Boxberger 35 Richard Bleier 39 James Hoyt 44 Nick Vincent 49 Pablo López 55 Ryne Stanek 59 Nick Neidert 72 Daniel Castano 73 Sixto Sánchez 93 Yimi García 94 Braxton Garrett 95 Trevor Rogers
- Catchers: 17 Chad Wallach 38 Jorge Alfaro
- Infielders: 5 Jon Berti 13 Sean Rodriguez 15 Brian Anderson 19 Miguel Rojas 26 Garrett Cooper 70 Jazz Chisholm Jr.
- Outfielders: 4 Monte Harrison 7 Matt Joyce 23 Corey Dickerson 25 Lewis Brinson 34 Magneuris Sierra
- Designated hitters: 24 Jesús Aguilar

== Roster ==
2020 Miami Marlins
Roster
Pitchers: 22 Sandy Alcántara; 35 Richard Bleier; 33 Brad Boxberger; 43 Jeff Brigham; 72 Daniel Castano; 64 Robert Dugger; 52 Brett Eibner; 93 Yimi García; 94 Braxton Garrett; 75 Jorge Guzmán; 57 Elieser Hernández; 78 Jordan Holloway; 39 James Hoyt; 27 Brandon Kintzler; 86 Brandon Leibrandt; 49 Pablo López; 77 Humberto Mejía; 60 Brian Moran; 48 Mike Morin; 59 Nick Neidert; 77 Johan Quezada; 95 Trevor Rogers; 73 Sixto Sánchez; 51 Justin Shafer; 56 Sterling Sharp; 31 Caleb Smith; 58 Josh A. Smith; 54 Josh D. Smith; 55 Ryne Stanek; 37 Stephen Tarpley; 41 Jesús Tinoco; 62 José Ureña; 46 Pat Venditte; 96 Alex Vesia; 44 Nick Vincent; 50 Jordan Yamamoto	Catchers: 38 Jorge Alfaro; 29 Francisco Cervelli; 36 Ryan Lavarnway; 87 Brian Navarreto; 17 Chad Wallach; Infielders: 24 Jesús Aguilar; 65 Eddy Alvarez; 15 Brian Anderson; 5 Jon Berti; 70 Jazz Chisholm Jr.; 26 Garrett Cooper; 1 Isan Díaz; 68 Lewin Díaz; 11 Logan Forsythe; 13 Sean Rodriguez; 19 Miguel Rojas; 2 Jonathan Villar	Outfielders: 25 Lewis Brinson; 23 Corey Dickerson; 4 Monte Harrison; 7 Matthew Joyce; 6 Starling Marte; 47 Harold Ramírez; 76 Jesús Sánchez; 34 Magneuris Sierra	Manager: 8 Don Mattingly; Coaches: 85 Rob Flippo (bullpen coordinator); 3 Trey Hillman (third base); 28 Billy Hatcher (first base); 40 Eric Duncan (hitting); 30 Mel Stottlemyre Jr. (pitching); 82 James Rowson (bench/offensive coordinator); 21 Wellington Cepeda (bullpen); 12 Eddy Rodriguez (catching); 18 Robert Rodriguez (assistant hitting); 99 Koji Tanaka (bullpen catcher)

== Player stats ==
=== Batting ===
Note: G = Games played; AB = At bats; R = Runs; H = Hits; 2B = Doubles; 3B = Triples; HR = Home runs; RBI = Runs batted in; SB = Stolen bases; BB = Walks; AVG = Batting average; SLG = Slugging average

Player	G	AB	R	H	2B	3B	HR	RBI	SB	BB	AVG	SLG
Brian Anderson	59	200	27	51	7	1	11	38	0	22	.255	.465
Corey Dickerson	52	194	25	50	5	1	7	17	1	15	.258	.402
Jesús Aguilar	51	188	31	52	10	0	8	34	0	23	.277	.457
Matt Joyce	46	127	16	32	4	0	2	14	1	20	.252	.331
Miguel Rojas	40	125	20	38	10	1	4	20	5	16	.304	.496
Jon Berti	39	120	21	31	5	0	2	14	9	23	.258	.350
Garrett Cooper	34	120	20	34	8	0	6	20	0	11	.283	.500
Jonathan Villar	30	116	10	30	4	0	2	9	9	10	.259	.345
Starling Marte	28	106	13	26	6	0	4	13	5	2	.245	.415
Lewis Brinson	47	106	14	24	6	0	3	12	4	6	.226	.368
Jorge Alfaro	31	93	12	21	2	0	3	16	2	4	.226	.344
Jazz Chisholm Jr.	21	56	8	9	1	1	2	6	2	5	.161	.321
Francisco Cervelli	16	53	10	13	2	0	3	7	1	8	.245	.453
Monte Harrison	32	47	8	8	1	0	1	3	6	4	.170	.255
Magneuris Sierra	19	44	8	11	3	1	0	7	4	5	.250	.364
Chad Wallach	15	44	4	10	3	0	1	6	0	3	.227	.364
Lewin Díaz	14	39	2	6	2	0	0	3	0	2	.154	.205
Eddy Alvarez	12	37	6	7	1	0	0	2	2	3	.189	.216
Logan Forsythe	12	34	2	4	1	0	1	2	0	4	.118	.235
Jesús Sánchez	10	25	1	1	1	0	0	2	0	4	.040	.080
Isan Díaz	7	22	3	4	0	0	0	1	0	0	.182	.182
Sean Rodriguez	4	13	0	2	0	0	0	0	0	0	.154	.154
Ryan Lavarnway	5	11	0	4	0	0	0	0	0	0	.364	.364
Harold Ramírez	3	10	2	2	0	0	0	1	0	1	.200	.200
Brian Navarreto	2	5	0	2	0	0	0	0	0	0	.400	.400
Team totals	60	1935	263	472	82	5	60	247	51	191	.244	.384

=== Pitching ===
Note: W = Wins; L = Losses; ERA = Earned run average; G = Games pitched; GS = Games started; SV = Saves; IP = Innings pitched; H = Hits allowed; R = Runs allowed; ER = Earned runs allowed; BB = Walks allowed; SO = Strikeouts

Player	W	L	ERA	G	GS	SV	IP	H	R	ER	BB	SO
Pablo López	6	4	3.61	11	11	0	57.1	50	27	23	18	59
Sandy Alcántara	3	2	3.00	7	7	0	42.0	35	22	14	15	39
Sixto Sánchez	3	2	3.46	7	7	0	39.0	36	15	15	11	33
Daniel Castano	1	2	3.03	7	6	0	29.2	30	12	10	11	12
Trevor Rogers	1	2	6.11	7	7	0	28.0	32	20	19	13	39
Josh Smith	1	1	6.84	16	1	1	26.1	33	21	20	11	18
Elieser Hernández	1	0	3.16	6	6	0	25.2	21	10	9	5	34
Brandon Kintzler	2	3	2.22	24	0	12	24.1	21	7	6	11	14
José Ureña	0	3	5.40	5	5	0	23.1	22	15	14	13	15
Nick Vincent	1	2	4.43	21	0	3	22.1	23	11	11	6	17
Brad Boxberger	1	0	3.00	23	0	0	18.0	17	7	6	8	18
Yimi García	3	0	0.60	14	0	1	15.0	9	1	1	5	19
James Hoyt	2	0	1.23	24	0	0	14.2	9	2	2	8	20
Richard Bleier	1	1	2.63	19	0	0	13.2	13	6	4	4	7
Jordan Yamamoto	0	1	18.26	4	3	0	11.1	27	24	23	7	13
Stephen Tarpley	2	2	9.00	12	0	1	11.0	11	12	11	8	11
Robert Dugger	0	0	12.66	4	1	0	10.2	21	16	15	3	4
Ryne Stanek	0	0	7.20	9	0	0	10.0	11	8	8	8	11
Humberto Mejía	0	2	5.40	3	3	0	10.0	13	8	6	6	11
Brandon Leibrandt	0	0	2.00	5	0	0	9.0	3	2	2	7	3
Nick Neidert	0	0	5.40	4	0	0	8.1	10	5	5	2	4
Braxton Garrett	1	1	5.87	2	2	0	7.2	8	6	5	5	8
Justin Shafer	0	0	12.71	5	0	0	5.2	8	8	8	4	5
Sterling Sharp	0	0	10.13	4	0	0	5.1	7	7	6	5	3
Jesús Tinoco	0	0	0.00	3	0	0	5.0	0	0	0	3	3
Pat Venditte	0	0	0.00	3	0	0	4.1	1	0	0	0	5
Alex Vesia	0	1	18.69	5	0	0	4.1	7	10	9	7	5
Mike Morin	1	0	0.00	3	0	0	4.0	1	0	0	1	2
Brian Moran	1	0	12.27	5	0	0	3.2	5	5	5	6	6
Brett Eibner	0	0	13.50	3	0	0	3.1	7	7	5	4	4
Johan Quezada	0	0	9.00	3	0	0	3.0	4	3	3	1	2
Caleb Smith	0	0	3.00	1	1	0	3.0	1	1	1	6	3
Josh Smith	0	0	10.80	2	0	0	1.2	2	2	2	1	4
Jorge Guzmán	0	0	18.00	1	0	0	1.0	2	2	2	1	0
Jeff Brigham	0	0	9.00	1	0	0	1.0	2	1	1	0	0
Logan Forsythe	0	0	9.00	1	0	0	1.0	2	1	1	1	0
Jordan Holloway	0	0	0.00	1	0	0	0.1	2	0	0	1	0
Team totals	31	29	4.86	60	60	18	504.0	506	304	272	226	451

== Farm system ==
Level	Team	League	Manager
AAA	Wichita Wind Surge	Pacific Coast League	
AA	Jacksonville Jumbo Shrimp	Southern League	
A-Advanced	Jupiter Hammerheads	Florida State League	
A	Clinton LumberKings	Midwest League	
A-Short Season	Batavia Muckdogs	New York–Penn League	
Rookie	GCL Marlins	Gulf Coast League	
Rookie	DSL Marlins	Dominican Summer League	
