= Isan Díaz =

Puerto Rican baseball player (born 1996)

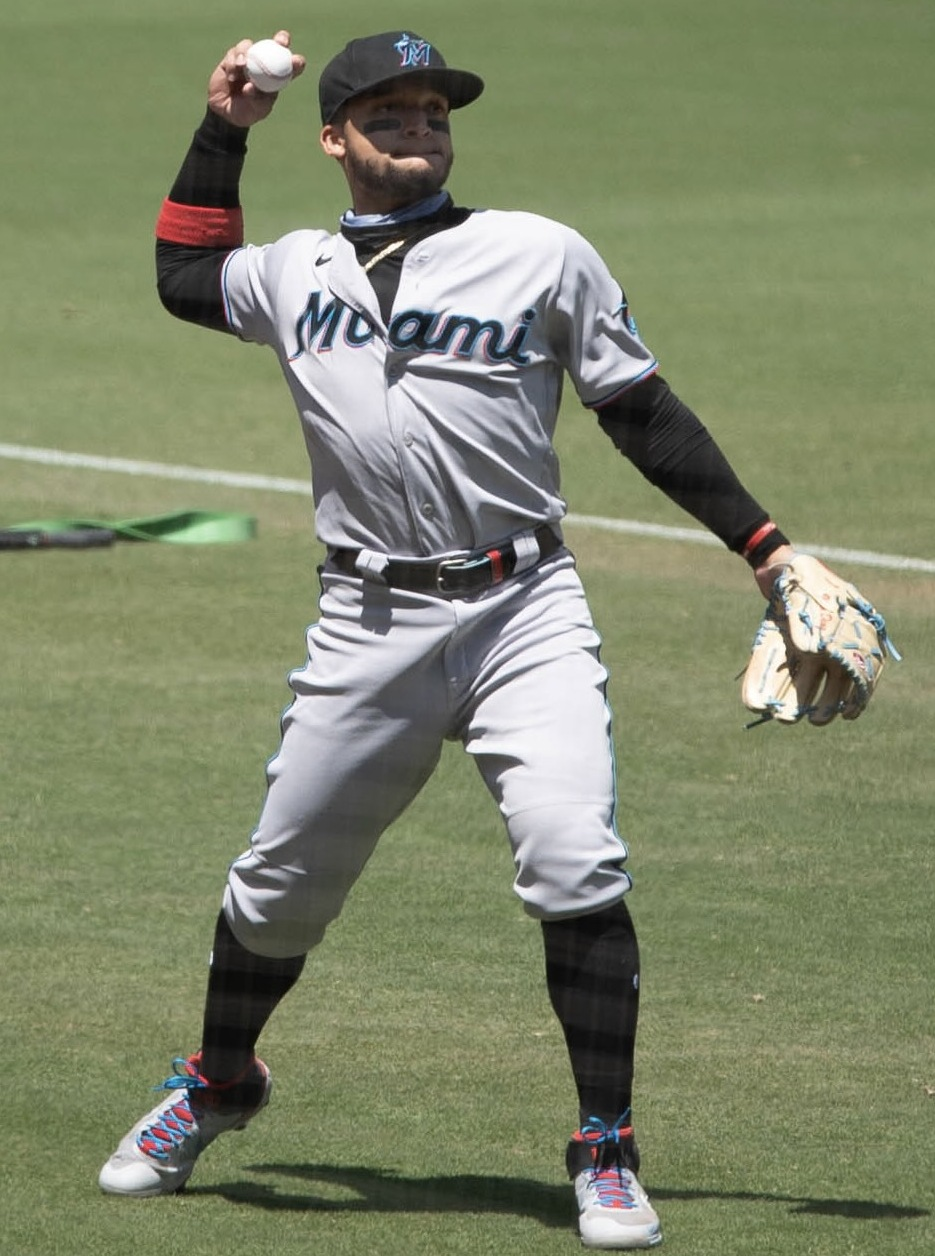
- Díaz with the Miami Marlins in 2021

Algodoneros de Unión Laguna – No. 1
- Second baseman
- Born: May 27, 1996 (age 30); Bayamón, Puerto Rico
- Bats: Left Throws: Right

MLB debut
- August 5, 2019, for the Miami Marlins

MLB statistics (through 2023 season)
- Batting average: .177
- Home runs: 9
- Runs batted in: 42
- Stats at Baseball Reference

Teams
- Miami Marlins (2019–2021); San Francisco Giants (2023); Detroit Tigers (2023)

Isan Xavier Díaz (born May 27, 1996) is a Puerto Rican professional baseball second baseman for the Algodoneros de Unión Laguna of the Mexican League. He has previously played in Major League Baseball (MLB) for the Miami Marlins, San Francisco Giants, and Detroit Tigers.

The Arizona Diamondbacks selected Díaz in the second round of the 2014 MLB draft. He made his MLB debut with the Marlins in 2019 and played for them until 2021.

== Early life ==
Díaz is originally from Puerto Rico, but his family moved to Springfield, Massachusetts, when he was four years old. His father, Raul, played college baseball and instructed Isan as a child.

Díaz attended Springfield Central High School in Springfield. He committed to attend Vanderbilt University to play college baseball for the Vanderbilt Commodores.

== Professional career ==
=== Arizona Diamondbacks ===
The Arizona Diamondbacks selected Díaz in the second round, with the 70th overall selection, of the 2014 Major League Baseball draft. Díaz signed with the Diamondbacks for a signing bonus of $750,000, rather than enroll at Vanderbilt. They assigned him to the Arizona League Diamondbacks in the Rookie-level Arizona League, where he posted a .187 average with three home runs and 21 RBI in 49 games.

In 2015, Díaz played for the Missoula Osprey of the Rookie-level Pioneer League. He was named the Diamondbacks' Minor League Player of the Month for July, a mid-season and post-season Pioneer League All Star, and Most Valuable Player of the Pioneer League at the end of the season after leading the league with 25 doubles and batting .360(8th in the league)/.436(7th)/.640(2nd) in 272 at bats with 58 runs (2nd), 6 triple (5th), 13 home runs (2nd), 51 RBI (3rd), 12 stolen bases, 34 walks (7th), and a 1.076 OPS (2nd) in 68 games. MiLB.com named Diaz the Diamondbacks' Organization All-Star at shortstop, and Baseball America named him a Rookie All Star.

=== Milwaukee Brewers ===
On January 30, 2016, the Diamondbacks traded Díaz to the Milwaukee Brewers along with Chase Anderson, Aaron Hill, and cash considerations for Jean Segura and Tyler Wagner. Díaz spent the 2016 season with the Wisconsin Timber Rattlers of the Single-A Midwest League, where he hit .264 with a career high 20 home runs and 75 RBI in 135 games. He won the Brewers' organization's Minor League Player of the Year Award. He was also selected to play in the Arizona Fall League.

Díaz spent the 2017 season playing for the Carolina Mudcats of the High-A Carolina League where he struggled, batting only .222 with 13 home runs and 54 RBI in 110 games.

=== Miami Marlins ===
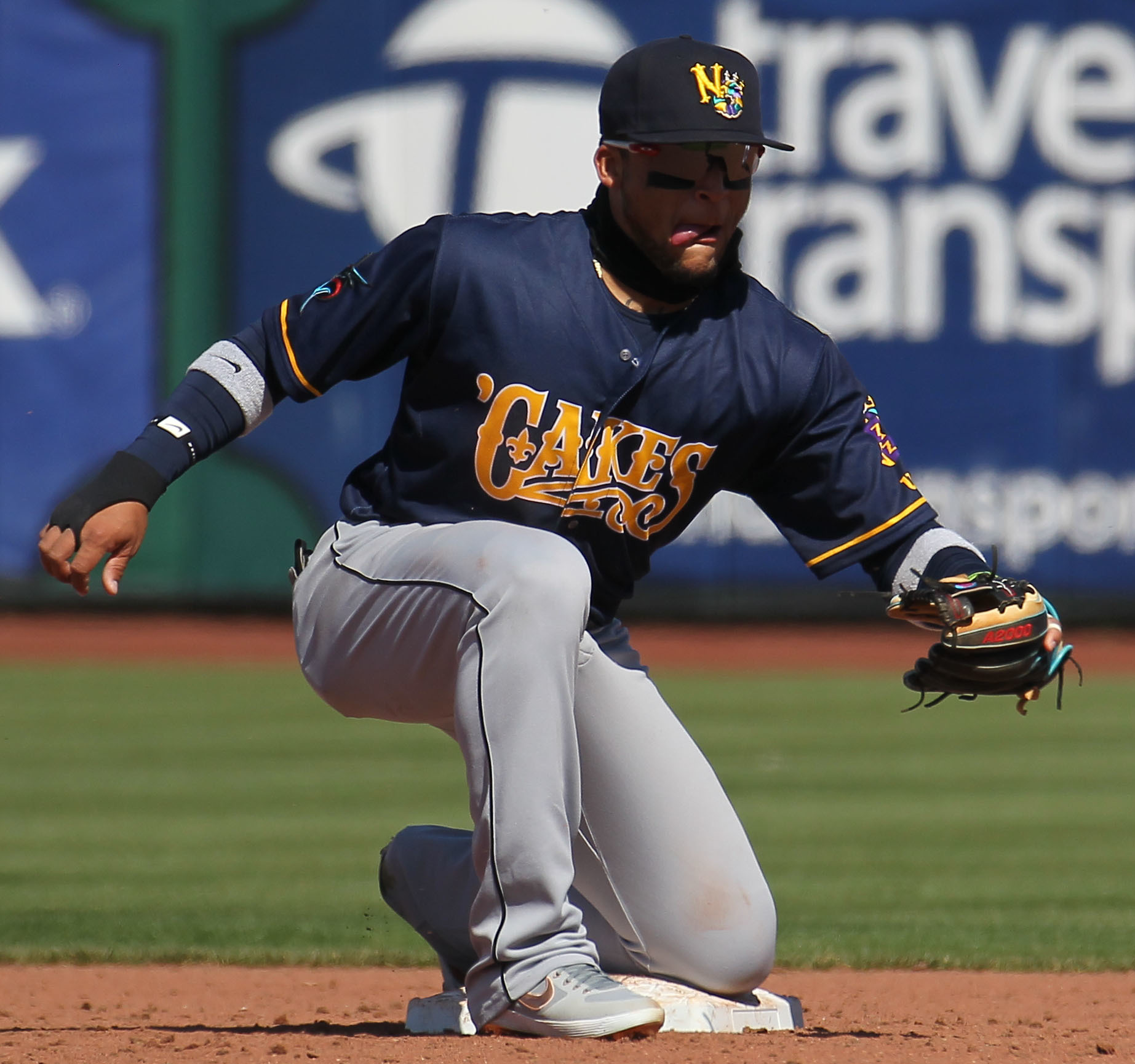
Díaz with the New Orleans Baby Cakes in 2019

On January 25, 2018, the Brewers traded Díaz to the Miami Marlins, along with Lewis Brinson, Monte Harrison, and Jordan Yamamoto for Christian Yelich. MLB.com ranked him as Miami's eighth best prospect going into the 2018 season. Diaz began the season with Jacksonville Jumbo Shrimp of the Double-A Southern League and was promoted to the New Orleans Baby Cakes of the Triple-A Pacific Coast League in July. In 119 games between the two teams, he slashed .232/.340/.399 with 13 home runs, 56 RBI, and 14 stolen bases.

On November 20, 2018, the Marlins added Díaz to their 40-man roster to protect him from the Rule 5 draft. He opened the 2019 season back with New Orleans. He set a franchise record by hitting home runs in five consecutive games in May 2019. Díaz was named to the 2019 All-Star Futures Game. Over 102 games with New Orleans, he batted .305/.395/.578 with 26 home runs and 70 RBI, while playing second base.

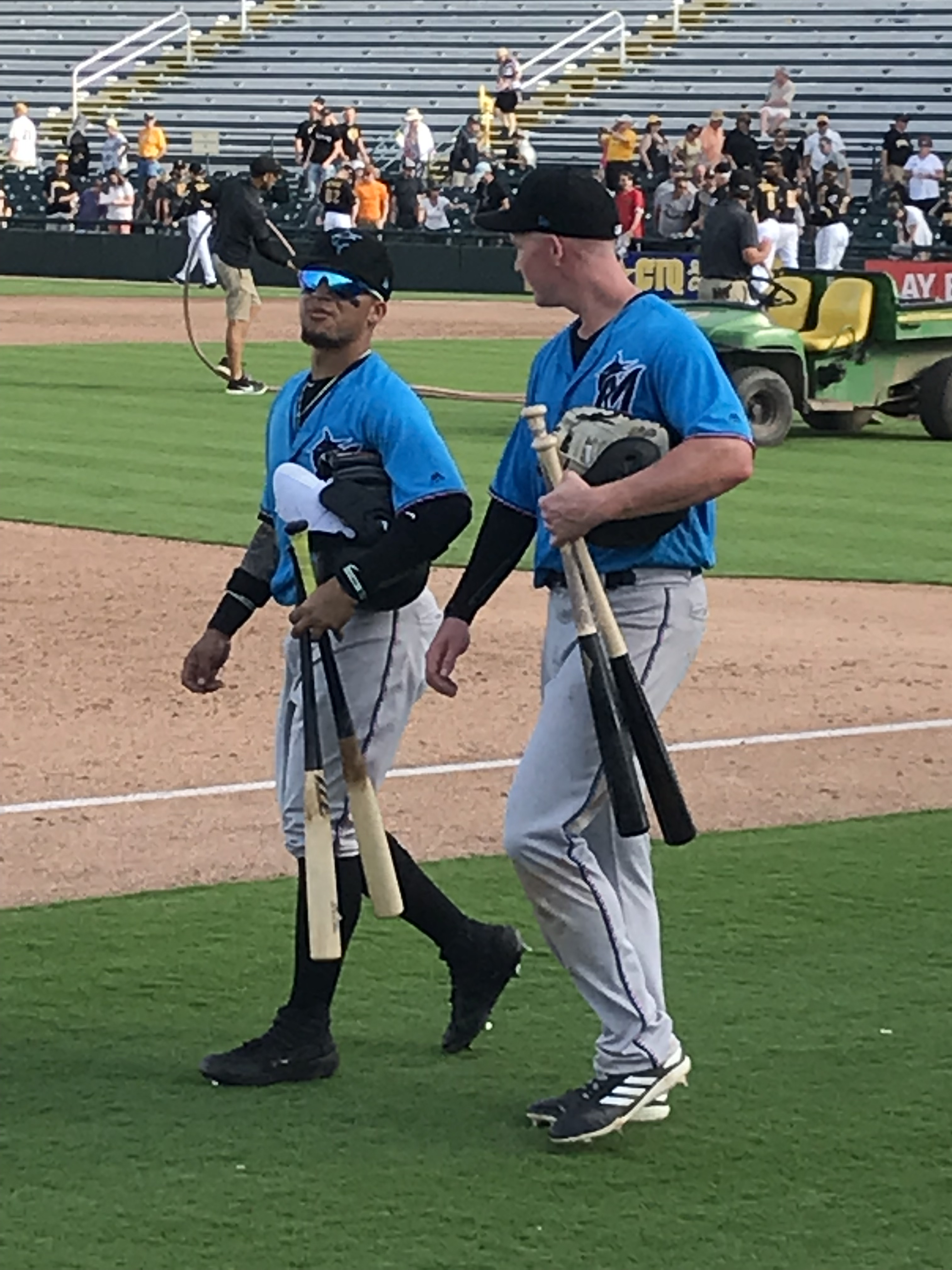
Díaz with Garrett Cooper during spring training in 2019

The Marlins promoted Díaz to the major leagues on August 5, 2019. In his major league debut that day, he hit a home run off New York Mets pitcher Jacob deGrom. In 49 games with Miami, he batted .173 with five home runs and 23 RBI.

After playing two games at the start of the shortened 2020 season, Díaz opted out of the remainder of the season on August 1, due to the Marlins' COVID-19 outbreak. However, Díaz reversed his decision in September and was cleared to rejoin the Marlins. After five games in the month of September, Díaz suffered a left groin strain and was placed on the 60-day injured list.

Díaz began the 2021 season at the Marlins alternative training site after losing the starting second baseman role to Jazz Chisholm. On April 28, 2021, Díaz was recalled from the alternate training site. Díaz hit his first career grand slam on May 8, off Milwaukee Brewers reliever Patrick Weigel.

Díaz was designated for assignment on March 22, 2022. He cleared waivers and was sent outright to Triple-A Jacksonville on March 29.

=== San Francisco Giants ===
On April 30, 2022, the Marlins traded Díaz to the San Francisco Giants for a player to be named later or cash considerations. In 2022, with the Triple-A Sacramento River Cats, he batted .275/.377/.574 in 284 at bats, with 23 home runs (9th in the Pacific Coast League) and 61 RBI.

On November 9, 2022, the Giants added Díaz to their 40-man roster. Díaz was optioned to Sacramento to begin the 2023 season. The Giants promoted Díaz to the major leagues on June 23. He batted 1-for-19 with two walks in six games for the Giants.

=== Detroit Tigers ===
On August 7, 2023, Díaz was claimed off waivers by the Detroit Tigers and optioned to the Triple-A Toledo Mud Hens. On August 13, the Tigers recalled Díaz to replace Javier Báez, who was placed on the bereavement list. He appeared in two games for Detroit, going hitless in 5 at-bats. On August 27, Díaz was removed from the 40-man roster and sent outright to Toledo. The next day, Díaz elected free agency in lieu of an outright assignment.

=== Lancaster Stormers ===
On April 8, 2024, Díaz signed with the Lancaster Stormers of the Atlantic League of Professional Baseball. In 73 games for Lancaster, he batted .304/.381/.571 with 17 home runs, 64 RBI, and nine stolen bases. Díaz became a free agent following the season.

=== Algodoneros de Unión Laguna ===
On January 5, 2025, Díaz signed with the Algodoneros de Unión Laguna of the Mexican League. In 56 appearances for Unión Laguna, Díaz slashed .267/.372/.530 with 13 home runs, 49 RBI, and four stolen bases.

=== Kansas City Royals ===
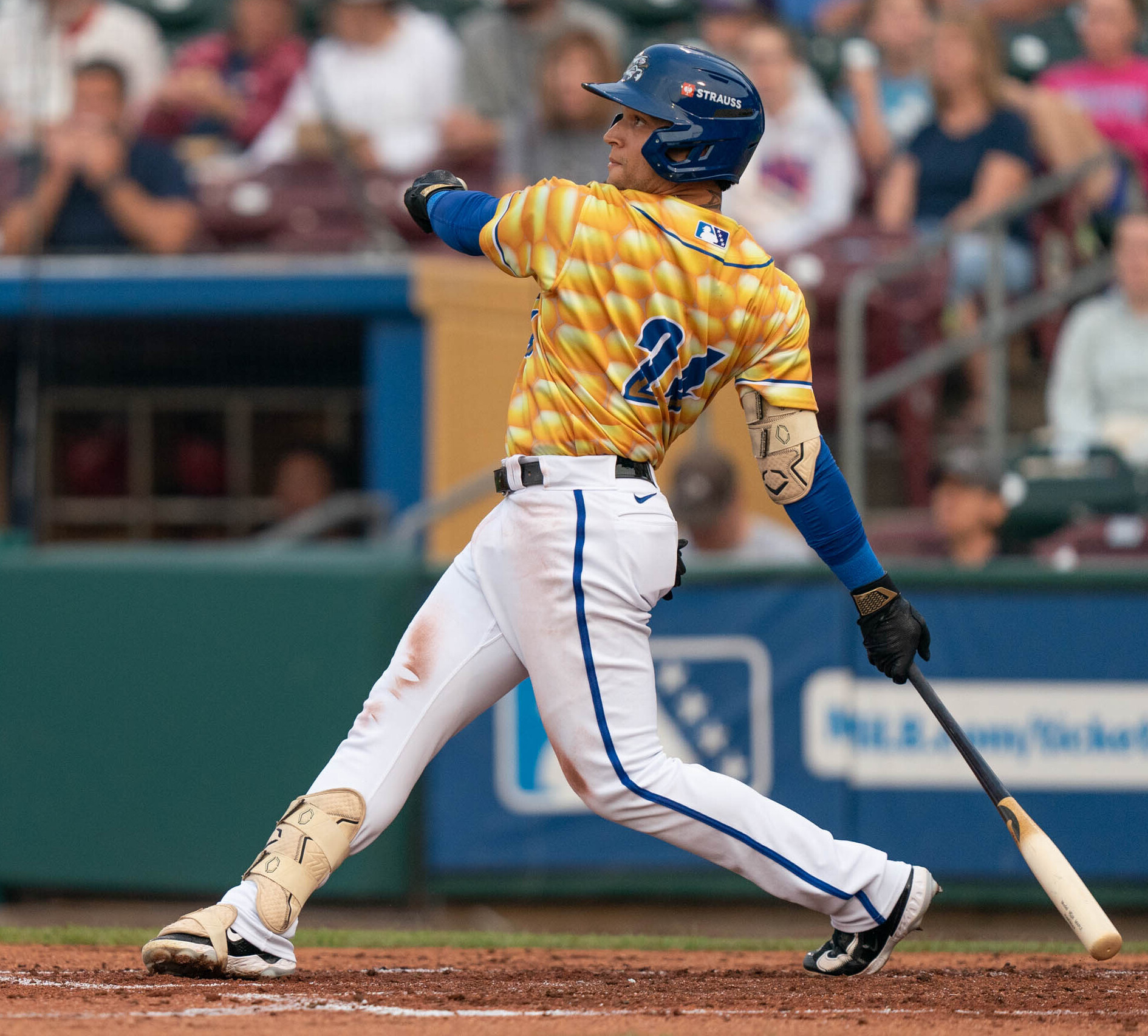
Díaz with the Omaha Storm Chasers in 2025

On July 4, 2025, Díaz signed a minor league contract with the Kansas City Royals. He made 55 appearances split between the Double-A Northwest Arkansas Naturals and Triple-A Omaha Storm Chasers, batting a cumulative .228/.336/.418 with 11 home runs and 30 RBI. Díaz elected free agency following the season on November 6.

=== Algodoneros de Unión Laguna (second stint) ===
On March 9, 2026, Diaz signed with the Algodoneros de Unión Laguna of the Mexican League.
