= Daniel Castano =

American baseball player (born 1994)

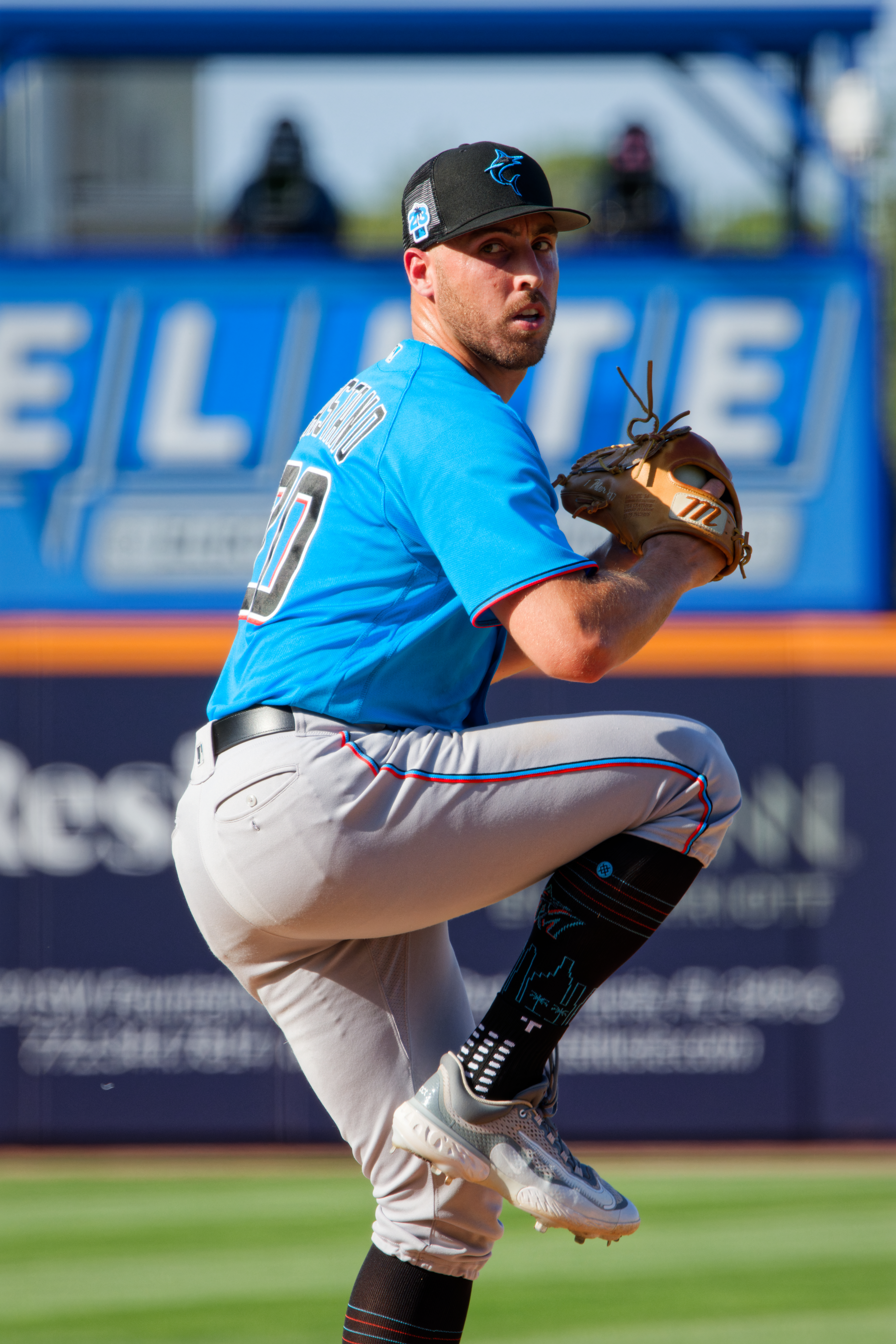
- Castano with the Marlins in 2023
- Pitcher
- Born: September 17, 1994 (age 32); Orlando, Florida, U.S.
- Batted: Left Threw: Left

Professional debut
- MLB: August 8, 2020, for the Miami Marlins
- KBO: March 26, 2024, for the NC Dinos

Last appearance
- MLB: September 11, 2023, for the Miami Marlins
- KBO: July 23, 2024, for the NC Dinos

MLB statistics
- Win–loss record: 2–7
- Earned run average: 4.47
- Strikeouts: 49

KBO statistics
- Win–loss record: 8–6
- Earned run average: 4.35
- Strikeouts: 89
- Stats at Baseball Reference

Teams
- Miami Marlins (2020–2023); NC Dinos (2024)

Daniel Alexander Castano (born September 17, 1994) is an American former professional baseball pitcher. He played in Major League Baseball (MLB) for the Miami Marlins and in the KBO League for the NC Dinos.

== Amateur career ==
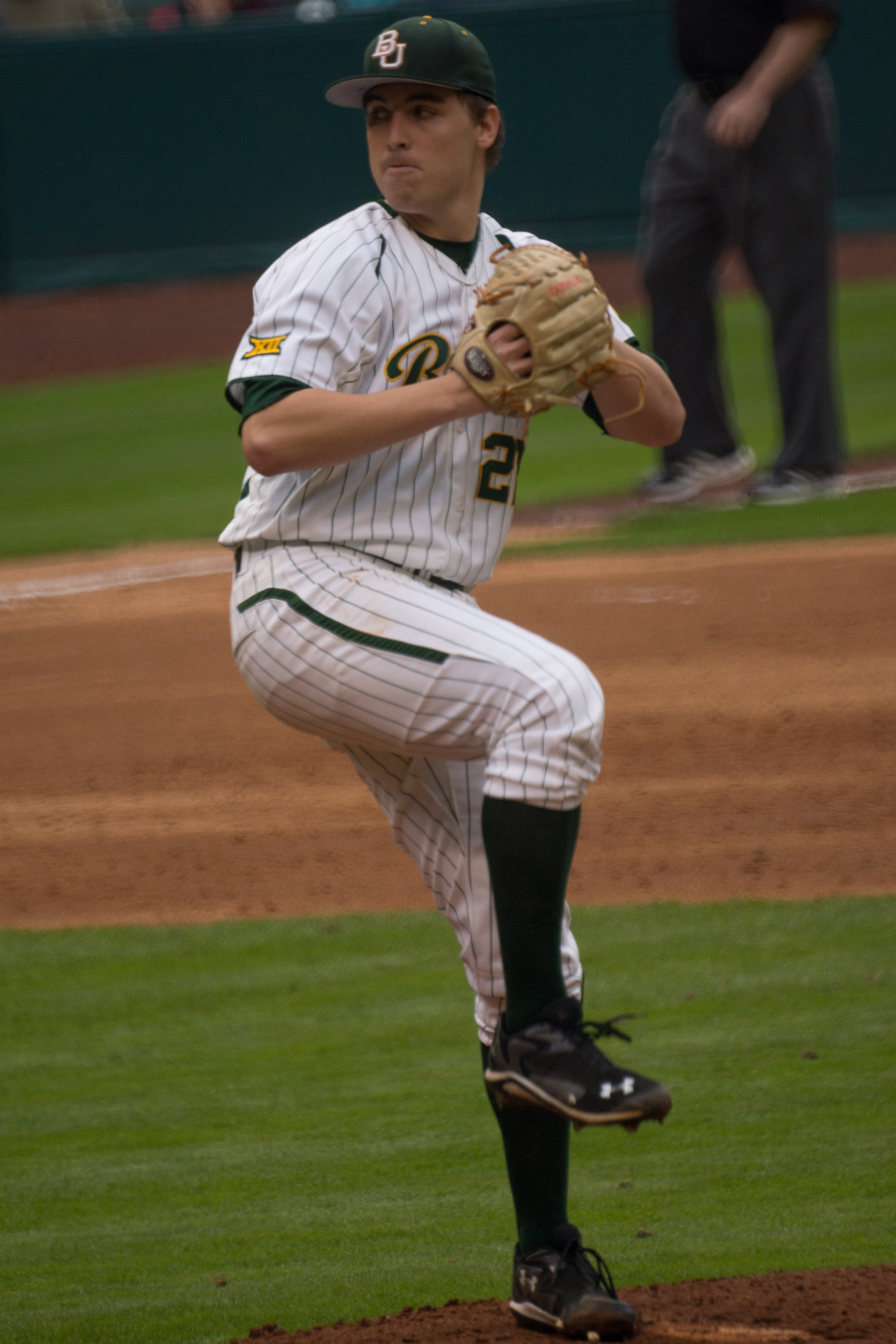
Castano with Baylor in 2015

Castano attended Lake Travis High School in Austin, Texas. During his senior year, he posted a 6–3 record with a 1.03 ERA over 67 2/3 innings over 11 appearances. He was also named District MVP along with Team MVP. After graduating from Lake Travis, Castano enrolled at Baylor University where he played three years of college baseball for the Baylor Bears. In 2015, he played collegiate summer baseball with the Chatham Anglers of the Cape Cod Baseball League. In 2016, his junior year, he pitched to a 4–5 record with a 4.64 ERA in 14 games started for Baylor.

== Professional career ==
=== St. Louis Cardinals ===
After the season, the St. Louis Cardinals selected Castano in the 19th round of the 2016 Major League Baseball draft. He signed with St. Louis and was assigned to the Johnson City Cardinals.

Castano spent all of 2016, his first professional season, with Johnson City, posting a 6.19 ERA along with a 2–5 record in 12 games (11 starts). In 2017, he played for the State College Spikes, where he greatly improved, pitching to a 9–3 record and a 2.57 ERA over 14 starts, earning New York-Penn League All-Star honors.

=== Miami Marlins ===
On December 13, 2017, the Cardinals traded Castano, Sandy Alcántara, Magneuris Sierra and Zac Gallen to the Miami Marlins in exchange for outfielder Marcell Ozuna. He began the 2018 season with the Jupiter Hammerheads, and also spent time with the Gulf Coast Marlins and the Greensboro Grasshoppers during the year. Over 24 games (23 starts) between the three teams, he went 9–12 with a 3.93 ERA. He returned to Jupiter to begin 2019 and was promoted to the Jacksonville Jumbo Shrimp in May. Over thirty games (11 starts) between the two clubs, Castano pitched to a 7–4 record with a 3.48 ERA, striking out 104 batters over 119 innings.

On August 8, 2020, Castano made his MLB debut against the New York Mets, giving up 4 earned runs over 4.1 innings. He finished his rookie season with a 1–2 record and 3.03 ERA in 7 appearances.

On July 9, 2021, Castano was placed on the 60-day injured list with a left shoulder impingement. On the year, he only made 5 appearances (4 starts), posting an 0–2 record and 4.87 ERA with 13 strikeouts in 20.1 innings pitched. In 2022, Castano appeared in 10 games for Miami (7 starts), and pitched to a 1–3 record and 4.04 ERA with 20 strikeouts in 35.1 innings of work.

On January 19, 2023, Castano was designated for assignment by the Marlins after the signing of Johnny Cueto was made official. On January 26, Castano cleared waivers and was sent outright to the Triple-A Jacksonville Jumbo Shrimp. On April 4, Castano had his contract selected back to the 40-man and active rosters. After only one appearances for Miami, he was removed from the roster and sent outright to Triple-A Jacksonville Jumbo Shrimp on June 23. On September 10, Castano was selected back to the major league roster. The following day, he allowed five runs in two innings pitched against the Milwaukee Brewers. Castano was again designated for assignment on September 12. He again cleared waivers and was sent outright to Jacksonville on September 14. On October 10, Castano elected free agency.

=== NC Dinos ===
On December 13, 2023, Castano signed a one-year, $850,000 contract with the NC Dinos of the KBO League. In 19 starts for the Dinos in 2024, he compiled an 8–6 record and 4.35 ERA with 89 strikeouts across 111 2/3 innings pitched. Castano was released by the team on July 31, 2024.

Castano announced his retirement from professional baseball on September 3, 2024.

== Personal life ==
Castano is a Christian. Castano is married to Brooke Castano. They have two sons together.
