= Johan Quezada =

Dominican baseball player (born 1994)

Free agent
- Pitcher
- Born: August 25, 1994 (age 32); Santo Domingo, Dominican Republic
- Bats: Right Throws: Right

MLB debut
- September 12, 2020, for the Miami Marlins

MLB statistics (through 2023 season)
- Win–loss record: 0–0
- Earned run average: 14.73
- Strikeouts: 2
- Stats at Baseball Reference

Teams
- Miami Marlins (2020, 2023)

Johan Ramon Quezada (born August 25, 1994) is a Dominican professional baseball pitcher who is a free agent. He has previously played in Major League Baseball (MLB) for the Miami Marlins.

== Career ==
=== Minnesota Twins ===
On September 10, 2012, Quezada signed a minor league contract with the Minnesota Twins. He would spend the next 7 seasons in the Twins minor league system, playing for the DSL Twins in 2013 and 2014, the GCL Twins in 2015, the Elizabethton Twins in 2016–2018, and the Single-A Cedar Rapids Kernels in 2018.

Quezada spent the 2019 campaign with the High–A Fort Myers Miracle, making 33 relief outings and logging a 7–2 record and 3.44 ERA with 49 strikeouts across 52 1/3 innings pitched. He elected free agency following the season on November 4, 2019.

=== Miami Marlins ===
On December 18, 2019, Quezada signed a minor league contract with the Miami Marlins organization. The Marlins promoted him to the major leagues on September 11, 2020. He made his major league debut on September 12 against the Philadelphia Phillies.

=== St. Louis Cardinals ===
The Philadelphia Phillies claimed Quezada off of waivers on October 30, 2020. On February 10, 2021, the St. Louis Cardinals acquired Quezada from the Phillies in exchange for cash considerations. Quezada spent the entire 2021 season split between three minor league affiliates: the rookie-level Florida Complex League Cardinals, Double-A Springfield Cardinals, and Triple-A Memphis Redbirds. In 18 total appearances between the three clubs, Quezada struggled to a 6.38 ERA with 28 strikeouts in 24 innings pitched.

On March 29, 2022, Quezada was designated for assignment by the Cardinals following the signing of Albert Pujols. On March 30, Quezada was sent outright to Double-A Springfield. He made 44 appearances split between the FCL Cardinals, Springfield, and Memphis in 2022, posting a 2–1 record and 4.83 ERA with 73 strikeouts in 59 2/3 innings pitched. Quezada elected free agency following the season on November 10.

=== Miami Marlins (second stint) ===
On February 3, 2023, Quezada signed a minor league contract with the Miami Marlins organization. He made one start for the Double-A Pensacola Blue Wahoos before being promoted to the Triple-A Jacksonville Jumbo Shrimp. He made 4 appearances for Jacksonville, posting a 2–0 record and 2.70 ERA with 8 strikeouts in 6.2 innings pitched. On April 28, Quezada had his contract selected to the active roster. He made one appearance for Miami, surrendering 3 runs and allowing 5 walks in 0.2 innings of work against the Atlanta Braves. Quezada was designated for assignment on May 3 after Devin Smeltzer was added to the roster. He cleared waivers and was sent outright to Triple-A Jacksonville on May 5. Quezada elected free agency on October 11.

=== Guerreros de Oaxaca ===
On May 16, 2024, Quezada signed with the Guerreros de Oaxaca of the Mexican League. In 22 games (1 start) for Oaxaca, he struggled to an 0–2 record and 9.00 ERA with 15 strikeouts over 20 innings pitched.

In one appearance for Oaxaca in 2025, Quezada did not record an out while giving up three walks and giving up two earned runs. He was released by the Guerreros on April 21, 2025.
