= Lewis Brinson =

American baseball player (born 1994)

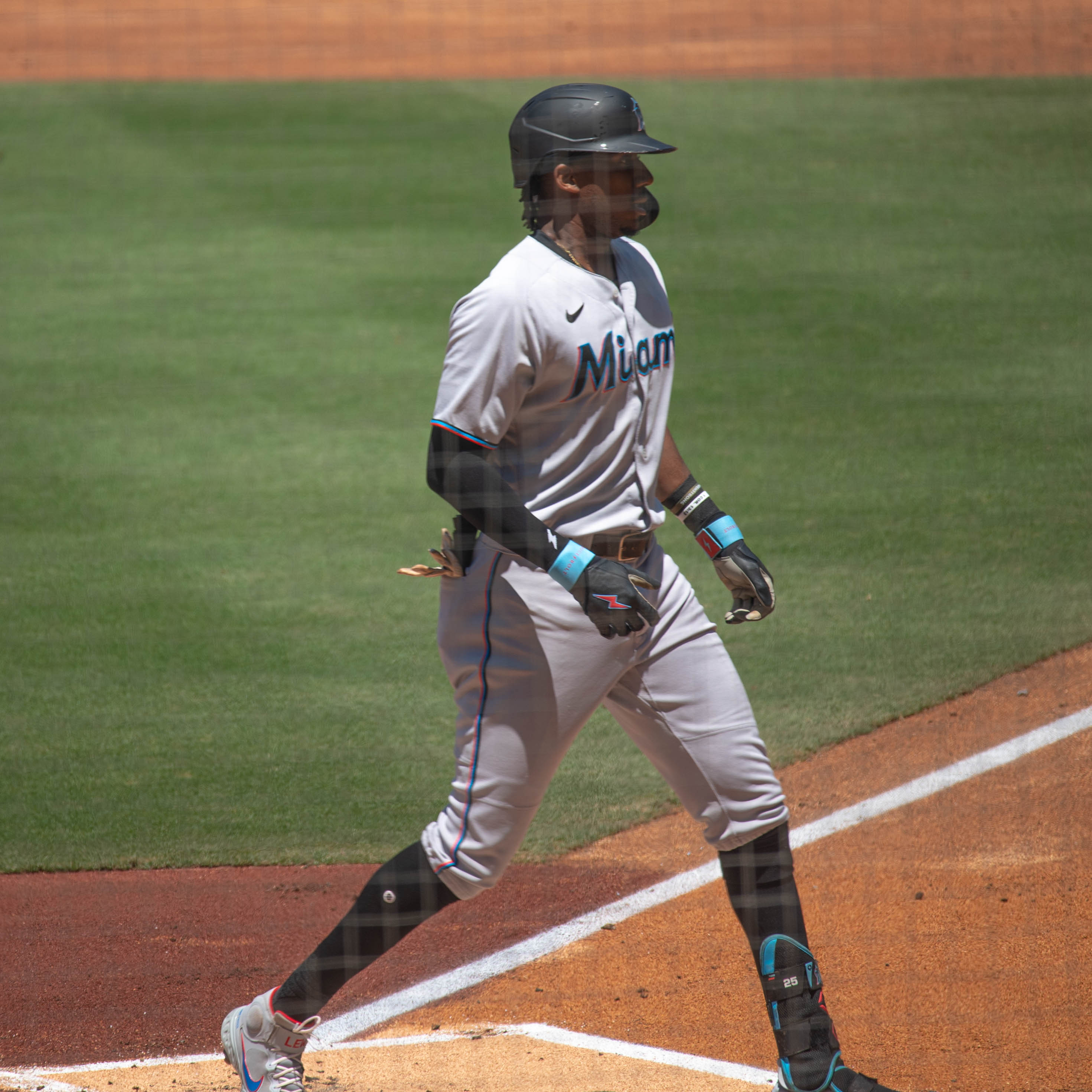
- Brinson with the Marlins in 2021
- Outfielder
- Born: May 8, 1994 (age 32); Fort Lauderdale, Florida, U.S.
- Batted: Right Threw: Right

Professional debut
- MLB: June 11, 2017, for the Milwaukee Brewers
- NPB: March 31, 2023, for the Yomiuri Giants

Last appearance
- MLB: September 20, 2022, for the San Francisco Giants
- NPB: September 26, 2023, for the Yomiuri Giants

MLB statistics
- Batting average: .198
- Home runs: 28
- Runs batted in: 109

NPB statistics
- Batting average: .248
- Home runs: 11
- Runs batted in: 35
- Stats at Baseball Reference

Teams
- Milwaukee Brewers (2017); Miami Marlins (2018–2021); San Francisco Giants (2022); Yomiuri Giants (2023)

Lewis Lamont Brinson (born May 8, 1994) is an American former professional baseball outfielder. He played in Major League Baseball (MLB) for the Milwaukee Brewers, Miami Marlins and San Francisco Giants, and in Nippon Professional Baseball (NPB) for the Yomiuri Giants. The Texas Rangers selected Brinson in the first round of the 2012 Major League Baseball draft.

== Early life ==
Lewis Brinson grew up in South Florida. As a child, he aspired to play baseball for the Florida Marlins. Brinson attended Coral Springs High School in Coral Springs, Florida. In the summer before his senior year, he won a home run derby for prospects at Wrigley Field. He initially committed to play college baseball for the Florida Gators of the University of Florida.

== Career ==
=== Texas Rangers ===
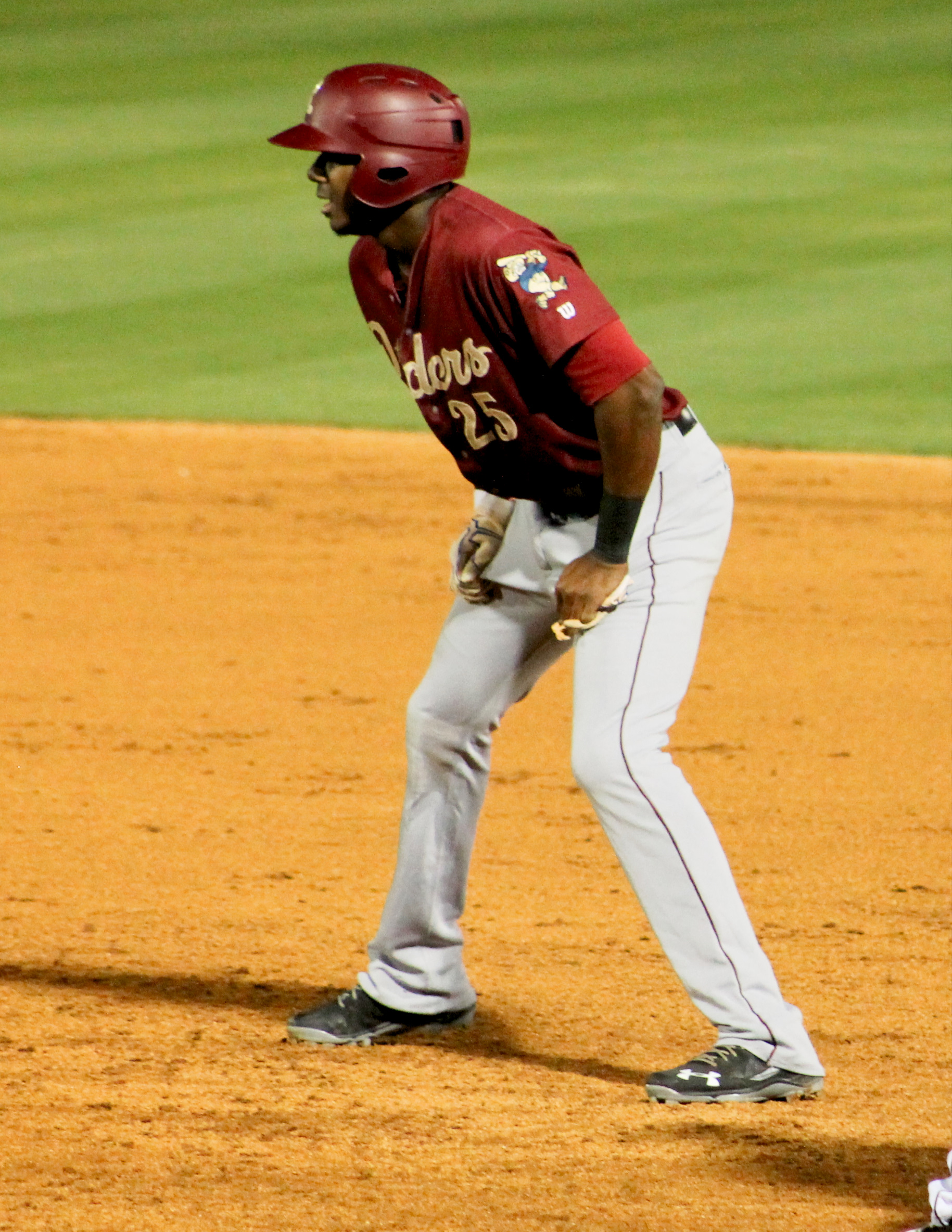
Brinson with the Frisco RoughRiders in 2016

The Texas Rangers selected Brinson in the first round of the 2012 Major League Baseball draft. He signed with the Rangers, receiving a $1.625 million signing bonus, and made his professional debut with the Arizona League Rangers, hitting .283/.345/.523 with seven home runs over 237 at-bats in 54 games.

Brinson spent 2013 with the Hickory Crawdads of the Single–A South Atlantic League, hitting .237/.322/.427 with 21 home runs. He started 2014 with Hickory before being promoted to the Myrtle Beach Pelicans. In 347 at-bats over 89 games, he hit .288/.354/.458 with 13 home runs. Brinson started 2015 with the High Desert Mavericks of the High–A California League and was promoted to the Frisco RoughRiders of the Double-A Texas League and Round Rock Express of the Triple-A Pacific Coast League (PCL) during the season. In 100 games over the three levels, he hit .332/.403/.601 with 20 home runs. After the season, he played in the Arizona Fall League. Brinson was invited to spring training by the Rangers in 2016. He began the season in Frisco.

=== Milwaukee Brewers ===
On August 1, 2016, the Rangers traded Brinson, Luis Ortiz, and a player to be named later, Ryan Cordell to the Milwaukee Brewers for Jonathan Lucroy and Jeremy Jeffress. The Brewers assigned Brinson to the Colorado Springs Sky Sox of the PCL. He finished the 2016 season with a .268 batting average, 15 homers and 61 RBI. The Brewers added him to their 40-man roster after the season, in order to protect him from the Rule 5 draft.

Brinson began the 2017 season with Colorado Springs. The Brewers promoted him to the major leagues on June 10. In 21 games, Brinson hit two home runs and batted .106. In 2017 in the PCL he batted .331/.400/.562.

=== Miami Marlins ===
On January 25, 2018, the Brewers traded Brinson, Isan Díaz, Monte Harrison, and Jordan Yamamoto to the Miami Marlins for Christian Yelich. MLB.com ranked Brinson as Miami's top prospect going into the 2018 season. On March 25, 2018, the Marlins announced that Brinson had made the Opening Day roster. In 382 at bats with Miami he hit .199/.240/.338.

He was demoted to Triple–A on April 30, 2019, and promoted back to the major leagues on August 5. In 2019 in the PCL he batted .270/.361/.510.

During the pandemic-shortened 2020 MLB season, Brinson hit over .200 for the first time in his major league career, hitting .226/.268/.368 with three home runs and 12 RBIs in 47 games. Brinson additionally made his first appearance in the postseason, where he was hitless in six at-bats.

Brinson again made the Marlins' Opening Day roster in 2021. In August 2021, Brinson claimed to have been called "nigger" by a fan at Coors Field. A subsequent investigation by MLB found that the fan was trying to get the attention of the Rockies' mascot, "Dinger", for his grandchildren. The Marlins designated Brinson for assignment after the 2021 season. He was non-tendered on November 30, making him a free agent.

=== Houston Astros ===
On March 12, 2022, Brinson signed a minor league contract with the Houston Astros. Over 85 games, he batted .299/356/.574 with 22 home runs for the Triple-A Sugar Land Space Cowboys of the Pacific Coast League.

=== San Francisco Giants ===
On September 1, 2022, the Astros traded Brinson to the San Francisco Giants for an undisclosed return. He was selected to the Giants' major league roster the same day. On September 21, Brinson was designated for assignment after batting .167/.211/.472 in 16 games with the Giants. He cleared waivers and was sent outright to the Triple–A Sacramento River Cats on September 24. Brinson elected free agency following the season on October 6.

=== Yomiuri Giants ===
On January 12, 2023, Brinson signed with the Yomiuri Giants of Nippon Professional Baseball (NPB). In 88 games for Yomiuri, he batted .248/.272/.422 with 11 home runs and 35 RBI. On November 27, the Giants announced that Brinson would not be returning to the team the following year.

=== Olmecas de Tabasco ===
On April 30, 2024, Brinson signed with the Olmecas de Tabasco of the Mexican League. In 13 games, he batted .143/.250/.238 with three hits and four RBI.

=== Rieleros de Aguascalientes ===
On May 26, 2024, Brinson was traded to the Rieleros de Aguascalientes of the Mexican League. In 3 games for Aguascalientes, he went 1–for–7 (.143) before being placed on the reserve list on June 7, where he spent the rest of the season. Brinson became a free agent following the season.
