= Magneuris Sierra =

Dominican baseball player (born 1996)

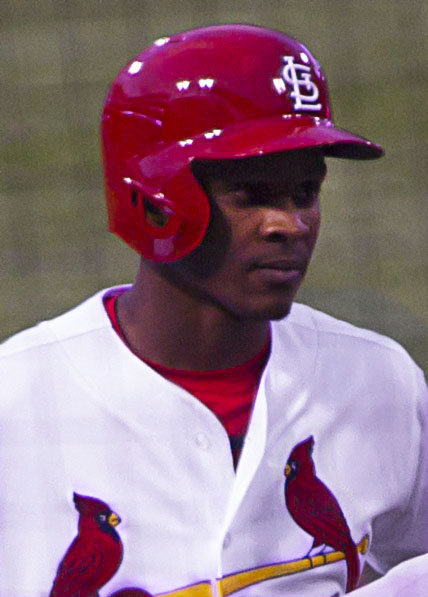
- Sierra with the St. Louis Cardinals in 2017

Acereros de Monclova – No. 82
- Outfielder
- Born: April 7, 1996 (age 30); San Cristóbal, Dominican Republic
- Bats: Left Throws: Left

MLB debut
- May 7, 2017, for the St. Louis Cardinals

MLB statistics (through 2022 season)
- Batting average: .228
- Home runs: 0
- Runs batted in: 30
- Stats at Baseball Reference

Teams
- St. Louis Cardinals (2017); Miami Marlins (2018–2021); Los Angeles Angels (2022)

Magneuris Sierra (born April 7, 1996) is a Dominican professional baseball outfielder for the Acereros de Monclova of the Mexican League. He has previously played in Major League Baseball (MLB) for the St. Louis Cardinals, Miami Marlins and Los Angeles Angels. The Cardinals signed him as an international free agent in 2012 and he made his major league debut on May 7, 2017. In 2014, he was the Cardinals Minor League Player of the Year after batting .386 with a .939 on-base plus slugging percentage (OPS).

== Career ==
=== St. Louis Cardinals ===
Sierra signed with the St. Louis Cardinals as an international free agent in 2012. He made his professional debut in 2013 with the Dominican Summer League Cardinals. In 2014, he played for the Gulf Coast Cardinals and was named the Cardinals Minor League Player of the Year after hitting .386 with two home runs and a .939 OPS. Prior to the 2016 season, Baseball America ranked him as the sixth-best prospect in the Cardinals' system. He spent the 2016 season with the Peoria Chiefs of the Single–A Midwest League, where he hit .307 with three home runs, 60 runs batted in (RBI) and 31 stolen bases. On November 19, 2016, the Cardinals added Sierra to their 40-man roster to protect him from being chosen in the Rule 5 draft.

Sierra started the 2017 season with the Palm Beach Cardinals of the High–A Florida State League. Because of injuries to José Martínez, Stephen Piscotty, and Dexter Fowler, the Cardinals called Sierra up to the majors on May 7, 2017, and started him in center field the same day in a 6−4 extra innings victory versus the Atlanta Braves. His first major league hit was a single in the sixth inning of his debut versus starting pitcher R. A. Dickey. After hitting safely in each of his seven games played (11-for-30), batting .367/.406/.367 with a .773 OPS and eight runs scored, the Cardinals optioned Sierra to the Springfield Cardinals of the Double–A Texas League. After his July 15 recall, he became the first Cardinals' player to hit safely in all of his first nine games (July 16).

=== Miami Marlins ===
On December 14, 2017, the Cardinals traded Sierra, along with Sandy Alcántara, Zac Gallen, and Daniel Castano, to the Miami Marlins for Marcell Ozuna. MLB.com ranked Sierra as Miami's seventh best prospect going into the 2018 season.

He began 2018 with the New Orleans Baby Cakes, for whom he batted .260/.287/.341 in 346 at bats. With the Marlins, he batted .190/.222/.211 in 147 at bats, and stole three bases in five attempts. He came in third to Minnesota Twins outfielder Byron Buxton and Philadelphia Phillies outfielder Roman Quinn in 2018 of all MLB players in average sprint speed, at 30.2 feet per second.

Sierra spent most of the 2019 season split between the Triple-A New Orleans Baby Cakes and the Double-A Jacksonville Jumbo Shrimp, but did appear in 15 major league games, notching a .350/.381/.425 batting line with 1 RBI. In 19 games for the Marlins in 2020, Sierra slashed .250/.333/.364 with 7 RBI in 44 at-bats.

In 2021, Sierra played in a career-high 123 games (only 43 of which he started) and batted .230/.281/.268 in 225 plate appearances. On November 3, 2021, Sierra was outrighted off of the 40-man roster. Sierra became a free agent following the 2021 season.

=== Los Angeles Angels ===
On January 13, 2022, Sierra signed a minor league contract with the Los Angeles Angels. He had his contract selected on July 24.

In the second inning of a game against the Seattle Mariners on August 5, Sierra nearly hit his first career home run, when he tried to stretch a triple into an inside-the-park home run and was barely thrown out at home. He would go on to score the decisive run on a Taylor Ward sacrifice fly in the tenth inning as the Angels won 4–3.

In a game against the Oakland Athletics on August 10, Sierra hit an RBI single in the 10th inning, then an RBI double in the 12th inning, putting the Angels on top 5–4 to win and sweep the series.

In a game on August 14, Sierra was once again thrown out at home trying for his first home run, which would have been a walk-off three-run inside-the-park home run, in the ninth inning. He would later express frustration about being so close but missing out on the potential walk-off home run, saying, "I've always dreamed of having a walkoff homer. When I was rounding second, it was on my mind— 'I'm going to make it. I'm going to make my dream come true.' And then, I couldn't." Instead, he had a two-run triple that tied the game, the first game-tying triple in the 9th or later by an Angel since Gil Flores in 1977, forcing extra innings. The Angels would go on to win 5–3 in the 11th inning. Sierra is the only active MLB position player with at least 500 plate appearances and no home runs.

In a game on September 6, in which Sierra entered as a pinch-runner, he came to bat in the bottom of the 10th inning tied 4–4 with runners at first and third and one out. He bunted for a single on the first pitch he saw off Andrew Chafin to score Andrew Velazquez and win the game. It was his first career walk-off hit. On September 28, the Angels designated Sierra for assignment. He cleared waivers and was sent outright to the Triple–A Salt Lake Bees on October 2. On October 13, Sierra elected free agency.

=== Atlanta Braves ===
On January 30, 2023, Sierra signed a minor league contract with the Atlanta Braves organization. In 61 games for the Triple–A Gwinnett Stripers, he batted .218/.293/.295 with two home runs, 21 RBI, and 11 stolen bases. Sierra elected free agency following the season on November 6.

=== Hagerstown Flying Boxcars ===
On April 22, 2024, Sierra signed with the Hagerstown Flying Boxcars of the Atlantic League of Professional Baseball. In 16 games for Hagerstown, Sierra batted .333/.409/.460 with one home run, eight RBI, and seven stolen bases.

=== Acereros de Monclova ===
On May 14, 2024, Sierra's contract was purchased by the Acereros de Monclova of the Mexican League. In 61 appearances for Monclova, he batted .321/.361/.468 with five home runs, 27 RBI, and 15 stolen bases.

Sierra made 71 appearances for the Acereros during the 2025 season, batting .348/.395/.403 with one home run, 29 RBI, and 13 stolen bases.

=== Bravos de León ===
On March 6, 2026, Sierra was loaned to the Bravos de León of the Mexican League. In 44 appearances for León, he slashed .343/.385/.453 with four home runs, 23 RBI, and 13 stolen bases.

=== Acereros de Monclova (second stint) ===
On June 8, 2026, Sierra was returned to the Acereros de Monclova of the Mexican League.

== See also ==
- List of Major League Baseball players from the Dominican Republic
