= Jordan Yamamoto =

American baseball player (born 1996)

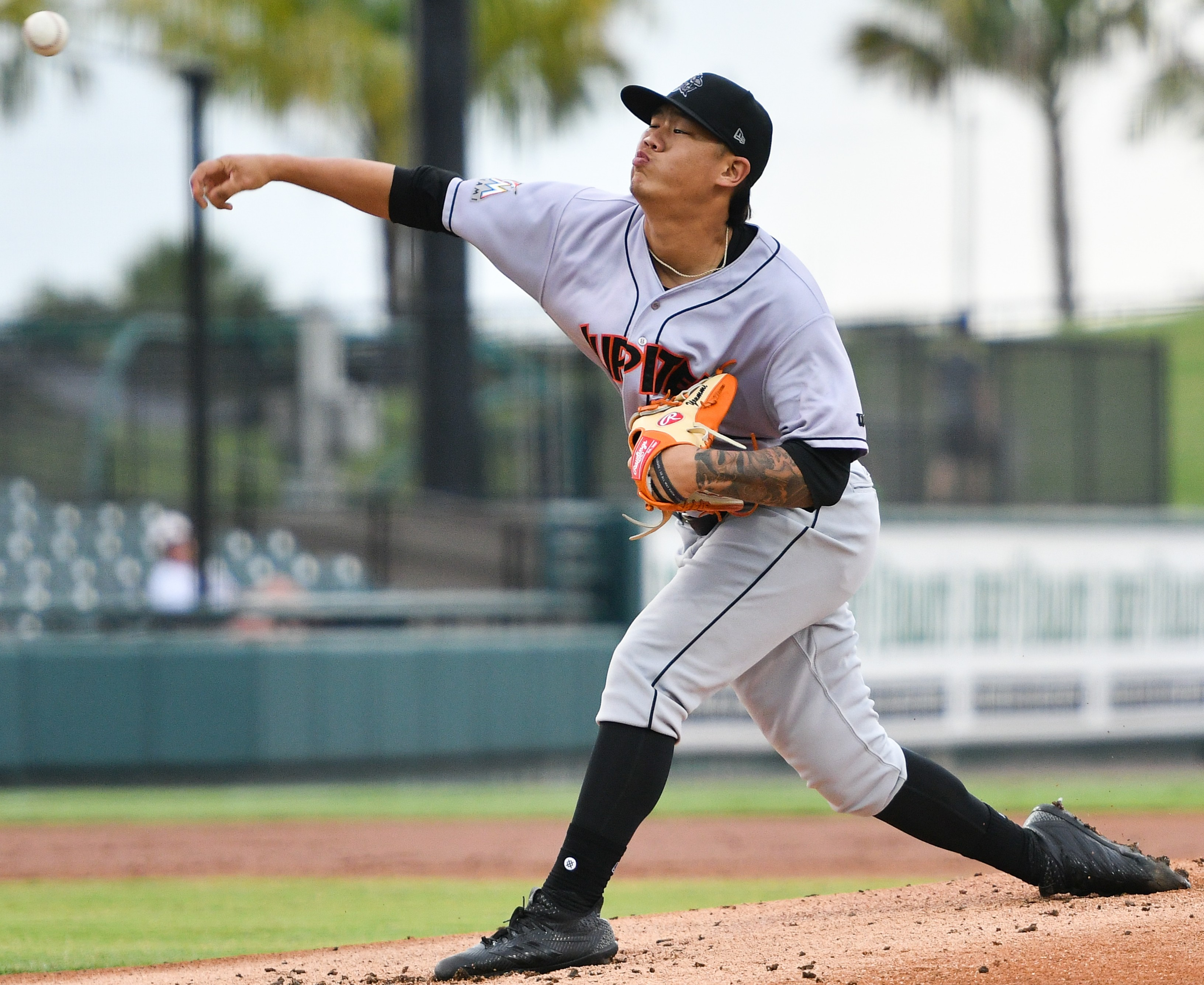
- Yamamoto with the Jupiter Hammerheads in 2018
- Pitcher
- Born: May 11, 1996 (age 30); Pearl City, Hawaii, U.S.
- Batted: Right Threw: Right

MLB debut
- June 12, 2019, for the Miami Marlins

Last MLB appearance
- May 23, 2021, for the New York Mets

MLB statistics
- Win–loss record: 5–7
- Earned run average: 6.05
- Strikeouts: 98
- Stats at Baseball Reference

Teams
- Miami Marlins (2019–2020); New York Mets (2021)

Jordan Michael Michiru Yamamoto (born May 11, 1996) is an American former professional baseball pitcher. He played in Major League Baseball (MLB) for the Miami Marlins and New York Mets.

== Early life ==
Yamamoto was born on Oahu to Larry, a diesel mechanic, and Candice Yamamoto, the vice president of a credit union. He is of half Filipino descent as well as Japanese, Chinese, Spanish and Portuguese ancestry. He has two sisters.

Yamamoto attended Saint Louis School in Honolulu, Hawaii. Per Yamamoto, he first caught the attention of scouts when they came to the ballpark to watch his teammate Kodi Medeiros pitch. In the summer before his senior year, he committed to play college baseball at Arizona on a full scholarship over competing offers from Utah, Oregon and Loyola Marymount. Yamamoto's fastball topped out at 92 miles per hour (148 km/h) in the state tournament in his senior year.

== Professional career ==
=== Milwaukee Brewers ===
The Milwaukee Brewers selected him in the 12th round of the 2014 MLB draft, and he signed with Milwaukee rather than attend Arizona.

After signing, Milwaukee assigned Yamamoto to the Arizona League Brewers where he went 0-1 with a 4.57 ERA in 21 2/3 innings. In 2015, he pitched for the Helena Brewers where he pitched to a 1-6 record and 7.84 ERA in 14 games (11 starts). Yamamoto played for the Wisconsin Timber Rattlers in 2016, posting a 7-8 record and 3.82 ERA, and the Carolina Mudcats in 2017 where he pitched to a 9-4 record and 2.51 ERA in 22 games (18 starts).

=== Miami Marlins ===
On January 25, 2018, the Brewers traded Yamamoto, Isan Díaz, Lewis Brinson, and Monte Harrison to the Miami Marlins in exchange for Christian Yelich. He was a non-roster invitee to 2018 spring training, and spent the 2018 season with the Jupiter Hammerheads of the High-A Florida State League and the Jacksonville Jumbo Shrimp of the Double-A Southern League. In seven starts for Jupiter, he was 4-1 with a 1.55 ERA, and in three starts for Jacksonville he went 1-0 with a 2.12 ERA. After the season, he pitched for the Salt River Rafters in the Arizona Fall League.

The Marlins added Yamamoto to their 40-man roster after the 2018 season, in order to protect him from the Rule 5 draft. He returned to Jacksonville to begin the 2019 season.

On June 12, 2019, Yamamoto was called up to the major leagues for the first time following an injury to José Ureña. He pitched seven shutout innings with five strikeouts and earned the win as the Marlins defeated the St. Louis Cardinals 9–0. In his next appearance, which was against the Cardinals again, he pitched another seven shutout innings with seven strikeouts in the 6–0 victory. Yamamoto set a franchise record with 14 scoreless innings to start his career. Yamamoto pitched in 4 games for the club in 2020, notching a 18.26 ERA with 13 strikeouts in 11 1/3 innings pitched. On January 28, 2021, Yamamoto was designated for assignment by the Marlins following the signing of Anthony Bass.

=== New York Mets ===
On February 1, 2021, Yamamoto was traded to the New York Mets in exchange for Federico Polanco. On May 25, Yamamoto was placed on the 60-day injured list with right shoulder soreness.

On April 5, 2022, Yamamoto was designated for assignment to create room on the roster for Chasen Shreve, whose contract was selected. He cleared waivers and was sent outright to the Triple-A Syracuse Mets on April 10. Yamamoto made 24 appearances split between the High-A Brooklyn Cyclones, Double-A Binghamton Rumble Ponies, and Syracuse, accumulating a 3-2 record and 6.00 ERA with 57 strikeouts across 54 innings. He elected free agency following the season on November 10.

=== Los Angeles Dodgers ===
On January 23, 2023, Yamamoto signed a minor league contract with the Los Angeles Dodgers. On March 13, Yamamoto announced his retirement from professional baseball.

== Post-playing career ==
On July 10, 2023, Yamamoto became the head coach of the William T. Dwyer High School (Palm Beach Gardens, Florida) baseball team. On May 18, 2024, he brought that team all the way to the state championship finals and they won the 6A State Championship 10-3.

== Personal life ==
Yamamoto has tattoos "all over his body" which "honor his parents, two sisters and his homeland."

During a 2019 start, Yamamoto wrote a message on his hat in support of the Thirty Meter Telescope protests. He also took to Twitter to voice his support.

In October 2019, Yamamoto became engaged to Madison Ahearn. They married in December 2020.

As a minor league baseball player, Yamamoto took up haircutting as a hobby. He would offer teammates free haircuts to practice his skills and help them save money.
