= Monte Harrison =

American baseball player (born 1995)

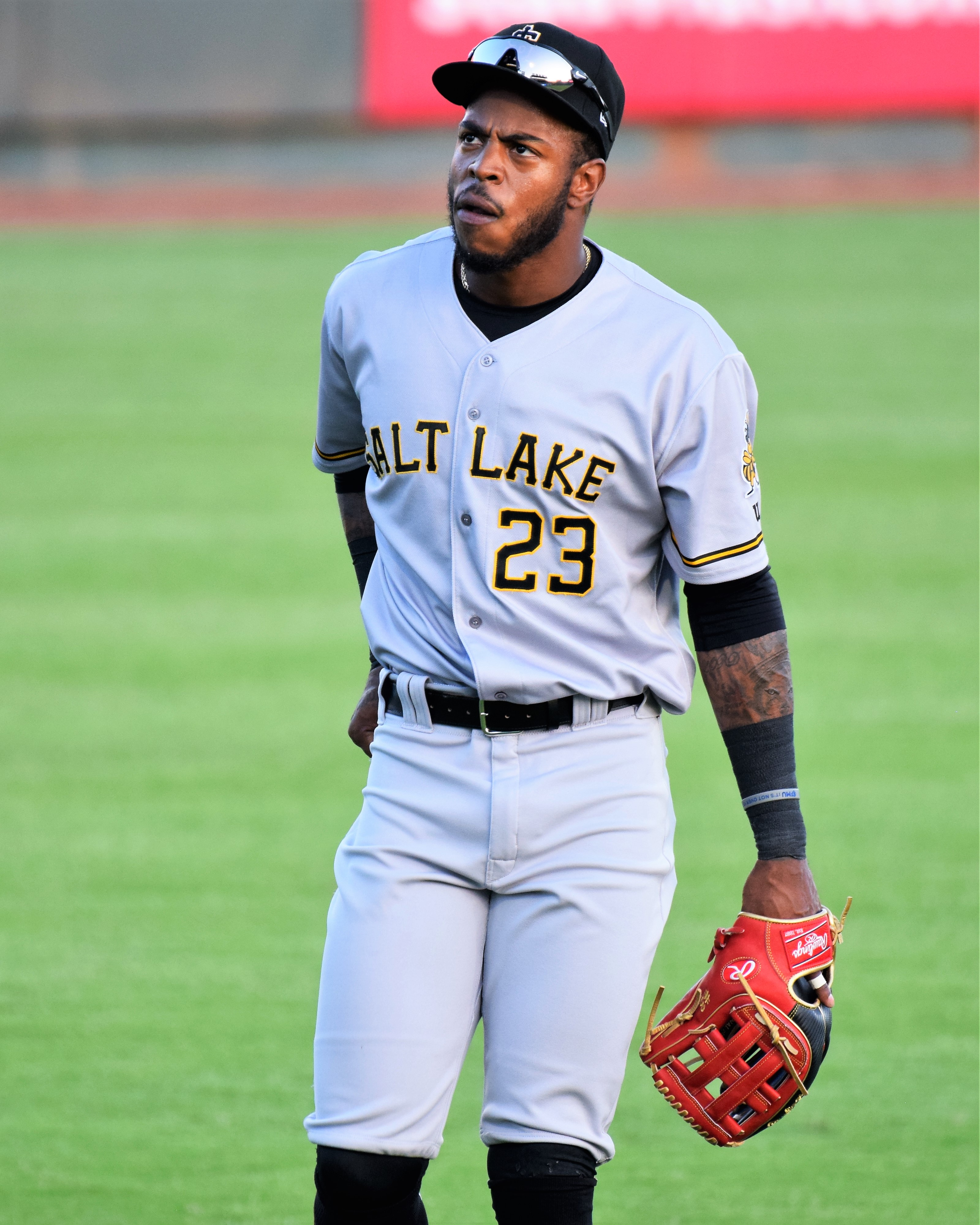
- Harrison with the Salt Lake Bees in 2022

Personal information
- Born: August 10, 1995 (age 31) Lee's Summit, Missouri, U.S.
- Height: 6 ft 3 in (191 cm)
- Weight: 230 lb (100 kg; 16 st 6 lb)
- Football career

No. 82 – Arkansas Razorbacks
- Position: Wide receiver
- Class: Junior

Career information
- High school: Lee's Summit West (Lee's Summit, MO)
- College: Arkansas (2024–present)

Sport
- Baseball career
- Outfielder
- Batted: Right Threw: Right

MLB debut
- August 4, 2020, for the Miami Marlins

Last MLB appearance
- July 12, 2022, for the Los Angeles Angels

MLB statistics
- Batting average: .176
- Home runs: 2
- Runs batted in: 6
- Stats at Baseball Reference

Teams
- Miami Marlins (2020–2021); Los Angeles Angels (2022)

Monte Fitzgerald Harrison (/mɒnˈteɪ/ mon-TAY; born August 10, 1995) is an American college football wide receiver for the Arkansas Razorbacks. He is also a former professional baseball outfielder who played in Major League Baseball (MLB) for the Miami Marlins and Los Angeles Angels.

== Baseball career ==
=== Amateur career ===
Harrison played football, baseball and basketball at Lee's Summit West High School in Lee's Summit, Missouri. In football, he had 60 receptions for 1,007 receiving yards, 13 receiving touchdowns, 198 rushing yards, 12 rushing touchdowns and threw a touchdown pass as a senior. He committed to the University of Nebraska–Lincoln to play football in July 2013. He was considered one of the top prospects for the 2014 Major League Baseball draft and was also one of the top college football recruits. He was ranked as a four-star recruit by Rivals.com, and was their 33rd best wide receiver in the class. Harrison committed to play football at Nebraska over competing offers from schools such as Arkansas, Indiana, Iowa, Kansas, Kansas State, Kentucky, Michigan State, Missouri, Tulsa and Vanderbilt.

=== Milwaukee Brewers ===
Harrison was drafted by the Milwaukee Brewers in the second round of the 2014 Major League Baseball draft. He signed with the Brewers on June 14 and was assigned to the Arizona League Brewers where he posted a .261 batting average with one home run and 20 runs batted in, along with 32 stolen bases, in 50 games.

In 2015, Harrison began the season with the Wisconsin Timber Rattlers, and after batting .148 with 11 runs batted in during 46 games, he was reassigned to the Helena Brewers, where he finished the season with a .299 average with three home runs and 13 runs batted in during 28 games. In 2016, Harrison returned to the Timber Rattlers and spent the whole season there, playing in 75 games, batting .221 with six home runs and 37 runs batted in. He spent the 2017 season with both Wisconsin and the Carolina Mudcats and posted a combined .272 batting average with 21 home runs, 67 runs batted in, and 27 stolen bases in 122 games between both clubs.

=== Miami Marlins ===
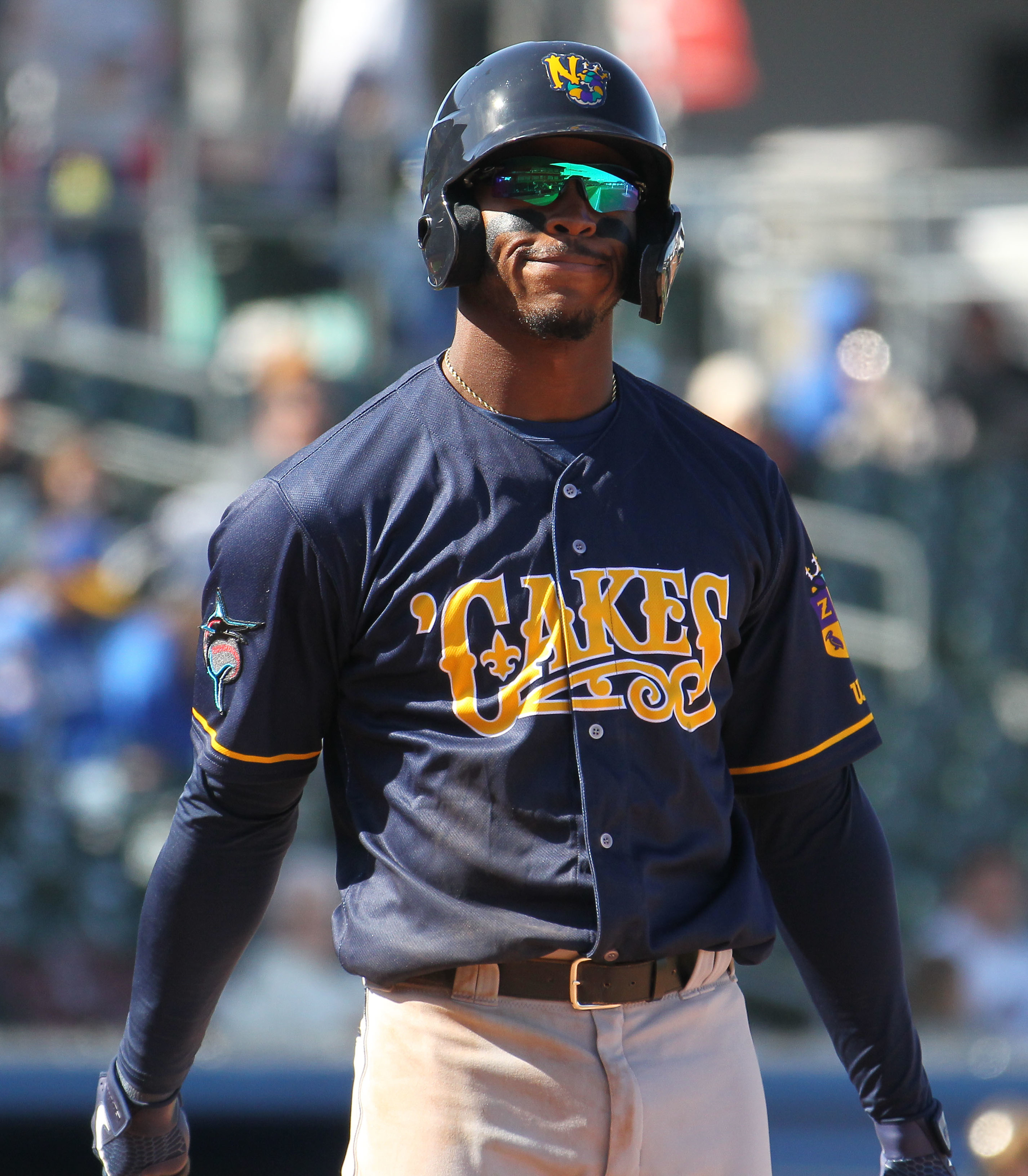
Harrison with the New Orleans Baby Cakes in 2019

On January 25, 2018, the Brewers traded Harrison, Isan Díaz, Lewis Brinson, and Jordan Yamamoto to the Miami Marlins for Christian Yelich. MLB.com ranked Harrison as Miami's second best prospect going into the 2018 season. In 2018, Harrison spent the season with the Jacksonville Jumbo Shrimp, hitting .240 with 19 home runs, 48 runs batted in, and 28 stolen bases in 136 games. After the season, The Marlins added Harrison to their 40-man roster. In 2019, Harrison opened with the New Orleans Baby Cakes. He was named to the 2019 All-Star Futures Game. Over 56 games with New Orleans, he batted .274 with nine home runs, 24 runs batted in, and 20 stolen bases.

Harrison was promoted to the major leagues on August 3, 2020, and made his MLB debut the next day. In 32 games for Miami, he hit .170 with one home run and three runs batted in. Harrison also made his postseason debut that year with the Marlins against the Chicago Cubs in the 2020 National League Wild Card Series, where he pinch-ran and had one stolen base.

To begin the 2021 MLB season, Harrison was placed at the Marlins alternate training site. On April 30, Harrison was called up by the Marlins. Harrison went 1-for-5 in three games for the Marlins before being sent down on May 4 to Triple-A Jacksonville.

On March 18, 2022, Harrison was designated for assignment by Miami. He was released by the team on March 26.

=== Los Angeles Angels ===
On April 5, 2022, Harrison signed a minor league contract with the Los Angeles Angels organization. He was promoted to the major league roster on June 24 after Juan Lagares was designated for assignment. On July 13, the Angels designated Harrison for assignment. He cleared waivers and was sent outright to the Triple-A Salt Lake Bees on July 18. On October 12, Harrison elected free agency.

=== Milwaukee Brewers (second stint) ===
On January 30, 2023, Harrison signed a minor league contract with the Milwaukee Brewers organization. In 88 games for the Triple-A Nashville Sounds, he batted .208/.277/.316 with 5 home runs, 23 runs batted in, and 18 stolen bases. On September 24, Harrison was released by Milwaukee.

== Football career ==
Despite committing to Nebraska out of high school, Harrison did not use any eligibility as a football player as he instead opted to play professional baseball after the Milwaukee Brewers drafted him in 2014. On May 7, 2024, nearly 10 years later, he committed to play football for the University of Arkansas, joining the Razorbacks as a walk-on beginning with the 2024 season.

Harrison primarily spent his freshman season on special teams, where Arkansas special teams coordinator Scott Fountain felt he would succeed given his experience in tracking baseballs as an outfielder. In his debut, a 70–0 win over Arkansas–Pine Bluff, Harrison caught two passes for 29 yards. Against UAB, he recovered a surprise onside kick by the Blazers in the first quarter, a game the Razorbacks went on to win 37–27.

=== Statistics ===
| Season | Team | Games | | Receiving | | | |
| Season | Team | GP | GS | Rec | Yds | Avg | TD |
|---|---|---|---|---|---|---|---|
| 2024 | Arkansas | 11 | 0 | 2 | 29 | 14.5 | 0 |
| 2025 | Arkansas | 2 | 0 | 1 | 29 | 29.0 | 0 |
| 2026 | Arkansas | | | | | | |
| Career | | 13 | 0 | 3 | 58 | 19.3 | 0 |

== Personal ==
His brother, Shaquille Harrison, is a professional basketball player in the EuroLeague. Harrison's father, Jack, died due to a heart attack when he was in first grade.
