= Brandon Leibrandt =

American baseball player (born 1992)

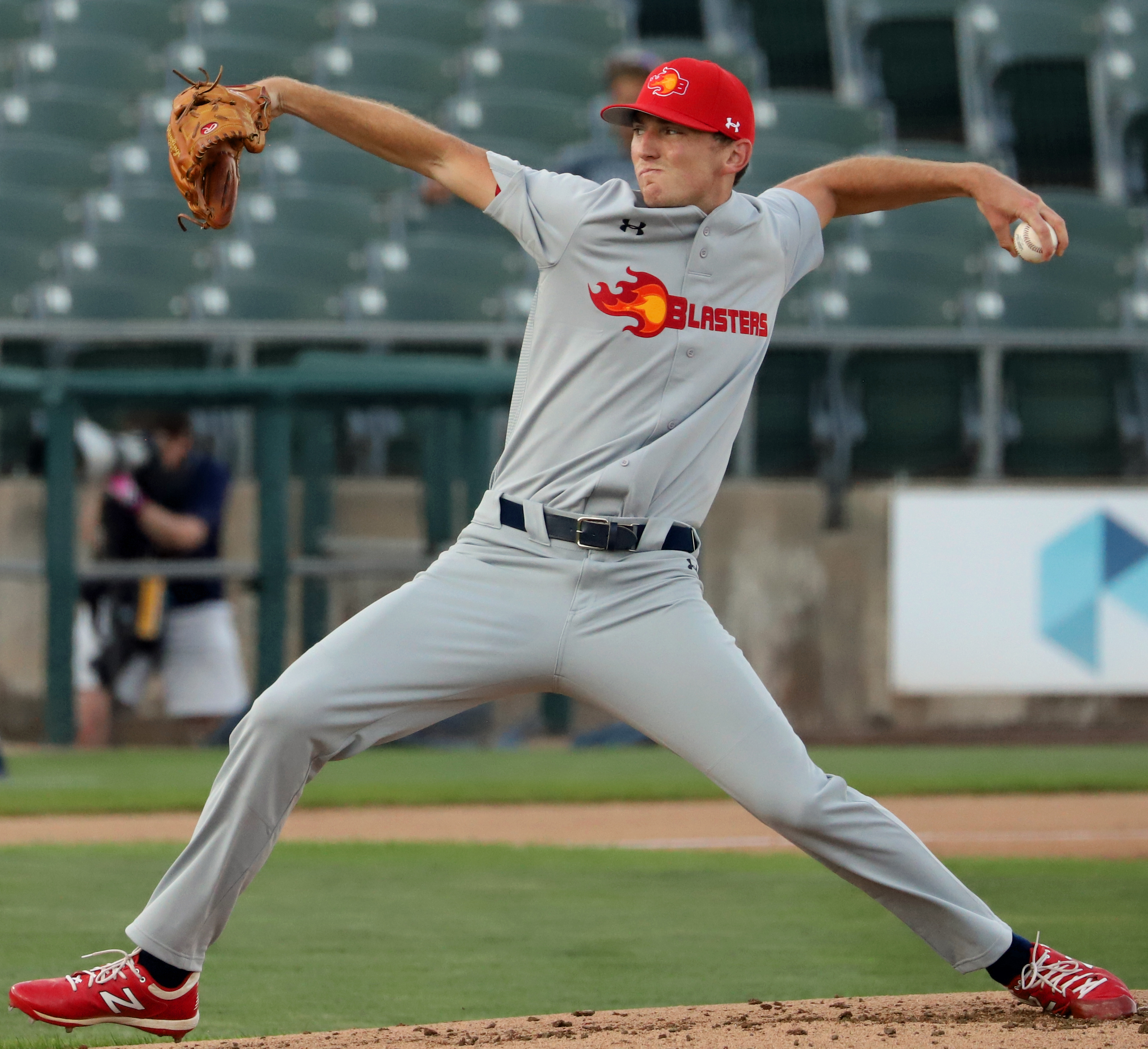
- Leibrandt with the New Jersey Blasters in 2020

Free agent
- Pitcher
- Born: December 13, 1992 (age 33); Alpharetta, Georgia, U.S.
- Bats: Left Throws: Left

Professional debut
- MLB: August 23, 2020, for the Miami Marlins
- CPBL: June 21, 2025, for the CTBC Brothers

MLB statistics (through 2026 season)
- Win–loss record: 0–0
- Earned run average: 5.91
- Strikeouts: 11

CPBL statistics (through 2025 season)
- Win–loss record: 7–3
- Earned run average: 1.94
- Strikeouts: 55
- Stats at Baseball Reference

Teams
- Miami Marlins (2020); Cincinnati Reds (2024); CTBC Brothers (2025); Cincinnati Reds (2026)

Brandon Charles Leibrandt (born December 13, 1992) is an American professional baseball pitcher who is a free agent. He has previously played in Major League Baseball (MLB) for the Miami Marlins, and Cincinnati Reds and in the Chinese Professional Baseball League (CPBL) for the CTBC Brothers.

== Career ==
=== Amateur career ===
Leibrandt attended Marist School in Brookhaven, Georgia. As a pitcher on the school's baseball team, he had a 13–0 win–loss record with an 0.71 earned run average (ERA) in 79 innings pitched with 120 strikeouts and 11 walks as a senior. Leibrandt was named Baseball America High School third team All-American in 2011 and ESPN Rise first team.

Leibrandt enrolled at Florida State University to play college baseball for the Florida State Seminoles. As a freshman in 2012, he was 8–3 with a 2.82 ERA in 19 starts (tied for third-most in the country), and as a sophomore he finished with a 10–4 record and a 3.44 ERA. In 2013, Leibrandt played collegiate summer baseball with the Brewster Whitecaps of the Cape Cod Baseball League. As a junior he was 4–1 with a 1.83 ERA, before he was injured and had his season cut short. The Philadelphia Phillies selected Leibrandt in the sixth round of the 2014 MLB draft.

=== Philadelphia Phillies ===
Leibrandt signed and spent 2014 with the GCL Phillies and Williamsport Crosscutters, pitching to a combined 3–5 record and 2.82 ERA with 67 strikeouts and an 0.97 WHIP in 60.2 innings. In 2015, he played for the Clearwater Threshers where he compiled a 7–3 record, 3.11 ERA and 1.03 WHIP in 17 starts. He was a Florida State League Mid-Season All Star, and an MiLB Phillies Organization All Star. In 2016, he returned to Clearwater, but pitched in only six games due to injury. He spent 2017 with both the Reading Fightin Phils and Lehigh Valley IronPigs, posting a combined 11–5 record and 3.62 ERA in 25 total starts between the two clubs.

Leibrandt returned to Lehigh Valley in 2018, going 4–1 with a 1.42 ERA and an 0.87 WHIP in 20 games (six starts), and struck out 32 batters in 50.2 innings. He last pitched on June 30, and underwent Tommy John surgery, missing the remainder of the 2018 season and the 2019 season.

The Phillies released Leibrandt on May 29, 2020.

=== Somerset Patriots ===
On June 3, 2020, Leibrandt signed with the Somerset Patriots of the Atlantic League of Professional Baseball. With the 2020 Atlantic League cancelled by the COVID-19 pandemic, Leibrandt was assigned to the New Jersey Blasters as part of the SOMERSET Professional Baseball Series, a twelve game series organized by the Patriots for the 2020 season.

=== Miami Marlins ===
On August 10, 2020, the Miami Marlins selected Leibrandt's contract from Somerset. Leibrandt was promoted to the major leagues on August 18. He made his major league debut on August 23 against the Washington Nationals. On the season, Leibrandt appeared in five big league games, notching a 2.00 ERA with three strikeouts in 9 innings pitched. He was removed from the 40–man roster and sent outright to the Triple–A Jacksonville Jumbo Shrimp on October 29, and became a free agent on November 2.

On April 5, 2021, Leibrandt re-signed with the Marlins on a minor league contract. Leibrandt split the season between Jacksonville and the Double–A Pensacola Blue Wahoos, posting a cumulative 5.68 ERA with 74 strikeouts in 88 2/3 innings of work across 21 games. He elected free agency following the season on November 7.

=== Chicago Cubs ===
On February 28, 2022, Leibrandt signed with the Wild Health Genomes of the Atlantic League of Professional Baseball. However, he was released by the team on March 7 prior to the ALPB season.

On March 16, 2022, Leibrandt signed a minor league contract with the Chicago Cubs. Leibrandt split time between the Double–A Tennessee Smokies and Triple–A Iowa Cubs, pitching to a cumulative 4–4 record and 4.67 ERA with 68 strikeouts in 69 1/3 innings of work across 21 games (8 starts). He was released by the Cubs organization on August 5.

=== High Point Rockers ===
On April 28, 2023, Leibrandt signed with the High Point Rockers of the Atlantic League of Professional Baseball. He made 3 starts for the Rockers, posting a 5.40 ERA with 9 strikeouts in 11 2/3 innings pitched. Leibrandt was released by the team on May 14. On July 31, Leibrandt re–signed with the Rockers. He totaled a 3.26 ERA with 53 strikeouts across 12 starts for the club in 2023.

On April 19, 2024, Leibrandt re–signed with the Rockers. In 4 starts for the club, Leibrandt compiled an 0.93 ERA with 24 strikeouts across 19 1/3 innings pitched.

=== Cincinnati Reds ===
On May 24, 2024, Leibrandt's contract was purchased by the Cincinnati Reds organization. In 15 starts for the Triple–A Louisville Bats, he registered a 3–4 record and 4.46 ERA with 63 strikeouts across 72 2/3 innings of work. On August 29, the Reds selected Leibrandt's contract, adding him to their active roster. He made his Reds debut that same day, pitching 2 1/3 innings of scoreless relief in a Reds win. Leibrandt was designated for assignment by Cincinnati on October 28. He cleared waivers and elected free agency on October 30.

=== New York Yankees ===
On November 8, 2024, Leibrandt signed a minor league contract with the New York Yankees organization. In 10 appearances (nine starts) for the Triple-A Scranton/Wilkes-Barre RailRiders, he logged a 1-0 record and 2.85 ERA with 37 strikeouts and one save across 41 innings pitched. Leibrandt was released by the Yankees organization on June 10.

=== CTBC Brothers ===
On June 12, 2025, Leibrandt signed with the CTBC Brothers of the Chinese Professional Baseball League. Leibrandt made 14 starts for the Brothers, compiling a 7-3 record and 1.94 ERA with 55 strikeouts across 83 1/3 innings pitched.

=== Cincinnati Reds (second stint) ===
On December 27, 2025, Leibrandt signed a minor league contract with the Cincinnati Reds. On June 1, 2026, the Reds selected Leibrandt's contract, adding him to their active roster. He made one appearance for the team, allowing five runs on 10 hits with three strikeouts across six innings pitched against the Kansas City Royals. The following day, Leibrandt was designated for assignment by Cincinnati. He cleared waivers and was sent outright to the Triple-A Louisville Bats on June 4. He elected free agency on October 30.

== Personal life ==
Leibrandt in the son of former MLB pitcher Charlie Leibrandt, who won the 1985 World Series with the Kansas City Royals.

== See also ==
- List of second-generation Major League Baseball players
