= Brian Anderson (third baseman) =

American baseball player (born 1993)

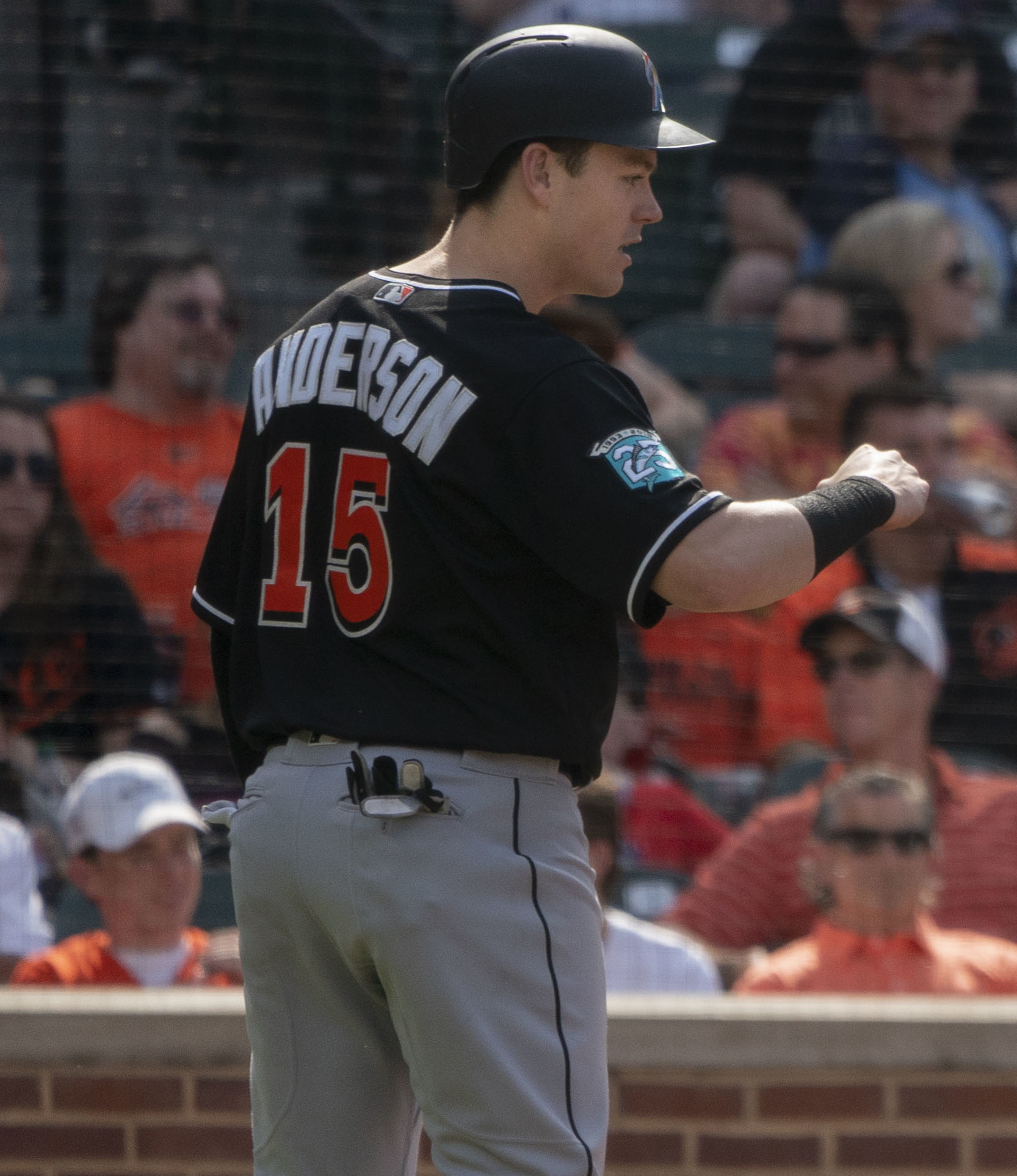
- Anderson with the Miami Marlins in 2018
- Third baseman / Right fielder
- Born: May 19, 1993 (age 33); Edmond, Oklahoma, U.S.
- Batted: Right Threw: Right

MLB debut
- September 1, 2017, for the Miami Marlins

Last MLB appearance
- June 12, 2024, for the Atlanta Braves

MLB statistics
- Batting average: .251
- Home runs: 66
- Runs batted in: 273
- Stats at Baseball Reference

Teams
- Miami Marlins (2017–2022); Milwaukee Brewers (2023); Atlanta Braves (2024)

Brian Wade Anderson (born May 19, 1993) is an American former professional baseball third baseman and right fielder. He played in Major League Baseball (MLB) for the Miami Marlins, Milwaukee Brewers, and Atlanta Braves. He made his MLB debut in 2017 with the Marlins. Anderson played college baseball for the Arkansas Razorbacks.

== Amateur career ==
Anderson attended Deer Creek High School in Edmond, Oklahoma and was drafted by the Minnesota Twins in the 20th round of the 2011 MLB draft. He did not sign with the Twins and enrolled at the University of Arkansas, where he played college baseball for the Arkansas Razorbacks.

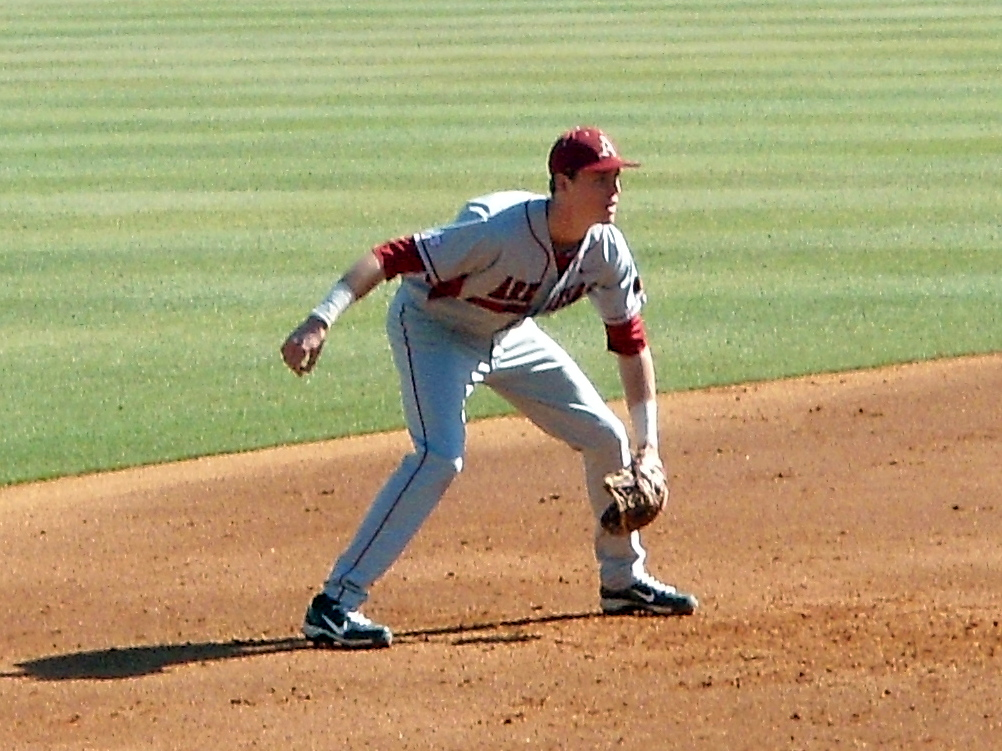
Anderson playing third base at Arkansas

Anderson contributed as a freshman during the 2012 Razorbacks season. Anderson played 47 games, mixed among second base, third base, and right field for the Hogs, hitting .283 with 2 home runs and 11 RBI. The Razorbacks reached the 2012 College World Series and ended the season ranked #3 nationally. In summer 2012, he played for the Lakeshore Chinooks of the Northwoods League.

In 2013, he played collegiate summer baseball with the Hyannis Harbor Hawks of the Cape Cod Baseball League.

During Anderson's junior season at Arkansas, the 2014 Razorbacks finished 40–25 and were eliminated in the NCAA tournament Regionals. Anderson hit .328 and played third base and right field.

== Professional career ==
=== Miami Marlins ===
==== Minor leagues ====
After his junior year, the Miami Marlins selected Anderson in the third round of the 2014 MLB draft. Anderson made his professional debut with the Batavia Muckdogs of the Low–A New York-Penn League and was promoted to the Greensboro Grasshoppers of the Single–A South Atlantic League after 20 games. In 59 total games between the two teams, he slashed .300/.363/.496 with 11 home runs and 49 RBIs.

In 2015, Anderson played for the Jupiter Hammerheads of the High–A Florida State League where he batted .235 with eight home runs and 62 RBIs in 132 games. After the regular season, he played in the Arizona Fall League.

In 2016, Anderson played for both Jupiter and the Jacksonville Suns of the Double–A Southern League where he compiled a combined .265 batting average with 11 home runs, 65 RBIs, and 21 doubles in 135 games between the two teams. He was named the Marlins Minor League Player of the Year. He played in the Arizona Fall League after the season for the second consecutive year.

In 2017, Anderson spent the season with both Jacksonville and the New Orleans Baby Cakes of the Triple–A International League, batting .275 with 22 home runs, 81 RBIs, and an .853 OPS in 120 games. Midway through the season, Anderson represented the Marlins in the 2017 All-Star Futures Game.

==== Major Leagues ====
On September 1, 2017, the Marlins promoted Anderson to MLB from New Orleans, and he made his MLB debut that day.

In 2018, Anderson started the season with the Marlins at third base. He hit his first career home run on April 2, 2018, off Boston Red Sox pitcher Brian Johnson at Marlins Park. He led all Marlins players in games played (156), plate appearances (670) and runs scored (87). His season earned him mention as a possible National League Rookie of the Year contender, ultimately won by Ronald Acuña Jr.

In 2019, During his second full MLB season, Anderson set career highs in home runs (20), runs batted in (66) and OPS (.811). He also performed well defensively, totaling nine outfield assists in only 55 appearances in right field. On August 23, he fractured his left fifth metacarpal in his left hand when he was hit by a pitch during the bottom of the third inning. The injury did not require surgery, but ended his season prematurely.

On August 5, 2020, Anderson started at first base for the first time in his MLB career. He led NL third basemen that year in errors, with nine. On offense, Anderson slashed .255/.345/.465 with 11 home runs and 38 RBI in 200 at-bats.

On June 14, 2021, Anderson was placed on the 60-day injured list with a left shoulder subluxation. On September 10, Anderson underwent season-ending shoulder surgery.

On March 22, 2022, Anderson signed a $4.475 million contract with the Marlins, avoiding salary arbitration. Anderson appeared in 98 games for Miami in 2022, slashing .222/.311/.346 with 8 home runs and 28 RBI. On November 18, he was non-tendered and became a free agent.

=== Milwaukee Brewers ===
On January 23, 2023, Anderson signed a one-year, $3.5 million contract with the Milwaukee Brewers. In 96 games for Milwaukee, he hit .226/.310/.368 with 9 home runs and 40 RBI. On September 28, Anderson was designated for assignment following Garrett Mitchell's activation from the injured list. On October 2, Anderson was released by the Brewers organization after clearing waivers.

=== Seattle Mariners ===
On February 23, 2024, Anderson signed a minor league contract with the Seattle Mariners. He was released by the Mariners organization on March 24. On March 28, Anderson re–signed with the Mariners on a new minor league contract. In 42 games for the Triple–A Tacoma Rainiers, he batted .270/.358/.439 with six home runs and 28 RBI. Anderson triggered the opt–out clause in his contract and was released by the Mariners organization on June 1.

=== Atlanta Braves ===
On June 4, 2024, Anderson signed a major league contract with the Atlanta Braves. In three games for the Braves, Anderson went 0–for–5 (.000). Anderson cleared waivers and was sent outright to the Triple–A Gwinnett Stripers on July 15. He elected free agency the following day. On July 24, Anderson re-signed with Atlanta on a new minor league contract. He became a free agent after the season.
