= Wellington Cepeda =

Dominican baseball coach (born 1973)

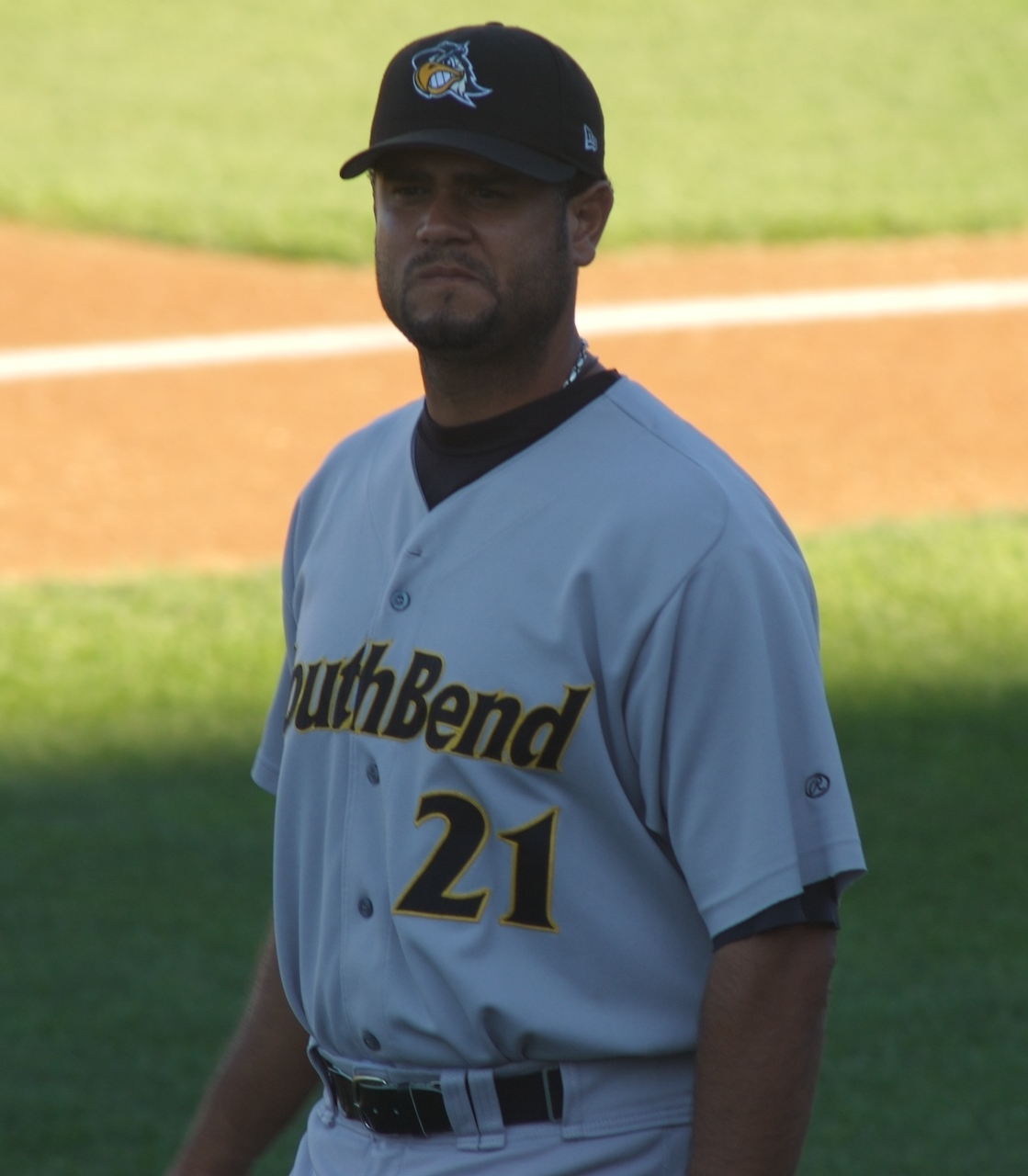
- Cepeda with the South Bend Silver Hawks in 2007

Arizona Diamondbacks – No. 76
- Bullpen coach
- Born: November 25, 1973 (age 52); La Vega, Dominican Republic
- Bats: Right Throws: Right

Teams
- As coach: Miami Marlins (2020–2024); Arizona Diamondbacks (2025–present)

Wellington Cepeda (born November 25, 1973) is a Dominican professional baseball coach and former pitcher who currently serves as the bullpen coach for the Arizona Diamondbacks of Major League Baseball (MLB). He has previously served as a manager in the Dominican Professional Baseball League. He played in minor league baseball as a right-handed pitcher from 1997 to 2000.

== Career ==
Cepeda began his career as a pitcher in the Arizona Diamondbacks organization. He spent 1997 with the AZL Diamondbacks, 1998 with the South Bend Silver Hawks, 1999 with the High Desert Mavericks, and spent his final season in 2000 back with South Bend.

Cepeda began his coaching career as the pitching coach for the Missoula Osprey in 2003 and 2004. He spent the 2005 though 2007 seasons as South Bend's pitching coach. Cepeda spent the 2008 and 2009 seasons as the pitching coach of the Visalia Oaks / Visalia Rawhide. He returned to South Bend as pitching coach for the 2010 through 2013 seasons. He spent the 2014 and 2015 seasons as the Mobile BayBears pitching coach. In 2019, Cepeda was the manager of the AZL Diamondbacks.

=== Miami Marlins ===
Cepeda was hired as the Miami Marlins' bullpen coach following the 2019 season. On October 2, 2024, Cepeda was fired alongside the entirety of the Marlins coaching staff.

=== Arizona Diamondbacks ===
On November 28, 2024, Cepeda was hired to be the new bullpen coach and assistant pitching coach for the Arizona Diamondbacks.
