= Garrett Cooper =

American baseball player (born 1990)

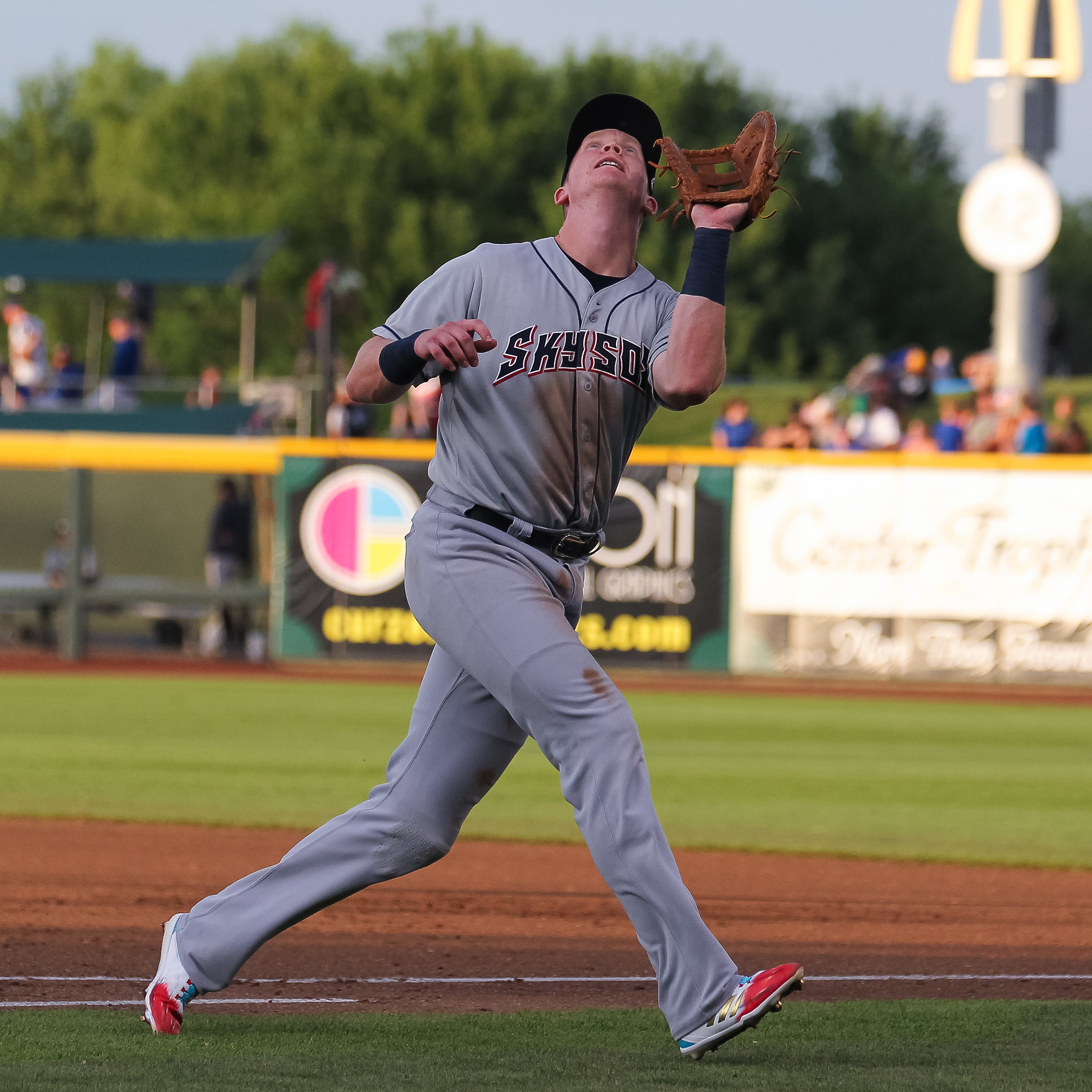
- Cooper with the Colorado Springs Sky Sox in 2017
- First baseman / Right fielder
- Born: December 25, 1990 (age 35); Torrance, California, U.S.
- Batted: Right Threw: Right

MLB debut
- July 14, 2017, for the New York Yankees

Last MLB appearance
- June 9, 2024, for the Boston Red Sox

MLB statistics
- Batting average: .265
- Home runs: 57
- Runs batted in: 233
- Stats at Baseball Reference

Teams
- New York Yankees (2017); Miami Marlins (2018–2023); San Diego Padres (2023); Chicago Cubs (2024); Boston Red Sox (2024)

Career highlights and awards
- All-Star (2022)

Garrett Nicholas Cooper (born December 25, 1990) is an American former professional baseball first baseman and right fielder. He played in Major League Baseball (MLB) for the New York Yankees, Miami Marlins, San Diego Padres, Chicago Cubs, and Boston Red Sox. Cooper was an All-Star in 2022.

== Early life and education ==
Garrett Nicholas Cooper was raised in Rancho Palos Verdes, California. He attended Loyola High School in Los Angeles. As a senior, he hit .397 with four home runs and 25 RBIs. After high school, he enrolled and played college baseball at El Camino College and Auburn University. In 2013, his senior year at Auburn, he slashed .354/.481/.540 with seven home runs and 37 RBIs in 56 games.

== Career ==
=== Milwaukee Brewers ===
The Milwaukee Brewers selected Cooper in the sixth round of the 2013 Major League Baseball draft. He signed and spent 2013 with both the Helena Brewers and the Wisconsin Timber Rattlers, batting a combined .283 with six home runs and 30 RBIs in 48 total games between both teams. In 2014, he played for Wisconsin, the AZL Brewers, and the Brevard County Manatees, slashing .262/.347/.390 with four home runs and 27 RBIs between the three clubs, and in 2015, he played for Brevard County and the Biloxi Shuckers, posting a combined .310 with eight home runs and 59 RBIs. Cooper spent 2016 with Biloxi and the Colorado Springs Sky Sox where he compiled a .292 batting average with nine home runs, 69 RBIs. He began 2017 back with Colorado where he slashed .366/.428/.652 with 17 home runs and 82 RBIs in 75 games.

=== New York Yankees ===
On July 13, 2017, the Brewers traded Cooper to the New York Yankees in exchange for left handed pitcher Tyler Webb. The Yankees promoted Cooper to the major leagues on July 14, and he made his debut that day against the Boston Red Sox at Fenway Park. On July 16, Cooper got his first MLB hit off David Price. In 13 games for the Yankees, he batted .326 with five doubles and six RBIs. He also spent time with the Trenton Thunder and Scranton/Wilkes-Barre RailRiders while with the Yankees organization.

=== Miami Marlins ===
On November 20, 2017, the Yankees traded Cooper and Caleb Smith to the Miami Marlins for pitcher Michael King and international bonus pool money. On March 25, 2018, the Marlins announced the Cooper had made the Opening Day roster. He was placed on the disabled list at the beginning of May, and was activated at the beginning of July.

Cooper hit his first major league home run on May 22, 2019, off Detroit Tigers pitcher Daniel Norris. It was the 39th game he had played in the major leagues. The next day, he hit his second home run, a grand slam, off Detroit pitcher Shane Greene with two outs in the top of the ninth inning; Miami went on to defeat Detroit 5–2. He finished the 2019 season hitting .281/.344/.446 with 15 home runs and 50 RBIs in 381 at bats over 107 games. In the pandemic-shortened 2020 season, Cooper batted .283/.353/.500 with 6 home runs and 20 RBIs in 34 games.

On July 28, 2021, it was announced that Cooper had suffered a partial tear of the ulnar collateral ligament in his left elbow and would require season-ending surgery. He was subsequently placed on the 60-day injured list. He finished the 2021 season batting .284/.380/.465 with 9 home runs and 33 RBIs in 71 games.

On March 22, 2022, Cooper signed a $2.5 million contract with the Marlins, avoiding salary arbitration. Cooper was named to the 2022 MLB All-Star Game as a roster replacement for Bryce Harper, who withdrew from the game due to injury. On September 27, Cooper suffered a fractured finger after getting hit by a pitch in the 6-3 win over the New York Mets

On January 13, 2023, Cooper agreed to a one-year, $4.2 million contract with the Marlins, avoiding salary arbitration.

=== San Diego Padres ===
On August 1, 2023, the Marlins traded Cooper and Sean Reynolds to the San Diego Padres in exchange for Ryan Weathers. With the Padres he batted .239/.323/.402. He became a free agent on November 2, 2023.

=== Chicago Cubs ===
On February 25, 2024, Cooper signed a minor league contract with the Chicago Cubs. On March 28, Cooper had his contract selected after making Chicago's Opening Day roster. Though he batted .270 in 12 games, the Cubs designated Cooper for assignment on April 23 after Patrick Wisdom returned to the active roster.

=== Boston Red Sox ===
On April 27, 2024, Cooper was traded to the Boston Red Sox in exchange for cash considerations. He was added to the team's active roster two days later. Cooper would make his Red Sox debut on April 30 in a game against the San Francisco Giants. During that game, he would strike out twice and exited the game with a right wrist contusion after being hit by a pitch from Sean Hjelle in the 5th inning. In 24 games for Boston, he batted .171/.227/.229 with no home runs and five RBI. Cooper was designated for assignment after Masataka Yoshida returned from the injured list on June 11. After clearing waivers on June 14, he was released by the Red Sox.

=== Baltimore Orioles ===
On June 24, 2024, Cooper signed a minor league contract with the Baltimore Orioles. In 20 games for the Triple-A Norfolk Tides, he batted .310/.393/.521 with four home runs and 24 RBI. Cooper elected free agency following the season on November 4.

=== Atlanta Braves ===
On January 12, 2025, Cooper signed a minor league contract with the Atlanta Braves. In 35 appearances for the Triple-A Gwinnett Stripers, he batted .228/.312/.309 with two home runs and 17 RBI. Cooper was released by the Braves organization on May 18.

On September 28, 2025, Cooper announced his retirement from professional baseball.

== Personal life ==
Cooper and his wife, Erica, had their first child in March 2022.
