= Patrick Bailey =

American baseball player (born 1999)

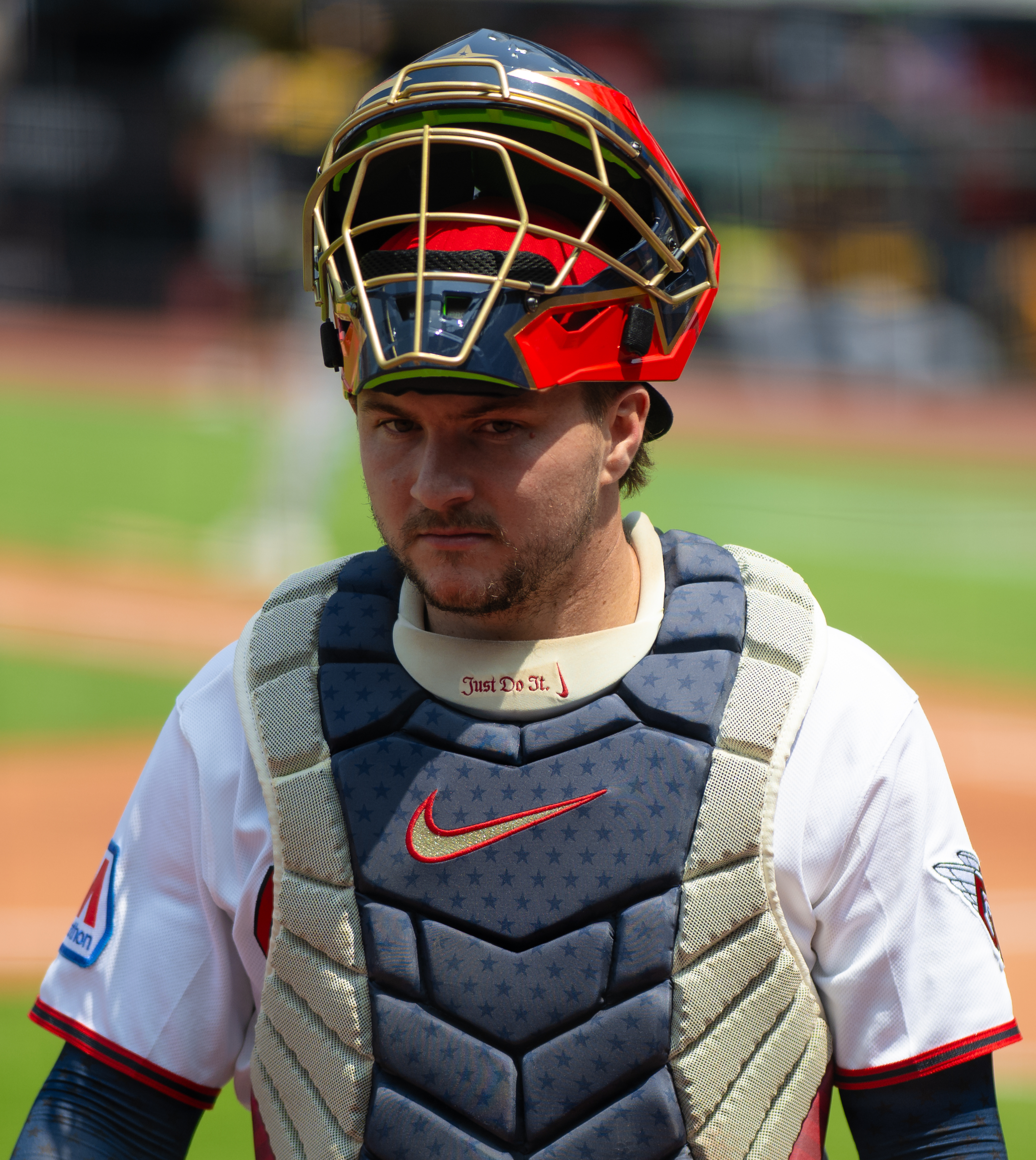
- Bailey with the Cleveland Guardians in 2026

Cleveland Guardians – No. 16
- Catcher
- Born: May 29, 1999 (age 27); Greensboro, North Carolina, U.S.
- Bats: Switch Throws: Right

MLB debut
- May 19, 2023, for the San Francisco Giants

MLB statistics (through 2026 season)
- Batting average: .225
- Home runs: 31
- Runs batted in: 186
- Stats at Baseball Reference

Teams
- San Francisco Giants (2023–2026); Cleveland Guardians (2026–present)

Career highlights and awards
- 2× Gold Glove Award (2024, 2025)

Patrick Lee Bailey (born May 29, 1999) is an American professional baseball catcher for the Cleveland Guardians of Major League Baseball (MLB). He has previously played in MLB for the San Francisco Giants. Bailey played college baseball for the NC State Wolfpack, and was selected 13th overall by the San Francisco Giants in the first round of the 2020 MLB draft. He made his MLB debut in 2023 and won Gold Glove Awards in 2024 and 2025. He was traded to Guardians during the 2026 season.

== Early life ==
Patrick Lee Bailey was born on May 29, 1999 to Steve and Celeste Bailey, in Greensboro, North Carolina. Bailey attended Wesleyan Christian Academy ('17) in High Point, North Carolina, where he played catcher for the baseball team. In 2016, he played for the U-18 United States national baseball team. In 2017, his senior year, he batted .510/.561/.947 with 13 doubles, seven triples, five home runs, and 33 runs batted in (RBIs) in 96 at bats. He was drafted by the Minnesota Twins in the 37th round of the 2017 Major League Baseball draft, but did not sign and instead chose to fulfill his commitment to play college baseball at North Carolina State University.

== College career ==
In 2018, Bailey's freshman year at NC State, he slashed .321/.419/.604 (fourth in the Atlantic Coast Conference (ACC)) with 13 home runs (an NC State freshman record) and 40 RBIs, earning ACC Freshman of the Year honors alongside being named a Freshman-All American and to the All-ACC Second Team. He was named a Freshman All-American by First Team D1Baseball, NCBWA & Perfect Game, and Collegiate Baseball, and selected as a member of the ABCA All-Region Team. After the 2018 season, he played collegiate summer baseball with the Yarmouth–Dennis Red Sox of the Cape Cod Baseball League. He was also selected for the United States collegiate national team.

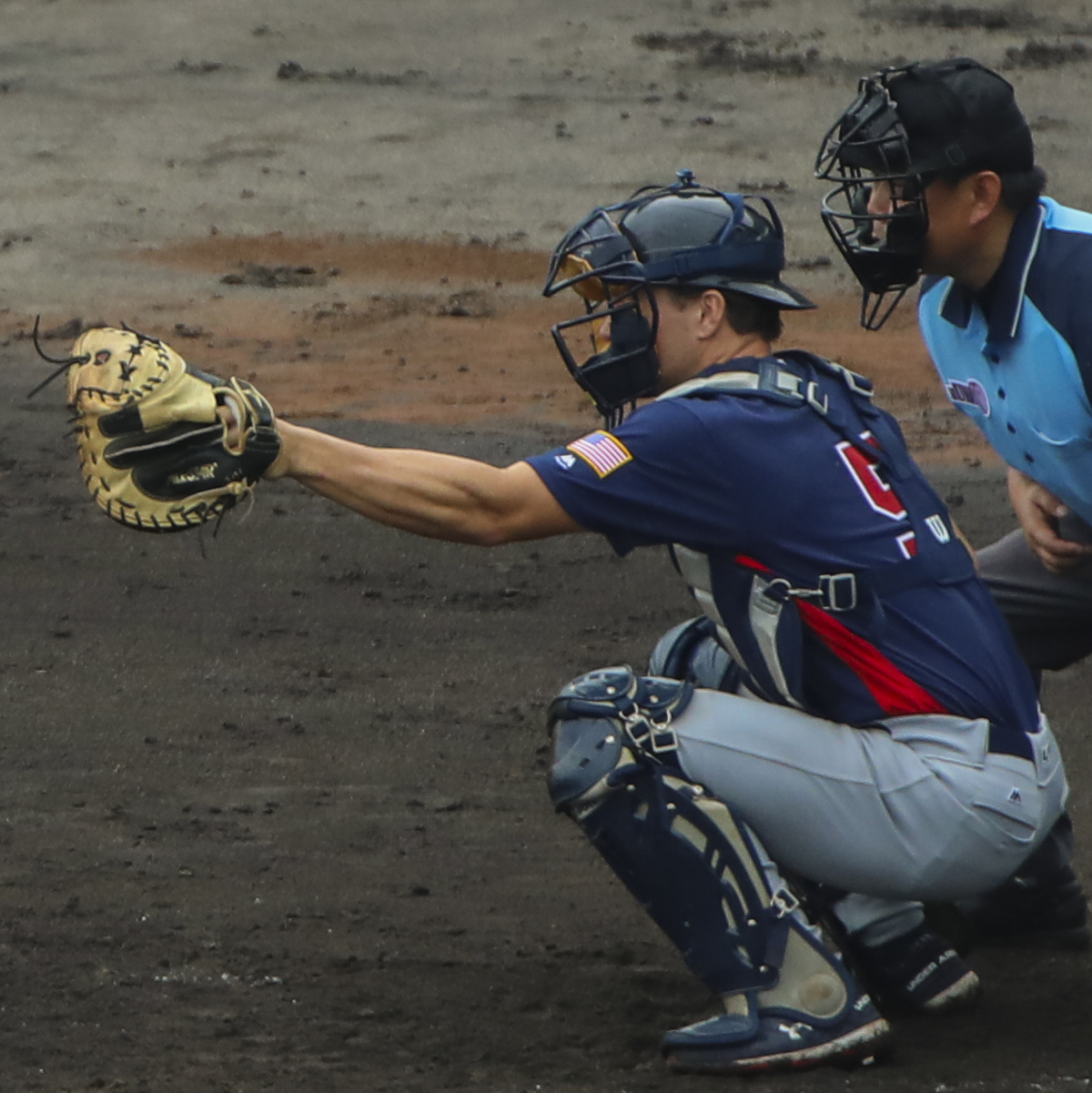
Bailey with the United States collegiate national baseball team in 2019

As a sophomore in 2019, Bailey batted .288/.390/.513 with three triples (eighth in the ACC) and 10 home runs alongside a .989 fielding percentage. He was named to the All-ACC First Team, ABCA's Atlantic All-Region Team, USA Baseball's Collegiate National Team, and third team All-American by Collegiate Baseball, and was one of 14 semifinalists for the Buster Posey Award, as the nation's best catcher. That summer, he again played for the United States collegiate national team.

As a junior in 2020, he hit .296/.466/.685 in 54 at bats. He hit six home runs (fourth in the ACC), 20 RBIs (second), and 17 walks (third) over 17 games before the college baseball season was cut short due to the COVID-19 pandemic.

== Professional career ==
=== San Francisco Giants (2020–2026) ===
==== Minor leagues ====
Bailey was selected by the San Francisco Giants in the first round with the 13th overall selection of the 2020 Major League Baseball draft. He signed with the Giants for a signing bonus of $3.8 million. He did not play a minor league game in 2020 due to the cancellation of the minor league season because of the COVID-19 pandemic.

Bailey made his professional debut in 2021 with the Eugene Emeralds of the High-A West. After slashing .185/.290/.296 with two home runs and 15 RBI over 33 games, he was demoted to the Rookie-level Arizona League Giants on June 26, but was reassigned to the San Jose Giants of the Low-A West after two games. Over 47 games with San Jose to finish the season, Bailey slashed .322/.416/.531 with seven home runs, 24 RBI, and 16 doubles, and caught 48% of attempted base-stealers. He was selected to play in the Arizona Fall League for the Scottsdale Scorpions after the season where he batted .292/.375/.417 in 48 at-bats, and was named to the Fall Stars Game.

Bailey returned to Eugene for the 2022 season. Over 83 games, he hit .225/.342/.420 in 267 at bats with 12 home runs, 51 RBI, and 49 walks (eighth in the league), while leading the league with seven sacrifice flies and on defense catching 30% of attempted base-stealers. He was named the 2022 MiLB Gold Glove as the best defensive catcher in the minor leagues, an NWL post-season All Star, and an MiLB.com organization All Star.

To open the 2023 season, Bailey was assigned to the Richmond Flying Squirrels of the Double-A Eastern League. After hitting .333/.400/.482 in 60 plate appearances across 14 games, Bailey was promoted to the Triple-A Sacramento River Cats, where he posted a .216/.317/.353 slash with 2 home runs and 6 RBI across 14 games.

==== Major leagues ====
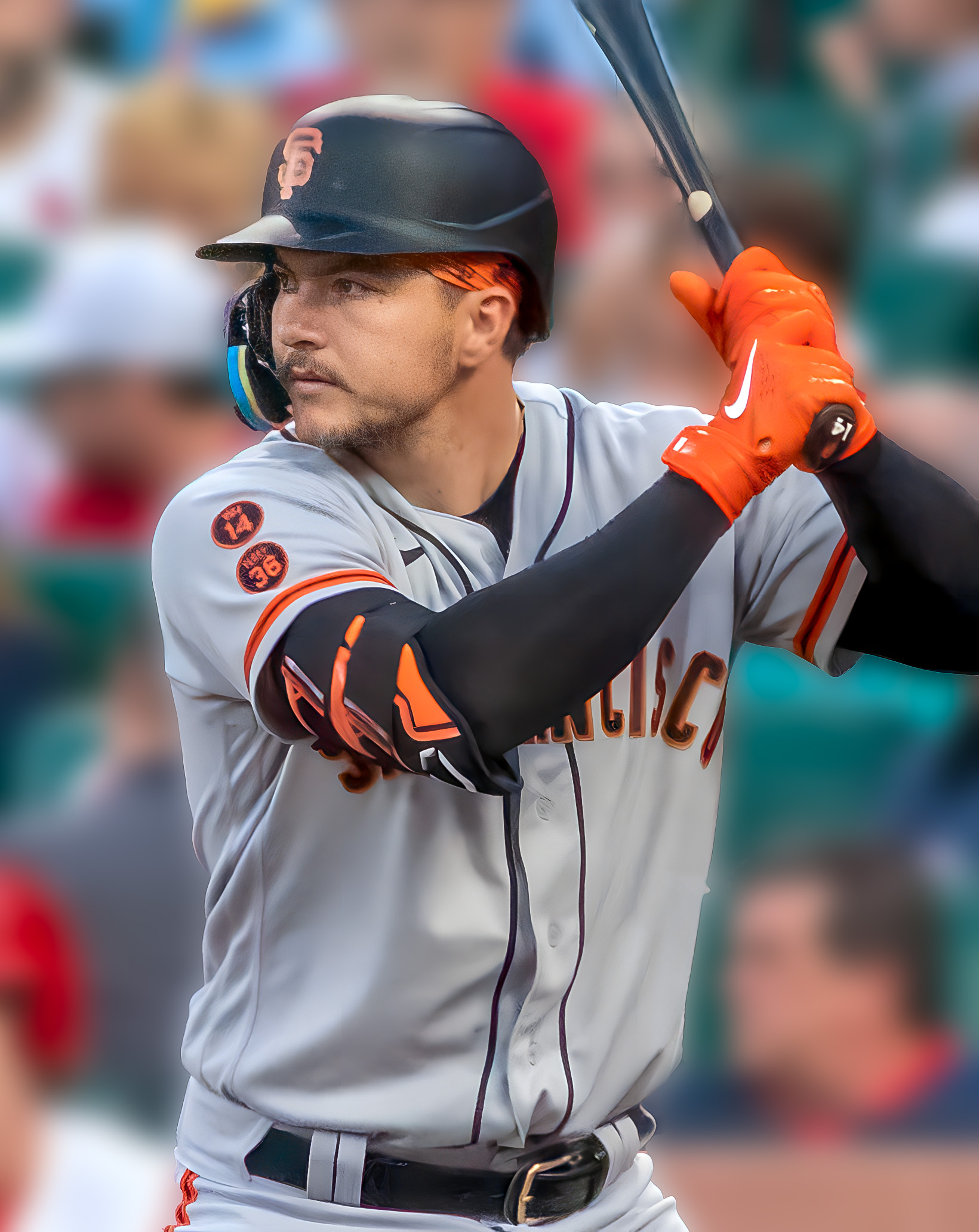
Bailey in 2023

On May 19, 2023, Bailey was selected to the 40-man roster and promoted to the major leagues for the first time. On May 21, Bailey hit his first major league home run in a 7–5 win over the Miami Marlins. On August 1, Bailey – after entering the prior inning as a defensive replacement – ended a game with a walk-off pick-off from his knees, catching Diamondback Geraldo Perdomo on first base with two outs in the ninth inning in a one-run game, with the fastest pop time (1.39 seconds) to first base on a successful pickoff throw in the Statcast era (since 2015). On August 13, he caught Ezequiel Duran of Texas trying to steal, to send the game into extra innings, with the fastest pop time (1.71 seconds) to second base recorded by an MLB catcher so far in 2023; it was the fastest pop time to second base by a Giants catcher under Statcast (from 2015), and he had each of the top 14 pop times on that list.

In 2024, Bailey won his first Gold Glove Award as a catcher in the National League. He is the fourth catcher to win the Gold Glove for the Giants. He won the award that year along with his teammate, third baseman Matt Chapman.

On July 8, 2025, in a game against the Philadelphia Phillies, Bailey hit a walk-off inside-the-park home run off closer Jordan Romano. This was the first walk-off inside-the-park home run by a Giant since Ángel Pagán's similar hit in 2013, and the first by a catcher since Bennie Tate's in 1926. On September 12, in a game against the Los Angeles Dodgers, Bailey hit a walk-off grand slam home run off closer Tanner Scott. This was the first walk-off grand slam by a Giant since Jack Hiatt's similar hit in 1969. With those two homers in those two games, Bailey became the first player in MLB history to record a walk-off inside-the-park home run and a walk-off grand slam in a season.

Bailey finished the 2025 season batting .222/.277/.325 in 135 games. Defensively, he led all MLB catchers with 19 defensive runs saved. On November 2, 2025, Bailey was awarded his second career Gold Glove Award for National League catchers.

On April 22, 2026, Bailey hit a game winning three–run home run against the Los Angeles Dodgers. He appeared in 30 games for San Francisco, slashing .146/.213/.183 with one home run, five RBI, and two stolen bases.

=== Cleveland Guardians (2026–present) ===
On May 9, 2026, the Giants traded Bailey to the Cleveland Guardians in exchange for Matt Wilkinson and a compensatory draft pick in the 2026 MLB draft. Bailey played in 82 games with Cleveland batted .228 with nine home runs and 32 RBI. He was named to the Guardians' playoff roster and made his postseason debut in the 2026 American League Division Series.

== Personal life ==
Bailey is married to his college sweetheart, Leigha Bruce. They have two children, a daughter and a son.
