= Andrew Knapp =

American baseball player (born 1991)

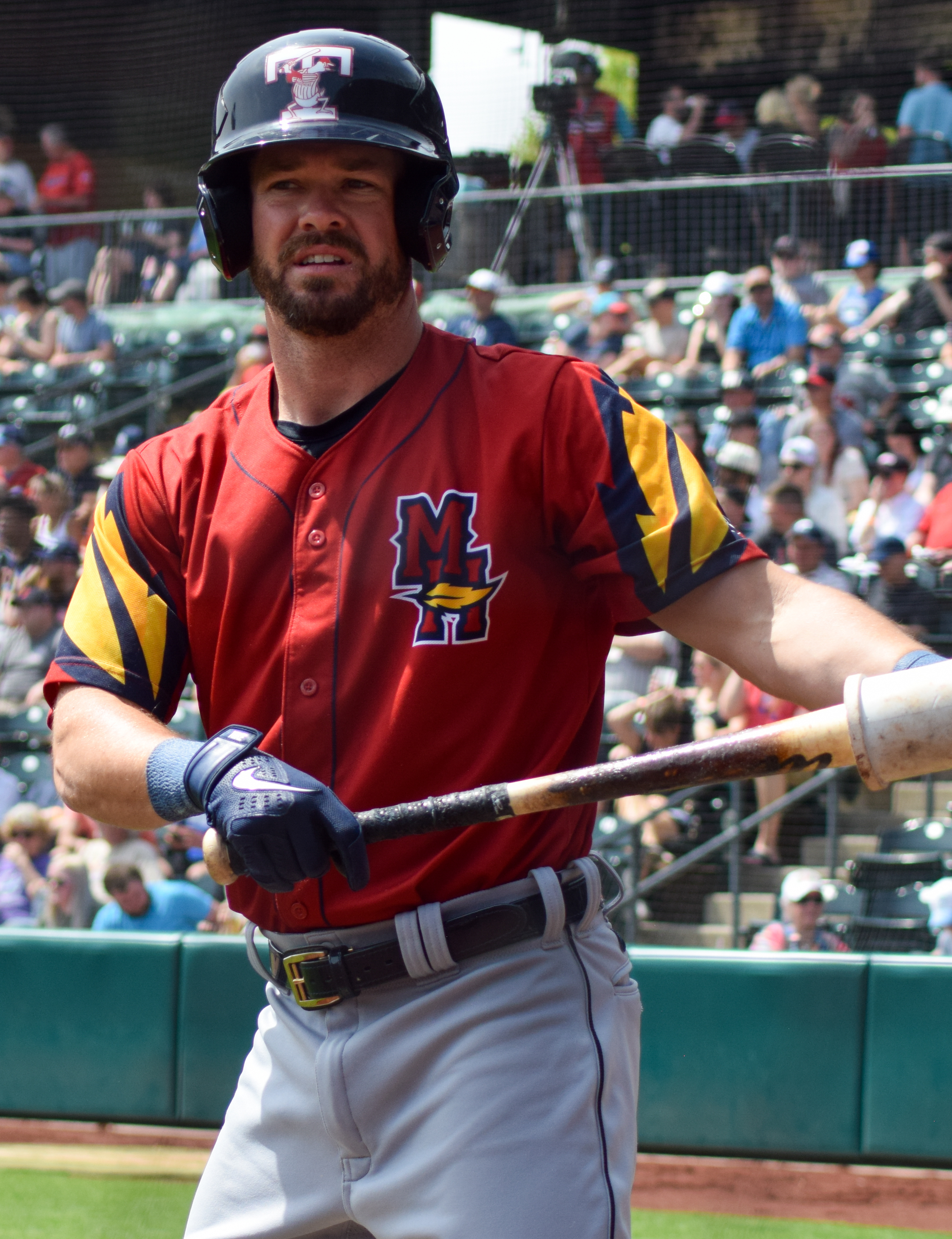
- Knapp with the Toledo Mud Hens in 2023
- Catcher
- Born: November 9, 1991 (age 35); Roseville, California, U.S.
- Batted: Switch Threw: Right

MLB debut
- April 6, 2017, for the Philadelphia Phillies

Last MLB appearance
- August 28, 2024, for the San Francisco Giants

MLB statistics
- Batting average: .209
- Home runs: 13
- Runs batted in: 66
- Stats at Baseball Reference

Teams
- Philadelphia Phillies (2017–2021); Pittsburgh Pirates (2022); Seattle Mariners (2022); San Francisco Giants (2022, 2024)

Andrew Michael Knapp (born November 9, 1991) is an American former professional baseball catcher. He played in Major League Baseball (MLB) for the Philadelphia Phillies, Pittsburgh Pirates, Seattle Mariners, Texas Rangers, and San Francisco Giants. He played college baseball for the University of California, Berkeley, and was selected by the Phillies in the second round of the 2013 MLB draft.

A switch hitter, Knapp ascended through the Phillies' minor league system in four seasons, winning the organization's award for best minor league player in 2015. He made his MLB debut in 2017 and served as the team's primary backup catcher for five seasons.

== Early life ==
Knapp was born in Roseville, California, and attended Granite Bay High School in Granite Bay, California. During his childhood, he followed his father Mike, a minor league catcher, across the country, visiting 38 states by the time he was five years old and living in at least six of them. Though Mike never pushed his sons towards baseball, both played and excelled. Mike, who never made the major leagues, was a right-handed hitter, which he attributes as part of the reason he never broke in at the big-league level. Andrew started hitting left-handed—and eventually as a switch hitter—at the suggestion of his mother, who wanted her son to avoid her husband's fate.

After a successful high school career, Knapp was drafted by the Oakland Athletics in the 41st round of the 2010 Major League Baseball draft, but he did not sign. Instead, he attended the University of California, Berkeley, to play college baseball in the Pac-12 Conference. After struggling throughout his first two seasons, Knapp began to break through during his junior year, when he became a full-time catcher. That season, Knapp was third in the conference with a .350 batting average, tied for third with a .544 slugging percentage, ranked fourth with a .434 on-base percentage, and hit eight home runs.

Over three seasons, he hit .294, with 14 home runs, and 82 runs batted in (RBIs) for the California Golden Bears baseball team. In 2012, he played collegiate summer baseball with the Chatham Anglers of the Cape Cod Baseball League, and was named a league all-star. Entering the 2013 MLB draft, Knapp was viewed as "headlin[ing] the second tier of catchers in this year's class", with scout Mike Rosenbaum projecting that he could be a slightly above-average hitter and defender with average power and an above-average throwing arm.

== Professional career ==
=== Philadelphia Phillies ===
==== Minor leagues ====
Knapp was drafted by the Philadelphia Phillies in the second round of the 2013 MLB draft and signed with the Phillies for a $1,033,100 signing bonus. He made his professional debut with the Williamsport Crosscutters where he posted a .253 batting average with 20 doubles (tied for the league lead), four home runs, and 23 RBIs in 62 games. He spent 2014 with both the Lakewood BlueClaws and Clearwater Threshers, hitting a combined .260/.324/.385 with six home runs and 32 RBIs in 98 games and was named an MiLB.com Organization All Star.

Knapp started 2015 with Clearwater where he was a mid-season FSL All Star, and was promoted to the Reading Fightin Phils during the season. He hit a combined .308/.385/.491 with 13 home runs and 84 RBIs in 118 total games between the two teams. For his performance in 2015, he won the Paul Owens Award, which the Phillies' organization awards to its best minor league player each season.

Knapp spent 2016 with the Lehigh Valley IronPigs, and his offensive performance "tapered off". Knapp did, however, take strides defensively, which at the time was viewed as an area of relative weakness that he would need to improve to have a chance at the major league level. He ended the season with a .266 batting average, eight home runs, and 46 RBIs in 107 games. He was named an International League mid-season All Star. After the season, he played in the Dominican Winter League.

==== Major leagues ====
"Going back to double A, he was the best hitter I had ever seen in pro ball. He was lights out in double A and that was consistency and being able to see pitches every day. Everybody knows his offense can be there. A great thing about Knappy is he cares a lot more about the pitch calling and defensive catching than he does hitting. I’m not saying he doesn’t care about hitting, but his main goal is to be a catcher that pitchers trust. He’s absolutely rocked that leadership role but we’re all excited to see him swing the bat because we know what he can be."
— Phillies starting pitcher Zach Eflin

The Phillies added Knapp to their 40-man roster after the 2016 season, and he ultimately made the Phillies' 2017 Opening Day roster, spending the whole season at the major league level as a backup catcher to Cameron Rupp as the Phillies awaited the arrival of higher-regarded prospect Jorge Alfaro. As the year went on, his playing time increased and his role evolved into more of a timeshare with Rupp. For the season, he batted .257/.368/.368 with three home runs and 13 RBIs in 56 games (171 at bats). He threw out 20 percent of attempted base stealers. During the offseason, after the death of former Phillies Cy Young Award-winning pitcher Roy Halladay, Knapp changed his number from Halladay's former 34 to 15, the number Knapp had worn in college, to honor Halladay.

Knapp again battled for the backup catcher position entering 2018 and, again, made the opening day roster, this time as a backup to Alfaro. Knapp did, however, make his first career opening day start. On July 1, 2018, Knapp hit the team’s first walk-off home run since 2016, a 13th inning blast against the Washington Nationals. Despite his paltry overall hitting performance—a .198 batting average with four home runs and 15 RBIs in 187 at bats—the team began to value Knapp's defensive and game management skills along with his ability to get on base.

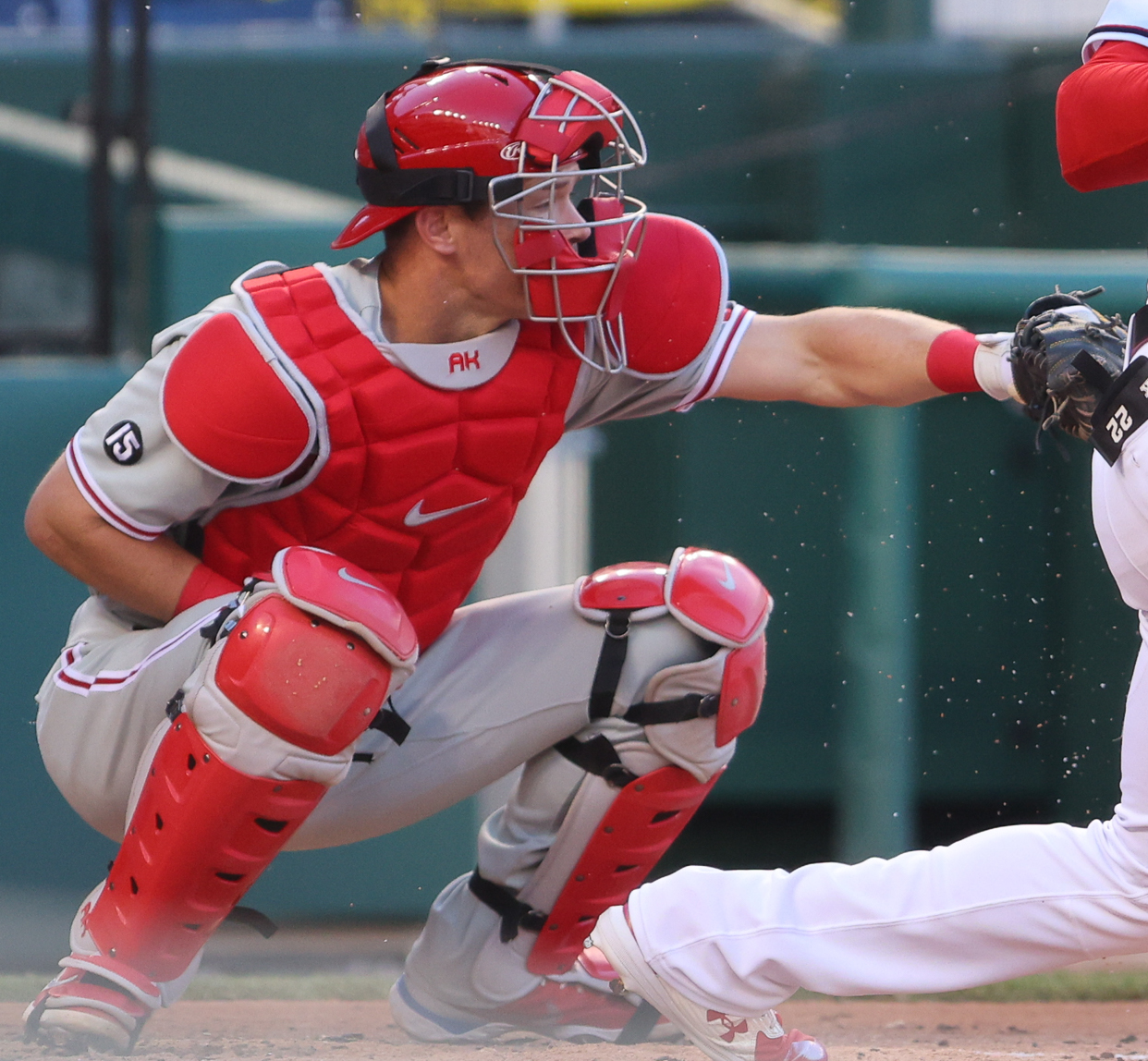
Knapp in 2021

During the offseason prior to the Phillies' 2019 campaign, they acquired J. T. Realmuto in exchange for a package of prospects that included Alfaro, again opening a clear path for Knapp to start the season as the team's backup catcher. He did, once again spending the season as the team's primary backup catcher. Although he continued to struggle offensively, Phillies' management expressed comfort with keeping Knapp as Realmuto's backup moving forward. Overall in 2019, he batted .213/.318/.324 with two home runs and eight RBIs in 136 at bats, but he closed the season on a high note, hitting .290 during the last nine games of the season. He also threw out a career-best 29 percent of attempted base stealers.

The Phillies' catching situation remained unchanged entering spring training in 2020, with Knapp projected to serve as Realmuto's backup, and that eventually was the case once the season began in July after a delay due to the COVID-19 pandemic. During the shortened season, all teams used a designated hitter (DH), which allowed Knapp to have expanded playing time as Realmuto could occasionally serve as DH while reducing the strain on him to catch every day. Knapp ultimately played 33 of 60 games during the shortened season, hitting a career-best .278 with two home runs and 15 RBIs. His performance led Philadelphia Inquirer columnist Bob Brookover to suggest he was the best backup catcher in baseball (a corollary to the Phillies' mantra that Realmuto is the "best catcher in baseball"). In August, when the Phillies retired the number of Dick Allen, Knapp again switched his number, this time from Allen's 15 to 7.

Knapp entered 2021 poised to continue his role as Realmuto's backup, though with uncertainty throughout the offseason about whether Realmuto would re-sign with the team or would be ready for opening day after suffering a thumb injury, Knapp prepared to play an expanded role. In his first at-bat of the season, on April 4, Knapp hit the Phillies' first home run of the season.

In the 2021 season he batted a career-low .152. His .429 OPS was the second-lowest OPS among catchers who had at least 50 plate appearances. He struck 38% of the time, a career worst, and threw out only 2 of 22 attempted base stealers. On November 5, 2021, the Phillies outrighted Knapp off of the 40-man roster and he became a free agent.

=== Cincinnati Reds ===
On December 1, 2021, Knapp signed a minor league contract with the Cincinnati Reds. Knapp was released by the Reds organization on April 5, 2022.

=== Pittsburgh Pirates ===
On April 5, 2022, the same day as his release from the Reds, Knapp signed a major league contract with the Pittsburgh Pirates to serve as the team's backup catcher. Knapp appeared in 11 games for the Pirates, slashing .129/.229/.161 with no home runs and 2 RBI. Knapp was designated by assignment by the Pirates on May 16 following the acquisition of Tyler Heineman. He cleared outright waivers and elected free agency on May 19, 2022.

=== Seattle Mariners ===
On May 21, 2022, Knapp signed a minor league contract with the Seattle Mariners and was assigned to the Tacoma Rainiers of the Triple-A Pacific Coast League. On June 27, Knapp was selected by the Mariners to be the backup catcher to Cal Raleigh.

On July 9, 2022, Knapp was designated for assignment. He was released on July 13.

=== San Francisco Giants ===
On July 22, 2022, Knapp signed a minor league deal with the San Francisco Giants. On August 31, Knapp's contract was selected from the Triple-A Sacramento River Cats, after batting .312/.373/.634 with the club in 102 plate appearances. Knapp was designated for assignment on September 6. He cleared waivers and was sent outright to Sacramento on September 8. He elected free agency following the season on October 6.

=== Detroit Tigers ===
On December 23, 2022, Knapp signed a minor league deal with the Detroit Tigers. In 70 games for the Triple–A Toledo Mud Hens, he batted .253/.337/.397 with 6 home runs and 25 RBI. On August 9, 2023, Knapp was released by the Tigers organization.

=== Houston Astros ===
On August 16, 2023, Knapp signed a minor league contract with the Houston Astros organization. In 23 games for the Triple–A Sugar Land Space Cowboys, he hit .171/.300/.316 with 3 home runs and 4 RBI. Knapp elected free agency following the season on November 6.

=== Texas Rangers ===
On December 27, 2023, Knapp signed a minor league contract with the Texas Rangers. In 60 games for the Triple–A Round Rock Express, he batted .292/.374/.444 with six home runs and 30 RBI. On July 1, 2024, Knapp was released from his minor league contract after exercising an opt–out clause. He re-signed with Texas on a new minor league contract on July 12, but was released on August 22.

=== San Francisco Giants (second stint) ===
On August 23, 2024, Knapp signed a one-year major league contract with the San Francisco Giants. He went 1–for–6 (.167) in 3 games for the Giants. On August 29, Knapp was designated for assignment by San Francisco. He cleared waivers and was sent outright to the Triple–A Sacramento River Cats on August 31. Knapp elected free agency on October 1.

On January 20, 2025, Knapp announced his retirement from professional baseball.

== Player profile ==
Despite posting outstanding statistics at the minor league level and initially being viewed as an offense-first prospect, Knapp has always been seen primarily as a backup or situational catcher at the major league level, primarily due to his struggles as a hitter. But Knapp quickly asserted himself as a defender and game caller, earning the trust of the pitching staff, who often posted better numbers when Knapp was catching. In time, Knapp has improved in terms of his ability to get on base, particularly through walks and limiting strikeouts, until 2021.

Over the course of his first several seasons at the major league level, Knapp often started on days when Zach Eflin pitched. Knapp and Eflin had worked together since the Double-A level and developed a strong rapport—Eflin's performance as a pitcher was appreciably stronger with Knapp behind the plate. Knapp was viewed as a leader in the Phillies' clubhouse and has the respect of teammates including Bryce Harper, who said during spring training in 2021, "I know everybody talks about Knapp and the way he hits or whatever, but that guy – to have a backup catcher like Knapp, he’s so good with the pitchers. The way he calls games, the way he frames – so much goes into it. He's so good back there."

== Personal life ==
Knapp married Hannah Hughes in November 2018. His father, Mike Knapp, played 11 years of minor league baseball, and his brother and former teammate at UC Berkeley, Aaron Knapp, was an eighth-round draft pick of the Miami Marlins in 2016. Aaron reached as high as the Triple-A level of the Seattle Mariners organization, where he last played in 2019.
