= Sixto Sánchez =

Dominican baseball player (born 1998)

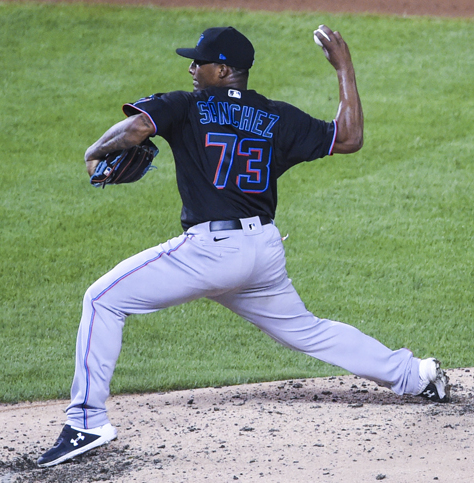
- Sánchez with the Miami Marlins in 2020

Free agent
- Pitcher
- Born: July 29, 1998 (age 28); San Cristóbal, Dominican Republic
- Bats: Right Throws: Right

MLB debut
- August 22, 2020, for the Miami Marlins

MLB statistics (through 2024 season)
- Win–loss record: 3–5
- Earned run average: 4.70
- Strikeouts: 50
- Stats at Baseball Reference

Teams
- Miami Marlins (2020, 2024)

Sixto Sánchez Encarnación (born July 29, 1998) is a Dominican professional baseball pitcher who is a free agent. He has previously played in Major League Baseball (MLB) for the Miami Marlins.

== Early life ==
Sánchez was born in San Cristóbal, Dominican Republic. He played shortstop as a youth.

== Career ==
=== Philadelphia Phillies ===
The Philadelphia Phillies happened upon Sánchez when they saw him throwing batting practice at a workout for a Cuban catcher the Phillies were scouting in 2014. He signed with the Phillies for a $35,000 signing bonus as an international free agent in February 2015. He made his professional debut as a pitcher that year with the Dominican Summer League Phillies. He had 1–2 win–loss record with a 4.56 earned run average. He pitched in 2016 with the Rookie Gulf Coast Phillies. He was 5–0 (tied for 4th in the Gulf Coast League in wins) with an 0.50 ERA, a WHIP of 0.759, and a 5.50 strikeout-to-walk ratio. At 17 years of age, his fastball was 97-98 mph. He was named both a Baseball America Rookie All Star, and a Gulf Coast League Post-Season All Star. Baseball America named him the Number 80 prospect in baseball.

Sánchez started 2017 with the Single–A Lakewood BlueClaws, and was promoted to the High–A Clearwater Threshers during the season, with whom he was the youngest pitcher in the Florida State League. On July 30 he was named South Atlantic League Pitcher of the Week. He threw a fastball in the high 90s that reached 102 mph. Between the two teams he was 5–7 with a 3.03 ERA, a WHIP of 0.958, and a 4.67 strikeout-to-walk ratio. Baseball America named him the Number 25 prospect in baseball, MLB.com ranked him as the Number 26 prospect, and MLB Pipeline named him the No. 47 prospect.

Sánchez entered 2018 as the Phillies number one prospect and one of the top prospects overall in the minors, pitching again for Clearwater. He has been compared to Pedro Martinez. On June 3 he was named Florida State League Pitcher of the Week, and he was named a Florida State League Mid-Season All Star. The Phillies shut him down after June 3 due to right elbow inflammation. He was 4–3 with a 2.51 ERA, and a 4.09 strikeout-to-walk ratio. Baseball America named him the Number 13 prospect in baseball, MLB Pipeline named him the No. 21 prospect, and Baseball Prospectus ranked him as the Number 23 prospect.

=== Miami Marlins ===
On February 7, 2019, Sánchez was traded with Jorge Alfaro, Will Stewart, and $250,000 in international bonus slot money to the Miami Marlins in exchange for J. T. Realmuto. He began the 2019 season with the Jacksonville Jumbo Shrimp. Sánchez was named to the 2019 All-Star Futures Game. In 2019 between Jacksonville and the High–A Jupiter Hammerheads he was 8–6 with a 2.76 ERA in 20 starts (114 innings). On November 20, 2019, the Marlins added Sánchez to their 40–man roster to protect him from the Rule 5 draft.

On August 20, 2020, Sánchez was promoted to the major leagues for the first time. He made his major league debut on August 22, and notched his first career win. Sánchez completed the season with a 3–2 record, and a 3.46 ERA over 39 innings. On October 2, Sánchez made his postseason debut, going for 5 innings, while allowing no earned runs. Sánchez received a single vote in National League Rookie of the Year voting, tying him for seventh place with Ian Anderson and Andrés Giménez.

On July 5, 2021, Sánchez underwent season-ending surgery after an MRI revealed a small tear in the posterior capsule of his right shoulder. He did not make any appearances for the Marlins organization in 2021 due to the injury. Sánchez did not make an appearance for any Miami affiliate during the 2022 season as he recovered from surgery. On October 5, 2022, he underwent surgery for right shoulder arthroscopic bursectomy.

Sánchez was optioned to the Triple-A Jacksonville Jumbo Shrimp to begin the 2023 season. However, he only appeared in one rehab game for the Double–A Pensacola Blue Wahoos in September, and did not pitch in another game on the year.

On March 22, 2024, manager Skip Schumaker announced that Sánchez had made Miami's Opening Day roster. In 14 games for Miami, he posted an 0–3 record and 6.06 ERA with 17 strikeouts across 35 2/3 innings pitched. Sánchez was placed on the injured list with right shoulder inflammation on June 2, and transferred to the 60–day injured list on June 25. On November 4, Sánchez was removed from the 40–man roster and sent outright to Jacksonville, but he rejected the assignment and elected free agency.

=== Rieleros de Aguascalientes ===
On February 26, 2025, Sánchez signed with the Rieleros de Aguascalientes of the Mexican League. He was released prior to the start of the season.
