= Will Stewart (baseball) =

American baseball player (born 1997)

Free agent
- Pitcher
- Born: July 14, 1997 (age 28); Huntsville, Alabama, U.S.
- Bats: Left Throws: Left
- Stats at Baseball Reference

William A. Stewart (born July 14, 1997) is an American professional baseball pitcher who is a free agent.

== Career ==
=== Philadelphia Phillies ===
Stewart attended Hazel Green High School in Hazel Green, Alabama. The Philadelphia Phillies selected Stewart in the 20th round, with the 694th overall selection, of the 2015 Major League Baseball draft. He signed with the Phillies, forgoing his commitment to play college baseball at Wallace State Community College.

After signing, Stewart was assigned to the Gulf Coast League Phillies where he went 1–0 with a 4.79 ERA over 20 2/3 relief innings pitched. He returned to the GCL in 2016, pitching to a 2–3 record and 4.06 ERA in 11 games (seven starts), and in 2017, he played with the Williamsport Crosscutters of the Low–A New York-Penn League where he posted a 4–2 record with a 4.18 ERA in 13 starts. In 2018, he pitched for the Lakewood BlueClaws of the Single–A South Atlantic League, where he was named a South Atlantic League All-Star. In twenty starts for the season, he pitched to an 8–1 record with a 2.06 ERA and a 0.98 WHIP.

=== Miami Marlins ===
On February 7, 2019, the Phillies traded Stewart, Jorge Alfaro, Sixto Sanchez, and $250,000 of international signing bonus pool money to the Miami Marlins for J. T. Realmuto. He spent the 2019 season with the Jupiter Hammerheads of the High–A Florida State League, going 6–12 with a 5.43 ERA over 23 games (21 starts). He did not play in a game in 2020 due to the cancellation of the minor league season because of the COVID-19 pandemic. Stewart spent the 2021 season with the Double–A Pensacola Blue Wahoos, going 5–8 with a 4.33 ERA and 85 strikeouts over 99 2/3 innings.

In 2022, Stewart played for Pensacola and the Triple–A Jacksonville Jumbo Shrimp, logging a combined 7–6 record and 5.27 ERA with 83 strikeouts in 95 2/3 innings pitched. He split the 2023 season between Jacksonville, Pensacola, and the High–A Beloit Snappers. In 21 combined relief outings, Stewart accumulated a 3.15 ERA with 24 strikeouts across 34 1/3 innings of work. He elected free agency following the season on November 6, 2023.

=== York Revolution ===
On April 9, 2024, Stewart signed with the York Revolution of the Atlantic League of Professional Baseball. In 20 games (7 starts) for York, he compiled a 1–4 record and 7.90 ERA with 53 strikeouts over 49 innings of work. Stewart was released by the Revolution on August 18.
