= J. T. Realmuto =

American baseball player (born 1991)

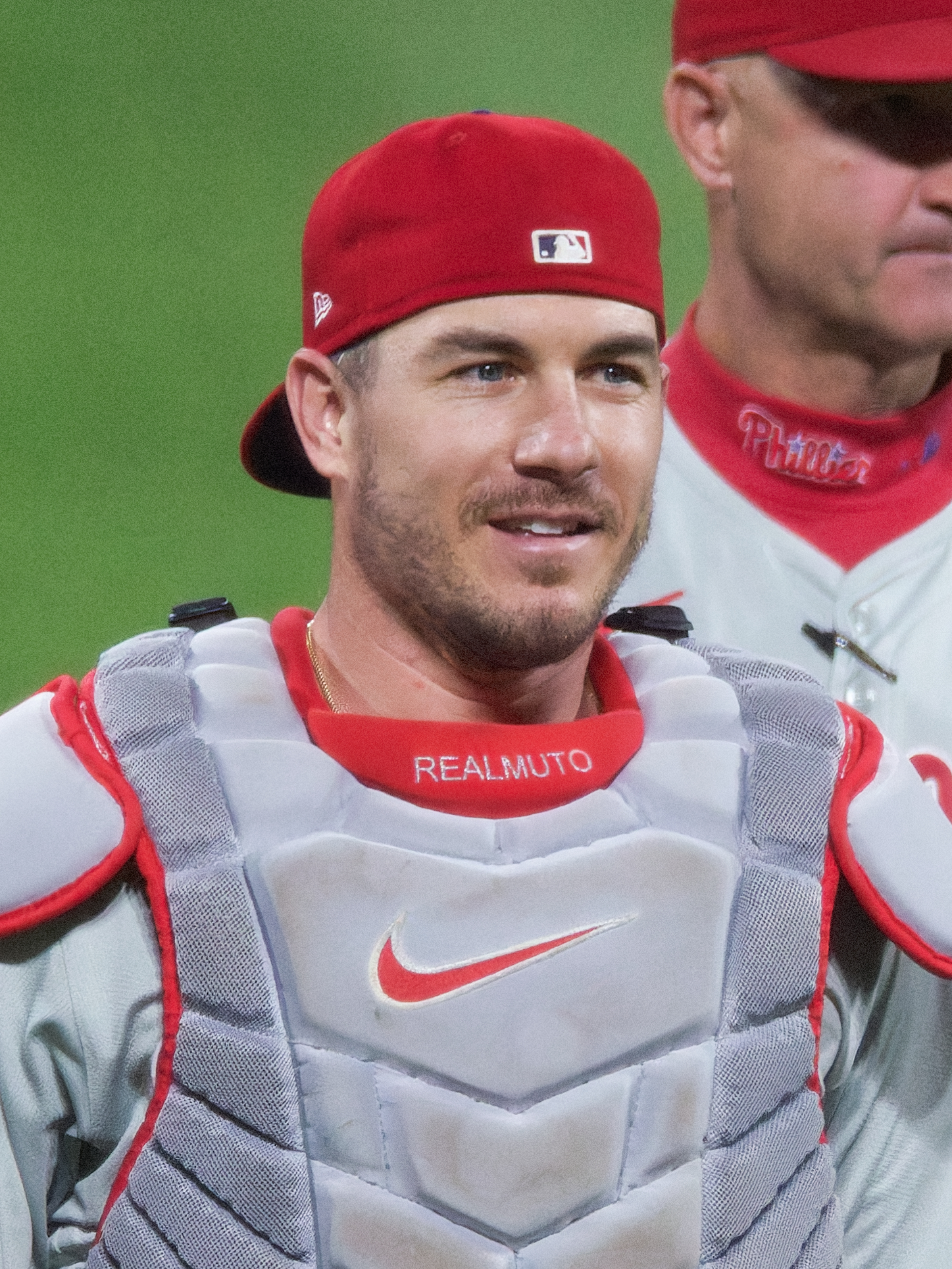
- Realmuto with the Philadelphia Phillies in 2024

Philadelphia Phillies – No. 10
- Catcher
- Born: March 18, 1991 (age 35); Del City, Oklahoma, U.S.
- Bats: Right Throws: Right

MLB debut
- June 5, 2014, for the Miami Marlins

MLB statistics (through 2026 season)
- Batting average: .266
- Hits: 1,451
- Home runs: 191
- Runs batted in: 728
- Stats at Baseball Reference

Teams
- Miami Marlins (2014–2018); Philadelphia Phillies (2019–present)

Career highlights and awards
- 3× All-Star (2018, 2019, 2021); 2× All-MLB First Team (2019, 2022); 2× Gold Glove Award (2019, 2022); 3× Silver Slugger Award (2018, 2019, 2022)
Medals
Men's baseball
Representing United States
World Baseball Classic
Silver medal – second place	2023 Miami	Team

Jacob Tyler Realmuto (/riːlmjuːtoʊ/ reel-MEW-toh; born March 18, 1991) is an American professional baseball catcher for the Philadelphia Phillies of Major League Baseball (MLB). He has previously played in MLB for the Miami Marlins. Internationally, Realmuto represented the United States in 2023.

Realmuto was born in Del City, Oklahoma, into an athletic family. He played various sports as he grew up, helping both the baseball and football teams of Carl Albert High School win state championship titles. Although he served as the baseball team's shortstop throughout his high school career, a scout for the Miami Marlins encouraged Realmuto to become a full-time catcher. The Marlins selected him in the third round of the 2010 MLB draft, and Realmuto chose to sign with the team rather than honor a commitment to playing college baseball at Oklahoma State. He spent the next several seasons in the Marlins' farm system, building strong relationships with pitchers and working on picking off attempted base stealers.

After starting catcher Jarrod Saltalamacchia suffered a concussion, Realmuto made his MLB debut in June 2014. His major league appearances were brief until 2015, when Saltalamacchia was designated for assignment and Realmuto replaced him as the Marlins' starting catcher. Realmuto's strength and speed, both as a catcher and batter, helped take him to his first All-Star appearance in 2018. That same year, Realmuto won his first Silver Slugger Award.

The Marlins traded Realmuto to the Phillies in February 2019, and he received his second All-Star and Silver Slugger awards that year. Additionally, Realmuto received his first career Gold Glove Award for his performance in the 2019 season. When he became a free agent after the 2020 season, Realmuto's Phillies teammates and fans began using the phrase "Sign J. T." to pressure the Phillies into signing him to another contract. In January 2021, Realmuto and the Phillies agreed to a five-year, $115.5 million contract, the largest for any catcher in MLB history.

== Early life ==
Realmuto was born on March 18, 1991, in Del City, Oklahoma. His father played college baseball for Southwest Missouri State, and his older sisters Ryan and Amanda were college softball catchers for Oklahoma State and Northwestern State, respectively. Additionally, Realmuto's uncle, John Smith, was a two-time Olympic gold medal wrestler. Growing up, his parents were heavily involved in their children's athletics, with his father David coaching his older sisters' softball teams while Realmuto's mother, Margaret, often drove him to his Little League games and various other sporting matches. Realmuto was a multi-sport athlete from early childhood, having started playing baseball at the age of five and wrestling the following year. In fourth grade, he started playing basketball and football, then briefly played tennis in middle school.

During his high school career, Realmuto was a three-sport athlete for Carl Albert High School in Midwest City, Oklahoma. He played as the shortstop for the baseball team, the quarterback for the football team, and a power forward for the basketball team. During Realmuto's high school tenure, the Carl Albert baseball and football teams each won their respective state championship. As a senior in 2010, Realmuto set a national high school baseball record by recording 119 runs batted in (RBIs) in 42 games played during one season. His batting average for the season was .595, and he had 21 home runs, 22 doubles, and 88 hits. At the end of the year, the American Baseball Coaches Association (ABCA) named Realmuto their National Player of the Year, and he received All-American team selections from both the ABCA and Louisville Slugger. Realmuto also received the Bob Colon Scholarship, presented annually by The Oklahoman and the Jim Thorpe Association to the top male high school scholar-athlete in the greater Oklahoma City area.

== Minor league career ==
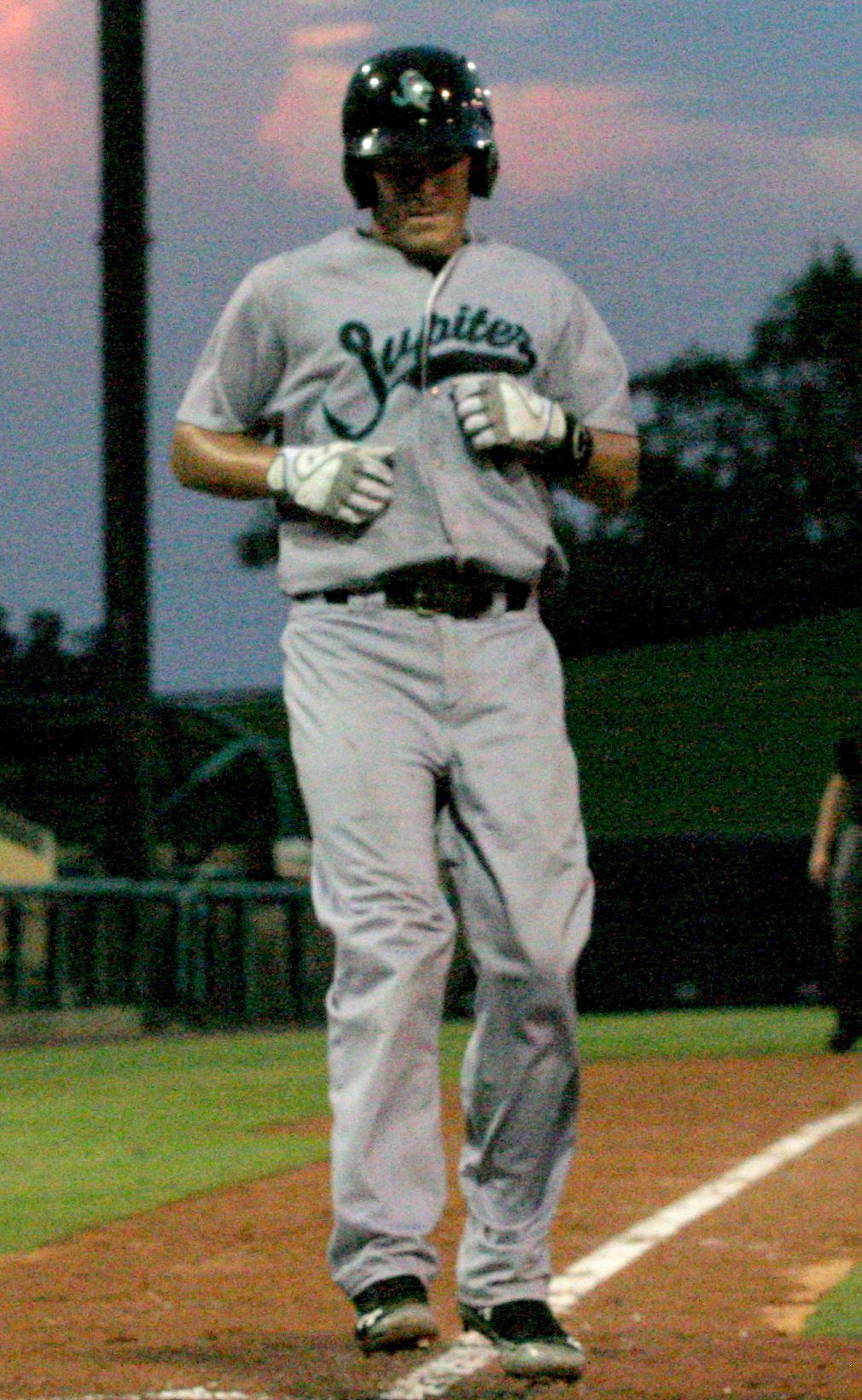
Realmuto with the Jupiter Hammerheads in 2012

Although he primarily played as the team's shortstop, Realmuto would occasionally catch for Carl Albert when their starting catcher was asked to pitch. Steve Taylor, a scout for the Miami Marlins of Major League Baseball (MLB), attended a game where Realmuto was catching and told the player that he was more likely to play in MLB as a catcher than as a shortstop. The Marlins went on to select Realmuto in the third round, 104th overall, of the 2010 MLB draft. Although he had previously committed to play college baseball at Oklahoma State on an athletic scholarship, Realmuto chose to accept the Marlins' offer, which included a $700,000 signing bonus. He was assigned to the GCL Marlins of the Rookie Gulf Coast League, where he batted .175 in 40 at-bats, with two runs and four RBIs.

Prior to the 2011 season, Marlins farm director Jim Fleming and scouting director Stan Meek pushed Andy Haines, then the manager of the Class A Greensboro Grasshoppers, to promote Realmuto to the team. He spent spring training working with Marlins catching instructor Tim Cossins and was assigned to the Grasshoppers to start the season. Realmuto split time behind the plate with Wilfredo Gimenez, and when he was not catching, he would appear as a designated hitter. He excelled both offensively and defensively in his 96 games with Greensboro; in addition to batting .287 with 12 home runs and 49 RBIs, Realmuto successfully picked off 42 percent of attempted base stealers. Realmuto also helped take the Grasshoppers to a South Atlantic League championship title, recording a critical RBI in the final round against the Savannah Sand Gnats.

The following season, both Realmuto and Haines were promoted to the Class A-Advanced Jupiter Hammerheads of the Florida State League. There, Realmuto was paired with up-and-coming pitcher José Fernández, a partnership that the Marlins envisioned would form the backbone of their future major league roster. Realmuto was one of three Hammerheads named to the 2012 Florida State League All-Star Game, alongside outfielders Christian Yelich and Marcell Ozuna. At the time, Realmuto had successfully picked off 37 percent of attempted base stealers and had allowed only three passed balls. Realmuto finished the 2012 season with a .256 average in 499 at-bats, including eight home runs, 46 RBIs, and 63 runs scored. After the conclusion of the Minor League Baseball season, Realmuto, Yelich, and Hammerheads pitcher Scott McGough were all selected to play for the Phoenix Desert Dogs of the Arizona Fall League. In his 14 fall games, Realmuto batted .222 with one home run, four RBIs, and two runs scored.

Fernández and Realmuto's paths diverged in 2013, when the former was promoted to the major leagues and the latter was assigned to the Double A Jacksonville Suns. Realmuto's season was hindered by frequent clashes with pitching coach John Duffy over pitch calling. His relationship with his teammates was stronger; relief pitcher Nick Wittgren praised the way in which Realmuto "makes pitchers feel comfortable". That year, Realmuto was one of nine Suns selected for the Southern League showcase. He played in 106 games for Jacksonville in 2013, hitting .239 with five home runs and 39 RBIs. That November, Realmuto was added to the Marlins' 40-man roster, in order to protect him from the Rule 5 draft.

Coming into the 2014 season, Baseball America named Realmuto the No. 10 prospect in the Marlins organization, as well as the "best defensive catcher" in the system. While Realmuto's coaches in Jacksonville pushed for the catcher to make the major league roster at the start of 2014, the Marlins elected to make their offseason acquisition Jarrod Saltalamacchia, an MLB veteran, the team's starting catcher rather than promoting a prospect. Realmuto began the 2014 season at Double A, where his batting dramatically improved. For the week ending April 20, Realmuto was named the Southern League's Offensive Player of the Week after scoring 10 runs in three multi-hit games while striking out only once in the process. Rather than focusing on advancing to the Marlins, Realmuto spent the season prioritizing forming bonds with the Jacksonville pitchers, such as Andrew Heaney. He was selected to his third minor league All-Star Game but did not appear due to a promotion. Realmuto appeared in 97 minor league games in 2014, batting .299 with eight home runs, 62 RBIs, and 66 runs scored in 423 at-bats. After they helped Jacksonville win the Southern League championship in 2014, both Realmuto and pitcher Justin Nicolino were named Postseason All-Stars by the league. The batterymates were additionally named the Marlins' Minor League Player and Pitcher of the Year, respectively.

== Major league career ==
=== Miami Marlins ===
==== 2014–15 ====
Realmuto received his first major league call-up on June 1, 2014, when Saltalamacchia was placed on the 7-day disabled list with a concussion. Marlins manager Mike Redmond told reporters that Realmuto was "the guy who, in the short term, we think [...] can come up and do a good job". Realmuto made his major league debut on June 5, recording three RBIs against Jake Odorizzi in an 11–6 rout of the Tampa Bay Rays. He was sent back down to Jacksonville after only seven games, in which he had collected one run and five RBIs. Realmuto was briefly called back up to the Marlins for three days at the end of July, but he did not play a game. On September 13, 2014, following Jacksonville's Southern League championship victory, Realmuto was recalled to the Marlins' expanded roster. He appeared in 11 total major league games that season, batting .241 with nine RBIs and four runs.

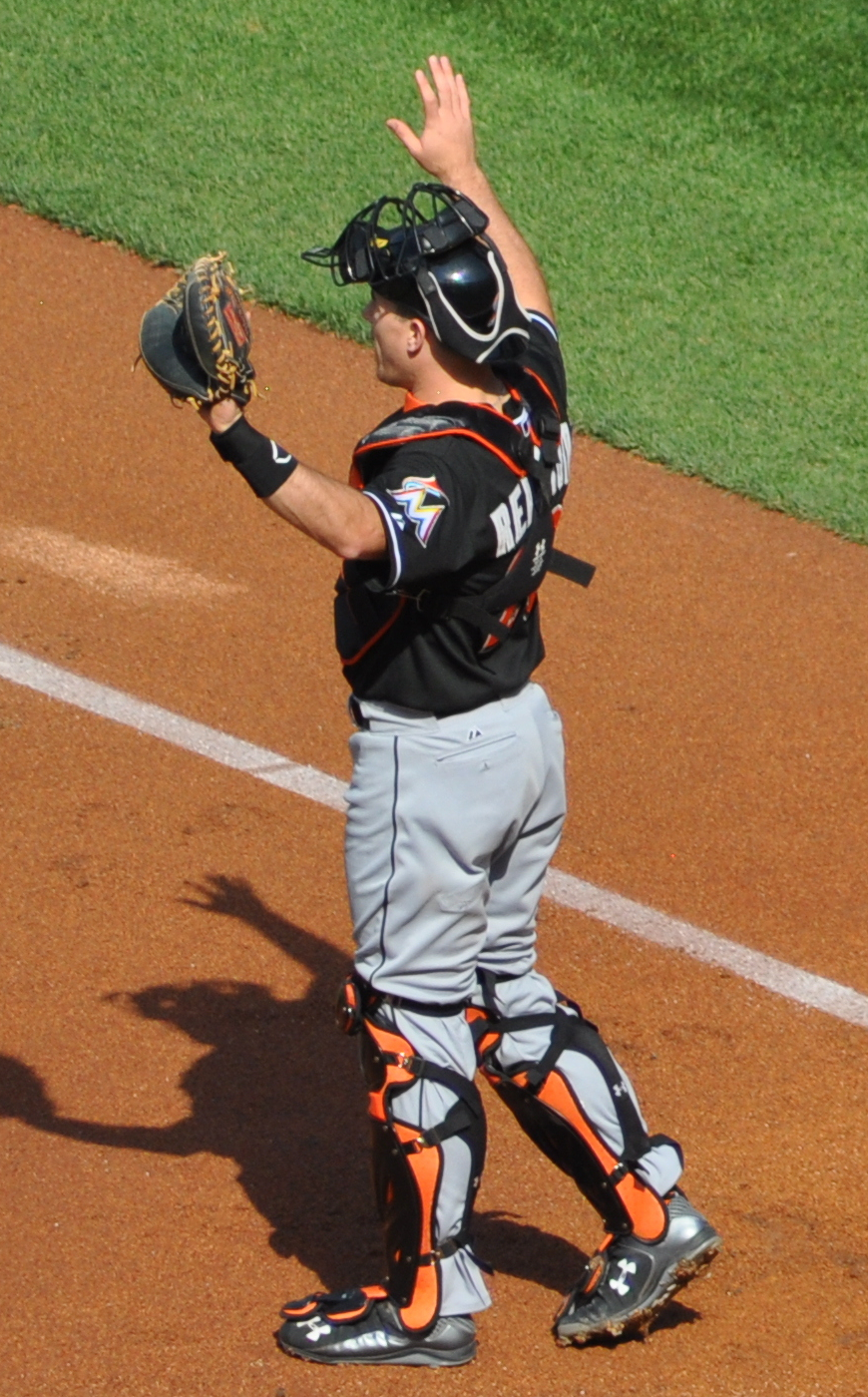
Realmuto with the Marlins in 2015

Realmuto joined the Marlins for spring training in 2015 but was assigned to the Triple A New Orleans Zephyrs to start the season. He spent three games there before being called up to replace an injured Jeff Mathis. Realmuto was meant to serve as a backup catcher to Saltalamacchia, with several opportunities to start behind the plate as Mathis waited four to six weeks for his fractured finger to heal. Saltalamacchia was designated for assignment on April 27, following an extended offensive and defensive slump, and Realmuto was named the Marlins' starting catcher. He hit his first major league home run the following month, a two-run shot against Rubby De La Rosa in the seventh inning of a 3–2 loss to the Arizona Diamondbacks on May 18, 2015. His first multi-home run game came on September 8, 2015, in a 6–4 win against the Milwaukee Brewers. The second home run of the night was inside the park, making Realmuto the third player in Marlins history to score both an outside- and inside-the-park home run in the same game, and the second to hit an inside-the-park home run at Marlins Park. Realmuto batted .259 in his first full major league season, with 10 home runs, 47 RBIs, and 49 runs scored in 467 at-bats. In addition to setting the Marlins' rookie hit record with 114, Realmuto also recorded seven triples, the most by any first-year catcher since 1972. At the end of the season, Realmuto was named the Marlins' Rookie of the Year.

==== 2016–17 ====
Although Realmuto excelled in making throws as a rookie, he led the league in errors worth 10, and he struggled with framing pitches, and he spent the 2015–16 offseason learning how best to move out-of-zone pitches to called strikes. He continued to maintain his offensive output into the start of the 2016 season, batting around .300 by mid-June. He was utilized in multiple positions within the batting order, including seven games as a leadoff batter due to Dee Gordon's suspension. His strong batting continued through the season, with a hitting streak of seven consecutive at bats at the start of July, but Realmuto continued to struggle defensively, committing seven errors before the MLB All-Star break. He batted .303 for the season, with 11 home runs, 48 RBIs, and 60 runs scored in 545 at-bats for the Marlins.

With the offseason acquisition of backup catcher A. J. Ellis, the Marlins expressed interest in allowing Realmuto to play other positions during the 2017 season, such as first base. He was named the National League (NL) Player of the Week for the first week of the regular season after scoring six runs, including two home runs, in the first five games of the season. Later that year, Realmuto hit his second career inside-the-park home run, tying the game in an eventual 9–8 defeat of the Philadelphia Phillies on August 24. On the defensive end, Realmuto continued to improve his speed in throwing out base runners. On April 27, he threw the fastest-recorded pickoff in MLB history, catching Odúbel Herrera stealing in 1.38 seconds. Realmuto batted .278 in 2017, with 17 home runs, 65 RBIs, and 68 runs in 579 at-bats. At the end of the season, Realmuto won the Jeff Conine Award, given annually by the Miami chapter of the Baseball Writers' Association of America to the player "whose commitment to the game is embodied in his integrity and unselfish play". The Major League Baseball Players Alumni Association, meanwhile, named Realmuto the 2017 recipient of the Marlins' Heart & Hustle Award, given to the player from each team "who demonstrates a passion for the game of baseball and best embod[ies] the values, spirit, and tradition of the game".

==== 2018 ====
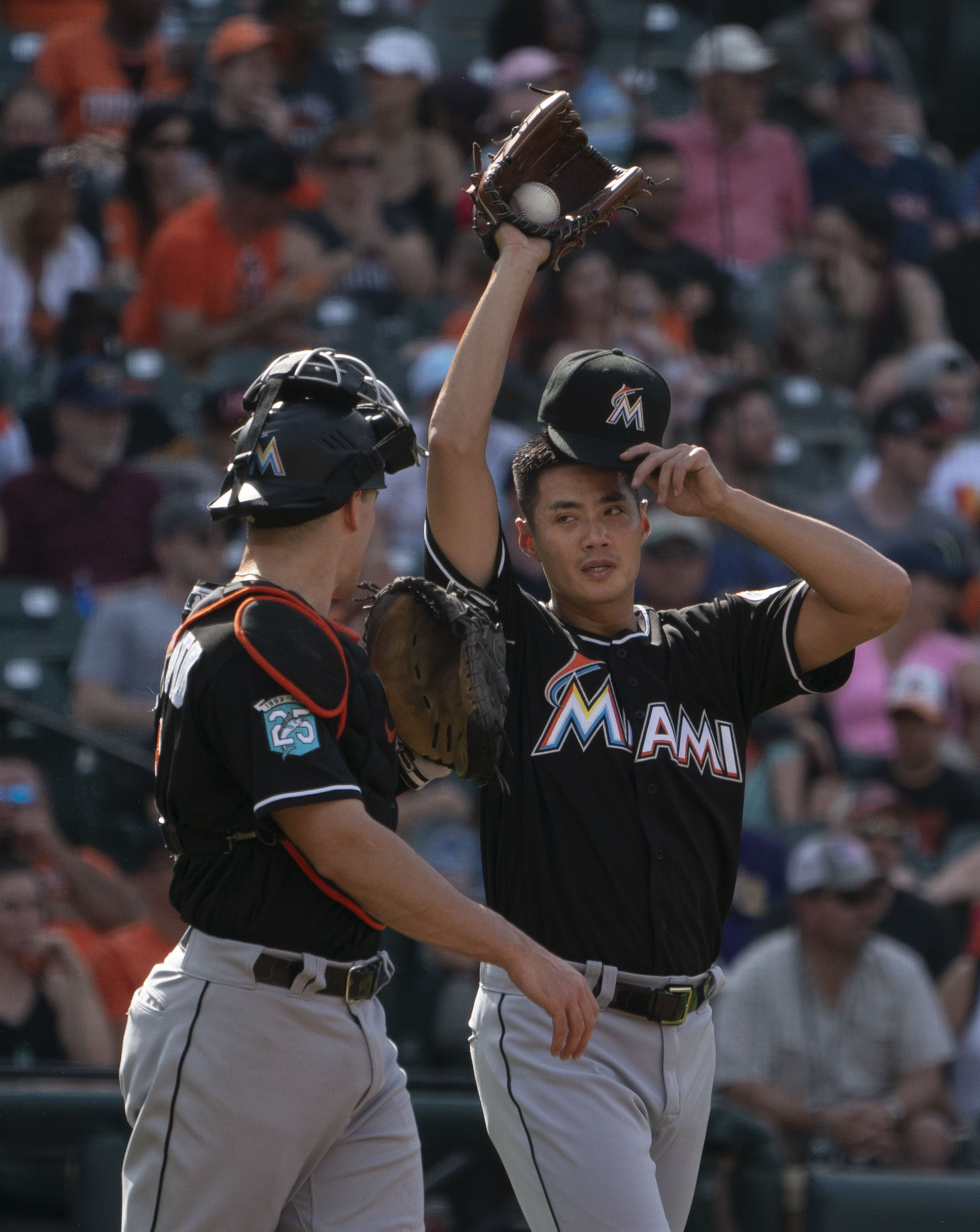
Realmuto and Wei-Yin Chen with the Marlins in 2018

Realmuto began the 2018 season on the disabled list after sustaining a bone bruise on his lower back. He suffered the injury during a spring training game against the New York Yankees, when he collided with Yankees second baseman Gleyber Torres. He was activated on April 17, one of the few remaining veterans due to new Marlins owner Derek Jeter's rebuilding process. Realmuto received his first All-Star Game selection in 2018, when he was the only Marlin selected by the league. He replaced Chicago Cubs catcher Willson Contreras in the sixth inning of the game and walked twice against the American League, but the NL lost in extra innings following a pair of back-to-back solo home runs from members of the Houston Astros. Realmuto finished the season with a .277 batting average, 21 home runs, 74 RBIs, and 74 runs scored in 531 at-bats. In addition to receiving his second consecutive Heart & Hustle award, Realmuto became the Marlins' Most Valuable Player in 2018. Realmuto was also the National League catcher selected for the 2018 Silver Slugger Award, given to the best offensive player at each position.

During the offseason, Realmuto appeared in the 2018 MLB Japan All-Star Series, scoring home runs in the second and third games of the series. Samurai Japan ultimately took the series in the sixth game.

=== Philadelphia Phillies ===
==== 2019 ====
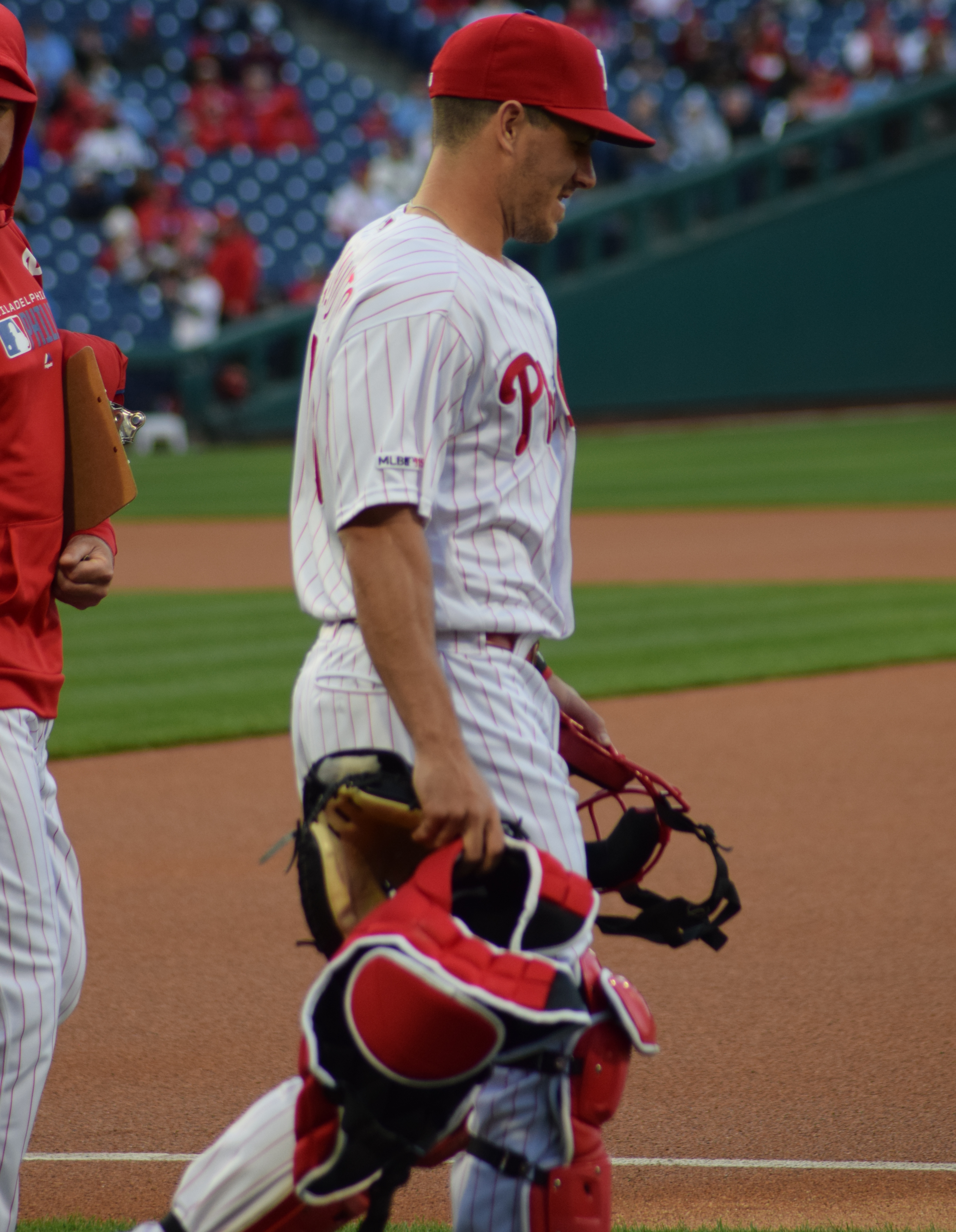
Realmuto with the Phillies in 2019

At the arbitration deadline on January 11, 2019, Realmuto agreed to a $5.9 million contract with the Marlins, including bonuses for each All-Star selection, Silver Slugger, and Gold Glove Award. However, in the fall of 2018, Realmuto and his agent had informed the Marlins that he would not sign a long-term contract with the team, and that he anticipated a trade. On February 7, 2019, the Marlins traded Realmuto to the Phillies in exchange for catcher Jorge Alfaro, pitching prospects Sixto Sánchez and Will Stewart, and $250,000 in international bonus slot money. Realmuto replaced Alfaro as the Phillies' starting catcher, with veteran Andrew Knapp serving in the backup role. Realmuto received his second All-Star Game selection that year, again the only member of his team selected. He was shut down during the last week of the season for a minor meniscus surgery after sustaining a knee injury during a game against the Cleveland Indians.

In 2019, Realmuto hit .275 with a career-high 25 home runs in a career-high 532 at bats.He also led all major league catchers with 83 RBIs, 90 runs, 144 hits, and 36 doubles. Defensively, he threw out 37 attempted base stealers, the most among major league catchers that season and the most of any Phillies catcher since Darren Daulton in 1993. Realmuto also logged the most innings of any catcher in 2019, starting 130 games and playing in 1139 1/3 innings. On November 3, Realmuto won his first career Gold Glove, joining Bob Boone and Mike Lieberthal as the third Phillies catcher to win the award. Four days later, he received his second Silver Slugger, becoming the first Phillies player to win the award since Chase Utley ten years prior. Realmuto was also named to the first-ever All-MLB First Team that December, the only Phillies player selected for either All-MLB team in 2019.

==== 2020 ====
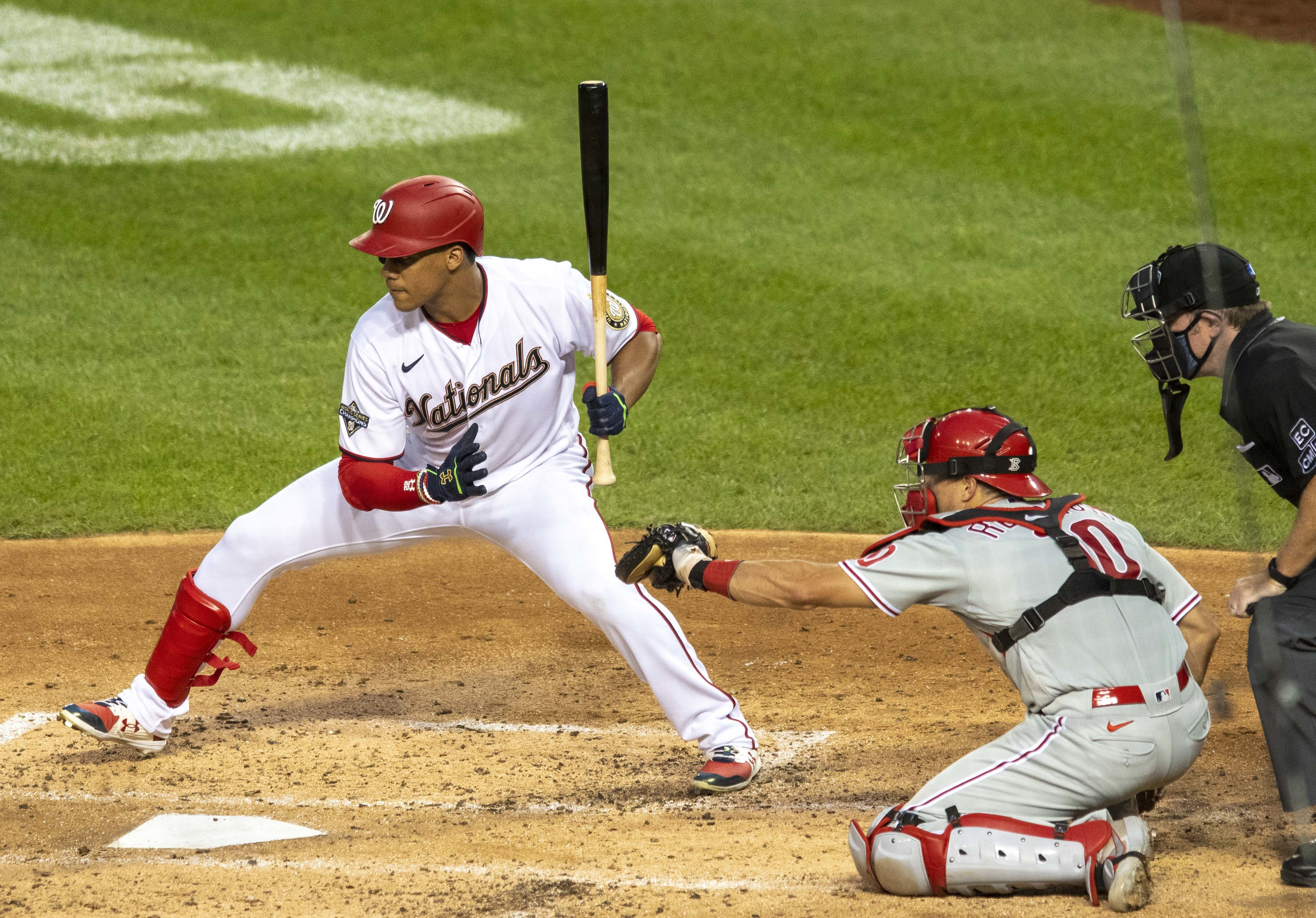
Realmuto (right) catching for the Phillies in 2020

When the COVID-19 pandemic shortened the 2020 MLB season to 60 games, Phillies management wanted to ensure that Realmuto remained healthy throughout the abbreviated season. Realmuto himself told reporters that he wanted to play in all 60 regular-season games that year and catch in at least 50. He was an early star in the Phillies' disappointing season; although the team posted a 5–9 record in their first 14 games, Realmuto collected eight home runs within the same span. It was the second time that an MLB catcher had collected eight home runs in the first 15 games of the season, following Gabby Hartnett's 1925 run with the Chicago Cubs. Realmuto remained healthy until September 12, when he exited a game against the Miami Marlins with hip discomfort. The timing of the injury left the Phillies without their primary catcher just before a stretch of 14 games in 11 days. He was diagnosed with a strained hip flexor, and he missed 10 games with the injury before returning on September 22 for a game against the Nationals. Realmuto batted .266 in 47 games that season, with 11 home runs, 32 RBIs, and 33 runs scored in 195 at-bats. Although no official All-Star teams were selected, Realmuto was named an "unofficial" All-Star starter for the 2020 season from an MLB.com article.

With the knowledge that Realmuto was on track to become a free agent at the end of the 2020 season, both Phillies fans and teammates began using the phrase "Sign J. T." to pressure managers into offering him a new contract. The push began in July 2020, during the Phillies' summer camp. After Realmuto hit a two-run home run during a scrimmage, outfielder Bryce Harper yelled "sign him" to the front office. Harper continued to push the Phillies to re-sign Realmuto throughout the season; after the final game of the season, he told reporters that, "Realmuto needs to be our catcher next year – plain and simple." Reliever Archie Bradley tweeted, "#SignJT" immediately after he himself signed with the Phillies. Although fans were not allowed inside Citizens Bank Park due to restrictions imposed by the COVID-19 pandemic, many would stand outside the ballpark gates to chant, "Sign J. T.". Realmuto officially became a free agent on November 11, 2020, when he declined the Phillies' one-year, $18.9 million qualifying offer. Three months later, on January 29, 2021, Realmuto agreed to a five-year, $115.5 million contract with the Phillies, the largest ever contract offered to a major league catcher.

==== 2021 ====
Realmuto fractured his thumb on February 18, 2021, the first day of spring training, when he attempted to block a curveball by new reliever José Alvarado. He did not return to spring training until a March 23 Grapefruit League game against the Toronto Blue Jays, in which he hit a home run during his first at bat. Realmuto suffered another injury that May, ultimately missing 11 games after a wild pitch from David Hale caused a bone bruise on his left hand. Realmuto hit his 100th major league home run on June 6, driving in three runs against Tanner Rainey in the sixth inning of a 12–6 victory over the Washington Nationals. Despite going through what Realmuto called "one of the worst slumps of [his] career", he was one of two Phillies, alongside Zack Wheeler, to be named to the 2021 All-Star Game. As there was no game in the 2020 season, this was Realmuto's third selection in a row. After San Francisco Giants catcher Buster Posey went on the disabled list shortly before the July 13 game, Realmuto was named the starting catcher for the National League team. In addition to catching, Realmuto hit a solo home run against Gregory Soto of the Detroit Tigers in the fifth inning of the game; it was the first home run by a Phillies player in an All-Star game since Mike Schmidt in 1981, and Realmuto's first hit in any of his All-Star appearances.

Realmuto finished the 2021 season hitting .263/.343/.439 with 17 home runs, 73 RBIs, and a career-high 48 walks, 129 strikeouts, and 13 stolen bases in 134 games, and he led the NL with 118 games at catcher. He had the fastest sprint speed of all major league catchers, at 28.8 feet/second.

==== 2022 ====
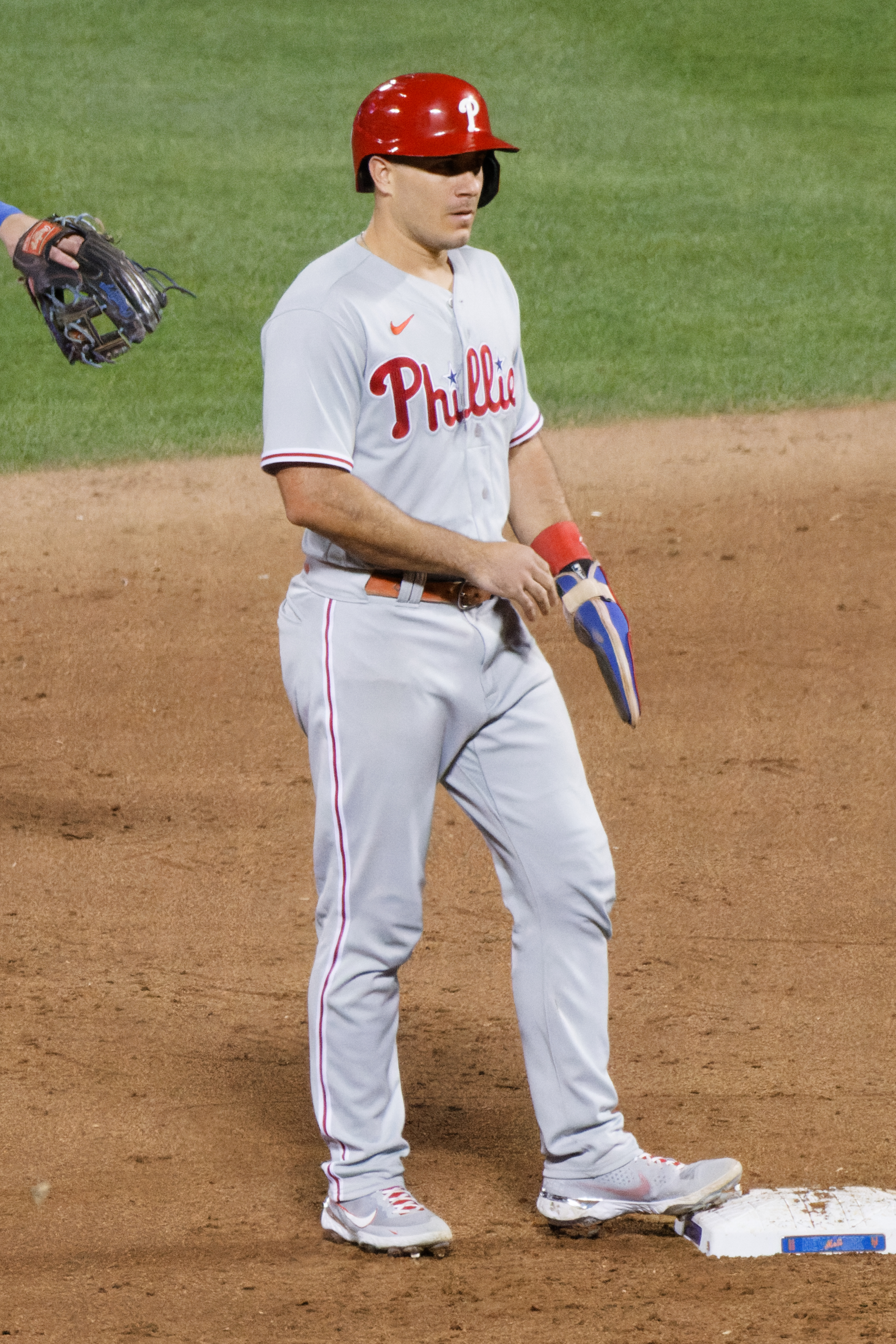
Realmuto with the Phillies in 2022

In 2022, Realmuto slashed .276/.342/.478 in 504 at bats with 75 runs, 22 home runs, and 84 RBIs, as well as 21 stolen bases on 22 attempts. In game 4 of the 2022 National League Division Series, against the Atlanta Braves, Realmuto became the first ever Phillies player, and first ever catcher, to hit an inside the park homerun in the postseason. In Game 1 of the 2022 World Series, against the Houston Astros, Realmuto hit a go-ahead game winning home run in the top of the 10th inning. Realmuto went on to win his third Silver Slugger and second Gold Glove award following the season. He also finished 7th in NL MVP voting, the first catcher to finish top ten in the NL since Buster Posey in 2015.

==== 2023 ====
On June 12, 2023, Realmuto hit for the cycle against the Arizona Diamondbacks, becoming the first Phillies player to accomplish the feat since David Bell in 2004. Realmuto played in 135 games for Philadelphia during the regular season, batting .252/.310/.452 with 20 home runs, 63 RBI, a career-high 138 strikeouts, and 16 stolen bases.

==== 2024 ====
On June 11, 2024, Phillies President of Baseball Operations Dave Dombrowski made the announcement that Realmuto would be scheduled to undergo right knee meniscectomy surgery the following day. He was placed on the 10-day injured list retroactive to June 10, with right knee pain. Realmuto made 99 appearances for Philadelphia during the year, slashing .266/.322/.429 with 14 home runs and 47 RBI.

==== 2025 ====
Realmuto made 134 appearances for the Phillies during the 2025 campaign, batting .257/.315/.384 with 12 home runs, 52 RBI, and eight stolen bases. He had a reverse split, with an OPS of .601 against lefties, and an OPS of .743 against righties.

==== 2026 ====
On January 20, 2026, Realmuto re-signed with the Phillies on a three-year, $45 million contract. In 2026 in 414 at bats, he batted .205/.283/.331 (all career lows) with 11 home runs, 51 RBIs, and three stolen bases, as on defense he threw out 24.4% of baserunners attempting to steal. He had a reverse split for the second season in a row, with an OPS of .562 against lefties, and an OPS of .631 against righties.

== Player profile ==
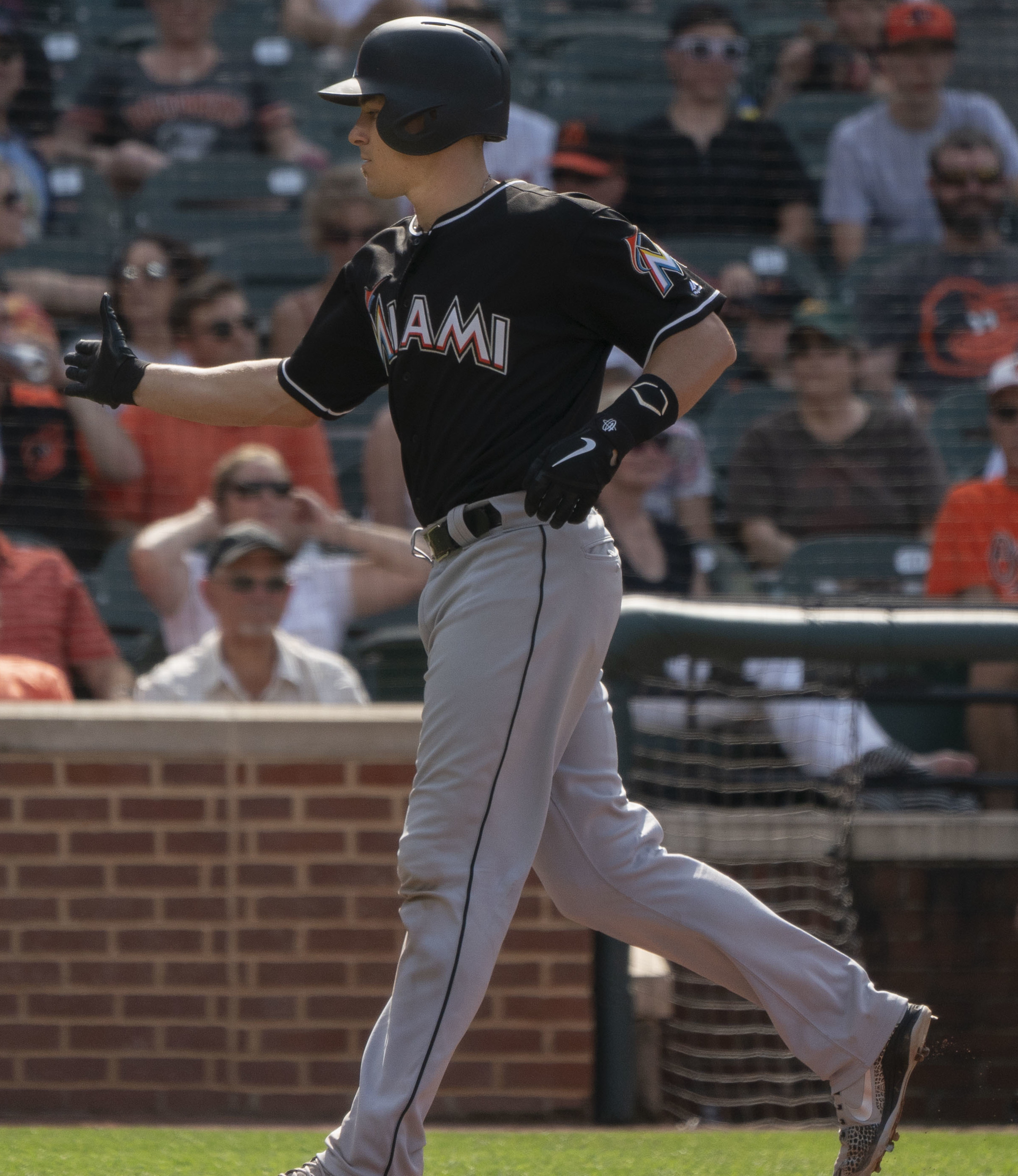
Realmuto with the Marlins in 2018

Realmuto has been referred to by sports journalists, baseball coaches and managers, and teammates as the "best catcher in baseball". The phrase began during the 2018 season, when FanGraphs and Baseball Prospectus both placed Realmuto at No. 1 among all MLB catchers in Wins Above Replacement. Phillies manager Joe Girardi referred to Realmuto as "the best catcher in baseball" during spring training in 2020, while St. Louis Cardinals catcher Yadier Molina told the Miami Herald in 2018 that, "As a catcher you observe other catchers in this league and you see the way he plays. J.T. has got it all." Phillies pitchers Zack Wheeler and Chase Anderson, meanwhile, both told The Philadelphia Inquirer that the opportunity to pitch to Realmuto was part of their decision to sign with the Phillies.

Defensively, Realmuto has stood out for his speed and accuracy. During the 2018 season, he had the fastest pop time in the league, taking an average time of 1.86 seconds to receive a ball from a pitcher and attempt to throw out a base runner. Although pop time has been criticized by some sabermetrics analysts for not considering accuracy of throws, Realmuto also led all major league catchers in caught stealing rate, picking off 44 percent of attempted base runners. That same year, he had the second-highest arm strength among all major league catchers, making throws at an average of 87.8 mph (141.3 km/h), second to former Phillies catcher Jorge Alfaro. In addition to making throws, Realmuto was a successful backstop for pitchers, blocking 90.5 percent of all potential wild pitches during the 2018 season.

Offensively, Realmuto has also been successful. During the 2018 season, his batting average was 57 points higher than the average among MLB catchers. Additionally, his slugging percentage was 63 points higher, while his on-base plus slugging was 30 points higher than average. While his strikeout and walk rates have not significantly changed throughout his baseball career, Realmuto has steadily improved at hitting the ball harder and higher, cutting his ground-ball rate from 49 to 43 percent between 2016 and 2018. He also has a faster sprint speed than the average MLB player. While the average sprint speed on an offensive play is 27 feet per second (8.2 m/s), and 25 feet per second (7.6 m/s) for catchers, Realmuto's has consistently hovered between 28.6 and 28.8 feet per second (8.7 and 8.8 m/s) since his first full MLB season.

As Realmuto has gotten older, Phillies management has started focusing on how to prolong his career. He turned 30 before the start of the 2021 MLB season, a point at which many major league catchers begin to experience a downturn in productivity and increased injury. During the offseason, Realmuto engages in a daily weight training regimen, meant to maintain his strength and health when he is not actively catching.

== Honors and awards ==
Award / Honor	Time(s)	Season(s)
MLB
NL All-Star	3	2018, 2019, 2021
NL Silver Slugger Award at catcher	3	2018, 2019, 2022
NL Gold Glove Award at catcher	2	2019, 2022
MLBPAA Marlins Heart & Hustle Award	2	2017, 2018
MLBPAA Phillies Heart & Hustle Award	1	2019
All-MLB First Team	2	2019, 2022
All-MLB Second Team	1	2020
Miami Marlins Most Valuable Player	1	2018
Miami Marlins Jeff Conine Award	1	2017
Miami Marlins Rookie of the Year	1	2015
NL Player of the Week Award	1	April 2–9, 2017
MiLB
Southern League Mid-Season All-Star	2	2013, 2014
Southern League Post-Season All-Star	1	2014
Marlins Minor League Player of the Year	1	2014
Baseball America Double-A All-Star	1	2014
Florida State League Mid-Season All-Star	1	2012
High school
ABCA National Player of the Year	1	2010
ABCA All-American	1	2010
Louisville Slugger All-American	1	2010

== Personal life ==
Realmuto is of Italian descent. He married his wife, Alexis Taylor, on November 4, 2017. The couple's first child, a daughter, was born on July 10, 2018, shortly before Realmuto's first All-Star appearance. Their second daughter was born on July 11, 2019. The Realmutos' first son was born in November 2021, with their second son being born in March 2023.

During the baseball season, the Realmutos reside in Haddonfield, New Jersey; in the offseason, they have a house in Oklahoma City. Realmuto and his wife are Christians.

Realmuto and his family are close friends with Bryce Harper, who was acquired by the Phillies around the same time as Realmuto. Harper began to admire Realmuto shortly after they were drafted, as the Marlins' rivals in the NL East were Harper's original team, the Washington Nationals. Realmuto is also friends with Milwaukee Brewers outfielder Christian Yelich, who was selected by the Marlins during the same draft as Realmuto.

In 2019, Realmuto and pitcher Aaron Nola were selected as the Phillies representatives for Garth Brooks' "Home Plate Project", an organization designed to fight childhood hunger. Both players were unable to travel with the Phillies to Canada to play against the Toronto Blue Jays because they were unvaccinated.

Realmuto is a member of the legendary Smith wrestling family from Oklahoma. His uncles include two-time Olympic gold medalist and four-time World champion John Smith, NCAA champion Lee Roy Smith, and four-time NCAA champion Pat Smith. His cousins are NCAA wrestling champions Matt and Chris Perry, and NCAA wrestling All-American Joe Smith.

== See also ==
- List of Major League Baseball annual putouts leaders
- List of Major League Baseball career double plays as a catcher leaders
- List of Major League Baseball career games played as a catcher leaders
- List of Major League Baseball career putouts as a catcher leaders
- List of Major League Baseball players to hit for the cycle
- List of Philadelphia Phillies award winners and league leaders
- Miami Marlins award winners and league leaders

Awards and achievements
Preceded by Cedric Mullins	Hitting for the cycle June 12, 2023	Succeeded by Elly de la Cruz
