= Matt Wilkinson (baseball) =

Canadian baseball player (born 2002)

San Francisco Giants – No. 71
- Pitcher
- Born: December 10, 2002 (age 23); Vancouver, British Columbia, Canada
- Bats: Right Throws: Left

MLB debut
- August 19, 2026, for the San Francisco Giants

MLB statistics (through 2026 season)
- Win–loss record: 1–3
- Earned run average: 3.58
- Strikeouts: 20
- Stats at Baseball Reference

Teams
- San Francisco Giants (2026–present)

Matthew James Wilkinson (born December 10, 2002) is a Canadian professional baseball pitcher for the San Francisco Giants of Major League Baseball (MLB). Nicknamed Tugboat, he made his MLB debut in 2026.

== Amateur career ==
Wilkinson pitched in the 2015 Little League World Series, striking out 16 batters in one game. He attended Foothills Composite High School in Okotoks, Alberta, Canada and played college baseball at Central Arizona College. In 2023, he was named the National Junior College Athletic Association (NJCAA) D1 Pitcher of the Year after recording a 1.07 earned run average (ERA) with 138 strikeouts in 84 innings. In 2023, he played collegiate summer baseball with the Chatham Anglers of the Cape Cod Baseball League.

== Professional career ==
=== Cleveland Guardians ===
The Cleveland Guardians selected Wilkinson in the 10th round, 308th overall, of the 2023 Major League Baseball draft. He signed with the Guardians, forgoing his transfer commitment to Arizona State University. Wilkinson made his professional debut with the Arizona Complex League Guardians. He began the 2024 season with the Single-A Lynchburg Hillcats. Wilkinson was promoted to the High-A Lake County Captains on May 21, 2024.

=== San Francisco Giants ===
On May 9, 2026, the Guardians traded Wilkinson and a compensatory draft pick in the 2026 MLB draft to the San Francisco Giants in exchange for Patrick Bailey. In ten starts for the Triple-A Sacramento River Cats, he posted a 5.15 ERA with 43 strikeouts. On August 19, Wilkinson was promoted to the major leagues for the first time. He made his debut later that day, tossing two scoreless innings. Four days later, Wilkinson allowed three runs on six hits over 3 2/3 innings against the Boston Red Sox, recording two strikeouts and no walks. During the outing, he recorded the first strikeout of his major-league career. On September 9, Wilkinson recorded his first career win, tossing two scoreless innings of relief against the St. Louis Cardinals.
