= Pop time =

Baseball statistic

Pop time, also known as POP, is a baseball statistic that measures the time it takes for a catcher to make a throw from home plate to second base during a stolen base attempt. The measure combines catcher's footwork (the time to get into throwing position), exchange time (the transfer from glove to throwing hand to release), and arm strength (velocity of throw).

The effectiveness of measuring pop time has been discussed. The primary criticism of the statistic is that it values speed over accuracy, as it does not account for whether the throw reached its destination. MLB.com's Mike Petriello said, "pop time does matter in preventing stolen bases, though it's also unsurprisingly a pretty noisy relationship".

The MLB average pop time is 2.01 seconds. A pop time of less than 2.0 seconds affords the pitcher 1.3 seconds to throw the ball to the catcher. Salvador Perez's 1.74 pop time during a 2017 throw was considered "stretch[ing] the boundaries of the position".

Austin Hedges led MLB in pop time in the 2017 season, with a 1.86 second average. In 2018, J. T. Realmuto led the league with a 1.90-second time.

Pop time leaders. (All stats are from 2015-2024.)

| Year | Player | Team | Pop Time |
| 2015 | Christian Bethancourt | Atlanta Braves | 1.89 |
| 2016 | Gary Sanchez | New York Yankees | 1.90 |
| 2017 | Austin Hedges | San Diego Padres | 1.90 |
| 2018 | J.T. Realmuto | Miami Marlins | 1.90 |
| 2019 | J.T. Realmuto | Philadelphia Phillies | 1.88 |
| 2020 | J.T. Realmuto | Philadelphia Phillies | 1.81 |
| 2021 | J.T. Realmuto | Philadelphia Phillies | 1.84 |
| 2022 | J.T. Realmuto | Philadelphia Phillies | 1.89 |
| 2023 | J.T. Realmuto | Philadelphia Phillies | 1.83 |
| 2024 | J.T. Realmuto | Philadelphia Phillies | 1.85 |
