= Jorge Alfaro =

Colombian baseball player (born 1993)

- Alfaro with the Omaha Storm Chasers in 2026

Free agent
- Catcher
- Born: June 11, 1993 (age 33); Sincelejo, Sucre, Colombia
- Bats: Right Throws: Right

MLB debut
- September 12, 2016, for the Philadelphia Phillies

MLB statistics (through 2025 season)
- Batting average: .253
- Home runs: 48
- Runs batted in: 201
- Stats at Baseball Reference

Teams
- Philadelphia Phillies (2016–2018); Miami Marlins (2019–2021); San Diego Padres (2022); Colorado Rockies (2023); Boston Red Sox (2023); Washington Nationals (2025)
Medals
Men's baseball
Representing Colombia
Bolivarian Games
Gold medal – first place	2017 Santa Marta	Team

Jorge Mario Alfaro Buelvas (born June 11, 1993) is a Colombian professional baseball catcher who is a free agent. He has previously played in Major League Baseball (MLB) for the Philadelphia Phillies, Miami Marlins, San Diego Padres, Colorado Rockies, Boston Red Sox, and Washington Nationals. Alfaro signed with the Texas Rangers as a free agent in 2010, was traded to the Phillies in 2015, and made his MLB debut in 2016. He plays on the Colombia national baseball team in international competition.

== Early and personal life ==
Alfaro was born in Sincelejo, Sucre, Colombia. His younger brother Jhoandro is a catcher who played in the Chicago White Sox organization. Alfaro played baseball and soccer at Instituto Técnico Industrial Antonio Prieto, graduating in 2009.

== Professional career ==
=== Texas Rangers ===
Alfaro signed with the Texas Rangers in June 2010 as a 16-year-old free agent for a $1.3 million signing bonus that was a record at the time for any Colombian prospect. In 2010, playing for the DSL Rangers in the Dominican Summer League he batted .221/.278/.291 with one home run and 23 runs batted in (RBIs).

In 2011, playing for the Low–A Spokane Indians in the Northwest League, Alfaro batted .300/.345/.481 (9th in the league) with six home runs, 23 RBIs, and seven hit by pitch (6th) in 160 at bats, as on defense he allowed 12 passed balls and made 10 errors in 36 games at catcher. He was a Baseball America Short-Season All Star and a Topps Short-Season/Rookie All Star, and Baseball America named him the 8th-best prospect in the Northwest League. In 2012, playing for the Single–A Hickory Crawdads in the South Atlantic League, he batted .261/.320/.430 with five home runs and 34 RBIs in 272 at bats. Baseball America rated Alfaro the 9th-best Rangers prospect.

Prior to the 2013 season Alfaro was ranked by MLB.com as the 88th-best prospect in baseball. Alfaro was ranked the 54th-best prospect by Baseball America. In 2013, playing for Hickory in the South Atlantic League, he was a mid-season All Star, an MiLB.com Texas Organization All Star, and an All-Star Futures Game selection. He batted .258/.338/.452 with 16 home runs, 53 RBIs, and 18 hit by pitch (leading the league) in 372 at bats, as on defense he allowed 26 passed balls and made 10 errors in 82 games at catcher. Baseball America named him the 14th-best prospect in the South Atlantic League. He also had 21 at bats with the AZL Rangers, and 11 at bats with the Myrtle Beach Pelicans. After the 2013 season he played for the Surprise Saguaros in the Arizona Fall League, where he was batted .386 (3rd in the league)/.438 (9th)/.500 with 18 runs (5th), six doubles (6th), 11 RBIs, and three hit by pitch (2nd) in 70 at bats. He was named both a Rising Star and to the All-Prospect Team.

In 2014 playing for the High–A Myrtle Beach Pelicans he was Carolina League Player of the Week on August 4, a mid-season All Star, an MiLB Texas Organization All Star, and a post-season All Star. Alfaro was also the starting catcher for the World Squad at the All-Star Futures Game. For the season, he batted .261/.318/.440 with five triples (10th in the league), 13 home runs (6th), 73 RBIs (3rd), and 12 hit by pitch (4th), as on defense he allowed 18 passed balls and made 13 errors at catcher in 75 games. Baseball America named him the second-best prospect in the Carolina League. He also had 88 at bats with the Double-A Frisco RoughRiders of the Texas League, batting .261/.343/.443 with four home runs and 14 RBIs.

On November 20, 2014, the Rangers added Alfaro to their 40-man roster to protect him from being selected in the Rule 5 draft. In 2015 playing for Frisco he was a mid-season All Star, and batted .253/.314/.432 with five home runs and 21 RBIs in 190 at bats.

=== Philadelphia Phillies ===
On July 31, 2015, the Rangers traded Alfaro, Nick Williams, Matt Harrison, Jake Thompson, Alec Asher, and Jerad Eickhoff to the Philadelphia Phillies in exchange for Cole Hamels and Jake Diekman. In the remainder of 2015 he had four at bats with the GCL Phillies. Baseball America named him the 5th-best prospect in the Phillies minor league system.

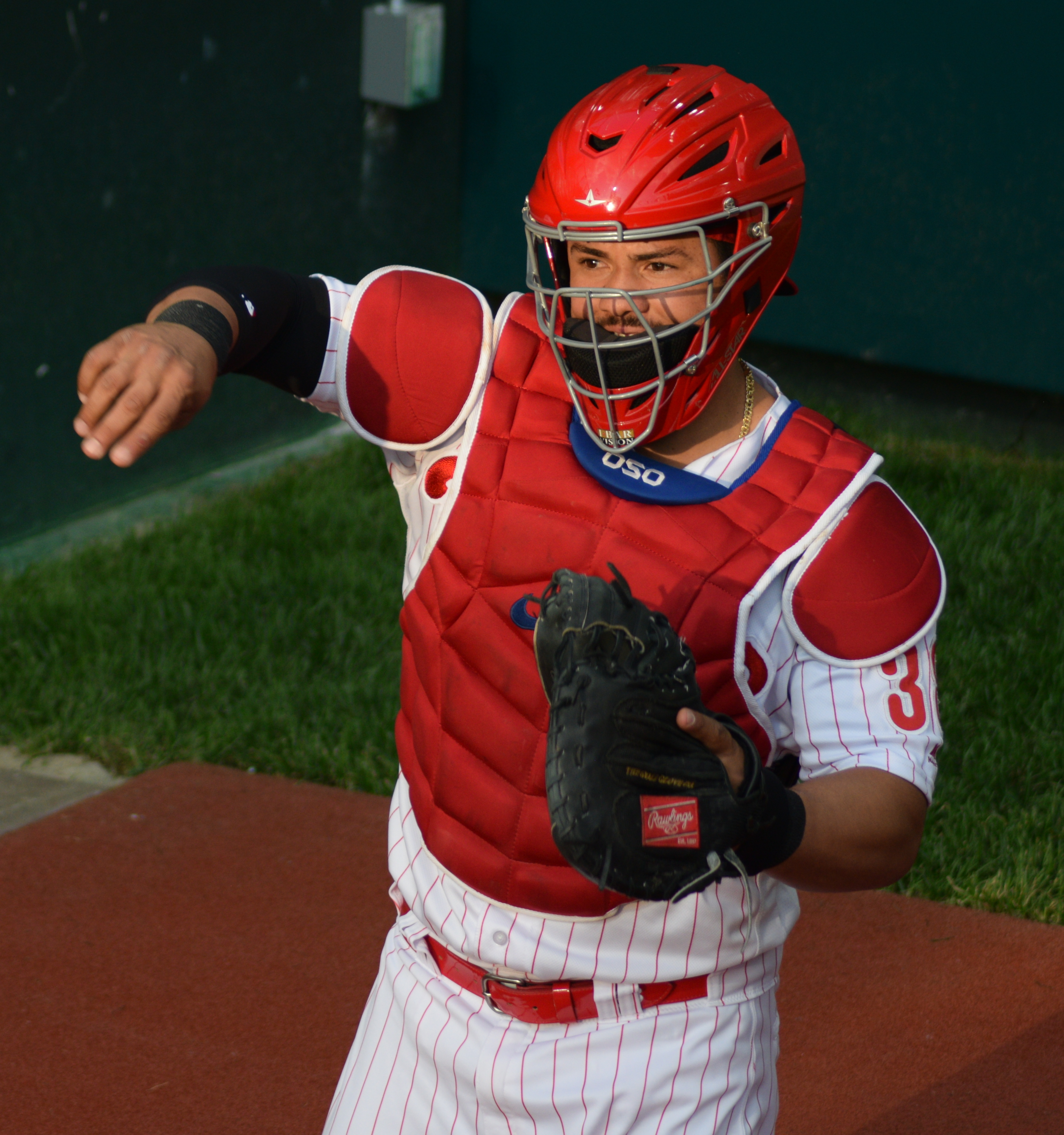
Alfaro with the Phillies in 2018

In 2016 playing for the Double-A Reading Fightin Phils he was an Eastern League Player of the Week and Phillies Minor League Player of the Week on April 17, Phillies Minor League Defender of the Month for July, a mid-season All Star, and an MiLB Philadelphia Organization All Star. The Phillies promoted Alfaro to the major leagues on August 26. Alfaro was optioned back to Reading the next day. He was recalled on September 11 after the Reading season ended; he had batted .285/.325/.458 in Reading with 15 home runs (6th in the league), 67 RBIs (9th) and 105 strikeouts (tied for 5th) in 404 at bats. He had a total of 16 major league at bats in 2016, in which he had two hits and eight strikeouts.

Alfaro entered 2017 ranked by MLB Pipeline as the No. 72 prospect, and the Phillies' No. 3 prospect. In 2017 he batted .318/.360/.514 with five home runs and 14 RBIs in 107 major league at bats. Alfaro also had the second-fastest baserunning sprint speed of all major league catchers, at 28.1 feet/second. He had the highest batting average on balls in play of all major league hitters with 100 or more at bats, at .420, swung at the highest percentage of balls outside the strike zone of all NL batters, at 46.2%, and swung and missed at an MLB-leading 21.7% of the pitches he saw. With the Triple–A Lehigh Valley IronPigs of the International League, Alfaro was a mid-season All Star, and for the season he batted .241/.291/.358 with seven home runs and 43 RBIs in 324 at bats.

In 2018 with the Phillies, Alfaro batted .262/.324/.407 with 10 home runs, 37 RBIs, and 14 hit by pitch (8th in the National League) in 344 major league at bats. He had the highest batting average on balls in play of all major league hitters with 300 or more at bats, at .406. He also had the second-fastest baserunning sprint speed of all major league catchers, at 28.3 feet/second. On the other hand, he struck out 36.6% of the time, the highest rate in the National League and third-highest among all players in MLB with 300 or more plate appearances. He swung and missed at an MLB-leading 23.8% of the pitches he saw (the next-highest rate was Avisail Garcia's 19.0%), and swung at the highest percentage of balls outside the strike zone of all NL batters, at 46.9% (while having the lowest contact percentage with pitches outside the strike zone of all NL batters, at 42.9%).

On defense, in 2018 he had the best arm strength (90.8) and the third-best average pop time to second base (1.94 seconds) of all major league catchers, while he ranked fourth among all catchers in pitch framing according to Baseball Prospectus. He led the NL in catcher's ERA (3.45), and his 9.11 range factor per game ranked 2nd among National League catchers. However, Alfaro also led all NL catchers in passed balls (10) and stolen bases allowed (59; though he tied for 3rd in runners caught stealing (21)), and tied for first in errors (11). Baseball America named him to its 2018 MLB All-Rookie Team.

=== Miami Marlins ===
On February 7, 2019, Alfaro was traded with Sixto Sánchez, Will Stewart, and $250,000 in international bonus slot money to the Miami Marlins in exchange for J. T. Realmuto.

In 2019, he batted .262/.312/.425 with a career-high 154 strikeouts in 431 at bats, and was 2nd in the NL with 11 passed balls, and 3rd with 11 errors. He swung at and missed an NL-leading 26.1% of the pitches he saw, and swung at the highest percentage of balls outside the strike zone of all NL batters, at 50.4% (while having the fifth-lowest contact percentage with pitches outside the strike zone of all NL batters, at 52.8%), and had the highest swinging strike percentage of all NL batters, at 22.1%. He had the fastest sprint speed of all major league catchers, at 28.8 feet/second.

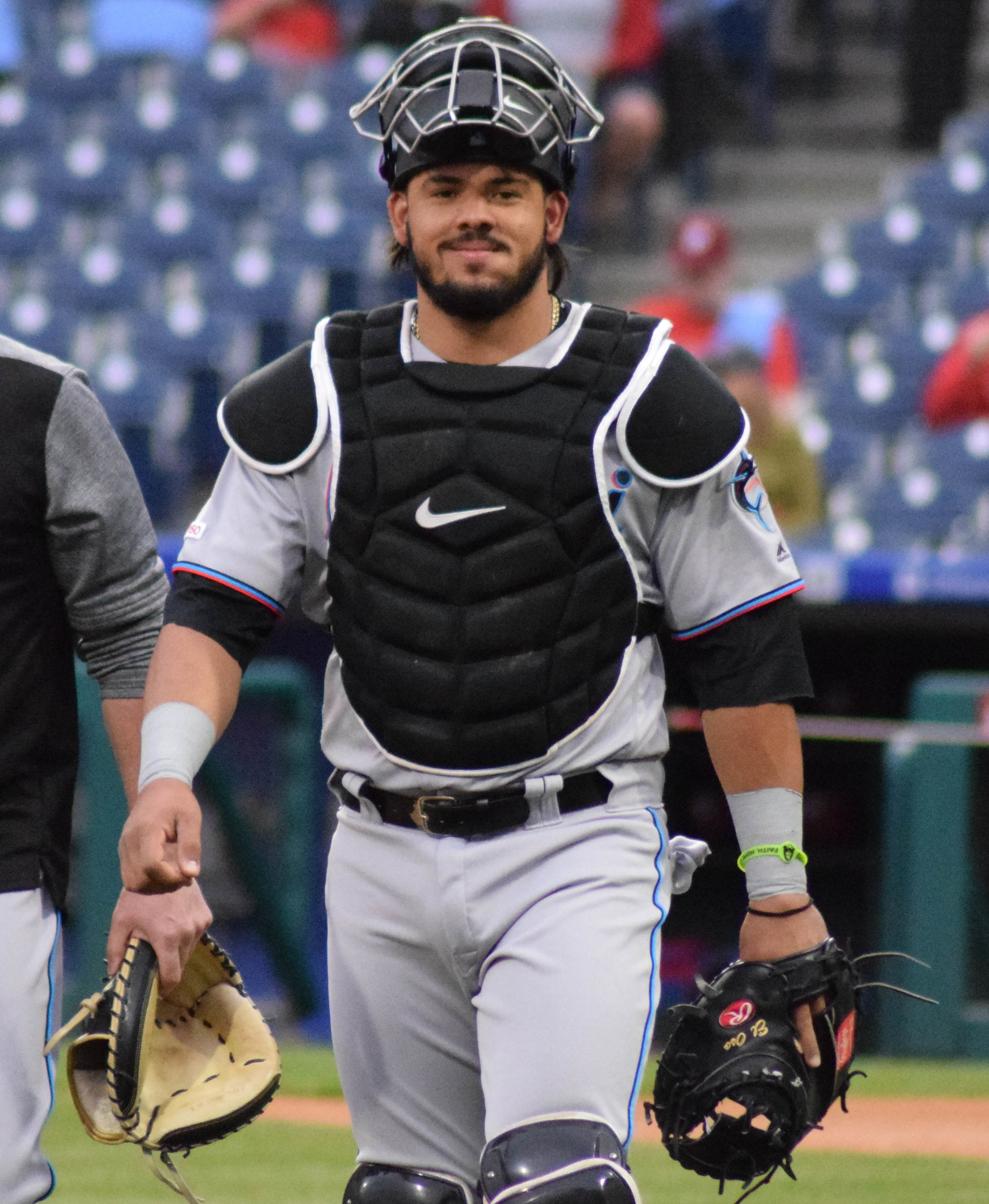
Alfaro with the Marlins

In 2020 he batted .226/.280/.344, and at catcher was 2nd in the NL with 4 passed balls. He had the lowest framing percentage of all major league catchers.

In 2021, he batted .244/.283/.342 in 92 games. At catcher, he led the National League with 13 passed balls, despite only playing 61 games at the position. He swung at and missed an NL-second-highest 40.8% of the pitches he saw, swung at the highest percentage of balls outside the strike zone of all NL batters, at 49.1% (while having the fourth-lowest contact percentage with pitches outside the strike zone of all NL batters, at 42.1%), and had the highest swinging strike percentage of all NL batters, at 24.6%. After July he was moved to left field, where he played for the majority of August and September. From 2016 to 2021, Alfaro swung at a higher percentage of pitches than any other player in MLB, and had the third-worst contact rate when swinging at pitches, of all MLB batters with a minimum of 500 plate appearances.

=== San Diego Padres ===
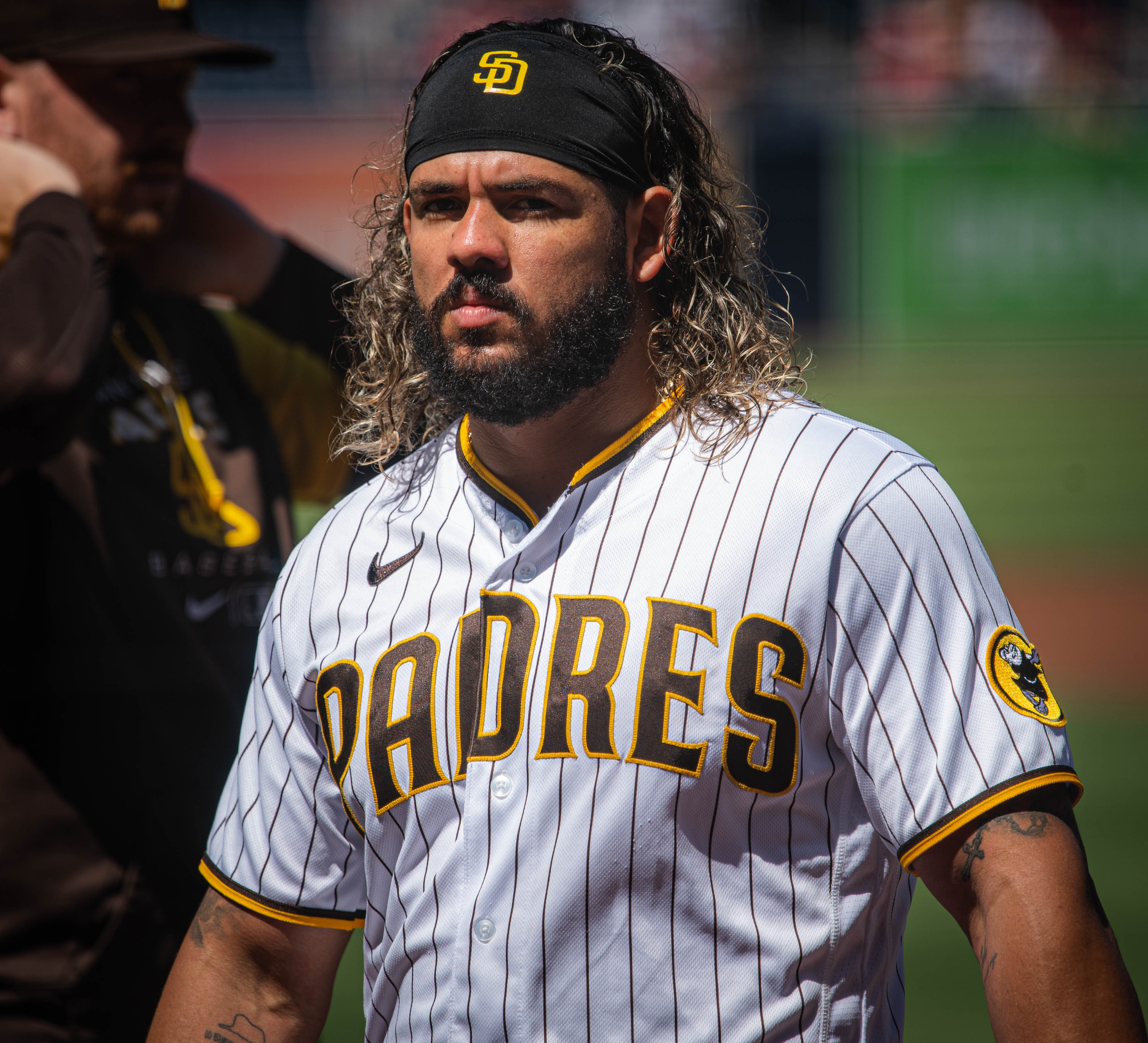
Alfaro with the San Diego Padres in 2022

On November 30, 2021, the Marlins traded Alfaro to the San Diego Padres in exchange for cash or a player to be named later, which turned out to be cash considerations. In 2022, he played in 82 games for San Diego, hitting .246/.285/.383 with 7 home runs and 40 RBI. Additionally, Alfaro had four walk-off hits during the season. He swung at the highest percentage of balls outside the strike zone of all NL batters, at 49.2%, and has the highest swinging strike percentage of all NL batters, at 21.7%. On defense, he again led the NL in passed balls, this time with 7, in 65 games. On November 18, 2022, Alfaro was non-tendered by the Padres and became a free agent.

=== Boston Red Sox ===
On January 26, 2023, Alfaro signed a minor-league contract with the Boston Red Sox and was named a non-roster invitee to spring training. Alfaro played in 43 games for the Triple-A Worcester Red Sox, hitting .320/.367/.520 with 6 home runs, 30 RBI, and 4 stolen bases. On June 1, Alfaro exercised the opt-out clause in his contract, giving the Red Sox 48 hours to add him to their 40-man roster or grant him his release. The Red Sox declined to add Alfaro to their roster, and he was formally released on June 3.

=== Colorado Rockies ===
On June 10, 2023, Alfaro signed a minor league contract with the Colorado Rockies organization. After three games with the Triple–A Albuquerque Isotopes, Alfaro was selected to the major league roster on June 15. In 10 games for Colorado (two at catcher), Alfaro hit just .161/.188/.387 with 1 home run and 4 RBI. On June 30, Alfaro was designated for assignment following the promotion of Ty Blach. He cleared waivers and was sent outright to Triple–A Albuquerque on July 4.

=== Boston Red Sox (second stint) ===
On July 6, 2023, after many injuries at the catching position, the Boston Red Sox brought back Alfaro on a major-league contract. In 8 games for Boston, he went 2–for–17 (.118) with 2 walks. Alfaro was designated for assignment by the team on August 1. He elected to become a free agent on August 5.

=== Miami Marlins (second stint) ===
On August 15, 2023, Alfaro signed a minor league contract to return to the Miami Marlins organization. In 18 games for the Triple–A Jacksonville Jumbo Shrimp, he batted .200/.274/.262 with no home runs and six RBI. Alfaro elected free agency following the season on November 6.

=== Chicago Cubs ===
On December 13, 2023, Alfaro signed a minor league contract with the Chicago Cubs On March 25, 2024, Alfaro was released by the Cubs.

=== Milwaukee Brewers ===
On January 14, 2025, Alfaro signed a minor league contract with the Milwaukee Brewers. He spent his entire time in the Brewers organization with the Triple-A Nashville Sounds in the International League, where he batted .244 with 15 home runs, 49 RBI, 119 strikeouts (10th in the league) and a .715 OPS in 307 at-bats across 82 appearances. The Brewers released Alfaro on September 1, after he triggered the opt-out clause in his contract.

=== Washington Nationals ===
On September 2, 2025, Alfaro signed a major league contract with the Washington Nationals. He played his first game with the Nationals the following day, and in his first major league at-bat since July 2023, hit the first pitch he was thrown for an RBI double. In 14 appearances for Washington, Alfaro batted .256/.256/.308 with three RBI and one stolen base. On October 31, Alfaro was removed from the 40-man roster and sent outright to the minor leagues; he subsequently rejected the assignment and elected free agency.

=== Kansas City Royals ===
On January 5, 2026, Alfaro signed a minor league contract with the Kansas City Royals. In 62 games between Double-A and Triple-A he batted .223/.287/.468 with 15 home runs, 51 RBIs and one stolen base. He was released on October 23.

== International career ==
Alfaro played for the Colombia national baseball team in the 2017 World Baseball Classic. He also played for Colombia at the 2023 World Baseball Classic.

Alfaro was named to the Colombian roster for the 2026 World Baseball Classic qualifiers, held in March 2025 in Tucson, Arizona.
