= 2020 New York Yankees season =

Season for the Major League Baseball team the New York Yankees

2020 New York Yankees
- American League Wild Card winners
- League: American League
- Division: East
- Ballpark: Yankee Stadium
- City: New York
- Record: 33–27 (.550)
- Divisional place: 2nd
- Owners: Yankee Global Enterprises
- General managers: Brian Cashman
- Managers: Aaron Boone
- Television: YES Network (Michael Kay, Ken Singleton, Ryan Ruocco, several others as analysts)
- Radio: WFAN SportsRadio 66 AM / 101.9 FM; New York Yankees Radio Network (John Sterling, Suzyn Waldman); WADO 1280 AM TUDN Radio; Cadena Radio Yankees (Francisco Rivera, Rickie Ricardo)

The 2020 New York Yankees season was the 118th season for the New York Yankees. The Yankees played in Yankee Stadium in The Bronx and were managed by Aaron Boone in his third season as manager.

The ongoing COVID-19 pandemic resulted in a delayed and shortened season. On March 12, MLB announced the cancellation of the remainder of spring training and the postponement of the start of the regular season by at least two weeks. Four days later, following the CDC's recommendation against large public events, MLB announced an indefinite postponement. Finally, on June 23, commissioner Rob Manfred unilaterally implemented a 60-game regular season. Players reported to training camps on July 1 to resume spring training and prepare for a July 23 Opening Day.

The Yankees began the shortened season with a hot 16–6 start, then lost 15 of their next 20 games, bringing their win-loss record to 21–21. They rebounded to finish 33–27, second place in the American League East and seven games behind the Tampa Bay Rays, but still good enough to qualify for the American League's fifth seed in the expanded postseason. The Yankees swept the Cleveland Indians in the best-of-three Wild Card Series, advancing to the American League Division Series against the Tampa Bay Rays, which they lost in 5 games.

== Offseason ==
=== Transactions ===
==== 2019 ====
- December 11 – Gerrit Cole signs a nine-year, $324 million contract with the Yankees, the richest contract ever given to an MLB pitcher.
- December 12 – Brett Gardner re-signs with the Yankees after reaching a one-year, $12.5 million deal. The deal breaks down with a $2 million signing bonus and an $8 million salary for this season. The Yankees have a $10 million option for 2021 with a $2.5 million buyout.

== Regular season ==
=== Transactions ===
==== 2020 ====
- August 21 – acquired right-handed reliever Addison Russ from the Philadelphia Phillies, trading veteran right-handed pitcher David Hale.
- August 26 – acquired catcher Rob Brantly from the San Francisco Giants for cash considerations.

On September 17, the Yankees became the first team in MLB history to hit six plus home runs in each of their previous three games. While facing the Toronto Blue Jays in the last game of a three-game series, they hit five home runs in one inning (the fourth), tying an MLB record. This marks just the fourth time in MLB history that a team has hit six or more home runs in three consecutive games, hitting 19 total.

Highlights of the regular season included DJ LeMahieu finishing the season with a major league-leading .364 average. Luke Voit also topped the majors with 22 home runs. They are the first pair of teammates to lead MLB in batting average and home runs since Hank Aaron (.355) and Eddie Mathews (46 HR) for the 1959 Milwaukee Braves. LeMahieu is the 4th Yankee to lead the majors in hitting and the 9th Yankee to win an AL batting title. LeMahieu is also the second player ever to win a batting title in each league.

==== July ====
July 23 - July 26 vs. Washington Nationals

The 2020 New York Yankees season began on July 23 against the defending champion Washington Nationals. Yankees ace Gerrit Cole made his debut for his new team after his offseason signing where he departed from the Houston Astros. Cole recorded his first ever win in the Yankees pinstripes, going 5 innings alongside 5 strikeouts. The game was cut short due to weather, however the Yankees started the season with a 4–1 win. Yankees all-star slugger Giancarlo Stanton started the season hot with three RBIs as well as a two-run home run in the first inning off opposing ace Matt Scherzer. Game two of the series went to the Nationals, as the Yankee bats never came to life. The Yankees lost 9–2, however Giancarlo Stanton remained hot, hitting his second home run of the season. Ultimately, the Yankees won the series taking game three by a score of 3–2. Yankees pitcher Jonathan Loáisiga recorded his first start of the season, however long time reliever Chad Green was rewarded the win thanks to two late game home runs from Luke Voit and Gleyber Torres.

July 27 - July 29 vs. Philadelphia Phillies

Following the series win against the Nationals, the Yankees were slated to head north to take on the Philadelphia Phillies. Ultimately these games were postponed after a number of players from the Phillies tested positive for COVID-19. The Phillies had just come off a three-game series against the Miami Marlins, in which 18 Marlins players and staff tested positive for COVID-19. Following new MLB COVID guidelines lead to the postponement of this series.

July 29–30 vs. Baltimore Orioles

In wake of the Philadelphia postponement, the Yankees traveled to downtown Baltimore to take on the Baltimore Orioles at the iconic Camden Yards. The Yankees extended their hot streak, winning both games by a score of 9-3 and 8-6 respectively. The Yankee bats were beginning to heat up in late July featuring five Yankee home runs in the two game span. Yankees ace Gerrit Cole recorded his second win of the season while Jonathan Loáisiga notched his first win as well.

July 31 - August 2 vs. Boston Red Sox

The final series in July featured the Yankees paired against the division rival Boston Red Sox. However, the series proved to be less of an even match than expected, as the Yankees took down all three games in a clean sweep. In game one, the Yankees put up 5 runs from a combined three home runs from Aaron Judge, Gio Urshela and Brett Gardner. The Yankees won this game 5–1. Game two had a very similar result as the Yankees won 5-2 off of an Aaron Judge solo HR and a Gio Urshela grand slam. The last game of the series was a much closer game, with the Yankees edging out the Red Sox 9–7. Aaron Judge continued to show off his fire power, hitting two home runs and extending his home run streak to five games. The Yankees win marked six wins in a row and put their record at 7-1 through the end of July.

==== August ====
August 3 - August 6 vs. Philadelphia Phillies

The Yankees began their first series in August playing the Philadelphia Phillies who were returning from a weeklong layoff due to MLB COVID-19 protocols. The Yankees were slated to play the Phillies earlier this season, so this four-game-series was a make up from the missed series before. The Yankees made easy work of the Phillies in game one, winning 6–3. Gerrit Cole notched his third win in his third start giving up 1 earned run in six innings pitched. The next two games were a doubleheader, and due to the COVID shortened season, all doubleheaders were 7-inning-games. The Yankees split the doubleheader, losing the first game 11-7 while winning the second game 3–1. The Yankees would lose the last game of the series by a score of 5–4, putting the series record at 2-2 and the Yankees overall record at 9–3. The Yankees 9–3 record was the second best in the American League, trailing the Minnesota Twins by one game.

August 7 - August 9 vs. Tampa Bay Rays

Following the split series with the Phillies, the Yankees headed down to Florida to take on the Tampa Bay Rays. Game one of the series resulted in a Yankees defeat with a final score of 1–0, the sole run from this game coming from a Michael Pérez sacrifice fly in the eight inning. The next two games were played as a doubleheader in which the Yankees took the first game 8-4 and lost the second game 5–3. Both games were 7 innings as mandated by MLB's COVID-19 protocol for doubleheaders. Gerrit Cole started the first game of the doubleheader but ultimately received a no-decision which snapped a 20-game win streak dating back to the previous season. Instead, Yankees reliever Chad Green notched his second win of the season. The Yankees lost the final game of the season 4-3 due to a Michael Perez walk off single in the bottom of the 9th. The Yankees lost the series to Tampa Bay 1–3, recording their first series loss of the season and bumping their record down to 10–6 on the season.

August 11- August 12 vs Atlanta Braves

After a day of rest on August 10, the Yankees were back home to take on the 11-7 Atlanta Braves. The Yankees played a quick two-game-series against the Braves, winning both games. The first game was a high scoring affair in which the Yankees won 9-6 powered by a 3-RBI game from both Luke Voit and Mike Ford. Aaron Judge added a home run as well, but ended up leaving the game due to injury. It was also announced that Yankees outfielder Giancarlo Stanton is expected to miss 3–4 weeks due to a hamstring injury. Yankees starting pitcher Jordan Montgomery record the win and improved his record to 2–1 on the season. The following game the Yankees won 6-3 powered by a DJ LeMahieu four-hit game as well as a three-hit game from Yankees outfielder Clint Frazier in his season debut. Jonathan Loáisiga got the win in the reliever position and improved to 2–0 on the season.

August 14 - August 17 vs. Boston Red Sox

Following the series sweep of the Braves, the Boston Red Sox returned to Yankee Stadium for a four-game series. The Yankees had swept the Red Sox in their previous encounter this season, and this series was no different. The Yankees won four straight against the Red Sox and were now riding a six-game win streak through the middle stages of August. Gerrit Cole pitched a gem in game one of the series, going seven innings while allowing one earned run. Gleyber Torres went 4-4 and Mike Tauchman punched in four RBIs to lead the Yankees to a 10–3 win. The Yankees won game two 11-5 thanks to a five-RBI performance from Clint Frazier. James Paxton recorded his first win of the season. However, red-hot hitter DJ LeMahieu left the game with an apparent thumb injury. Mike Ford drove in 3 runs in game three and J. A. Happ cataloged his first win of the season as the Yankees won 4–2. To complete the sweep, the Yankees won the final game of the series 6–3; Yankees first basemen Luke Voit hit two home runs alongside three RBIs. Despite the team's injuries, the Yankees were now 16-6 - the best record in MLB.

August 18 - August 20 vs. Tampa Bay Rays

The Yankees continued their homestretch against the Tampa Bay Rays, who trailed the AL East best Yankees by 2.5 games. The three-game series resulted in three Yankees losses. The Yankees lost the series opener 6–3, despite home runs from both Luke Voit and Gary Sánchez putting an end to the Yankees six-game winning streak. Yankees starting pitcher Masahiro Tanaka recorded his first loss of the season, moving him to 0–1 on the season. Gerrit Cole pitched game two of the series, recording his second no decision of the year. Cole allowed two home runs to Tampa Bay Rays players, and the Yankees went on to lose the game 2–4. The Yankees lost the final game of the series 10–5, allowing the Rays to pass the Yankees for the lead in the division. Luke Voit remained very hot, hitting his 10th home run of the season, tying him for the AL lead in home runs hit with Mike Trout. In their seven games played against the Tampa Bay Rays, the Yankees are 1–6.

August 21 - August 23 vs. New York Mets

The much anticipated Subway Series between the New York Yankees and the New York Mets was inevitably postponed due to multiple positive COVID-19 tests within the Mets organization. Out of precaution, the three-game series was delayed and to be played later in the season.

August 26 vs. Atlanta Braves

After a long five day rest for the Yankees, the season resumed in Atlanta where they took on the Atlanta Braves for the second time this season. The two-game-series was played in one day, both games being 7 innings as it was a doubleheader. The Yankees lost the first game 5–1 as Gerrit Cole recorded his first loss of the season, as well as his first losing performance in 28 straight starts dating back to last season. Cole allowed 3 home runs in five innings. Luke Voit hit was responsible for the only run of the game, hitting his 11th home run of the season. The Yankees suffered a similar result in the second game, losing 2–1, earning reliever Chad Green his first loss of the season. This marked back-to-back series sweeps against the Yankees and dropped them to a 16–11 record on the season.

August 28 - August 30 vs. New York Mets

After a week of postponement, the New York Yankees and the New York Mets clashed in the Subway Series. This was the Yankees first five-game series of the season, and due to the restrictions of the shortened the season, this series was played in just three days, featuring two doubleheaders. The Yankees lost both games in the first doubleheader by scores of 6-4 and 4-3 respectively. The second leg of the doubleheader featured a Mets walk-off against the Yankees, resulting in both a loss and a blown save for the Yankees veteran closer Aroldis Chapman. The two consecutive losses to start the series gave the Yankees their longest losing streak of the season at seven games. However, the following game the Yankees bounced back to win 2–1, a game in which Yankees closer Aroldis Chapman was able to rebound and record his first win of the season. Infielder DJ LeMahieu made his return from injury as well. The closing doubleheader featured two Yankees wins. Gio Urshela issued the walk-off drive in the first game, while catcher Gary Sánchez rifled a go-ahead grand slam in the second game. The Yankees won the series 3–2 after dropping the first two.

August 31 - September 2 vs. Tampa Bay Rays

To close out the month of August, the Yankees hosted the sizzling hot Tampa Bay Rays, who had won 19 of their last 22 games. The Rays took game one of the three-game series by a score of 5-3 and handed Gerrit Cole his second straight loss, putting him at 4–2 on the season. Luke Voit provided a bright spot in this game, hitting his 13th home run and tying him for the major league lead. The Yankees were able to stunt the Rays' hot streak in game two of the series, winning 5–3. DJ LeMahieu roped two home runs and Yankees pitcher Masahiro Tanaka notched his first win of the season. Closer Aroldis Chapman threw a 101 mph fastball at Rays hitter Michael Brosseau at the end of this game as well, inciting both teams' benches to clear. Following the scuffle of game 2, the Yankees lost the final game of the series, 5–2, as Rays hitter Michael Brosseau got his revenge, hitting two home runs off Yankees pitchers. The Yankees lost this series 2–1, now losing all three of their series' against the division rival Tampa Bay Rays.

==== September ====
September 3 vs. New York Mets

Now more than halfway through the season, the Yankees crossed New York City to take on the New York Mets in their final exchange of the season. It was a quick one-game series in which the Mets had a late-game comeback and ultimately won in extra innings. Mets slugger Pete Alonso hit a home run in the bottom of the 10th inning, which handed the Yankees a 9–7 loss. The Yankees and the Mets played a total of six games against each other, with this Mets win tying the season series at 3–3.

September 4 - September 6 vs. Baltimore Orioles

After their one-game spat against the Mets, the Yankees took on the Baltimore Orioles for the second time this season. Going into the series, the Yankees and the Orioles had opposite records, with the Yankees standing at 20–16, and the Orioles at 16–20. The first two games of the four-game series were a doubleheader, with the Yankees winning the first 6–5 and dropping the second 6–3. Both Miguel Andújar and Clint Frazier had clutch hits in the final inning of the first game to secure the win. The Orioles curbed the Yankees offense in game two, holding the team to a combined four hits. Game three was another loss for the Yankees and the third consecutive loss for Gerrit Cole despite his ten strikeouts and one earned run. The Yankees lost this game 6-1 and would lose the next one 5-1 due to their lackluster offense.

September 7 - September 9 vs. Toronto Blue Jays

40 games into the abridged 60-game season, the Yankees were met by the surging Toronto Blue Jays. The Blue Jays held a one-game advantage over the Yankees in the AL East, and were making a playoff run through the dog days of the season. Despite the Yankees' bats coming back to life, the Yankees lost game one of the series 12–7 in a defenseless game. Yankees reliever Adam Ottavino had a disastrous outing, allowing six earned runs without recording an out. Game 2 in the series featured a lot less offense from both teams, however the Yankees dropped this one as well by a score of 2-1 and extending their five-game losing streak. The Yankees won the final game of the series 7–2, showing both their hitting and pitching come to life. Shortstop Gleyber Torres drove in 4 runs and rookie pitcher Deivi García earned his first major league win, pitching 7 innings and giving up two earned runs. After losing this series, the Yankees boasted a 22–21 record and were caught sitting at the edge of the playoff bubble.

September 11 - September 13 vs. Baltimore Orioles

Heading into the middle of September, the Yankees tangoed with the Baltimore Orioles one last time. After losing their last series to the Orioles, the Yankees responded with a resounding four-game sweep at Yankee Stadium. Game one was 6–0 shutout win by the Yankees led by Gerrit Cole, who was back to his winning ways, improving to 5–3 on the season. The Yankees offense provided three home runs, accounting for five runs. Game two had a similar outcome, as the Yankees won 10–1, powered by offensive slugger Luke Voit. Voit hit a pair of three-run home runs and accounted for six of the ten Yankees RBIs. This was home run 15 and 16 for Voit, moving him up the leaderboard for most home runs in MLB. In game three, the Yankees scraped out a 2–1 win in extra innings, with Luke Voit being the hero again, hitting a game-winning sacrifice fly in the 10th inning. In the Yankees' last game against the Orioles, they walked away with a 3–1 victory. Gleyber Torres punched a go-ahead double in the 8th, securing the series sweep for the Yankees.

September 15 - September 17 vs. Toronto Blue Jays

With the Yankees now sitting at 26–21, they took on the Toronto Blue Jays for their second of three meetings that season. The Blue Jays were a half-game ahead of the Yankees in their division, with just over 10 games left in the season. With a lot of playoff implications on the line, the Yankees completed back-to-back sweeps, beating the Jays substantially in all three series games. The Yankees won game one 20–6 in what was their highest scoring game of the season. DJ LeMahieu, Luke Voit, and Gary Sánchez combined for 14 of the Yankees 20 runs, while Deivi García continued his high-performance pitching, logging seven innings and allowing three earned runs. The following game had a very similar storyline, with the Yankees winning 13–2. Both DJ LeMahieu and Luke Voit carried the offense with addition to a five-RBI performance by catcher Kyle Higashioka. Gerrit Cole went 7 innings, striking out 8 and allowing one earned run. The final game of the series was a 10–7 victory for the Yankees and featured plenty of Yankee star power as the team hit five home runs in one inning. Completing the series sweep put the Yankees on an eight-game winning streak and ahead of the Blue Jays in their division. The Yankees also became the first team since 1901 to hit six or more home runs in each of three consecutive games.

September 18 - September 20 vs. Boston Red Sox

With 10 games left in the season, the Yankees faced a familiar foe in the Boston Red Sox. The Red Sox had been very successful in the past couple years, but now sat at the bottom of the AL East with a 19–32 record. Game one of the series was a positive sign for the Yankees as their two all-stars Aaron Judge and Giancarlo Stanton were back from injury. In a very tight game, the Yankees pushed ahead in extra innings, winning the game 6–5. Game 2 showed an all-around performance from the Yankees, winning 8–0. The Yankees offense provided 11 hits and pitcher J. A. Happ had his best performance of the season, going 8 innings, 0 earned runs and 9 strikeouts. The Yankees win streak was now at 10 games. However, in the last game of the series, the Red Sox rebounded for a 10–2 win over the Yankees. Deivi García had a shaky outing, giving up six earned runs in 3 innings. Despite this loss, the Yankees had clinched a playoff berth for the 4th consecutive year. The Yankees and the Red Sox played 10 games over the course of the season with the Yankees winning nine of them, asserting themselves over their long-time division rivals.

September 21 - September 24 vs. Toronto Blue Jays

In the penultimate series of the season, the Yankees and the Toronto Blue Jays met for the final time of the season. The Yankees had just come off clinching a playoff spot, while the Blue Jays, sitting at 27–26, were right on the playoff fringe. The Yankees lost game one of the four-game series by a score of 11–5. Yankees pitcher Michael King got the start, going 2.2 innings and giving up 5 earned runs. Game 2 went in favor of the Yankees who won 12–1. A 15-hit game from the Yankees offense as well as one of Gerrit Cole's strongest performances gave the Yankees the win. In his final start of the season, Cole went for seven innings, gave up one earned run and struck out seven, earning him a 7–3 record atop a 2.84 ERA in his first year with the Yankees. The Yankees lost their last two games to the Blue Jays, 14-1 and 4-1 respectively. The Yankees went 1–3 in the final series against the Blue Jays, giving the Yankees a 32–25 record and a playoff spot already on lock.

September 25 - September 27 vs. Miami Marlins

In the final series of the 2020 MLB season, the Yankees play the Miami Marlins both the first and last time. The Miami Marlins were also playoff contenders and were playing must-win baseball to make the postseason. With the Yankees already owning their playoff berth, there was less of an implication for them in these final regular season games. The Yankees lost game 1 of the series 4–3 in a very tight game. The Yankees lost, and the Marlins secured a playoff berth. The Yankees won game two of the series 11–4. Starting their offensive display. Luke Voit powered his league leading 22nd home run and DJ LeMahieu continued to impress with a four hit night and a .359 batting average overall. Rookie pitcher Deivi García was also able to notch his third win before the season ended. The Yankees final game of the season was a 5-0 loss. DJ LeMahieu recorded another multi-hit game, bumping his season average to .364 and earning himself the American League Batting Title, while Luke Voit's 22 home runs earned himself the American League Home Run Title. Voit and LeMahieu were the first teammates to lead MLB in home runs and batting average since 1959. The Yankees finished the season with a 33–27 and earned the fifth seed in the American League postseason.

== Season standings ==
=== American League East ===
AL East
Team	W	L	Pct.	GB	Home	Road
Tampa Bay Rays	40	20	.667	—	20‍–‍9	20‍–‍11
New York Yankees	33	27	.550	7	22‍–‍9	11‍–‍18
Toronto Blue Jays	32	28	.533	8	17‍–‍9	15‍–‍19
Baltimore Orioles	25	35	.417	15	13‍–‍20	12‍–‍15
Boston Red Sox	24	36	.400	16	11‍–‍20	13‍–‍16

=== American League Wild Card ===
Division leaders
Team	W	L	Pct.
Tampa Bay Rays	40	20	.667
Oakland Athletics	36	24	.600
Minnesota Twins	36	24	.600

Division 2nd place
Team	W	L	Pct.
Cleveland Indians	35	25	.583
New York Yankees	33	27	.550
Houston Astros	29	31	.483

Wild Card teams (Top 2 teams qualify for postseason)
Team	W	L	Pct.	GB
Chicago White Sox	35	25	.583	+3
Toronto Blue Jays	32	28	.533	—
Seattle Mariners	27	33	.450	5
Los Angeles Angels	26	34	.433	6
Kansas City Royals	26	34	.433	6
Baltimore Orioles	25	35	.417	7
Boston Red Sox	24	36	.400	8
Detroit Tigers	23	35	.397	8
Texas Rangers	22	38	.367	10

=== Record against opponents ===
2020 American League record Source: MLB Standings Grid – 2020
Team	BAL	BOS	NYY	TB	TOR	NL
Baltimore	—	5–5	3–7	4–6	2–8	11–9
Boston	5–5	—	1–9	3–7	5–5	10–10
New York	7–3	9–1	—	2–8	5–5	10–10
Tampa Bay	6–4	7–3	8–2	—	6–4	13–7
Toronto	8–2	5–5	5–5	4–6	—	10–10

== Roster ==
2020 New York Yankees
Roster
Pitchers: 84 Albert Abreu; 70 Luis Avilán; 53 Zack Britton; 85 Luis Cessa; 54 Aroldis Chapman; 45 Gerrit Cole; 83 Deivi García; 57 Chad Green; 75 David Hale; 33 J. A. Happ; 61 Ben Heller; 56 Jonathan Holder; 48 Tommy Kahnle; 73 Michael King; 82 Brooks Kriske; 43 Jonathan Loáisiga; 58 Tyler Lyons; 47 Jordan Montgomery; 79 Nick Nelson; 0 Adam Ottavino; 65 James Paxton; 86 Clarke Schmidt; 19 Masahiro Tanaka; 89 Miguel Yajure	Catchers: 66 Kyle Higashioka; 38 Erik Kratz; 24 Gary Sánchez; Infielders: 71 Thairo Estrada; 72 Mike Ford; 26 DJ LeMahieu; 22 Jordy Mercer; 25 Gleyber Torres; 29 Gio Urshela; 59 Luke Voit; 14 Tyler Wade	Outfielders: 41 Miguel Andújar; 90 Estevan Florial; 77 Clint Frazier; 11 Brett Gardner; 31 Aaron Hicks; 99 Aaron Judge; 27 Giancarlo Stanton; 39 Mike Tauchman	Manager: 17 Aaron Boone; Coaches: 67 Matt Blake (pitching); -- Radley Haddad (bullpen catcher); 60 Mike Harkey (bullpen); 64 Carlos Mendoza (bench/infield); 88 Phil Nevin (third base); 63 P. J. Pilittere (asst. hitting); 68 Tanner Swanson (quality control/catching); 62 Marcus Thames (hitting); -- Brett Weber (assistant coach/instant replay); 50 Reggie Willits (first base/outfield)

== Player stats ==
=== Batting ===
Note: G = Games played; AB = At bats; R = Runs; H = Hits; 2B = Doubles; 3B = Triples; HR = Home runs; RBI = Runs batted in; SB = Stolen bases; BB = walks; AVG = Batting average; SLG = Slugging average

Player	G	AB	R	H	2B	3B	HR	RBI	SB	BB	AVG	SLG
Luke Voit	56	213	41	59	5	0	22	52	0	17	.277	.610
DJ LeMahieu	50	195	41	71	10	2	10	27	3	18	.364	.590
Aaron Hicks	54	169	28	38	10	2	6	21	4	41	.225	.414
Gary Sánchez	49	156	19	23	4	0	10	24	0	18	.147	.365
Gio Urshela	43	151	24	45	11	0	6	30	1	18	.298	.490
Gleyber Torres	42	136	17	33	8	0	3	16	1	22	.243	.368
Clint Frazier	39	131	24	35	6	1	8	26	3	25	.267	.511
Brett Gardner	49	130	20	29	5	1	5	15	3	26	.223	.392
Aaron Judge	28	101	23	26	3	0	9	22	0	10	.257	.554
Mike Tauchman	43	95	18	23	6	0	0	14	6	14	.242	.305
Tyler Wade	52	88	19	15	3	0	3	10	4	12	.170	.307
Giancarlo Stanton	23	76	12	19	7	0	4	11	1	15	.250	.500
Mike Ford	29	74	5	10	4	0	2	11	0	7	.135	.270
Miguel Andújar	21	62	5	15	2	1	1	5	0	3	.242	.355
Thairo Estrada	26	48	8	8	0	0	1	3	1	1	.167	.229
Kyle Higashioka	16	48	7	12	1	0	4	10	0	0	.250	.521
Erik Kratz	16	28	2	9	2	0	0	4	0	2	.321	.393
Jordy Mercer	6	11	1	2	0	0	0	0	0	2	.182	.182
Estevan Florial	1	3	0	1	0	0	0	0	0	0	.333	.333
Team totals	60	1915	315	473	87	7	94	301	27	251	.247	.447

=== Pitching ===
Note: W = Wins; L = Losses; ERA = Earned run average; G = Games pitched; GS = Games started; SV = Saves; IP = Innings pitched; H = Hits allowed; R = Runs allowed; ER = Earned runs allowed; BB = Walks allowed; SO = Strikeouts

Player	W	L	ERA	G	GS	SV	IP	H	R	ER	BB	SO
Gerrit Cole	7	3	2.84	12	12	0	73.0	53	27	23	17	94
J. A. Happ	2	2	3.47	9	9	0	49.1	37	19	19	15	42
Masahiro Tanaka	3	3	3.56	10	10	0	48.0	48	25	19	8	44
Jordan Montgomery	2	3	5.11	10	10	0	44.0	48	27	25	9	47
Deivi García	3	2	4.98	6	6	0	34.1	35	20	19	6	33
Michael King	1	2	7.76	9	4	0	26.2	30	23	23	11	26
Chad Green	3	3	3.51	22	0	1	25.2	13	13	10	8	32
Jonathan Loáisiga	3	0	3.52	12	3	0	23.0	21	11	9	7	22
Jonathan Holder	3	0	4.98	18	0	0	21.2	25	13	12	11	14
Luis Cessa	0	0	3.32	16	0	1	21.2	20	10	8	7	17
Nick Nelson	1	0	4.79	11	0	0	20.2	20	13	11	11	18
James Paxton	1	1	6.64	5	5	0	20.1	23	17	15	7	26
Zach Britton	1	2	1.89	20	0	8	19.0	12	6	4	7	16
Adam Ottavino	2	3	5.89	24	0	0	18.1	20	12	12	9	25
Aroldis Chapman	1	1	3.09	13	0	3	11.2	6	4	4	4	22
Luis Avilán	0	0	4.32	10	0	0	8.1	9	4	4	5	9
Miguel Yajure	0	0	1.29	3	0	0	7.0	3	1	1	5	8
Clarke Schmidt	0	1	7.11	3	1	0	6.1	7	5	5	5	7
David Hale	0	0	3.00	5	0	1	6.0	7	2	2	3	7
Ben Heller	0	0	3.00	6	0	0	6.0	5	2	2	2	6
Brooks Kriske	0	0	14.73	4	0	0	3.2	3	6	6	7	8
Erik Kratz	0	0	9.00	2	0	0	2.0	2	2	2	0	0
Tyler Lyons	0	0	21.60	1	0	0	1.2	3	4	4	1	0
Albert Abreu	0	1	20.25	2	0	0	1.1	4	4	3	2	2
Tommy Kahnle	0	0	0.00	1	0	0	1.0	1	0	0	1	3
Team totals	33	27	4.35	60	60	14	500.2	455	270	242	168	528

== Game log ==
Legend
	Yankees win
	Yankees loss
	Postponement
**Bold**	Yankees team member

=== Regular season ===
On August 13, the Yankees were supposed to play against the Chicago White Sox in the first MLB at Field of Dreams game in Dyersville, Iowa. But due to the pandemic and the MLB commissioner implementing the same division match ups (for example AL Central vs. NL Central) to restrict travel for the shortened season, the St. Louis Cardinals took their spot in the game before the Cardinals had their COVID-19 outbreak which pushed back the game to 2021. MLB announced on November 23 that the Yankees will face the White Sox on August 12, 2021.

Note: Attendance number not shown, as all games were played behind closed doors.

2020 game log: 33–27 (Home: 22–9; Away: 11–18)
July: 5–1 (Home: 1–0; Away: 4–1)

#	Date	Opponent	Score	Win	Loss	Save	Stadium	Record
1	July 23	@ Nationals	4–1 (6)	**Cole** (1–0)	Scherzer (0–1)	—	Nationals Park	1–0
2	July 25	@ Nationals	2–9	Rainey (1–0)	**Paxton** (0–1)	—	Nationals Park	1–1
3	July 26	@ Nationals	3–2	**Green** (1–0)	Doolittle (0–1)	**Britton** (1)	Nationals Park	2–1
—	July 27	@ Phillies	Postponed (COVID-19); Makeup: August 5					
—	July 28	@ Phillies	Postponed (COVID-19); Makeup: August 6					
—	July 29	Phillies	Postponed (COVID-19); Makeup: August 3					
4	July 29	@ Orioles	9–3	**Cole** (2–0)	Wojciechowski (0–1)	—	Oriole Park at Camden Yards	3–1
—	July 30	Phillies	Postponed (COVID-19); Makeup: August 4					
5	July 30	@ Orioles	8–6	**Loáisiga** (1–0)	Sulser (0–1)	**Britton** (2)	Oriole Park at Camden Yards	4–1
6	July 31	Red Sox	5–1	**Montgomery** (1–0)	Weber (0–2)	—	**Yankee Stadium**	5–1

August: 14–13 (Home: 11–6; Away: 3–7)

#	Date	Opponent	Score	Win	Loss	Save	Stadium	Record
7	August 1	Red Sox	5–2	**Nelson** (1–0)	Godley (0–1)	**Hale** (1)	**Yankee Stadium**	6–1
8	August 2	Red Sox	9–7	**Ottavino** (1–0)	Barnes (0–1)	**Britton** (3)	**Yankee Stadium**	7–1
9	August 3	Phillies	6–3	**Cole** (3–0)	Arrieta (0–1)	**Britton** (4)	**Yankee Stadium**	8–1
10	August 5	Phillies	7–11 (7)	Wheeler (2–0)	**Happ** (0–1)	Neris (1)	**Citizens Bank Park**	8–2
11	August 5	@ Phillies	3–1 (7)	**Ottavino** (2–0)	Hunter (0–1)	**Britton** (5)	Citizens Bank Park	9–2
12	August 6	@ Phillies	4–5	Guerra (1–0)	**Montgomery** (1–1)	Neris (2)	Citizens Bank Park	9–3
13	August 7	@ Rays	0–1	Roe (2–0)	**Ottavino** (2–1)	—	Tropicana Field	9–4
14	August 8	@ Rays	8–4 (7)	**Green** (2–0)	Glasnow (0–1)	—	Tropicana Field	10–4
15	August 8	@ Rays	3–5 (7)	Fairbanks (2–1)	**King** (0–1)	Anderson (2)	Tropicana Field	10–5
16	August 9	@ Rays	3–4	Thompson (1–0)	**Britton** (0–1)	—	Tropicana Field	10–6
17	August 11	Braves	9–6	**Montgomery** (2–1)	Toussaint (0–1)	**Britton** (6)	**Yankee Stadium**	11–6
18	August 12	Braves	6–3	**Loáisiga** (2–0)	Matzek (2–1)	**Britton** (7)	**Yankee Stadium**	12–6
19	August 14	Red Sox	10–3	**Cole** (4–0)	Brewer (0–1)	—	**Yankee Stadium**	13–6
20	August 15	Red Sox	11–5	**Paxton** (1–1)	Eovaldi (1–2)	—	**Yankee Stadium**	14–6
21	August 16	Red Sox	4–2	**Happ** (1–1)	Mazza (0–1)	**Britton** (8)	**Yankee Stadium**	15–6
22	August 17	Red Sox	6–3	**King** (1–1)	Pérez (2–3)	—	**Yankee Stadium**	16–6
23	August 18	Rays	3–6	Snell (2–0)	**Tanaka** (0–1)	Roe (1)	**Yankee Stadium**	16–7
24	August 19	Rays	2–4	Fairbanks (3–1)	**Britton** (0–2)	Beeks (1)	**Yankee Stadium**	16–8
25	August 20	Rays	5–10	Castillo (2–0)	**Ottavino** (2–2)	—	**Yankee Stadium**	16–9
—	August 21	@ Mets	Postponed (COVID-19); Makeup: August 30					
—	August 22	@ Mets	Postponed (COVID-19); Makeup: August 28					
—	August 23	@ Mets	Postponed (COVID-19); Makeup: September 3					
—	August 25	@ Braves	Postponed (inclement weather: rain); Makeup date: August 26th (doubleheader)					
26	August 26	@ Braves	1–5 (7)	Anderson (1–0)	**Cole** (4–1)	—	Truist Park	16–10
27	August 26	@ Braves	1–2 (7)	Fried (5–0)	**Green** (2–1)	Melancon (5)	Truist Park	16–11
28	August 28	Mets	4–6	Lockett (1–0)	**Green** (2–2)	Díaz (2)	**Yankee Stadium**	16–12
29	August 28	@ Mets	3–4	Hughes (1–1)	**Chapman** (0–1)	—	**Yankee Stadium**	16–13
30	August 29	Mets	2–1	**Chapman** (1–1)	Betances (0–1)	—	**Yankee Stadium**	17–13
31	August 30	Mets	8–7 (8)	**Green** (3–2)	Díaz (1–1)		**Yankee Stadium**	18–13
32	August 30	@ Mets	5–2 (8)	**Holder** (1–0)	Smith (0–1)	**Cessa** (1)	**Yankee Stadium**	19–13
33	August 31	Rays	3–5	Glasnow (2–1)	**Cole** (4–2)	Castillo (3)	**Yankee Stadium**	19–14

September: 14–13 (Home: 9–3; Away: 5–10)

#	Date	Opponent	Score	Win	Loss	Save	Stadium	Record
34	September 1	Rays	5–3	**Tanaka** (1–1)	Thompson (1–2)	**Chapman** (1)	**Yankee Stadium**	20–14
35	September 2	Rays	2–5	Curtiss (2–0)	**Montgomery** (2–2)	—	**Yankee Stadium**	20–15
36	September 3	@ Mets	7–9 (10)	Díaz (2–1)	**Abreu** (0–1)	—	Citi Field	20–16
37	September 4	@ Orioles	6–5 (9)	**Holder** (2–0)	Lakins (2–2)	**Green** (1)	Oriole Park at Camden Yards	21–16
38	September 4	@ Orioles	3–6	López (1–0)	**García** (0–1)	Valdez (1)	Oriole Park at Camden Yards	21–17
39	September 5	@ Orioles	1–6	Tate (1–0)	**Cole** (4–3)	—	Oriole Park at Camden Yards	21–18
40	September 6	@ Orioles	1–5	Kremer (1–0)	**Tanaka** (1–2)	—	Oriole Park at Camden Yards	21–19
41	September 7	@ Blue Jays	7–12	Reid-Foley (1–0)	**Ottavino** (2–3)	—	Sahlen Field	21–20
42	September 8	@ Blue Jays	1–2	Yamaguchi (2–3)	**Happ** (1–2)	Dolis (3)	Sahlen Field	21–21
43	September 9	@ Blue Jays	7–2	**García** (1–1)	Stripling (3–3)	—	Sahlen Field	22–21
44	September 11	Orioles	6–0 (7)	**Cole** (5–3)	Cobb (1–4)	—	**Yankee Stadium**	23–21
45	September 11	Orioles	10–1 (7)	**Tanaka** (2–2)	Akin (0–1)	–	**Yankee Stadium**	24–21
46	September 12	Orioles	2–1 (10)	**Holder** (3–0)	Harvey (0–2)	—	**Yankee Stadium**	25–21
47	September 13	Orioles	3–1	**Britton** (1–2)	Tate (1–1)	**Chapman** (2)	**Yankee Stadium**	26–21
48	September 15	Blue Jays	20–6	**García** (2–1)	Walker (3–3)	—	**Yankee Stadium**	27–21
49	September 16	Blue Jays	13–2	**Cole** (6–3)	Roark (2–2)	—	**Yankee Stadium**	28–21
50	September 17	Blue Jays	10–7	**Tanaka** (3–2)	Anderson (0–2)	**Chapman** (3)	**Yankee Stadium**	29–21
51	September 18	@ Red Sox	6–5 (12)	**Loáisiga** (3–0)	Weber (1–3)	—	Fenway Park	30–21
52	September 19	@ Red Sox	8–0	**Happ** (2–2)	Mazza (1–2)	—	Fenway Park	31–21
53	September 20	@ Red Sox	2–10	Houck (2–0)	**García** (2–2)	—	Fenway Park	31–22
54	September 21	@ Blue Jays	5–11	Zeuch (1–0)	**King** (1–2)	—	Sahlen Field	31–23
55	September 22	@ Blue Jays	12–1	**Cole** (7–3)	Roark (2–3)	—	Sahlen Field	32–23
56	September 23	@ Blue Jays	1–14	Cole (3–0)	**Tanaka** (3–3)	Stripling (1)	Sahlen Field	32–24
57	September 24	@ Blue Jays	1–4	Ryu (5–2)	**Montgomery** (2–3)	Dolis (5)	Sahlen Field	32–25
58	September 25	Marlins	3–4 (10)	Boxberger (1–0)	**Green** (3–3)	Kintzler (12)	**Yankee Stadium**	32–26
59	September 26	Marlins	11–4	**García** (3–2)	Tarpley (2–2)	—	**Yankee Stadium**	33–26
60	September 27	Marlins	0–5	Castano (1–2)	**Schmidt** (0–1)	—	**Yankee Stadium**	33–27

=== Postseason ===
2020 Postseason game log (4–3) (Home: 1–1; Away: 3–2)
American League Wild Card Series: 2–0 (Home: 0–0; Away 2–0)

#	Date	Opponent	Stadium	Score	Win	Loss	Save	Attendance	Series
1	September 29	@ Indians	Progressive Field	12–3	**Cole** (1–0)	Bieber (0–1)	—	N/A	1–0
2	September 30	@ Indians	Progressive Field	10–9	**Chapman** (1–0)	Hand (0–1)	—	N/A	2–0

American League Division Series: 2–3 (Home: 1–1; Away 1–2)

#	Date	Opponent	Stadium	Score	Win	Loss	Save	Attendance	Series
1	October 5	@ Rays	Petco Park	9–3	**Cole** (1–0)	Snell (0–1)	—	N/A	1–0
2	October 6	@ Rays	Petco Park	5–7	Glasnow (1–0)	**Happ** (0–1)	Fairbanks (1)	N/A	1–1
3	October 7	Rays	Petco Park	4–8	Morton (1–0)	**Tanaka** (0–1)	—	N/A	1–2
4	October 8	Rays	Petco Park	5–1	**Green** (1–0)	Thompson (0–1)	**Chapman** (1)	N/A	2–2
5	October 9	@ Rays	Petco Park	1–2	Castillo (1–0)	**Chapman** (0–1)	—	N/A	2–3

* = Divisional Games

== Postseason rosters ==
Playoff rosters
American League Wild Card Series

- Pitchers: 0 Adam Ottavino 19 Masahiro Tanaka 33 J. A. Happ 43 Jonathan Loáisiga 45 Gerrit Cole 47 Jordan Montgomery 53 Zack Britton 54 Aroldis Chapman 56 Jonathan Holder 57 Chad Green 79 Nick Nelson 83 Deivi García 85 Luis Cessa
- Catchers: 24 Gary Sánchez 38 Erik Kratz 66 Kyle Higashioka
- Infielders: 14 Tyler Wade 25 Gleyber Torres 26 DJ LeMahieu 29 Gio Urshela 59 Luke Voit 72 Mike Ford
- Outfielders: 11 Brett Gardner 31 Aaron Hicks 39 Mike Tauchman 77 Clint Frazier 99 Aaron Judge
- Designated hitters: 27 Giancarlo Stanton

American League Division Series

- Pitchers: 0 Adam Ottavino 19 Masahiro Tanaka 33 J. A. Happ 43 Jonathan Loáisiga 45 Gerrit Cole 47 Jordan Montgomery 53 Zack Britton 54 Aroldis Chapman 56 Jonathan Holder 57 Chad Green 73 Michael King 79 Nick Nelson 83 Deivi García 85 Luis Cessa
- Catchers: 24 Gary Sánchez 66 Kyle Higashioka
- Infielders: 14 Tyler Wade 25 Gleyber Torres 26 DJ LeMahieu 29 Gio Urshela 59 Luke Voit 72 Mike Ford
- Outfielders: 11 Brett Gardner 31 Aaron Hicks 39 Mike Tauchman 77 Clint Frazier 99 Aaron Judge
- Designated hitters: 27 Giancarlo Stanton

== Farm system ==
Level	Team	League	Manager
AAA	Scranton/Wilkes-Barre RailRiders	International League	Doug Davis
AA	Trenton Thunder	Eastern League	Pat Osborn
A	Tampa Tarpons	Florida State League	Aaron Holbert
A	Charleston RiverDogs	South Atlantic League	Louis Dorante
A-Short Season	Staten Island Yankees	New York–Penn League	David Adams
Rookie	Pulaski Yankees	Appalachian League	Tyler Blaser
Rookie	GCL Yankees 1 (East)	Gulf Coast League	Dan Fiorito
Rookie	GCL Yankees 2 (West)	Gulf Coast League	Nick Ortiz
Rookie	DSL Yankees 1	Dominican Summer League	Caonabo Cosme
Rookie	DSL Yankees 2	Dominican Summer League	Caonabo Cosme

== Finances ==
For 2020 Team Marketing Report has calculated 5 billion dollars in losses for Major League Baseball. TMR estimated that the New York Yankees lost $437 million in revenue as a result of not having fans attend games.
