= 2020 Baltimore Orioles season =

Major League Baseball season

2020 Baltimore Orioles
- League: American League
- Division: East
- Ballpark: Oriole Park at Camden Yards
- City: Baltimore, Maryland
- Record: 25–35 (.417)
- Divisional place: 4th
- Owners: Peter Angelos
- General managers: Mike Elias
- Managers: Brandon Hyde
- Television: MASN (Gary Thorne, Jim Palmer, Mike Bordick, Jim Hunter)
- Radio: WJZ-FM; Baltimore Orioles Radio Network (Jim Hunter, Ben McDonald, Mike Bordick, Kevin Brown, Melanie Newman)

The 2020 Baltimore Orioles season was the 120th season in Baltimore Orioles franchise history, the 67th in Baltimore, and the 29th at Oriole Park at Camden Yards. The season was the Orioles' second under manager Brandon Hyde. They finished the pandemic-shortened season 25–35, their best 60-game stretch since 2017. The Orioles had their highest winning percentage since 2017 when they went 75–87. Despite these improvements, they missed the playoffs for the fourth consecutive season as they were eliminated from playoff contention on September 22.

== Regular season standings ==
=== American League East ===
AL East
Team	W	L	Pct.	GB	Home	Road
Tampa Bay Rays	40	20	.667	—	20‍–‍9	20‍–‍11
New York Yankees	33	27	.550	7	22‍–‍9	11‍–‍18
Toronto Blue Jays	32	28	.533	8	17‍–‍9	15‍–‍19
Baltimore Orioles	25	35	.417	15	13‍–‍20	12‍–‍15
Boston Red Sox	24	36	.400	16	11‍–‍20	13‍–‍16

=== American League Wild Card ===
Division leaders
Team	W	L	Pct.
Tampa Bay Rays	40	20	.667
Oakland Athletics	36	24	.600
Minnesota Twins	36	24	.600

Division 2nd place
Team	W	L	Pct.
Cleveland Indians	35	25	.583
New York Yankees	33	27	.550
Houston Astros	29	31	.483

Wild Card teams (Top 2 teams qualify for postseason)
Team	W	L	Pct.	GB
Chicago White Sox	35	25	.583	+3
Toronto Blue Jays	32	28	.533	—
Seattle Mariners	27	33	.450	5
Los Angeles Angels	26	34	.433	6
Kansas City Royals	26	34	.433	6
Baltimore Orioles	25	35	.417	7
Boston Red Sox	24	36	.400	8
Detroit Tigers	23	35	.397	8
Texas Rangers	22	38	.367	10

=== Record vs. opponents ===
2020 American League record Source: MLB Standings Grid – 2020
Team	BAL	BOS	NYY	TB	TOR	NL
Baltimore	—	5–5	3–7	4–6	2–8	11–9
Boston	5–5	—	1–9	3–7	5–5	10–10
New York	7–3	9–1	—	2–8	5–5	10–10
Tampa Bay	6–4	7–3	8–2	—	6–4	13–7
Toronto	8–2	5–5	5–5	4–6	—	10–10

== Game log ==
Past games legend
Orioles Win (#bfb)	Orioles Loss (#fbb)	Game postponed (#bbb)	Eliminated from playoff contention (#933)
Bold denotes an Orioles pitcher

Future Games Legend
Home Game	Away Game

2020 Game Log: 25–35 (.417) (Home: 13–17; Away: 12–18)
July: 3–3 (Home: 1–2; Away: 2–1)

#	Date	Opponent	Score	Win	Loss	Save	Record	Box/ Streak
1	July 24	@ Red Sox	2–13	Eovaldi (1–0)	**Milone** (0–1)	—	0–1	L1
2	July 25	@ Red Sox	7–2	**Cobb** (1–0)	Pérez (0–1)	—	1–1	W1
3	July 26	@ Red Sox	7–4	**LeBlanc** (1–0)	Weber (0–1)	**Sulser** (1)	2–1	W2
—	July 27	@ Marlins	Postponed (COVID-19). Makeup Date August 5 as part of doubleheader					
—	July 28	@ Marlins	Postponed (COVID-19). Makeup Date August 6.					
—	July 29	Marlins	Postponed (COVID-19). Makeup Date August 4.					
—	July 30	Marlins	Postponed (COVID-19). Makeup Date August 5 as part of doubleheader.					
4	July 29	Yankees	3–9	Cole (2–0)	**Wojciechowski** (0–1)	—	2–2	L1
5	July 30	Yankees	6–8	Loáisiga (1–0)	**Sulser** (0–1)	Britton (2)	2–3	L2
6	July 31	Rays	6–3	**Fry** (1–0)	Fairbanks (1–1)	**Sulser** (2)	3–3	W1

August: 12–16 (Home: 5–9; Away: 7–7)

#	Date	Opponent	Score	Win	Loss	Save	Record	Box/ Streak
7	August 1	Rays	5–4 (11)	**Lakins** (1–0)	Drake (0–2)	—	4–3	W2
8	August 2	Rays	5–1	**Phillips** (1–0)	Beeks (0–1)	**Sulser** (3)	5–3	W3
—	August 3	Yankees	Postponed (COVID-19). Makeup Date September 4 as part of doubleheader.					
9	August 4	Marlins	0–4	López (1–0)	**Means** (0–1)	—	5–4	L1
10	August 5	Marlins	0–1 (7)	Vincent (1–0)	**Cobb** (1–1)	Kintzler (2)	5–5	L2
11	August 5	@ Marlins (Note: Games moved to Oriole Park at Camden Yards for safety concerns due to the COVID-19 pandemic "hot spot" in Florida.)	1–2 (7)	Moran (1–0)	**Wojciechowski** (0–2)	Tarpley (1)	5–6	L3
12	August 6	@ Marlins	7–8	Morin (1–0)	**Phillips** (1–1)	Kintzler (3)	5–7	L4
13	August 7	@ Nationals	11–0	**Milone** (1–1)	Sánchez (0–2)	—	6–7	W1
14	August 8	@ Nationals	5–3	**Armstrong** (1–0)	Hudson (1–1)	**Castro** (1)	7–7	W2
—	August 9	@ Nationals	Suspended (field issues). Orioles lead 5–2, 1 out, top of 6th inning, runners on 1st & 2nd. Completed on August 14.					
15	August 11	@ Phillies	10–9 (10)	**Sulser** (1–1)	Guerra (1–2)	**Lakins** (1)	8–7	W3
16	August 12	@ Phillies	5–4	**Armstrong** (2–0)	Eflin (0–1)	**Sulser** (4)	9–7	W4
17	August 13	@ Phillies	11–4	**Eshelman** (1–0)	Arrieta (1–2)	—	10–7	W5
18	August 14	@ Nationals (Note: Completion of game suspended on August 9. Game moved to Oriole Park at Camden Yards with Washington serving as the "home" team.)	6–2	**Lakins** (2–0)	Strasburg (0–1)	—	11–7	W6
19	August 14	Nationals	3–15	Fedde (1–1)	**Milone** (1–2)	—	11–8	L1
20	August 15	Nationals	7–3	**Wojciechowski** (1–2)	Corbin (2–1)	**Sulser** (5)	12–8	W1
21	August 16	Nationals	5–6	Scherzer (2–1)	**Lakins** (2–1)	Hudson (4)	12–9	L1
22	August 17	Blue Jays	2–7	Ryu (2–1)	**Cobb** (1–2)	—	12–10	L2
23	August 18	Blue Jays	7–8 (10)	Bass (1–0)	**Sulser** (1–2)	—	12–11	L3
24	August 19	Blue Jays	2–5	Roark (2–1)	**Milone** (1–3)	Dolis (1)	12–12	L4
25	August 20	Red Sox	1–7	Eovaldi (2–2)	**Wojciechowski** (1–3)	—	12–13	L5
26	August 21	Red Sox	5–8	Hernández (1–0)	**Means** (0–2)	Barnes (1)	12–14	L6
27	August 22	Red Sox	5–4 (10)	**Castro** (1–0)	Barnes (1–2)	—	13–14	W1
28	August 23	Red Sox	5–4	**Eshelman** (2–0)	Godley (0–3)	**Scott** (1)	14–14	W2
29	August 25	@ Rays	2–4	Glasnow (1–1)	**Milone** (1–4)	García (1)	14–15	L1
30	August 26	@ Rays	3–4	Sherriff (1–0)	**Givens** (0–1)	Castillo (1)	14–16	L2
—	August 27	@ Rays	Postponed (strikes due to shooting of Jacob Blake). Makeup Date: September 17.					
31	August 28	@ Blue Jays	4–5 (10)	Dolis (1–1)	**Sulser** (1–3)	—	14–17	L3
32	August 29	@ Blue Jays	0–5	Walker (3–2)	**Cobb** (1–3)	—	14–18	L4
33	August 30	@ Blue Jays	5–6	Bass (2–1)	**Sulser** (1–4)	—	14–19	L5
34	August 31	@ Blue Jays	4–3 (11)	**Valdez** (1–0)	Bass (2–2)	—	15–19	W1

September: 10–16 (Home: 7–6; Away: 3–10)

#	Date	Opponent	Score	Win	Loss	Save	Record	Box/ Streak
35	September 1	Mets	9–5	**Eshelman** (3–0)	Kilome (0–1)	—	16–19	W2
36	September 2	Mets	4–9	Peterson (4–1)	**Means** (0–3)	—	16–20	L1
37	September 4	Yankees	5–6 (9)	Holder (2–0)	**Lakins** (2–2)	Green (1)	16–21	L2
38	September 4	Yankees	6–3 (7)	**López** (1–0)	García (0–1)	**Valdez** (1)	17–21	W1
39	September 5	Yankees	6–1	**Tate** (1–0)	Cole (4–3)	—	18–21	W2
40	September 6	Yankees	5–1	**Kremer** (1–0)	Tanaka (1–2)	—	19–21	W3
41	September 8	@ Mets	11–2	**Means** (1–3)	Wacha (1–3)	—	20–21	W4
42	September 9	@ Mets	6–7	Familia (2–0)	**Harvey** (0–1)	Díaz (3)	20–22	L1
—	September 10	@ Yankees	Postponed (rain). Makeup Date September 11 as part of doubleheader					
43	September 11	@ Yankees	0–6 (7)	Cole (5–3)	**Cobb** (1–4)	—	20–23	L2
44	September 11	@ Yankees	1–10 (7)	Tanaka (2–2)	**Akin** (0–1)	—	20–24	L3
45	September 12	@ Yankees	1–2 (10)	Holder (3–0)	**Harvey** (0–2)	—	20–25	L4
46	September 13	@ Yankees	1–3	Britton (1–2)	**Tate** (1–1)	Chapman (2)	20–26	L5
47	September 14	Braves	14–1	**López** (2–0)	Toussaint (0–2)	—	21–26	W1
48	September 15	Braves	1–5	O'Day (4–0)	**Eshelman** (3–1)	—	21–27	L1
49	September 16	Braves	5–1	**Akin** (1–1)	Hamels (0–1)	—	22–27	W1
50	September 17	Rays	1–3 (7)	Castillo (3–0)	**Valdez** (1–1)	—	22–28	L1
51	September 17	@ Rays (Note: Game moved to Oriole Park at Camden Yards with Tampa Bay serving as the "home" team.)	6–10 (7)	Fairbanks (5–3)	**Sulser** (1–5)	—	22–29	L2
52	September 18	Rays	1–2	Glasnow (4–1)	**Cobb** (1–5)	Sherriff (1)	22–30	L3
53	September 19	Rays	1–3	Morton (2–2)	**López** (2–1)	Thompson (1)	22–31	L4
54	September 20	Rays	2–1	**Means** (2–3)	Yarbrough (1–4)	**Valdez** (2)	23–31	W1
55	September 22	@ Red Sox	3–8	Pivetta (1–0)	**Akin** (1–2)	Barnes (9)	23–32	L1
56	September 23	@ Red Sox	1–9	Eovaldi (4–2)	**Kremer** (1–1)	—	23–33	L2
57	September 24	@ Red Sox	13–1	**Cobb** (2–5)	Pérez (3–5)	—	24–33	W1
58	September 25	@ Blue Jays	5–10	Pearson (1–0)	**López** (2–2)	—	24–34	L1
59	September 26	@ Blue Jays	2–5	Anderson (1–2)	**Means** (2–4)	Bass (7)	24–35	L2
60	September 27	@ Blue Jays	7–5	**Lakins** (3–2)	Yamaguchi (2–4)	**Valdez** (3)	25–35	W1

== Roster ==
2020 Baltimore Orioles
Roster
Pitchers: 45 Keegan Akin; 43 Shawn Armstrong; 48 Richard Bleier; 49 Cody Carroll; 50 Miguel Castro; 17 Alex Cobb; 73 Tom Eshelman; 51 Paul Fry; 60 Carson Fulmer; 60 Mychal Givens; 56 Hunter Harvey; 41 David Hess; 52 Branden Kline; 64 Dean Kremer; 70 Travis Lakins; 23 Wade LeBlanc; 48 Jorge López; 47 John Means; 69 Tommy Milone; 58 Evan Phillips; 66 Tanner Scott; 54 Cole Sulser; 55 Dillon Tate; 62 César Valdez; 29 Asher Wojciechowski; 85 Bruce Zimmermann	Catchers: 36 Bryan Holaday; 28 Pedro Severino; 15 Chance Sisco; Infielders: 57 Hanser Alberto; 19 Chris Davis; 2 Dilson Herrera; 11 José Iglesias; 39 Renato Núñez; 14 Rio Ruiz; 87 Ramón Urías; 74 Pat Valaika; 13 Andrew Velazquez	Outfielders: 21 Austin Hays; 6 Ryan Mountcastle; 31 Cedric Mullins; 25 Anthony Santander; 35 Dwight Smith Jr.; 24 D. J. Stewart; 38 Mason Williams	Manager: 18 Brandon Hyde; Coaches: 26 Doug Brocail (pitching); 34 Tim Cossins (field coordinator/catching); 3 José David Flores (third base); 32 Fredi González (coach); 27 José Hernández (assistant hitting); 40 Darren Holmes (bullpen); 30 Don Long (hitting); 9 Anthony Sanders (first base)

== Player stats ==
=== Batting ===
Note: G = Games played; AB = At bats; R = Runs; H = Hits; 2B = Doubles; 3B = Triples; HR = Home runs; RBI = Runs batted in; SB = Stolen bases; BB = Walks; AVG = Batting average; SLG = Slugging average

Player	G	AB	R	H	2B	3B	HR	RBI	BB	SB	AVG	SLG
Hanser Alberto	54	219	35	62	15	0	3	22	3	5	.283	.393
Renato Núñez	52	195	29	50	10	0	12	31	0	17	.256	.492
Rio Ruiz	54	185	25	41	11	0	9	32	1	17	.222	.427
Pedro Severino	48	160	17	40	5	1	5	21	1	16	.250	.388
Anthony Santander	37	153	24	40	13	1	11	32	0	10	.261	.575
José Iglesias	39	142	16	53	17	0	3	24	0	3	.373	.556
Pat Valaika	52	141	24	39	4	0	8	16	0	8	.277	.475
Cedric Mullins	48	140	16	38	4	3	3	12	7	8	.271	.407
Ryan Mountcastle	35	126	12	42	5	0	5	23	0	11	.333	.492
Austin Hays	33	122	20	34	2	0	4	9	2	8	.279	.393
Chance Sisco	36	98	11	21	4	0	4	10	0	17	.214	.378
DJ Stewart	31	88	13	17	2	0	7	15	0	20	.193	.455
Dwight Smith Jr.	21	63	9	14	3	0	2	6	1	7	.222	.365
Andrew Velazquez	40	63	11	10	1	1	0	3	4	10	.159	.206
Chris Davis	16	52	3	6	3	0	0	1	0	3	.115	.173
Bryan Holaday	20	31	5	5	1	0	0	4	0	2	.161	.194
Ramón Urías	10	25	3	9	2	0	1	3	0	2	.360	.560
Mason Williams	10	18	0	2	0	1	0	0	0	0	.111	.222
Dilson Herrera	3	5	0	0	0	0	0	0	0	0	.000	.000
Team totals	60	2026	274	523	102	7	77	264	19	164	.258	.429

=== Pitching ===
Note: W = Wins; L = Losses; ERA = Earned run average; G = Games pitched; GS = Games started; SV = Saves; IP = Innings pitched; H = Hits allowed; R = Runs allowed; ER = Earned runs allowed; BB = Walks allowed; SO = Strikeouts

Player	W	L	ERA	G	GS	SV	IP	H	R	ER	BB	SO
Alex Cobb	2	5	4.30	10	10	0	52.1	52	27	25	18	38
John Means	2	4	4.53	10	10	0	43.2	36	22	22	7	42
Jorge López	2	2	6.34	9	6	0	38.1	43	30	27	12	28
Asher Wojciechowski	1	3	6.81	10	7	0	37.0	45	29	28	15	31
Thomas Eshelman	3	1	3.89	12	4	0	34.2	34	17	15	9	16
Tommy Milone	1	4	3.99	6	6	0	29.1	33	18	13	4	31
Keegan Akin	1	2	4.56	8	6	0	25.2	27	17	13	10	35
Travis Lakins	3	2	2.81	22	0	1	25.2	25	11	8	13	25
Cole Sulser	1	5	5.56	19	0	5	22.2	17	18	14	17	19
Wade LeBlanc	1	0	8.06	6	6	0	22.1	27	20	20	8	13
Paul Fry	1	0	2.45	22	0	0	22.0	22	7	6	9	29
Tanner Scott	0	0	1.31	25	0	1	20.2	12	5	3	10	23
Dean Kremer	1	1	4.82	4	4	0	18.2	15	10	10	12	22
Dillon Tate	1	1	3.24	12	0	0	16.2	9	7	6	5	14
Miguel Castro	1	0	4.02	16	0	1	15.2	17	7	7	5	24
Shawn Armstrong	2	0	1.80	14	0	0	15.0	9	6	3	3	14
Evan Phillips	1	1	5.02	14	0	0	14.1	14	8	8	10	20
César Valdez	1	1	1.26	9	0	3	14.1	7	3	2	3	12
Mychal Givens	0	1	1.38	12	0	0	13.0	7	2	2	6	19
Hunter Harvey	0	2	4.15	10	0	0	8.2	8	6	4	2	6
Bruce Zimmermann	0	0	7.71	2	1	0	7.0	6	6	6	2	7
David Hess	0	0	6.43	3	0	0	7.0	10	5	5	2	1
Branden Kline	0	0	1.80	3	0	0	5.0	2	1	1	3	7
Carson Fulmer	0	0	0.00	3	0	0	3.2	0	0	0	2	4
Richard Bleier	0	0	0.00	2	0	0	3.0	1	0	0	0	4
Cody Carroll	0	0	54.00	3	0	0	2.0	9	12	12	5	3
Bryan Holaday	0	0	0.00	1	0	0	0.1	2	0	0	0	0
Team totals	25	35	4.51	60	60	11	518.2	489	294	260	192	487

== Farm system ==
Due to safety concerns surrounding the COVID-19 pandemic, it was announced on June 30, 2020, that the 2020 Minor League Baseball season would not be played.

Level	Team	League	Manager
AAA	Norfolk Tides	International League	
AA	Bowie Baysox	Eastern League	
A-Advanced	Frederick Keys	Carolina League	
A	Delmarva Shorebirds	South Atlantic League	
Short-Season A	Aberdeen IronBirds	New York–Penn League	
Rookie	GCL Orioles	Gulf Coast League	
Rookie	DSL Orioles	Dominican Summer League	

== COVID-19 outbreak ==
On July 27, 2020, both away games against the Miami Marlins were postponed due to the COVID-19 pandemic, because there was a COVID outbreak in the Miami Marlins organization, and later the Orioles′ home games were also postponed. As a result, the Orioles played the New York Yankees on July 29–30.
