= Lakin (surname) =

Lakin is a surname. Notable people with the surname are as follows:

- Arad Simon Lakin (1810–1890), American Methodist minister, and university president
- B. R. Lakin (1901–1984), American Baptist preacher and evangelist
- Barklie Lakin (1914–2011), British industrialist
- Charlie Lakin (born 1999), English footballer
- Charles Ernest Lakin (1878–1972), English physician
- Christine Lakin (born 1979), American actress
- Cyril Lakin (1915–1993), Welsh politician and farmer
- Daniel Lakin (born 1834), American Civil War sailor and Medal of Honor recipient
- George W. Lakin (1816–1884), American schoolteacher and lawyer
- Kenneth Meade Lakin (1941–2014), American physicist
- Mervyn Lakin (1888–1954), Australian politician
- Sir Michael Henry Lakin (1846–1931), British businessman
- Rita Lakin (born 1930), American screenwriter
- Thomas Lakin (1840–??), U.S. Navy officer
- Travis Lakins Sr. (born 1994), American professional baseball player
- William Lakin Turner (1867–1936), English landscape artist
