= Lakin =

Lakin may refer to:

== People ==
- Lakin (surname), list of people with the surname

== Places ==
=== Asia ===
- Ləkin, Azerbaijan
- Lakin, Myanmar

=== United States ===
- Lakin Township, Barton County, Kansas, United States
- Lakin Township, Harvey County, Kansas, United States
- Lakin Township, Kearny County, Kansas, United States
- Lakin, Kansas, United States
- Lakin, West Virginia
- Lakin Township, Morrison County, Minnesota, United States

== Other ==
- E. L. Lakin, the original name of the Australian supermarket chain Flemings
- Lakin baronets, a title in the Baronetage of the United Kingdom
- Lakin Brook, a river in Delaware County, New York
- Lakin Dam, a planned dam on the N'Mai River near Lakin, Myanmar

== See also ==
- Lakinsk, Vladimir Oblast, Russia
