= Gio Urshela =

Colombian baseball player (born 1991)

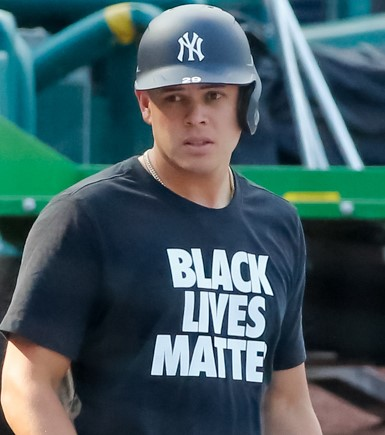
- Urshela with the New York Yankees in 2020
- Third baseman
- Born: October 11, 1991 (age 34); Cartagena, Colombia
- Batted: Right Threw: Right

MLB debut
- June 9, 2015, for the Cleveland Indians

Last MLB appearance
- August 13, 2025, for the Athletics

MLB statistics
- Batting average: .270
- Home runs: 73
- Runs batted in: 352
- Stats at Baseball Reference

Teams
- Cleveland Indians (2015, 2017); Toronto Blue Jays (2018); New York Yankees (2019–2021); Minnesota Twins (2022); Los Angeles Angels (2023); Detroit Tigers (2024); Atlanta Braves (2024); Athletics (2025)

Giovanny Urshela Salcedo (born October 11, 1991) is a Colombian former professional baseball third baseman who played in Major League Baseball (MLB) from 2015 to 2025. He played for the Cleveland Indians, Toronto Blue Jays, New York Yankees, Minnesota Twins, Los Angeles Angels, Detroit Tigers, Atlanta Braves, and Athletics. Urshela made his MLB debut in 2015 with Cleveland.

== Career ==
=== Cleveland Indians ===
Urshela signed with the Cleveland Indians as an international free agent in July 2008. He made his professional debut in 2009, playing for the Dominican Summer League Indians and the Arizona League Indians.

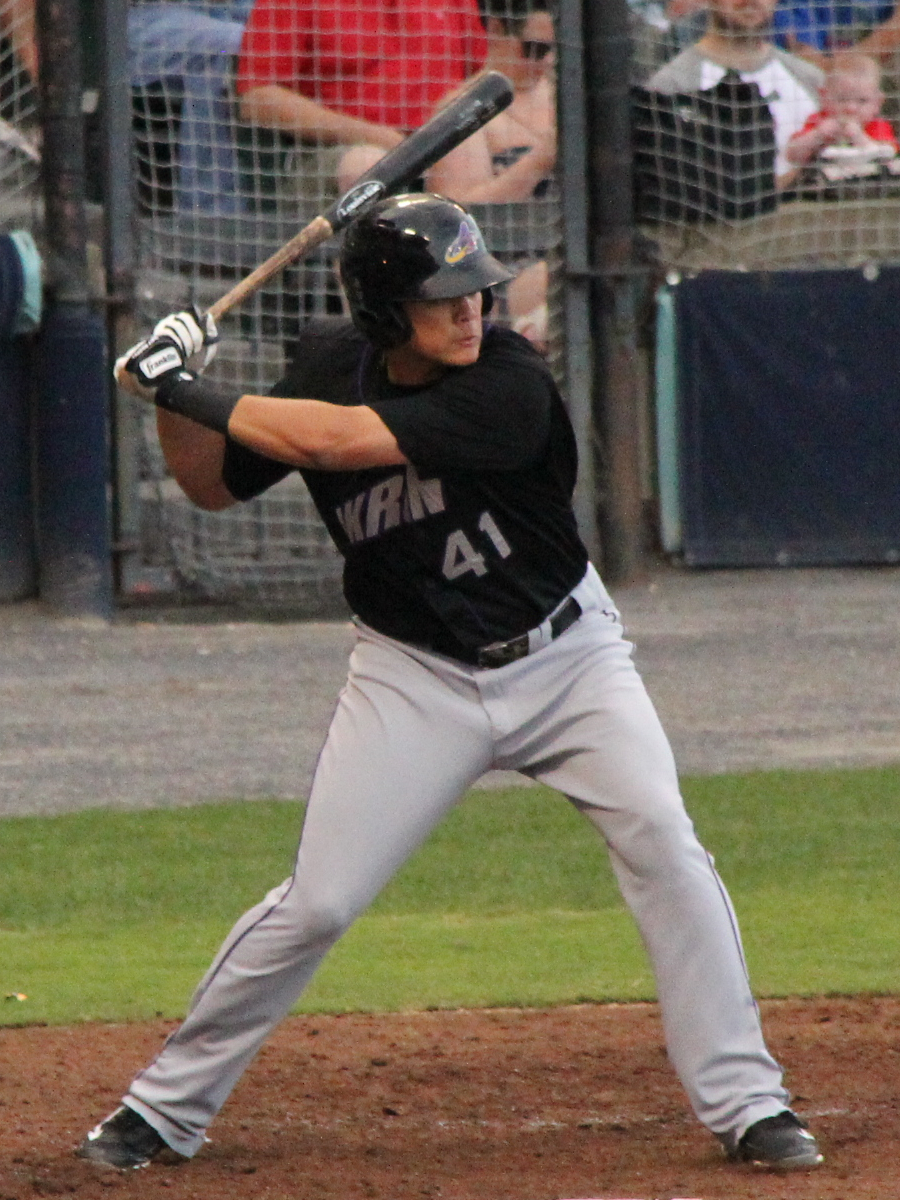
Urshela batting for the Akron Aeros in 2013

Urshela started the 2014 season with Akron and was promoted to the Columbus Clippers of the Class AAA International League during the season. After the 2014 season, the Indians added Urshela to their 40-man roster. He was named the Indians' fourth best prospect by MLB.com in 2015.

Urshela began the 2015 season with Columbus. He was called up to the major leagues on June 8, 2015. He got his first major league hit, a single, and first major league home run in the same game against the Seattle Mariners on June 11, 2015. He spent the entire 2016 season playing with Columbus and in the offseason he played winter baseball in the Venezuelan Professional Baseball League for Águilas del Zulia alongside future Yankees teammate Mike Tauchman.

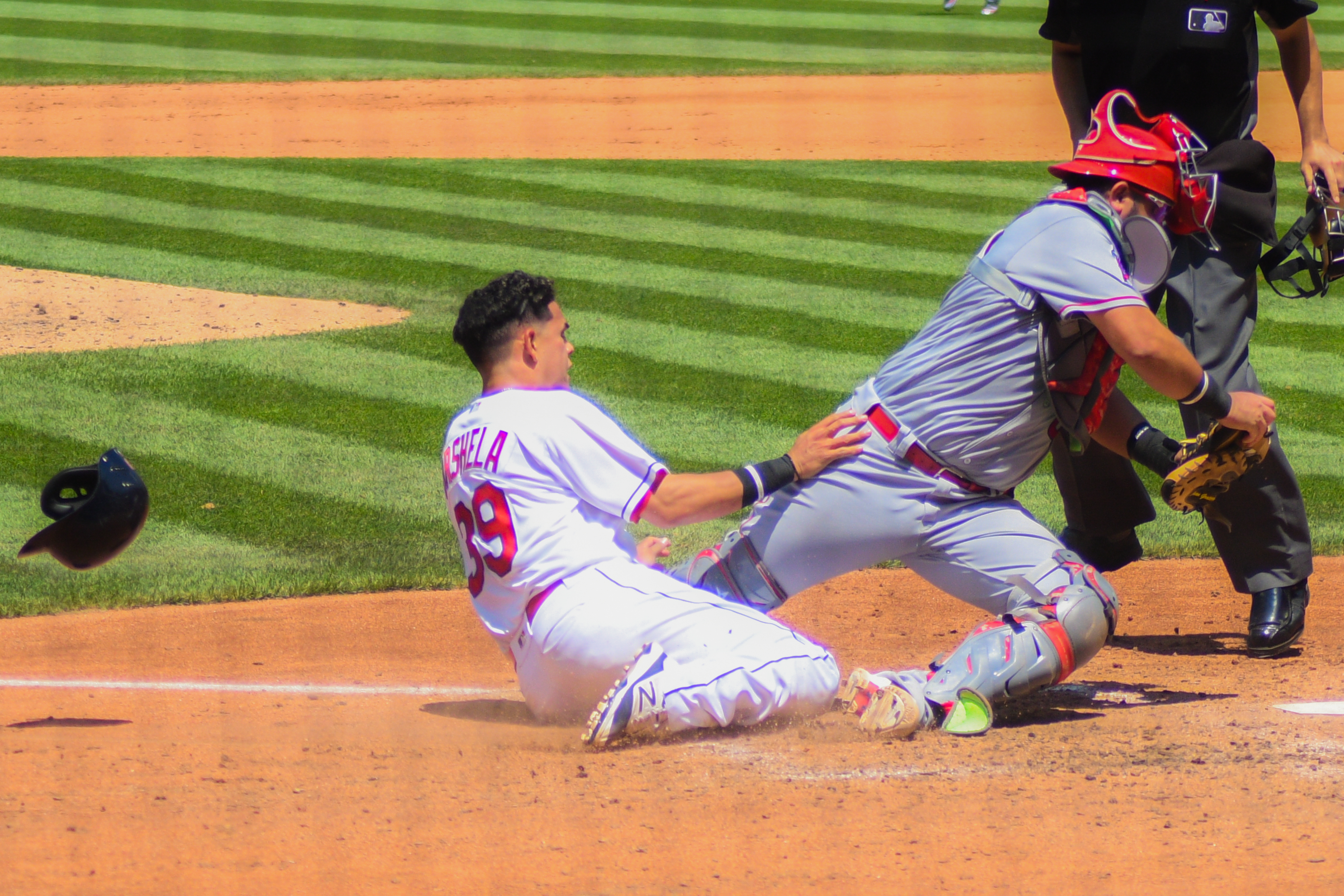
Urshela as a member of the Cleveland Indians

Urshela batted .224 in 67 major league games for Cleveland in 2017. He opened the 2018 season on the disabled list. After completing his rehab assignment in the minors, Urshela was designated for assignment on May 4. He had batted .225 in 453 plate appearances for Cleveland.

=== Toronto Blue Jays ===
On May 9, 2018, Cleveland traded Urshela to the Toronto Blue Jays for cash considerations or a player to be named later. Urshela batted .233 with one home run and three runs batted in (RBIs) in 19 games for Toronto, before he was designated for assignment by the Blue Jays on June 26. He cleared waivers and was assigned outright to the Triple-A Buffalo Bisons on July 3. He batted .244 in 91 plate appearances for the Bisons.

=== New York Yankees ===
On August 4, 2018, the Blue Jays traded Urshela to the New York Yankees in exchange for cash considerations. The Yankees assigned him to the Scranton/Wilkes-Barre RailRiders. He worked with Phil Plantier, the RailRiders' hitting coach, to make changes to his batting stance. Urshela batted .307 in 107 plate appearances for Scranton/Wilkes-Barre.

The Yankees selected Urshela's contract on April 6, 2019, after Miguel Andújar, the Yankees' starting third baseman tore his right shoulder labrum. Urshela began the season hitting 25-for-71 (.352), and continued to play for the Yankees when Andújar returned briefly in May, though Andújar soon opted to have season-ending surgery.

Urshela opened the 2020 season as the Yankees' starting third baseman. He played in 43 of the team's 60 games, missing time with a groin injury in late August. He batted .298/.368/.490 with 6 home runs and 30 RBIs, and led all qualifying third basemen with a .992 fielding percentage. On September 30, in Game 2 of the AL Wild Card Series, Urshela became the first Yankees third baseman to hit a postseason grand slam doing so against his former team, the Cleveland Indians. This also helped the Yankees sweep the Indians in the best-of-three Wild Card Series. The Yankees went on to lose in the Division Series to the Tampa Bay Rays in five games.

=== Minnesota Twins ===
On March 13, 2022, the Yankees traded Urshela and Gary Sánchez to the Minnesota Twins in exchange for Josh Donaldson, Isiah Kiner-Falefa and Ben Rortvedt. In 2022 he batted .285/.338/.429. He was picked off at second base twice, leading the majors.

In October 2022, it was announced that Urshela would spend the 2022 offseason playing with his hometown Tigres de Cartagena of the Colombian Professional Baseball League.

=== Los Angeles Angels ===
On November 18, 2022, Urshela was traded from the Twins to the Los Angeles Angels for minor league pitcher Alejandro Hidalgo. The Angels began the 2023 season with Urshela as their regular shortstop. On June 16, 2023, Urshela was placed on the 10-day injured list due to a left pelvis fracture. On June 21, 2023, the Angels announced Urshela would not need surgery but would miss the remainder of the 2023 season.

=== Detroit Tigers ===
On February 22, 2024, Urshela signed a one-year, $1.5 million contract with the Detroit Tigers. In 92 games for the Tigers, he batted .243/.286/.333 with five home runs and 37 RBIs. On August 16, Urshela was designated for assignment. He was released two days later.

=== Atlanta Braves ===
On August 20, 2024, Urshela signed a one-year, major league contract with the Atlanta Braves. In 36 games for Atlanta, he batted .265/.287/.424 with four home runs and 15 RBI.

=== Athletics ===
On December 19, 2024, Urshela signed a one-year, major league contract with the Athletics. In 59 appearances for the Athletics, he slashed .238/.287/.326 with no home runs and 20 RBI. Urshela was designated for assignment by the team on August 15, 2025. He was released by the team after clearing waivers on August 17.

=== Minnesota Twins (second stint) ===
On February 9, 2026, Urshela signed a minor league contract with the Minnesota Twins. He was released by Minnesota prior to the start of the regular season on March 20.

Urshela announced his retirement from professional baseball on May 18, 2026.

== International career ==
Before the 2013 season, he played for the Colombian national baseball team in the qualifiers for the World Baseball Classic, but the team lost to Panama and failed to qualify for the tournament. He played for the Colombian national baseball team again after they qualified for the 2017 World Baseball Classic. In 14 plate appearances, he slashed .143/.143/.143 with two hits.

Urshela was named to the Colombian roster for the 2026 World Baseball Classic qualifiers, held in March 2025 in Tucson, Arizona.

== Coaching career ==
Shortly after announcing his retirement as a player, Urshela was named manager of the Colombian national team for the 2026 Central American and Caribbean Games.

In September 2026, Urshela was appointed manager of the Colombian national team for the qualification round of the 2027 WBSC Premier12.

== Personal life ==
Urshela is married to his wife, Danna. In 2022, she gave birth to their daughter. Danna is a journalist in Colombia.
