= USS Narragansett (1859) =

Gunboat of the United States Navy

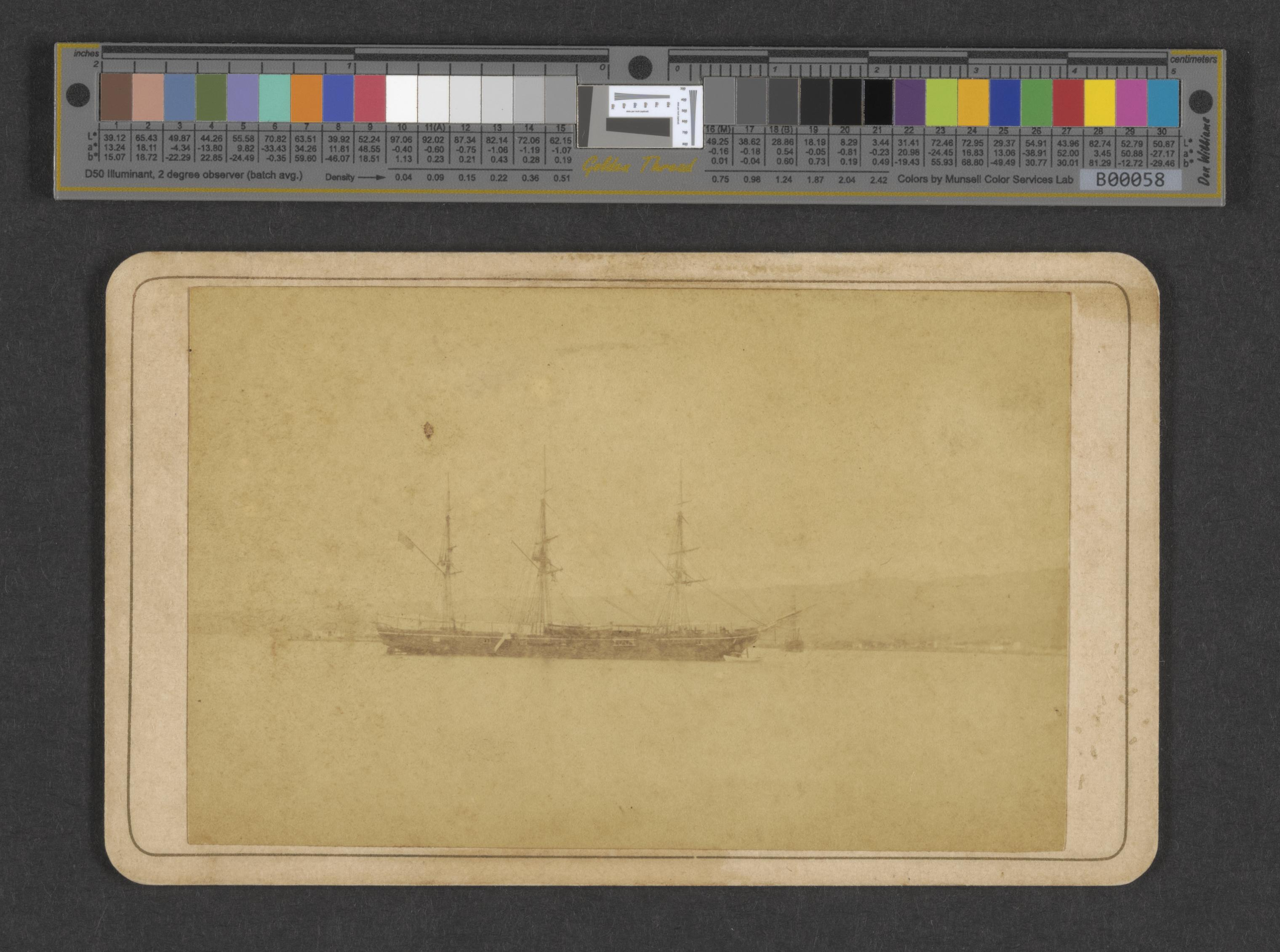

History

United States
- Name: USS Narragansett
- Builder: Boston Navy Yard
- Launched: 15 February 1859
- Commissioned: 6 November 1859
- Decommissioned: 1875
- Fate: Sold, 3 November 1883

General characteristics
- Type: 2nd class Screw sloop
- Displacement: 1,235 long tons (1,255 t)
- Length: 188 ft (57 m)
- Beam: 30 ft 4 in (9.25 m)
- Draft: 11 ft 6 in (3.51 m)
- Speed: 9.5 knots (17.6 km/h; 10.9 mph)
- Complement: 50 officers and enlisted
- Armament: 1 × 11 in (280 mm) gun; 4 × 32-pounder guns

The first USS Narragansett was a 2nd class screw sloop in the United States Navy during the American Civil War. Narragansett was built at the Boston Navy Yard, launched on 15 February 1859, and commissioned on 6 November 1859.

== Service history ==
=== Civil War, 1860–1865 ===
Narragansett operated along the East Coast into the spring of 1860. On 31 March of that year she departed Norfolk, Virginia, for the Pacific, arriving at Valparaíso, Chile, 4 August. Throughout the Civil War she cruised in the Pacific with the primary mission of protecting American mail steamers from Confederate raiders.

On 15 December 1864 she departed the Eastern Pacific for the East Coast, arriving at New York City on 18 March 1865. There she remained in ordinary for several years.

=== Gulf of Mexico, 1869 ===
Back in full service in 1869, she was ordered south, to cruise off the Cuban and Floridian coasts. With the outbreak of yellow fever in the ship in the late spring, Narragansett was ordered to Portsmouth, New Hampshire, where she decommissioned 2 July 1869.

=== Pacific, 1871–1875 ===
Inactive for over two years, she again set sail for the Pacific on 26 March 1871, arriving at San Francisco on 17 September. In December she sailed for the Southwest Pacific and an extended cruise through the Marshalls, Gilberts and Samoan Islands to Australia, arriving at Sydney on 2 April 1873.

On her return from this cruise, the sloop was assigned special duty in connection with the survey and examination of the steamer routes along the coasts of California and Mexico. While she was at Mare Island Naval Shipyard, California, in November 1874, Seaman Thomas Lakin jumped overboard and rescued two shipmates from drowning, for which he was later awarded the Medal of Honor. Detached from that duty in 1875, Narragansett entered the Mare Island Naval Shipyard, where she decommissioned and was laid up until 3 November 1883, when she was sold to Win. E. Mighell of San Francisco.
