= Kenneth Meade Lakin =

American physicist and pioneer of thin-film acoustic resonators

- Born: Kenneth Meade Lakin; January 14, 1941; Grand Rapids, Michigan, U.S.
- Died: November 24, 2012 (aged 71) near Redmond, Oregon, U.S.
- Education: University of Michigan (B.S., M.S.); Stanford University (Ph.D., 1969)
- Known for: Solidly mounted resonator (SMR); Thin-film bulk acoustic resonator (TFBAR)
- Awards: IEEE UFFC Walter G. Cady Award (2003); IEEE Fellow (2004); IEEE UFFC Achievement Award (2010)
- Scientific career
- Fields: Applied physics, electrical engineering, acoustics
- Workplaces: University of Southern California; Ames Laboratory / Iowa State University; TFR Technologies
- Thesis: (1969)

Kenneth Meade Lakin (January 14, 1941 – November 24, 2012) was an American physicist and engineer known for pioneering work on thin-film acoustic resonators. He is widely credited with inventing and developing the solidly mounted resonator (SMR) and advancing the thin-film bulk acoustic resonator (TFBAR) technology used in microwave filters for mobile and wireless communications.

== Biography ==
Lakin was born in Grand Rapids, Michigan, to Mabel (Meade) and Harold Lakin, and grew up in Portland, Michigan. He earned B.S. and M.S. degrees in physics, mathematics, and electrical engineering from the University of Michigan, and a Ph.D. in applied physics from Stanford University in 1969. He died at home near Redmond, Oregon, on November 24, 2012, following an extended illness.

== Career ==
From 1969 to 1980, Lakin was on the faculty of the University of Southern California, conducting research on surface acoustic wave (SAW) devices, thin-film resonators, and piezoelectric film growth and characterization. In 1980 he joined Ames Laboratory/Iowa State University, where he founded the Microelectronics Research Center (MRC) and served there until 1989.

In 1989, Lakin founded TFR Technologies, Inc. in Oregon, serving as president and CEO. Under his leadership the company advanced thin-film resonator devices and filters, and participated in multiple U.S. SBIR programs related to thin-film resonator microwave-acoustic filters. He retired from TFR Technologies in 2005.

== Research and legacy ==
Lakin's work established the practical SMR structure—depositing a piezoelectric thin film on an acoustic Bragg reflector to confine energy and enable high-frequency operation on generic substrates—leading to compact, manufacturable BAW filters for RF front ends. He authored more than 100 technical publications and was granted at least 21 U.S. patents covering resonators, filters, and fabrication methods.

His 2005 review article in IEEE Transactions on Ultrasonics, Ferroelectrics, and Frequency Control summarized thin-film resonator technology and influenced academic and industrial development of BAW filters used in mobile phones and wireless infrastructure.

== Awards and honors ==
Walter G. Cady Award (2003), IEEE Ultrasonics, Ferroelectrics, and Frequency Control Society—for “outstanding and innovative work leading to the development of miniature, thin film resonator filters in commercially viable products.”

IEEE Fellow (effective January 1, 2004), “for contributions to thin-film resonator technology and applications.”

IEEE UFFC Society Achievement Award (2010), recognizing pioneering contributions to AlN-based BAW/SMR devices and filters.

== Selected publications ==
Lakin, K. M. (2005). “Thin film resonator technology.” IEEE Trans. Ultrason., Ferroelectr., Freq. Control 52(5): 707–716. doi:10.1109/TUFFC.2005.1503959.

== Selected patents ==
Lakin, K. M. (1998). “Method and apparatus for fabricating a piezoelectric resonator to a resonant frequency.” U.S. Patent 5,630,949 (assignee: TFR Technologies, Inc.).

Lakin, K. M. (1997). “Method for optimizing piezoelectric resonator-based networks.” U.S. Patent 5,404,628 (assignee: TFR Technologies, Inc.).

== See also ==
- Thin film bulk acoustic resonator
- Bulk acoustic wave
- RF filter
