= Ləkin =

- Municipality
- Location within Azerbaijan
- Coordinates: 39°07′27″N 48°19′16″E
- Country: Azerbaijan
- Rayon: Jalilabad

Population
  - Total: 1,536
- Time zone: UTC+4 (AZT)
  - Summer (DST): UTC+5 (AZT)

Ləkin (also, Lyakin) is a village and municipality in the Jalilabad Rayon of Azerbaijan. It has a population of 1,536.
