= Thomas Lakin =

United States Navy Medal of Honor recipient

- Born: c. 1840; New York, US
- Military career
- Allegiance: United States
- Branch: United States Navy
- Rank: Seaman
- Unit: USS Narragansett
- Awards: Medal of Honor

Thomas Lakin (c. 1840–?) was a United States Navy sailor and a recipient of the United States military's highest decoration, the Medal of Honor.

== Biography ==
Born in about 1840 in New York, Lakin joined the Navy from that state. By November 1874, he was serving as a seaman on the USS Narragansett. During that month, while Narragansett was at the Mare Island Naval Shipyard in California, he jumped overboard and rescued two shipmates from drowning. For this action, he was awarded the Medal of Honor.

Lakin's official Medal of Honor citation reads:

Serving on board the U.S.S. Narragansett at the Navy Yard, Mare Island, Calif., November 1874, jumping overboard, Lakin displayed gallant conduct by rescuing 2 men of that ship from drowning.

== See also ==
- List of Medal of Honor recipients in non-combat incidents
