= Deivi García =

Dominican baseball player (born 1999)

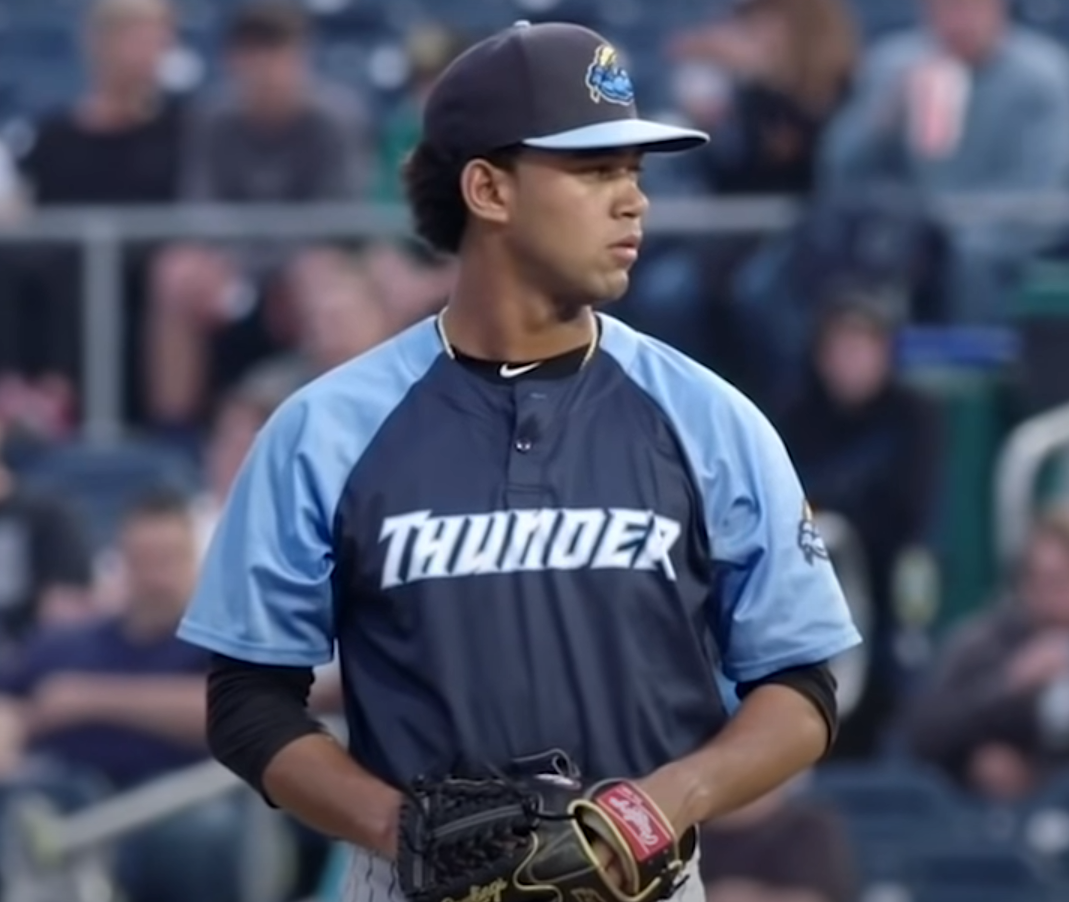
- García with the Trenton Thunder in 2019

Free agent
- Pitcher
- Born: May 19, 1999 (age 27); Bonao, Dominican Republic
- Bats: Right Throws: Right

MLB debut
- August 30, 2020, for the New York Yankees

MLB statistics (through 2024 season)
- Win–loss record: 4–7
- Earned run average: 5.02
- Strikeouts: 65
- Stats at Baseball Reference

Teams
- New York Yankees (2020–2021, 2023); Chicago White Sox (2023–2024)

Deivi Anderson García (born May 19, 1999) is a Dominican professional baseball pitcher who is a free agent. He has previously played in Major League Baseball (MLB) for the New York Yankees and Chicago White Sox.

== Early life ==
García was born and grew up in Bonao, Dominican Republic. He has two older brothers. His father, a youth baseball coach, also coached García as a youngster. His mother, a doctor, set aside her career to raise their family.

== Career ==
=== New York Yankees ===
García signed with the New York Yankees in July 2015 for a $200,000 signing bonus. Though he previously played baseball as an infielder and an outfielder, the Yankees had him become a pitcher due to his throwing arm strength. In 2018, García pitched for the Charleston RiverDogs of the Single–A South Atlantic League and the Tampa Tarpons of the High–A Florida State League. He made his final start of the 2018 season with the Trenton Thunder of the Double–A Eastern League.

García returned to Tampa in 2019, and was promoted to Trenton after making four starts. In July he was selected to play in the All-Star Futures Game. After the game, he was promoted to the Scranton/Wilkes-Barre RailRiders of the Triple–A International League. Following the 2019 season, the Yankees added García to their 40-man roster to protect him from becoming eligible in the Rule 5 draft. García was named minor league pitcher of the year in the Yankees organization in 2019.

The Yankees sent García to their alternate training site to begin the 2020 season. He made his major league debut for the Yankees on August 30. He pitched six innings on 75 pitches, allowing four singles, one unearned run, no walks, and had six strikeouts in a no-decision. He had a 3–2 record with a 4.98 ERA in six starts during the 2020 season. He started Game 2 of the 2020 American League Division Series. as an opener, pitching one inning before being replaced with J. A. Happ.

García spent most of the 2021 season with Scranton/Wilkes-Barre, pitching to a 6.85 ERA in 90 2/3 innings. He was 0–2 with a 6.48 ERA with the Yankees in two major league starts in 2021. He missed time during the 2022 season due to a finger injury, and had a 6.89 ERA for the Somerset Patriots and Scranton/Wilkes-Barre. He did not pitch in the major leagues in 2022.

The Yankees transitioned García into a relief pitcher in 2023. The Yankees promoted him to the major leagues on May 10. He earned his first major league save and was optioned back to Scranton/Wilkes-Barre. After posting a 5.67 ERA in 28 appearances for Scranton, García was designated for assignment on August 7.

=== Chicago White Sox ===
On August 10, 2023, the Chicago White Sox claimed García off of waivers. He made seven appearances for the Charlotte Knights of the International League, allowing two runs in nine innings, before he was promoted to the major leagues on September 11. In six games down the stretch, he logged a 2.89 ERA with 7 strikeouts across 9 1/3 innings.

García began the 2024 season as part of Chicago's bullpen. After struggling to a 7.07 ERA across 14 appearances, he was designated for assignment on April 28, 2024. García cleared waivers and was sent outright to Triple–A Charlotte on May 2. While playing for Charlotte on June 16, García was part of a seven–pitcher no-hitter against the Durham Bulls. In 40 total appearances for Charlotte, he struggled to a 6.18 ERA with 62 strikeouts over 51 innings. García elected free agency following the season on November 4.

=== Milwaukee Brewers ===
On November 18, 2024, García signed a minor league contract with the Milwaukee Brewers. In 10 appearances (six starts) for the Triple-A Nashville Sounds, he logged a 3–2 record and 5.45 ERA with 27 strikeouts over 33 innings of work. García was released by the Brewers organization on June 4, 2025.
