= Miguel Andújar =

Dominican baseball player (born 1995)

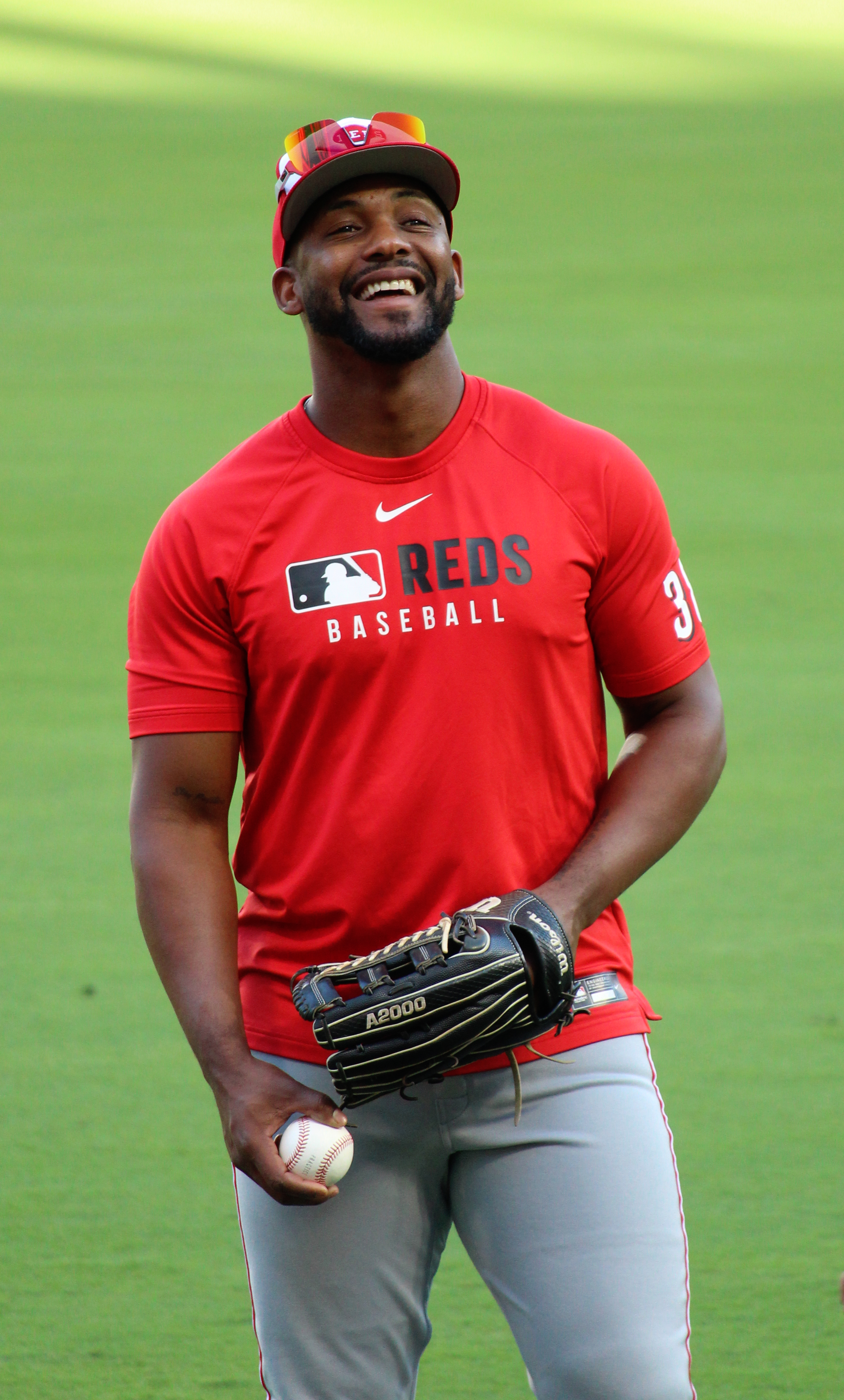
- Andújar with the Reds in 2025

Free agent
- Left fielder / Third baseman
- Born: March 2, 1995 (age 31); San Cristóbal, Dominican Republic
- Bats: Right Throws: Right

MLB debut
- June 28, 2017, for the New York Yankees

MLB statistics (through 2026 season)
- Batting average: .279
- Home runs: 58
- Runs batted in: 245
- Stats at Baseball Reference

Teams
- New York Yankees (2017–2022); Pittsburgh Pirates (2022–2023); Oakland Athletics / Athletics (2024–2025); Cincinnati Reds (2025); San Diego Padres (2026)

Miguel Enrique Andújar (born March 2, 1995) is a Dominican professional baseball left fielder and third baseman who is a free agent. He has previously played in MLB for the New York Yankees, Pittsburgh Pirates, Oakland Athletics / Athletics, Cincinnati Reds, and San Diego Padres.

As a third baseman for the Yankees, Andújar finished second in 2018 American League Rookie of the Year voting behind Shohei Ohtani. He hit 47 doubles, breaking Joe DiMaggio's 1936 record for most by a Yankees rookie. Owing to several injuries, he never played a full season for the Yankees again and was eventually designated for assignment in 2022.

== Early life ==
Andújar was born in San Cristóbal, Dominican Republic.

== Career ==
=== New York Yankees ===
==== Minor leagues ====
Andújar signed with the New York Yankees as an international free agent in July 2011. He made his professional debut in 2012 with the Gulf Coast Yankees. He played the 2013 season for the Gulf Coast Yankees 2 and the 2014 season for the Charleston RiverDogs of the Single-A South Atlantic League. In 2015, Andújar played for the Tampa Yankees of the High-A Florida State League. He started 2016 with Tampa before being promoted to the Trenton Thunder of the Double-A Eastern League. After the 2016 season he played in the Arizona Fall League. The Yankees added him to their 40-man roster after the season. Andújar began the 2017 season with Trenton, and he batted .312 with seven home runs and 52 runs batted in (RBIs), which were leading the Eastern League, through 67 games. Following a season-ending injury to Gleyber Torres in June, he was promoted to the Scranton/Wilkes-Barre RailRiders of the Triple-A International League.

==== Major leagues ====
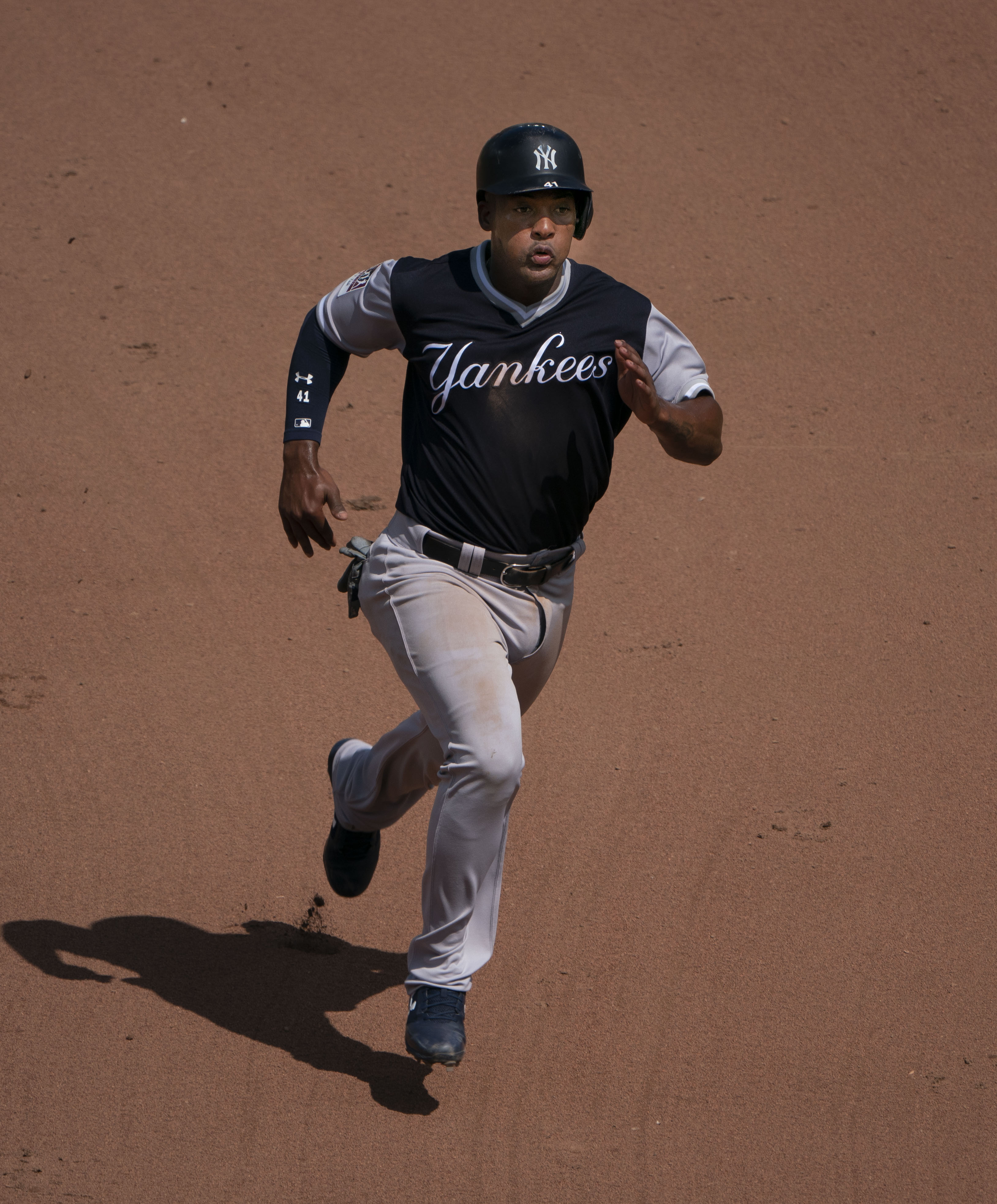
Andújar baserunning in 2018

After playing in seven games with the RailRiders, the Yankees promoted Andújar to the major leagues on June 28, when Matt Holliday, the Yankees designated hitter, went on the disabled list. He made his major league debut as the Yankees' designated hitter that day against the Chicago White Sox, going 3-for-4 with four RBIs and a walk, breaking the Yankees' record for most RBIs in a player's first game. The next day, the Yankees sent him back down to Scranton/Wilkes-Barre, so that he could continue to play every game as a third baseman. Following the conclusion of the RailRiders' season, where Andujar had batted .317 with nine home runs and 30 RBIs in 58 games, the Yankees promoted him to the major leagues on September 16.

Andújar began the 2018 season with Scranton/Wilkes-Barre, but was promoted to the major leagues on April 1 after an injury to Billy McKinney. He hit his first major league home run on April 17. On April 23, Andújar hit a solo home run against the Minnesota Twins, marking his 7th consecutive game with an extra base hit. Andújar joined Joe DiMaggio and Mickey Mantle as the only Yankees to ever have 7 consecutive games with an extra base hit under the age of 24. On May 4, Andujar hit his first career walk-off, an RBI single to secure a 7–6 win over the Cleveland Indians. On June 5, he hit his first major league grand slam. On September 29, Andujar hit his 45th double of the season, breaking the Yankees' record for most doubles by a rookie, previously held by Joe DiMaggio. With the Yankees, he batted .297/.328/.527, and saw the lowest percentage of fastballs of all MLB hitters (46.0%). He finished second in the Rookie of the Year Award balloting, behind Shohei Ohtani.

On April 1, 2019, Andújar went on the 10-day injured list due to a right shoulder strain. He was diagnosed with a partial glenoid labrum tear, but chose to rehabilitate the injury rather than undergo surgery. The Yankees activated him on May 4. He batted 3-for-34 before was placed back on the injured list on May 13. On May 15, Andujar was ruled out for the rest of 2019 after revealing that he needed surgery on his right shoulder. He underwent surgery on May 20.

Andújar made his return in spring training in 2020, where he began playing as a left fielder. He began the season batting 1-for-14 (.071) before the Yankees optioned him to their alternate training site.

Andújar was placed on the injured list in early July 2021 with a strained wrist. After suffering a setback in his rehab, Andújar was transferred to the 60-day injured list on August 23.

On March 22, 2022, Andújar signed a $1.3 million contract with the Yankees, avoiding salary arbitration. He began the year with Scranton/Wilkes-Barre, but was later recalled. On June 4, 2022, Andújar was optioned down to Triple-A Scranton and promptly requested to be traded from the Yankees.

On September 8, Andújar hit his first home run in over 14 months, going 2-for-3 with a walk and two RBIs. On September 22, 2022, Andújar was designated for assignment by the Yankees.

=== Pittsburgh Pirates ===
On September 25, 2022, the Pittsburgh Pirates claimed Andújar off waivers. He played in 9 games for Pittsburgh down the stretch, hitting .250/.275/.389 with no home runs and 9 RBI. The Pirates signed Andújar to a one-year contract worth $1.525 million, avoiding salary arbitration, on November 18.

The Pirates designated Andújar for assignment on January 20, 2023, after the signing of Andrew McCutchen was made official. He cleared waivers and was sent outright to the Triple-A Indianapolis Indians on January 26. In 23 games for Indianapolis, Andújar hit .284/.364/.500 with 3 home runs, 15 RBI, and 2 stolen bases. On April 29, Andújar had his contract selected to the active roster. He played in 13 games for Pittsburgh, but hit just .161/.212/.387 in 33 plate appearances. On May 19, Andújar was designated for assignment after Rob Zastryzny was activated off of the injured list. He cleared waivers and was sent outright to Triple-A on May 22. On September 1, Andújar was selected back to the major league roster. In 30 games for Pittsburgh, he batted .250/.300/.476 with 4 home runs and 18 RBI. Following the season on November 2, Andújar was removed from the 40–man roster and sent outright to Triple–A Indianapolis.

=== Oakland Athletics / Athletics ===
On November 6, 2023, Andújar was claimed off waivers by the Oakland Athletics. He signed a one-year contract worth $1.7 million with the Athletics on November 17. On March 22, 2024, it was announced that Andújar had suffered a torn meniscus and would be out 4–6 weeks following surgery. He ultimately played in 75 games for Oakland, slashing .285/.320/.377 with four home runs, 30 RBI, and three stolen bases. On August 28, manager Mark Kotsay announced that Andújar would undergo season–ending core muscle surgery.

On January 9, 2025, the Athletics and Andújar agreed on a contract worth $3 million to avoid arbitration. He made 60 appearances for the team, slashing .298/.329/.436 with six home runs, 27 RBI, and one stolen base.

=== Cincinnati Reds ===
On July 31, 2025, the Athletics traded Andújar to the Cincinnati Reds in exchange for Kenya Huggins. Andújar made 34 appearances down the stretch for Cincinnati, batting .359/.400/.544 with four home runs and 17 RBI.

=== San Diego Padres ===
On February 11, 2026, Andújar signed a one-year, $1.5 million contract with the San Diego Padres that included a $2.5 million mutual option for the following season. On November 1, he declined his half of a mutual contract option becoming a free agent.

== Personal life ==
In March 2022, Andújar was robbed at gunpoint at his farm in San Cristóbal, Dominican Republic. Andújar was not shot, but he was beaten. A relative, however, was shot in the finger.
