= Travis Lakins Sr. =

American baseball player (born 1994)

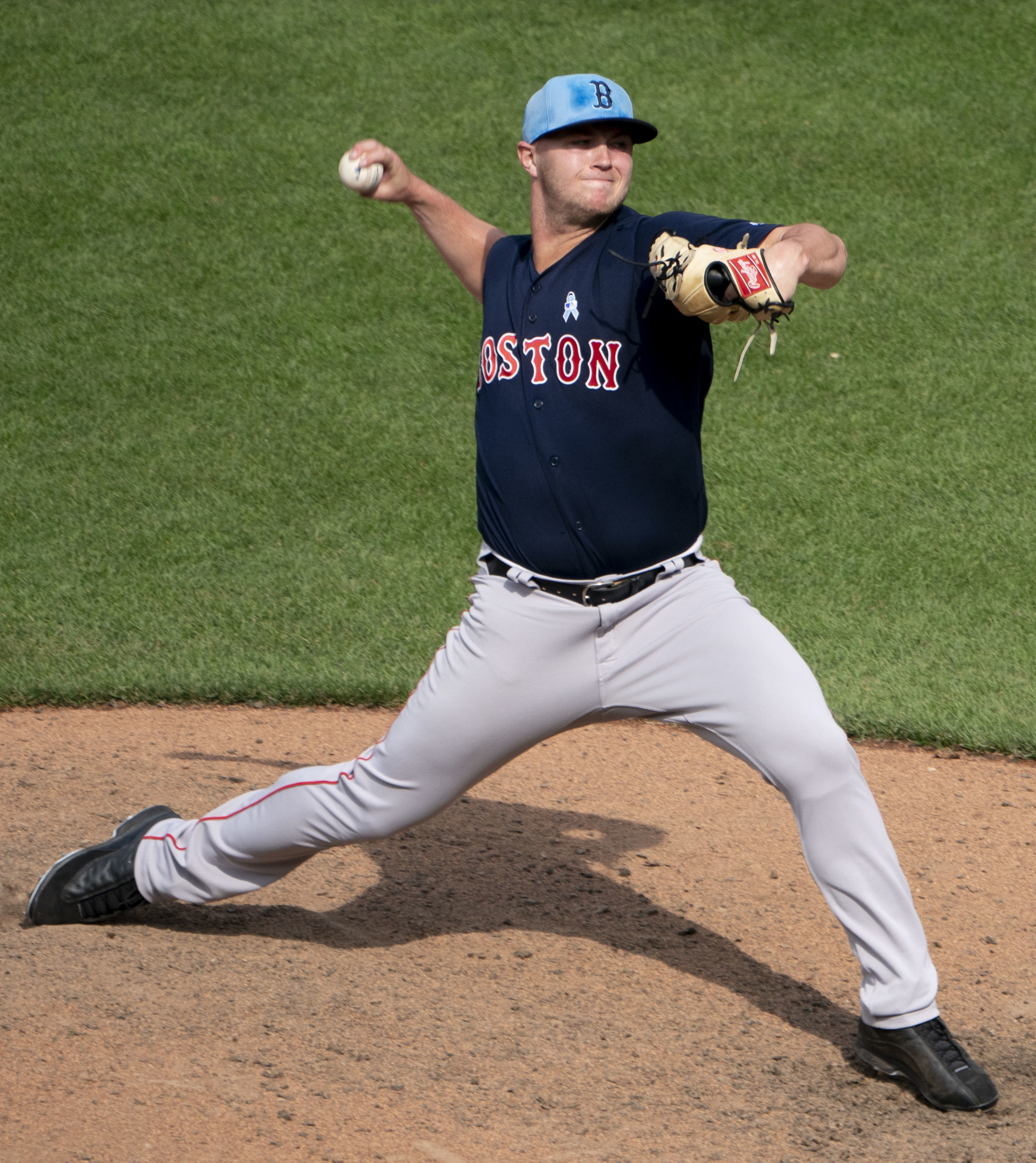
- Lakins with the Red Sox in 2019

Free agent
- Pitcher
- Born: June 29, 1994 (age 32); Franklin, Ohio, U.S.
- Bats: Right Throws: Right

MLB debut
- April 23, 2019, for the Boston Red Sox

MLB statistics (through 2022 season)
- Win–loss record: 4–8
- Earned run average: 4.84
- Strikeouts: 75
- Stats at Baseball Reference

Teams
- Boston Red Sox (2019); Baltimore Orioles (2020–2022)

Travis Clay Lakins Sr. (born June 29, 1994) is an American professional baseball pitcher who is a free agent. He has previously played in Major League Baseball (MLB) for the Boston Red Sox and Baltimore Orioles. Listed at 6 feet 1 inch (1.85 m) and 180 pounds (82 kg), he throws and bats right-handed.

== Career ==
Lakins attended Franklin High School. Lakins played college baseball for the Ohio State Buckeyes, and in 2014, he pitched a perfect game for the Chillicothe Paints, a collegiate summer baseball team.

=== Boston Red Sox ===
The Red Sox selected Lakins in the sixth round of the 2015 MLB draft, signing him for an above-slot bonus of $320,000. Lakins struck out three batters in two shutout innings during his only appearance with the Low–A Lowell Spinners in 2015. He then pitched for the rookie–level Gulf Coast League Red Sox, but only in the playoffs. In his brief stint, Lakins showed a quick arm from a three-quarters arm slot, offering a three-pitch mix with a fastball-curveball-changeup combination, with his fastball sitting at 92–94 mph (148–151 km/h) and topping out at 96 with a bit of sink and run. The curveball flashed plus-potential at 75–76 mph (121–122 km/h) with two-plane, tight rotation and hard snap, while the changeup ranged 83–87 mph (134–140 km/h) and also showed plus potential with late dive away from left-handed hitters when down in the zone. He also used a heavy mix of curveballs and changeups both early and behind in counts, showing consistency with the secondaries pitches and refined command and control overall.

In 2016, Lakins was promoted two levels up to the High–A Salem Red Sox. In the month of April, he led the Salem pitching staff with a 3–1 record and a 2.13 ERA in four starts, striking out 26 and walking 10 in 25 1/3 innings of work. In early August, Lakins was placed on the disabled list with right elbow inflammation and did not pitch for the rest of the season. He went 6–3 in 19 starts and a relief appearance, featuring a 5.93 ERA with 79 strikeouts and 36 walks in 91 innings.

Lakins spent 2017 with both Salem and the Double-A Portland Sea Dogs, posting a combined 5–4 record with a 4.21 ERA in 68 1/3 innings between both teams. He finished the year rated as the Red Sox' No. 13 prospect, according to MLB.com. Lakins started the 2018 season with Double-A Portland. At the end of July, he was promoted to the Triple-A Pawtucket Red Sox. Overall for the 2018 season, Lakins made 36 appearances, compiling a record of 3–2 with an ERA of 2.32 and three saves.

On November 20, 2018, the Red Sox added Lakins to their 40-man roster to protect him from the Rule 5 draft. Lakins opened the 2019 season with Pawtucket, and on April 23, he was added to Boston's major league active roster for the first time. He made his MLB debut that day, pitching 2 2/3 innings against the Detroit Tigers while allowing one run and striking out two. Lakins was optioned to Pawtucket on April 26. He was recalled on May 23 and optioned back on May 29, then recalled on June 12 and optioned back on June 17. Boston next recalled Lakins on August 12, and optioned him back to Pawtucket on August 20. Lakins was recalled to Boston on September 1, when rosters expanded. Overall with the 2019 Red Sox, Lakins appeared in 16 games (three starts), compiling an 0–1 record with 3.86 ERA and 18 strikeouts in 23 1/3 innings.

Lakins was designated for assignment by the Red Sox on January 17, 2020.

=== Baltimore Orioles ===
Lakins was traded on January 21, 2020, to the Chicago Cubs for future considerations. He was claimed off waivers by the Baltimore Orioles on January 31. He was informed of the transaction while on a late-honeymoon cruise with his wife. In 22 appearances for the Orioles in 2020, Lakins pitched to a 2.81 ERA and 25 strikeouts over 25 2/3 innings.

On June 29, 2021, Lakins made his first start of the season, but left in the second inning with an apparent injury. On July 3, he was placed on the 60-day injured list with right elbow pain, although manager Brandon Hyde described the injury as a “significant elbow injury”. On July 6, Lakins underwent season-ending surgery to fix a recurrent olecranon stress fracture in his right elbow. In 24 appearances with the 2021 Orioles prior to his injury, Lakins recorded a 1–4 record and 5.79 ERA. On October 14, Lakins was outrighted off of the 40-man roster.

On April 15, 2022, Lakins' contract was selected by the Orioles. He made 6 appearances for Baltimore, struggling to a 9.58 ERA with 8 strikeouts in 10 1/3 innings pitched. On July 10, Lakins was placed on the 60-day injured list with right elbow inflammation. On August 31, he was activated from the IL and sent outright to the Triple-A Norfolk Tides. In 5 games (2 starts) with the Tides, he posted an 8.68 ERA with 7 strikeouts in 9 1/3 innings of work. He elected free agency following the season on October 6.

=== Lancaster Barnstormers ===
On April 17, 2023, Lakins signed with the Lancaster Barnstormers of the Atlantic League of Professional Baseball. In three games for the Barnstormers, he recorded a 3.00 ERA with 4 strikeouts in 3 innings of work. With Lancaster, Lakins won the Atlantic League championship.

Lakins retired from professional baseball following the 2023 season to pursue a career in business.

=== Chicago White Sox ===
On June 25, 2024, Lakins came out of retirement and signed a minor league contract with the Chicago White Sox. In 24 appearances for the rookie-level Arizona Complex League White Sox and Triple-A Charlotte Knights, accumulating a 1-2 record and 5.72 ERA with 40 strikeouts and 2 saves across 20 1/3 innings pitched. Lakins elected free agency following the season on November 4.

=== Algodoneros de Union Laguna ===
On January 6, 2025, Lakins signed with the Algodoneros de Unión Laguna of the Mexican League. In 18 starts 95.1 innings he went 9-3 with a 4.72 ERA and 75 strikeouts while also throwing one complete game shutout. He became a free agent following the season.

== Personal life ==
Lakins has been married since 2017; he and his wife have a daughter and two sons.
