= 2017 Washington Nationals season =

2017 Washington Nationals
- National League East champions
- League: National League
- Division: East
- Ballpark: Nationals Park
- City: Washington, D.C.
- Record: 97–65 (.599)
- Divisional place: 1st
- Owners: Lerner Enterprises
- General managers: Mike Rizzo
- Managers: Dusty Baker
- Television: MASN; WUSA 9 (CBS affiliate) (Bob Carpenter, FP Santangelo, Johnny Holliday, Ray Knight)
- Radio: 106.7 The Fan; Washington Nationals Radio Network (Charlie Slowes, Dave Jageler)

The 2017 Washington Nationals season was the Nationals' 13th season as the baseball franchise of Major League Baseball in the District of Columbia, the 10th season at Nationals Park, and the 49th since the original team was started in Montreal, Quebec, Canada. They won the National League East title for the fourth time in six years but were defeated by the Chicago Cubs in the NLDS. As of 2025, this represents the most recent NL East title for the Nationals.

== Offseason ==
=== Team news ===
The Washington Nationals announced in October 2016 that their entire coaching staff would return for the 2017 season, led by manager Dusty Baker.

The team lost several players to free agency after the 2016 season, including right-handed relief pitcher Matt Belisle, left-handed reliever Sean Burnett, infielder Stephen Drew, outfielder Chris Heisey, right-handed pitcher Mat Latos, closer Mark Melancon, catcher Wilson Ramos, and left-handed reliever Marc Rzepczynski. Additionally, the Nationals chose not to exercise their 2017 option on right-handed pitcher Yusmeiro Petit, who also became a free agent, and injured right-handed reliever Aaron Barrett declined an outright assignment to the minors and elected free agency as well. The team did not extend a qualifying offer to any of its free agents. Ramos was considered a likely candidate for a qualifying offer, but due to an injury late in the 2016 season expected to sideline him for part of the 2017 season, he did not receive one; he ultimately signed a two-year deal with the Tampa Bay Rays. Outfielder Ben Revere was eligible for arbitration, but after an injury-plagued and offensively dismal season, he was not tendered a new contract and became a free agent; he later signed a one-year deal with the Los Angeles Angels of Anaheim for less than he was due to earn through the arbitration process. The Nationals extended one-year contracts for the 2017 season to all of their other arbitration-eligible players: shortstop Danny Espinosa (who ended up being traded before arbitration to the Los Angeles Angels of Anaheim), right fielder Bryce Harper, catcher Jose Lobaton, third baseman Anthony Rendon, and right-handed pitcher Tanner Roark. Heisey and Drew both signed new one-year contracts with the Nationals as well.

At various times during the off-season, the Nationals were linked in trade talks to the Chicago White Sox for left-handed starting pitcher Chris Sale (ultimately traded to the Boston Red Sox) and right-handed reliever David Robertson, the Pittsburgh Pirates for center fielder Andrew McCutchen, the Tampa Bay Rays for left-handed reliever Álex Colomé, and the Minnesota Twins for second baseman Brian Dozier, among other players. The Nationals also reportedly made an attempt to re-sign Melancon, who instead signed with the San Francisco Giants, and to sign right-handed reliever Kenley Jansen, a free agent who ended up returning to the Los Angeles Dodgers. They also were reported to have interest in other free agents, including right-handed pitchers Tyson Ross (ultimately signed by the Texas Rangers), Greg Holland (ultimately signed by the Colorado Rockies), and Sergio Romo (ultimately signed by the Dodgers).

The Nationals made one major trade during the off-season, dealing top pitching prospects Lucas Giolito and Reynaldo López and 2016 first-round draft pick Dane Dunning to the White Sox for Adam Eaton, an outfielder with team control through the 2021 season. The Washington Post reported after the trade that the Nationals had become pessimistic after observing Giolito in 2016, including his first major league appearances, that the consensus top right-handed pitching prospect in baseball would end up developing as they had originally expected. In trading Espinosa, who was reportedly unhappy about Eaton's acquisition as it was expected to mean center fielder Trea Turner would become the 2017 starting shortstop, the Nationals acquired pitching prospects Austin L. Adams and Kyle McGowin from the Angels. Two other minor trades during the off-season sent lower-ranked prospects to the San Diego Padres and Tampa Bay Rays for catcher and former Nationals top prospect Derek Norris and left-handed relief pitcher Enny Romero, respectively. Norris was ultimately released during spring training after the Nationals signed catcher Matt Wieters out of free agency.

=== Transactions ===
- November 19, 2016: The Nationals signed outfielder Chris Heisey to a one-year major league deal.
- November 20, 2016: The Nationals signed right-handed pitcher Derek Eitel, infielder Corban Joseph, left-handed pitcher Braulio Lara, and infielder/outfielder Brandon Snyder to minor league deals with invitations to spring training.
- November 21, 2016: The Nationals signed right-handed pitcher Dustin Antolin to a minor league deal with an invitation to spring training.
- November 23, 2016: The Nationals acquired right-handed pitcher Jimmy Cordero from the Philadelphia Phillies for minor league pitcher Mario Sanchez.
- December 2, 2016: The Nationals acquired catcher Derek Norris from the San Diego Padres for minor league pitcher Pedro Avila.
- December 7, 2016: The Nationals acquired outfielder Adam Eaton from the Chicago White Sox for right-handed pitchers Lucas Giolito and Reynaldo Lopez and minor league pitcher Dane Dunning.
- December 10, 2016: The Nationals acquired right-handed pitcher Austin L. Adams and minor league pitcher Kyle McGowin from the Los Angeles Angels of Anaheim for shortstop Danny Espinosa.
- December 13, 2016: The Nationals signed infielder Emmanuel Burriss, right-handed pitchers Mike Broadway and Jacob Turner, and left-handed pitcher Tim Collins to minor league deals with invitations to spring training.
- January 26, 2017: The Nationals signed infielder Stephen Drew to a one-year major league deal.
- January 27, 2017: The Nationals signed infielder Grant Green to a minor league deal with an invitation to spring training.
- January 28, 2017: The Nationals signed right-handed pitcher Vance Worley to a minor league deal with an invitation to spring training.
- January 31, 2017: The Nationals signed right-handed pitchers Matt Albers and Joe Nathan to minor league deals with invitations to spring training.
- February 3, 2017: The Nationals signed right-handed pitcher Jeremy Guthrie to a minor league deal with an invitation to spring training.
- February 7, 2017: The Nationals acquired left-handed pitcher Enny Romero from the Tampa Bay Rays for minor league pitcher Jeffrey Rosa.
- February 15, 2017: The Nationals signed first baseman Adam Lind to a one-year major league deal.
- February 24, 2017: The Nationals signed catcher Matt Wieters to a two-year major league deal.
- March 2, 2017: The Nationals signed right-handed pitcher Joe Blanton to a one-year major league deal; catcher Spencer Kieboom was designated for assignment and sent outright to the minor leagues to clear space on the roster.
- March 15, 2017: The Nationals released catcher Derek Norris from a major league deal.
- March 27, 2017: The Nationals released right-handed pitchers Matt Albers and Joe Nathan from minor league deals.
- March 29, 2017: The Nationals released right-handed pitcher Vance Worley from a minor league deal.
- March 30, 2017: The Nationals signed right-handed pitcher Matt Albers to a new minor league deal.
- March 31, 2017: The Nationals sent first baseman Clint Robinson outright to the minor leagues.

=== Spring training ===
For 2017, the Nationals moved to a new spring training facility at The Ballpark of the Palm Beaches, in West Palm Beach, Florida, which they share with the Houston Astros. Projected to cost US$135 million, the construction of the ballpark and training facilities actually cost US$150 million. The new facility provided each team with two major-league-size practice fields, four-minor-league-size practice fields, an agility field, a half field, batting cages, and pitching mounds, and centered around a new baseball stadium with 6,400 ticketed seats and 1,250 berm seats. The move from their former spring training home, Space Coast Stadium in Viera, Florida, placed the Nationals far closer to other teams during spring training, facilitating travel for spring training games.

Construction of the new facility was rushed so that it could be completed in 16 months. Nationals pitchers and catchers officially reported for spring training at the new facility on February 14, followed by the rest of the players on February 17. Construction was not yet complete, but the Nationals were able to prioritize the parts of the facilities most important to spring training so that it met their needs by the reporting dates.

Washington began its schedule of spring training games on February 25 with three straight road games. With construction crews still putting the finishing touches on the stadium during the morning, the Nationals and Astros opened the Ballpark of the Palm Beaches with their first game there on February 28, with the Nationals playing as the home team at the shared facility. Commissioner of Baseball Rob Manfred cut a ceremonial ribbon, and a helicopter flyover took place during the opening ceremonies. Before a crowd of 5,897, Nationals non-roster invitee Jeremy Guthrie threw the first pitch at 1:07 p.m. EST, to Astros first baseman Marwin González, whom he eventually struck out. In the bottom of the first inning, second baseman Daniel Murphy doubled for the first hit in the ballpark's history, and a few minutes later scored its first run when right fielder Bryce Harper doubled to drive him home. In the top of the fourth inning, Astros designated hitter Carlos Beltrán hit the stadium's first home run, and catcher Derek Norris hit the first Nationals home run in the park's history in the bottom of the fourth. With two outs in the bottom of the ninth, outfielder Michael A. Taylor hit a walk-off solo home run to give the Nationals a 4–3 victory in their first game at their new spring training home.

The facility's name changed the following season, becoming FITTEAM Ballpark of the Palm Beaches after the Astros and Nationals signed a 12-year deal for the naming rights to the stadium on February 16, 2018, with FITTEAM, an event brand partnership and organic products firm in Palm Beach Gardens, Florida.

==== World Baseball Classic ====
Eight Nationals, including five participants in major league camp, were granted leave from spring training to participate in the 2017 World Baseball Classic (WBC). Starting pitcher Tanner Roark and second baseman Daniel Murphy played for Team USA, reliever Enny Romero played for Team Dominican Republic (eliminated in the second round), reliever Óliver Pérez played for Team Mexico (eliminated in the first round), minor league catcher Nick Rickles and minor league reliever R.C. Orlan played for Team Israel (eliminated in the first round), and minor league catcher Jhonatan Solano and minor league infielder Adrián Sánchez played for Team Colombia (eliminated in the first round). Reliever Rafael Martin was slated to be available for Mexico if they reached the second round, but due to a controversial scoring decision, the team failed to do so. Catcher Spencer Kieboom was listed on the preliminary roster for Team Netherlands but was left off the final announced roster. Starting pitcher Max Scherzer was originally expected to play for the United States, but he withdrew after announcing a stress fracture in the ring finger of his right hand in January.

The United States won the tournament, with Roark turning in a strong four-inning start in the semi-final against Japan. Murphy received only two starts and six at-bats during the tournament, frustrating Nationals manager Dusty Baker, who said he thought it was "hurting" both his players to spend most of their time during the WBC on the bench. Of Murphy, he said, "How are you going to get your stuff together when you're not playing?"

Roark had not planned to stay for the entire tournament, but he elected to stay on the roster in order to make a promised start in the championship round. He told The Washington Post, "Fortunately, it was all three rounds to win the gold, which is amazing to be a part of." Murphy said he spent his time on the team drilling and talking with USA teammates Ian Kinsler and Paul Goldschmidt about fielding and hitting.

== Regular season ==
=== Opening Day ===
==== Opening Day lineup ====
Opening Day Starters
Name	Position
Trea Turner	Shortstop
Adam Eaton	Center field
Bryce Harper	Right field
Daniel Murphy	Second base
Ryan Zimmerman	First base
Jayson Werth	Left field
Stephen Drew	Third base
Matt Wieters	Catcher
Stephen Strasburg	Pitcher

The Nationals began their 2017 season at home against the division rival Miami Marlins. Marlins starter Edinson Vólquez pitched effectively, making heavy use of his changeup to bamboozle Nationals hitters and working out of jams in the first and fourth innings. He gave up four hits and a walk and allowed no runs while striking out six, but he left the game after five innings. Stephen Strasburg was efficient as the Opening Day starter for the Nationals, but the Marlins took the lead in the top of the fourth inning, with right fielder Giancarlo Stanton driving in catcher J. T. Realmuto with a double and then scoring on a single by Marcell Ozuna. The lead was cut in half as Nationals right fielder Bryce Harper hit his fifth career Opening Day home run to right field off Marlins reliever David Phelps in the sixth inning with no one on base, and then Phelps gave up the lead entirely in the bottom of the seventh inning, as pinch-hitter Adam Lind homered to center field after a two-out single by catcher Matt Wieters—both players new additions to the Nationals who signed late in the off-season, with Lind making his first plate appearance with Washington.

Nationals second baseman Daniel Murphy made the score 4–2 with an RBI single in the eighth off Marlins reliever Junichi Tazawa, in Tazawa's first appearance for Miami, but another new Marlin, submariner Brad Ziegler, worked out of a bases-loaded, no-outs jam without letting in another run, striking out left fielder Jayson Werth and inducing third baseman Stephen Drew to ground into a double play, Drew's second of the game. Blake Treinen, named the Nationals' new closer two days before Opening Day, came on for a save situation in the top of the ninth inning and retired the Marlins in order on a popout and two strikeouts, earning his second career save. Strasburg collected the win and Phelps was collared with the loss.

Two players who had originally been expected to make their season debuts on Opening Day for the Nationals sat out the game: starting pitcher Max Scherzer, who had pitched on Opening Day for Washington in 2015 and 2016, was moved back in the rotation after getting a late start to spring training due to a fractured knuckle, and regular third baseman Anthony Rendon was held out with a calf contusion he suffered during the last week of spring training.

=== Season standings ===
==== National League East ====
NL East
Team	W	L	Pct.	GB	Home	Road
Washington Nationals	97	65	.599	—	47‍–‍34	50‍–‍31
Miami Marlins	77	85	.475	20	42‍–‍36	35‍–‍49
Atlanta Braves	72	90	.444	25	37‍–‍44	35‍–‍46
New York Mets	70	92	.432	27	37‍–‍44	33‍–‍48
Philadelphia Phillies	66	96	.407	31	39‍–‍42	27‍–‍54

==== National League Wild Card ====
Division leaders
Team	W	L	Pct.
Los Angeles Dodgers	104	58	.642
Washington Nationals	97	65	.599
Chicago Cubs	92	70	.568

Wild Card teams (Top 2 teams qualify for postseason)
Team	W	L	Pct.	GB
Arizona Diamondbacks	93	69	.574	+6
Colorado Rockies	87	75	.537	—
Milwaukee Brewers	86	76	.531	1
St. Louis Cardinals	83	79	.512	4
Miami Marlins	77	85	.475	10
Pittsburgh Pirates	75	87	.463	12
Atlanta Braves	72	90	.444	15
San Diego Padres	71	91	.438	16
New York Mets	70	92	.432	17
Cincinnati Reds	68	94	.420	19
Philadelphia Phillies	66	96	.407	21
San Francisco Giants	64	98	.395	23

=== Record vs. opponents ===
2017 National League record Source: MLB Standings Grid – 2017
Team	AZ	ATL	CHC	CIN	COL	LAD	MIA	MIL	NYM	PHI	PIT	SD	SF	STL	WSH	AL
Arizona	—	2–4	3–3	3–3	11–8	11–8	3–4	4–3	6–1	6–1	4–3	11–8	12–7	3–4	2–4	12–8
Atlanta	4–2	—	1–6	3–3	3–4	3–4	11–8	4–2	7–12	6–13	2–5	5–2	4–3	1–5	9–10	9–11
Chicago	3–3	6–1	—	12–7	2–5	2–4	4–3	10–9	4–2	4–3	10–9	2–4	4–3	14–5	3–4	12–8
Cincinnati	3–3	3–3	7–12	—	3–4	0–6	2–5	8–11	3–4	4–2	13–6	3–4	4–3	9–10	1–6	5–15
Colorado	8–11	4–3	5–2	4–3	—	10–9	2–4	4–3	3–3	5–2	3–3	12–7	12–7	2–4	3–4	10–10
Los Angeles	8–11	4–3	4–2	6–0	9–10	—	6–1	3–3	7–0	4–3	6–1	13–6	11–8	4–3	3–3	16–4
Miami	4–3	8–11	3–4	5–2	4–2	1–6	—	2–4	12–7	8–11	3–4	5–1	5–1	2–5	6–13	9–11
Milwaukee	3–4	2–4	9–10	11–8	3–4	3–3	4–2	—	5–2	3–3	9–10	5–2	3–4	11–8	4–3	11–9
New York	1–6	12–7	2–4	4–3	3–3	0–7	7–12	2–5	—	12–7	3–3	3–4	5–1	3–4	6–13	7–13
Philadelphia	1–6	13–6	3–4	2–4	2–5	3–4	11–8	3–3	7–12	—	2–5	1–5	4–3	1–5	8–11	5–15
Pittsburgh	3–4	5–2	9–10	6–13	3–3	1–6	4–3	10–9	3–3	5–2	—	3–3	1–5	8–11	4–3	10–10
San Diego	8–11	2–5	4–2	4–3	7–12	6–13	1–5	2–5	4–3	5–1	3–3	—	12–7	3–4	2–5	8–12
San Francisco	7–12	3–4	3–4	3–4	7–12	8–11	1–5	4–3	1–5	3–4	5–1	7–12	—	3–4	1–5	8–12
St. Louis	4–3	5–1	5–14	10–9	4–2	3–4	5–2	8–11	4–3	5–1	11–8	4–3	4–3	—	3–3	8–12
Washington	4–2	10–9	4–3	6–1	4–3	3–3	13–6	3–4	13–6	11–8	3–4	5–2	5–1	3–3	—	10–10

=== April ===
The Nationals started their season by taking two out of three in a series at home against the Miami Marlins, a division rival in the National League East. The team began their 2017 campaign with an unusual roster configuration of 14 position players and 11 pitchers, but they reverted to a more typical 13-and-12 split by purchasing the contract of right-handed pitcher Jeremy Guthrie for a start on April 8 at Citizens Bank Park against the rival Philadelphia Phillies and optioning outfielder Michael A. Taylor to Class-AAA Syracuse of the International League. After Guthrie gave up 10 earned runs and got just two outs — statistically the worst start in Montreal–Washington franchise history, and only the fourth time in the past 100 years a pitcher had allowed double-digit earned runs without recording at least three outs — en route to a 17–3 loss, the spot starter was designated for assignment the next morning, and the Nationals selected the contract of minor league reliever Matt Albers.

Both the Nationals' starting shortstop, Trea Turner, and his primary backup, Stephen Drew, were placed on the 10-day disabled list with strained hamstrings within days of one another. The team recalled Taylor on April 10 and purchased the contract of utility infielder Grant Green on April 12, making Green the third non-roster invitee to the Nationals' spring training in West Palm Beach (after Guthrie, who was removed from the roster after less than 24 hours, and Albers) added to the roster during the month. Turner was activated on April 21 for a game against the division rival New York Mets, and Green was designated for assignment; in his return, as a pinch-hitter, Turner had the game-winning RBI in a 4–3 victory when he took a bases-loaded walk in the 11th inning. On the pitching side of the ledger, left-handed reliever Sammy Solis was placed on the disabled list with elbow inflammation on April 19, and the Nationals called up Joe Ross to start against the division rival Atlanta Braves; Washington won that game 14–4 on the back of two grand slams, struck by right fielder Bryce Harper and first baseman Ryan Zimmerman, in a 20-hit effort and Ross earned the win.

The struggles of newly minted closer Blake Treinen in the ninth inning prompted manager Dusty Baker to announce on April 19 that closing duties would be shared between relievers Shawn Kelley and Koda Glover. Baker said concerns about Kelley's resiliency, due to a twice-repaired elbow, (Note: Shawn Kelley previously underwent Tommy John surgery as a college pitcher at Austin Peay State University in 2003 and while in the Seattle Mariners organization in 2010. (See Waldstein, David, "Rare 2nd Operation Saved Yankee Pitcher's Career," The New York Times, August 31, 2013.)) and Glover's lack of experience, as a rookie without a career save, kept the team from giving either one the sole job of closer. Glover earned his first career save on April 22, coming into the ninth inning with two outs and retiring the only batter he faced. However, he landed on the disabled list with a left hip impingement on April 26, and left-handed reliever Matt Grace was recalled.

The Nationals placed starter Stephen Strasburg on the paternity list on April 24, with the right-hander anticipating the birth of his second child, and made Jacob Turner the fourth spring training non-roster invitee (after Guthrie, Albers, and Green) to crack the team's active roster in the month of April. Turner, a right-handed pitcher whose contract was selected from Class-AAA Syracuse, was given the opportunity to start against the Colorado Rockies in the first of a four-game set at Coors Field. Although Turner supplied a quality start, giving up three earned runs over six innings, and left the game with a lead, the Rockies scored five unanswered runs off the Nationals' bullpen for an 8–4 finish. The game ended up being the only one the Nationals lost on their 10-game roadtrip, with their 9–1 run through series visiting the Braves, Mets, and Rockies standing as the best such mark in team history. On April 25, Trea Turner hit for the cycle for the first time in his career, cracking a two-run home run off Rockies reliever Jordan Lyles in the sixth inning and rounding out his four-hit night with a bases-clearing triple in the seventh inning as the Nationals won a high-scoring 15–12 contest. In an emphatic finish to the trip, on April 27, the Nationals defeated the Rockies 16–5, with the winning margin of 11 runs being supplied entirely in the seventh inning — the most runs the Montreal–Washington franchise had scored in an inning in almost 20 years. (Note: The Montreal Expos set the all-time franchise record in their 1997 season on May 7, when they scored 13 runs against the San Francisco Giants in the sixth inning en route to a 19–3 win. (See Etkin, Jack, "Washington Nationals use 11-run inning to rout Colorado Rockies," UPI, April 27, 2017.)) Strasburg was also reactivated on April 27 and Grace was optioned back to Class-AAA Syracuse, with Jacob Turner reassigned to the bullpen after his spot start.

The team suffered a serious blow when center fielder Adam Eaton, acquired in the off-season in a trade with the Chicago White Sox, stepped awkwardly on first base beating out an infield single in the ninth inning at Nationals Park against the Mets on April 28. Eaton had to be carried off the field, and an MRI showed he had torn his anterior cruciate ligament and knee meniscus and sprained his ankle. The injuries were expected to rule him out for the season, although Eaton said he would work as hard as he could to return in time for the playoffs. The Nationals called up outfielder Rafael Bautista to replace Eaton on the active roster.

Despite losing Eaton and dropping the first two games of the three-game series against the Mets, the Nationals capped the month with a historic performance against their New York rivals on April 30, scoring in every inning but the second and winning 23–5 — the first time an MLB team had scored 23 or more runs in a game in nearly 10 years (Note: The most recent time a team had scored at least 23 runs in a game was August 22, 2007, when the Texas Rangers notched a record-setting 30–3 win over the Baltimore Orioles. (See "The unlikeliest amazing day of all time? Anthony Rendon delivers," ESPN, April 30, 2017.) The 23 runs were also the second-highest total the Mets had ever given up in a game, exceeded only by 26 runs the Philadelphia Phillies scored against them on June 11, 1985. (See Castillo, Jorge, "Anthony Rendon's historic day and the Nationals’ historic month by the numbers," washingtonpost.com, April 30, 2017.)) — and benefiting from a stellar performance from third baseman Anthony Rendon. Rendon had never had more than four RBIs in a game before, and during his 95 plate appearances of the season prior to April 30 had not a hit a home run and had driven in only five runs, but on April 30 he set a Montreal-Washington franchise record for runs batted in in a single game with 10, (Note: The previous Montreal-Washington franchise record was set by Josh Willingham, with eight runs batted in for the Washington Nationals on July 27, 2009, against the Milwaukee Brewers on two grand slam home runs. (See Ladson, Bill, "Two slams from Willingham vault Nats," MLB.com, July 28, 2009.)) (Note: Rendon′s 10 RBIs on April 30 were the most in a single MLB game since August 21, 2007, when Garret Anderson of the Los Angeles Angels of Anaheim drove in 10 runs against the New York Yankees. (See Monagan, Matt, "Here's how Anthony Rendon's 10-RBI game stacks up in history," mlb.com, April 30, 2017.)) hitting three home runs and a three-run double while going 6-for-6 and scoring five runs. (Note: Anthony Rendon's 6-for-6 performance with 10 RBIs made him just the second player in major league history to record a hit in every at-bat while batting in a double-digit number of runs. The feat was first accomplished by Jim Bottomley of the St. Louis Cardinals in their 1924 season, when he went 6-for-6 with 12 RBIs against the Brooklyn Robins on September 16 in a 17–3 win, setting the major league record for RBIs in a game. (See Schuster, Blake, "Anthony Rendon's 10 RBIs didn't even account for half of the Nationals total on Sunday," Yahoo! Sports, April 30, 2017.)) Rendon became one of only six Major League Baseball players to go 6-for-6 and hit three home runs in a game, only the second player in history to do it while also driving in at least 10 runs, (Note: The only other player to go 6-for-6 and hit three home runs and drive in 10 runs in a single game was Walker Cooper for the 1949 Cincinnati Reds. (See Castillo, Jorge, "Anthony Rendon's historic day and the Nationals’ historic month by the numbers," Washington Post, April 30, 2017.)) and only the 13th player in history with at least 10 RBIs in a game. He also became only the fifth Nationals player to hit three home runs in agame, joining Adam Dunn, Bryce Harper, Alfonso Soriano, and Ryan Zimmerman. Bautista also made his major league debut in the game, batting twice against Kevin Plawecki, a catcher making his first-ever major league appearance as a pitcher, and going 0-for-2. Plawecki pitched two innings for the Mets, retiring the side in order in the seventh inning before giving up four runs in the eighth inning, allowing solo home runs by Harper and Rendon and a two-run pinch-hit home run by Adam Lind. The game's 23 runs and seven home runs were both Nationals records, and the Nationals tied the single-game club record for hits with 23. (Coincidentally, on the same day as the Nationals' 23–5 win, the team's Class-A Full Season affiliate, the Hagerstown Suns, also won by 18 runs as they defeated the Lexington Legends 22–4. Like Rendon for Washington, top Nationals infield prospect Carter Kieboom hit three home runs for Hagerstown in that game. The Suns set a South Atlantic League record with 30 hits in the game.)

Overcoming their injuries, the Nationals wrapped up April with a 17–8 record, the best in the major leagues, and finished the month five games ahead of both the Marlins and the Phillies in the National League East. The Nationals became the first team in MLB history to score at least 14 runs in a game five times in April. They scored 170 runs, a club record for a calendar month and 31 more runs than the next-best team, the Arizona Diamondbacks, even though the Diamondbacks played one more game. The Nationals averaged an MLB-high 6.8 runs per game during April, 1.2 runs per game better than any other team. The team finished the month leading MLB in hits (265), walks (102), on-base percentage (.369), slugging percentage (.510), and doubles (58) and was second in MLB in home runs with 45.

In his 90 plate appearances during April, Zimmerman set a new Nationals record for runs batted in during a month with 29, and he finished April leading the MLB in several categories. (Note: Ryan Zimmerman led the major leagues in hits (with 37), extra-base hits (with 19), batting average (at .420), slugging percentage (at .886), on-base-plus-slugging percentage (at 1.345), weighted runs created plus (wRC+) at 244, and RBIs (with 29) and tied for the MLB lead in home runs (with 11). Additionally, he tied for second in MLB for multi-hit games (with 12), and ranked sixth in the major leagues in on-base percentage at .458. (See also Kramer, Daniel, "Big April nets Zimmerman NL monthly honor," mlb.com, May 3, 2017 and Castillo, Jorge, "Ryan Zimmerman named National League player of the month," washingtonpost.com, May 3, 2017.)) Zimmerman was announced on May 1 as National League player of the week for the last week of April, during which he played and hit safely in all six games, had two or more hits in four of them, and drove in more than one run in five games. During the week, he batted .500 (13-for-26), and had two doubles, five home runs, and 13 RBIs and scored 11 runs. He hit safely in each of them, had at least two hits in four, and drove in multiple runs in five. It was his fourth National League player of the week award and first since July 2012. On May 3, he was named National League Player of the Month for April, the first time he had received the award. It was the seventh time a Nationals player had won the award, and the fourth time a National had received the award in the last seven times it had been awarded. Meanwhile, Harper set an MLB record for the most runs scored in April with 32. (Note: Baer, Bill (April 30, 2017). "Bryce Harper sets April record for runs scored". NBC Sports. Archived from the original on May 2, 2017. The previous record was set by Larry Walker of the Colorado Rockies, who scored 29 runs in April 1997.) He finished the month leading the MLB in on-base percentage at .509.

Despite the team's winning ways in April, the bullpen was a source of problems all month, with its combined 5.70 ERA ranking as the highest in the National League during April. Nationals relievers pitched in all 25 games in April and gave up runs in 19 of them. Although Nationals relievers issued a National League-lowest 2.93 walks per nine innings and threw a higher percentage of their pitches in the strike zone than any other MLB bullpen by a full two percentage points, they also threw the fourth-lowest number of first-pitch strikes among MLB bullpens, suggesting problems with command in the strike zone. Much of the bullpen's struggles came from relievers giving up 1.86 home runs per nine innings, a rate one full home run higher than the previous season's.

=== May ===
The Nationals optioned starter Joe Ross to Class-AAA Syracuse on May 1, following consecutive starts in which he failed to pitch five full innings, and called up pitcher A. J. Cole. Closer Shawn Kelley landed on the 10-day disabled list on May 5 with a lower back strain and reliever Matt Grace was recalled from Class-AAA Syracuse. With both Kelley and alternate closer Koda Glover on the shelf with injuries, reliever Matt Albers was called upon to close out a 4–2 game against the division rival Philadelphia Phillies on May 5. Albers hit the leadoff batter with a pitch but retired the next three to finally earn his first career save. (Note: Albers was an oddity among relief pitchers: Entering the May 5 game, he had played 16 seasons of professional baseball, 12 of them at the major-league level and 10 of those as a full-time reliever, without ever earning a save, despite appearing in 592 professional baseball games, including 460 games at the major-league level and 436 major-league relief appearances, and despite finishing 102 major-league games; only Ryan Webb, with 105 major-league games finished, had finished more major-league games without ever earning a save. (See Zuckerman, Mark, "After 461 appearances, Albers finally gets to save the game," masnsports.com, May 6, 2017.)) After that game, Albers had allowed no runs, no walks, and only four hits in 11 1/3 innings pitched thus far into the season. He gave up a home run and blew a save in his next appearance on May 7.

On May 6 in a 6–2 victory at Philadelphia, outfielder Rafael Bautista made his first career start (playing right field) and notched his first career hit, a single through the infield off Phillies pitcher Vince Velasquez. Bautista was optioned back to Syracuse on May 8, as the Nationals recalled outfielder Brian Goodwin to take his place on the bench. After being swept in two games at Oriole Park at Camden Yards against their American League "natural rival", the Baltimore Orioles, the Nationals rallied as the annual home-and-home "Beltway Series" came to Washington, coming from behind on May 10 to win on a walk-off single by former Orioles catcher Matt Wieters. The series finale on May 11 was rained out — it was rescheduled for June 8 — as was the next day's game against the Phillies, which was rescheduled for May 14 as part of a day-night Sunday doubleheader. Glover and Kelley were activated from the disabled list on May 12, with Cole and Grace being optioned to Syracuse, but Grace returned days later after reliever Joe Blanton was placed on the disabled list with right shoulder inflammation on May 17 after a string of poor performances out of the bullpen.

On May 13, the Nationals announced they had reached a one-year deal for the 2018 season with right fielder Bryce Harper at $21.625 million — the highest salary for an arbitration-eligible player in MLB history (Note: Prior to Harper′s May 2017 arbitration deal, the largest deal for an arbitration-eligible MLB player had been for a $20.1 million annual salary for center fielder Mike Trout as part of his six-year contract extension with the Los Angeles Angels of Anaheim in 2014, while the highest one-year deal for an arbitration-eligible MLB player had been $19.8 million for pitcher David Price with the Detroit Tigers in 2015. (See Janes, Chelsea, and Jorge Castillo, "Nationals and Bryce Harper reach deal for 2018, taking arbitration off the table," The Washington Post, May 13, 2017.)) — effectively buying out Harper's final year of arbitration eligibility; it was a raise of about $8 million over his 2017 salary. (Note: Harper′s 2017 salary, agreed to via arbitration in January 2017, was $13.625 million. (See Janes, Chelsea, "Bryce Harper settles for $13.625 million; Rendon will make $5.8 million," The Washington Post, January 13, 2017, and Janes, Chelsea, and Jorge Castillo, "Nationals and Bryce Harper reach deal for 2018, taking arbitration off the table," The Washington Post, May 13, 2017.)) That night, Harper hit a two-run walk-off home run to defeat the Phillies 6–4, with Kelley earning the win in relief. In the second game of the day-night doubleheader, which the Nationals split with the Phillies, on May 14, Washington starting pitcher Max Scherzer threw just the second immaculate inning in team history, striking out César Hernández, Odubel Herrera, and Aaron Altherr on nine pitches in the fifth inning en route to a 6–5 victory. (Note: Jordan Zimmermann was the first Nationals pitcher to notch an immaculate inning, accomplishing the feat on May 6, 2011, against the Florida Marlins. On three occasions, Montreal Expos pitchers threw immaculate innings prior to the franchise's relocation to Washington, D.C. (See Reddington, Patrick, "Nationals’ Max Scherzer throws immaculate inning vs Phillies tonight in D.C.," Federal Baseball, May 14, 2017.)) In the team's next game on May 16, Harper notched another personal achievement as he hit a home run at PNC Park against the Pittsburgh Pirates, the last ballpark in the National League at which Harper had not homered.

Ross was recalled from Class-AAA Syracuse for a start against the Seattle Mariners in interleague play at Nationals Park on May 23. Goodwin was optioned back to Syracuse to make room on the roster, giving the Nationals a four-man bench and an eight-man bullpen. However, Goodwin was recalled the next day after outfielder Chris Heisey tore his biceps tendon while taking batting practice before the game, an injury that put him on the disabled list. On May 25, manager Dusty Baker named Glover as the team's closer after previously hinting that he would be giving the rookie right-hander the ninth inning. "He had said that's the job he wanted, and so it's his now," Baker explained. Saving a 5–1 game with the bases loaded by the San Diego Padres on May 26, Glover struck out Hunter Renfroe to end the game on a 95.6 mph slider, the hardest slider thrown for a swinging strike all year. Starting pitcher Stephen Strasburg set a personal best in a win on May 27, striking out 15 Padres to exceed his previous career high by one. The 3–0 win over San Diego was also the first shutout thrown by Nationals pitchers in the 2017 season.

Infielder Stephen Drew returned from the disabled list, with Grace once again optioned to Syracuse, and the Nationals began a nine-game swing through California on May 29. In the first game of the road trip, the Nationals obtained their second shutout win of the year, beating the San Francisco Giants 3–0 behind a strong start by Tanner Roark. The game was marred, however, by an eighth-inning brawl that broke out after Giants reliever Hunter Strickland, facing Harper for the first time since the Nationals right fielder went 2-for-2 with two home runs off him during the 2014 National League Division Series, drilled Harper in the hip with a 98 mph fastball with his first pitch. Harper tossed aside his bat and charged Strickland on the mound, throwing his helmet wide to the left of Strickland before the two players traded punches. They were separated by their teammates, with Giants first baseman and former National Michael Morse quickly getting between them before being bowled over (and concussed) by Giants pitcher and former University of Notre Dame football star Jeff Samardzija, and ejected from the game. Harper said after the game that he decided immediately that the pitch was intentional: "You never want to get suspended or anything like that, but sometimes you've got to go and get him. You can't hesitate. You either go to first base or you go after him, and I decided to go after him." He suggested Strickland was retaliating for the 2014 home runs (which Strickland denied), saying, "It was three years ago. ... I don't know why he's thinking about it. He's got a World Series ring, it's on his finger, and he can look at it every single night he wants to." Both Harper and Strickland were issued suspensions by Major League Baseball, with Harper receiving a four-game penalty, which was lowered on appeal to three games. He began serving the suspension on May 31.

The Nationals finished May with a sweep of the Giants in their three-game set at AT&T Park, their only series sweep of the month. During May, they won a series at home against the Arizona Diamondbacks, then won a series on the road against the Phillies, lost both games at Oriole Park at Camden Yards, won the one game against the Orioles played at Nationals Park (with the second postponed until June), took another series against the Phillies at home, lost back-to-back series on the road against the Pirates and division rival Atlanta Braves, and then won consecutive series at home against the Mariners and Padres before the sweep in San Francisco. The Nationals led the National League East Division by 9 1/2 games over the New York Mets with a 33–19 record at the end of the month, one of just two MLB teams with fewer than 20 losses (with the Houston Astros in the American League) and owning the best win percentage in the National League.

=== June ===
The month of June began with the Nationals taking two out of three in interleague play visiting the Oakland Athletics. Outfielder Brian Goodwin struck his first major league home run off Athletics reliever Zach Neal on June 2, a two-run shot over the high wall in Oakland Coliseum's right-center field. Starting pitcher Joe Ross's place in the rotation was unclear after a second consecutive losing start in which he failed to go more than four innings, as he gave up seven runs in three innings of a 10–4 loss to the Athletics on June 3. The Nationals also got bad news on injured outfielder Chris Heisey, as he was evaluated after a short rehab assignment and shut down due to swelling in his arm after he ruptured a biceps tendon the previous month, with manager Dusty Baker telling media that Heisey "might have rushed it a little sooner than he should have". On June 4, the Nationals defeated Oakland 11–10, but the win brought up fresh concerns about the team's bullpen after closer Koda Glover and reliever Shawn Kelley combined to allow six earned runs in the bottom of the ninth inning, including four on a grand slam home run by Matt Joyce off Kelley, before Kelley locked down the save. Outfielder Jayson Werth was placed on the 10-day disabled list after fouling a ball off his foot in the June 3 game, and the Nationals selected the contract of veteran utilityman Ryan Raburn on June 5 as they headed into a three-game series with the Los Angeles Dodgers, their first meeting with the Dodgers since the 2016 National League Division Series, to take over for Werth in left field. Minor league pitcher Rafael Martin was designated for assignment to make room for Raburn on the 40-man roster.

Starting pitcher Max Scherzer joined an exclusive club of pitchers in a June 6 game against the Dodgers by striking out 11 batters through the first four innings of the game. The feat had only been accomplished by four other pitchers in major league history. (Note: Nolan Ryan, Randy Johnson, Zack Greinke, and Alex Cobb were the only pitchers who had 11 strikeouts through their first four innings prior to Scherzer's outing, tying for the all-time record. (See McCotter, Trent, "Max Scherzer is 5th pitcher in MLB history with 11 K thru first 4 innings of a game," twitter.com, June 6, 2017.)) Scherzer ultimately ended up with 14 strikeouts and zero earned runs through seven innings of a 2–1 Nationals victory. The Nationals dropped the last game of the series to Clayton Kershaw, the Dodgers' ace, to finish 7–2 on their California roadtrip. Washington's Stephen Strasburg, who took the loss despite giving up just one earned run over seven innings and striking out eight Dodgers, tied Kerry Wood's record for most strikeouts in the first 1,000 innings of a starting pitcher's career at 1,166 during the game. Getting another start after a pair of poor outings, Ross bounced back in a makeup game against the Baltimore Orioles in interleague play at Nationals Park on June 8, pitching 7 1/3 innings and allowing one earned run for the win and setting a new personal best for strikeouts in a game with 12.

The Nationals were swept at home for the first time in 2017 by the Texas Rangers in interleague play. Closer Glover blew his first save opportunity of the season on June 10 and admitted after the game that he had injured his back that morning and had not told the team about his condition. Glover was placed on the disabled list the next day and Joe Blanton was reactivated. On June 12, infielder Wilmer Difo — who had frozen up on a potential game-winning bunt single in the June 10 game while leading off third base, being tagged out in a rundown before an eventual Nationals 6–3 loss — was optioned to the Class-AAA Syracuse Chiefs. Reliever Trevor Gott was called up, giving the Nationals an eight-man bullpen as they headed into a series against the division rival Atlanta Braves. Gott picked up the win in his first game on June 13, with the Nationals defeating the Braves 10–5, but after a relief appearance the following day in which he was charged with five earned runs over 1 2/3 innings, he was optioned back to Class-AAA Syracuse and left-hander Matt Grace recalled for a series against the division rival New York Mets beginning June 15. The Nationals took three out of four against the Mets, with Grace appearing in two games.

On June 18, Kelley was placed on the disabled list with a trapezius strain amid a dismal stretch that saw him post a rate of 4.5 home runs per nine innings, and right-handed pitcher A. J. Cole was called up from Syracuse to take his place on the roster. Cole did not appear in a game before the Nationals optioned him back to Syracuse on June 22. Difo was recalled the following day for a series against the Cincinnati Reds, with center fielder Michael A. Taylor reportedly dealing with an undisclosed injury. Difo made his first career start in the outfield on June 23, playing center field, but after multiple defensive misplays that led to Cincinnati runs, he was lifted from the game in favor of Raburn. The Nationals defeated the Reds 6–5 behind Goodwin's first career two-homer game and a walk-off single by right fielder Bryce Harper. Taylor returned to the starting lineup on June 24, notching four hits with two home runs in an 18–3 rout of the Reds.

In a 6–1 victory over the visiting Chicago Cubs, defending World Series champions, on June 27, the Nationals tied a franchise record for stolen bases in a game with seven, all off the battery of pitcher Jake Arrieta and catcher Miguel Montero. Four of those steals were notched by shortstop Trea Turner, who stole seven bases in the four-game series against the Cubs at Nationals Park before leaving the rubber game on June 29 after being hit in the right wrist by a fastball from reliever Pedro Strop. The team announced after the game, a seesaw 5–4 loss, that Turner had suffered a non-displaced fracture in his wrist, an injury for which the team offered no recovery timetable but which Turner compared to a similar wrist fracture weeks earlier in the season that had sidelined Braves first baseman Freddie Freeman for an anticipated two months. Turner was placed on the 10-day disabled list and the Nationals selected the contract of infielder Adrián Sánchez from Class-AAA Syracuse to replace him on the roster, moving rehabbing left-handed reliever Sammy Solis to the 60-day disabled list in the process. The injury announcement came just a day after Glover, placed on the disabled list earlier in the month with back stiffness, told reporters he had been experiencing right shoulder pain since late May and was continuing to deal with severe rotator cuff inflammation after initially trying to pitch through the issue. He blamed the back injury, which he said involved a displaced vertebra after he slipped while showering, on "overcompensation" due to the shoulder pain. The Nationals also lost first base coach Davey Lopes during the Cubs series, as he was granted leave from the team due to a family emergency. Outfield and baserunning coordinator Gary Thurman took over Lopes' role in his absence.

In sum, heading into a three-game roadtrip visiting the St. Louis Cardinals and extending into the next month, the Nationals won series against the Athletics and the Dodgers and then earned a season split with the Orioles by winning their makeup game to begin the month on a positive run, then lost their next two series against the Rangers and Braves before taking three out of four in Queens against the Mets, dropped a series on the road against the Miami Marlins, and then returned home to win a three-game series against the Reds and split their four-game set with the Cubs. The Nationals dropped their series opener at St. Louis 8–1 on June 30, with Sánchez making his major league debut as a pinch-runner and defensive replacement at shortstop late in the game, to finish 14–14 in June wins and losses, 8 1/2 games over the Braves and 9 1/2 games over the Mets, with a 47–33 overall win–loss record. It was the first full month since September 2015 in which they did not post a winning record.

Two Nationals stars — Scherzer and first baseman Ryan Zimmerman — made franchise history in June. On June 13, Zimmerman hit two home runs off Braves starter R. A. Dickey to tie Vladimir Guerrero for the Montreal–Washington franchise record of 234 home runs, although he did not hit another home run for the remainder of the month and finished June still tied with Guerrero for the record. One start after recording his 2,000th strikeout against the Rangers, Scherzer struck out ten Mets on June 16 to tie Pedro Martínez's franchise mark of five consecutive starts with double-digit strikeouts, and in his next start on June 21, he struck out 11 Marlins to set the franchise record at six. Scherzer was named the National League Pitcher of the Month, posting a 0.99 ERA on the month.

=== July ===
Following a rough outing in long relief for Jacob Turner the previous day, the Nationals designated him for assignment on July 1. Left-handed reliever Sammy Solis was activated off the 60-day disabled list. The Nationals rallied in the ninth inning of their July 1 game against the St. Louis Cardinals, scoring a run and loading the bases against closer Trevor Rosenthal. St. Louis brought in reliever Matt Bowman to try to nail down his first career save, while Nationals manager Dusty Baker sent infielder Adrián Sánchez to the plate to pinch-hit in his first MLB at-bat. Sánchez worked the count full before taking a pitch roughly six inches off the plate away for what would have been ball four and a game-tying walk, but home plate umpire Manny Gonzalez called him out on strikes to end the game at 2–1 in the Cardinals' favor. Baker praised Sánchez after the game, saying the call "just wasn't fair to him" and remarking, "You hate to have an at-bat like that and have it settled on apparently a bad call." In the following game, on July 2, minutes after being named to play in the 2017 All-Star Game as the top overall National League vote-getter, right fielder Bryce Harper hit two home runs off fellow All-Star Carlos Martínez. Starting pitcher Max Scherzer, also named to the All-Star roster, struck out 12 Cardinals while allowing no runs in seven innings to earn the 7–2 win.

The Nationals played their annual Independence Day contest at Nationals Park on July 4 against the division rival New York Mets, with Joe Ross starting for the home team. The Nationals won 11–4, marking yet another game for Ross in which he received run support in the double-digits: his seventh in 12 starts on the season to that point. The win was also Washington's 50th of the season. The next day's game was postponed due to rain, while the game on the day after that — the opener of a series at Nationals Park against Washington's top division rival, the Atlanta Braves — was delayed for more than three hours due to a thunderstorm in the forecast, which never materialized, prompting some criticism of the Nationals for unnecessarily pushing back the start time until 10:10 p.m. EDT. The July 6 game, which actually finished early in the morning of July 7 due to the late start, was a 5–2 Braves win. Starting center fielder Michael A. Taylor was lifted midway through the game with an oblique strain, which manager Dusty Baker announced after the game would send him to the 10-day disabled list, with outfielder Chris Heisey being activated from the disabled list in a corresponding move. The Nationals struck back that evening, mounting a ferocious ninth-inning rally in the July 7 game to come back from a three-run deficit and force extra innings. In the tenth inning, the shortstop Sánchez lined a slider from former National Ian Krol, pitching in relief for Atlanta, up the middle for his first career hit. Three at-bats later, Sánchez came around to score on second baseman Daniel Murphy's walk-off single over the head of left fielder Matt Kemp, and the Nationals won 5–4. In the July 8 game, though, the Nationals suffered their first shutout of the year, losing 13–0 as the Braves pummeled starter Stephen Strasburg, who exited the game in the third inning after being hit on the hip with a line drive comebacker; usual starter Tanner Roark, in his first relief appearance of the season; and Solis, still working his way back from injury. The Nationals defeated Atlanta 10–5 to earn a split of the four-game series on July 9, in their last game before the All-Star Break. Ross again received double-digit run support, for the eighth time in 13 starts to begin the season, but exited in the fourth inning after exhibiting a marked decrease in velocity and struggling with his command. The team announced several days later that Ross would undergo Tommy John surgery, forcing him to miss the remainder of the season and beyond.

With Ross on the disabled list and Solis optioned back to the Class-AAA Syracuse Chiefs after a string of poor relief outings, the Nationals promoted right-handed relievers Trevor Gott and Austin L. Adams from Syracuse for a series against the Cincinnati Reds beginning July 14. Behind starter Gio González's first outing of at least eight innings long since 2015, the Nationals shut out the Reds 5–0 in the July 14 game, as González went 8 1/3 innings and reliever Matt Grace notched his first career save, inheriting a bases-loaded jam from setup man Matt Albers and inducing a groundout to end the ballgame. Both Gott and Adams floundered in the July 15 game in Cincinnati, giving up a combined seven runs without retiring a batter, as Adams loaded the bases, walked in a run, and gave up an RBI single in his major league debut before being relieved by Óliver Pérez, and Gott surrendered two runs on base hits followed by a three-run home run by Scooter Gennett in the ninth inning before Grace came into the game and retired the side in order for his second career save, a day after his first, preserving a 10–7 final score. In the first three games of the series, for the first time in Montreal–Washington franchise history, three different players hit two home runs per game: Harper on July 14, Anthony Rendon on July 15, and Murphy on July 16.

On July 16, the Nationals completed a five-player trade with the Oakland Athletics, acquiring relievers Sean Doolittle and Ryan Madson for right-hander Blake Treinen and prospects Jesus Luzardo and Sheldon Neuse. Ross was moved to the 60-day disabled list to make room on the roster. The Nationals again purchased Turner's contract from Syracuse, re-adding him to the roster, to take Treinen's place in the bullpen on July 17 while awaiting the activation of Doolittle and Madson, who were expected to join the team in Anaheim the next day for a series against the Los Angeles Angels in interleague play; injured closer Koda Glover was transferred to the 60-day disabled list to clear roster space. That day, Washington concluded a four-game sweep of their series in Cincinnati in a 6–1 game that included several notable occurrences: Ryan Zimmerman hit his 20th home run of the year to surpass Expos star Vladimir Guerrero's Montreal–Washington franchise record with 235 career home runs as a National, Murphy scored all the way from second base on a sacrifice fly hit by catcher Matt Wieters, and Murphy struck out three times for the first time since May 20, 2014, when he was with the Mets.

The Washington Post reported that amid a slower-than-anticipated recovery for left fielder Jayson Werth from a bruised foot suffered the previous month, Werth said on July 18 that scans had revealed a fracture of his first metatarsal bone as well as a bone bruise. The Nationals made a series of roster moves on July 18 as well: Turner was designated for assignment for the second time of the month, just a day after being re-added to the roster and without appearing in a game in that brief stint, while Adams and Gott were optioned back to Class-AAA Syracuse. Those roster moves cleared room for the Nationals to activate Doolittle and Madson as well as select the contract of Edwin Jackson from Syracuse, tabbing Jackson to start the first of their two-game interleague series against the Angels. The changes to the pitching staff left the Nationals unusually heavy on left-handed relievers, with four in the bullpen (Doolittle, Grace, Pérez, and Enny Romero) to three right-handers (Albers, Joe Blanton, and Madson). Making his first start for the Nationals since the 2012 season, Jackson pitched seven innings and gave up two earned runs, both on solo home runs, to earn his first win of the season. Doolittle gave up his first hit of the year to a left-handed hitter, a double high off the wall by Kole Calhoun, but nailed down the save after allowing an earned run in his first appearance for Washington. Harper came a close call at second base away from hitting for the cycle in the July 18 contest, as he was called out trying to stretch a single into a double while going 4-for-4 overall with a home run and a triple.

The Arizona Diamondbacks led off what would ultimately be a 6–5 victory on July 21 over the visiting Nationals with back-to-back-to-back home runs off Scherzer, the first time in Nationals history that an opponent had blasted three consecutive home runs in a game and the first time it had happened to Scherzer. (Note: The most recent time any major league team had started a game with three consecutive home runs was on May 10, 2012, when the Baltimore Orioles did it against the Texas Rangers. (See "Diamondbacks open with back-to-back-to-back HRs against Nationals," espn.com, July 22, 2017.)) The Nationals rallied to win the second game of the series behind a revamped pitch arsenal from starter Roark, who befuddled Diamondbacks batters by ditching his four-seam fastball and mixing in a heavier-than-usual dose of curveballs. Facing rookie starting pitcher Anthony Banda in his major league debut, Harper crushed a 467-foot home run onto the Chase Field concourse in right-center field — the longest home run of his career to that point — to extend his hitting streak to a career-best 15 games. Heisey suffered a groin injury while legging out a pivotal triple in the 4–3 contest and was placed on the 10-day disabled list. Left fielder Ryan Raburn was also assigned to the bereavement list, taking leave to attend his grandfather's funeral. Washington recalled catcher Pedro Severino and selected the contract of outfield prospect Andrew Stevenson to take Heisey and Raburn's roster spots. Stevenson made his major league debut in the July 23 rubber game, being inserted mid-game to replace Wilmer Difo in left field and going 0-for-2 at the plate. The Nationals won 6–2, but Strasburg exited the game just two innings into his start with forearm tightness, with Blanton picking up the win in relief. The Nationals announced July 25 that Strasburg had been treated for a nerve impingement. He was placed on the 10-day disabled list, with top pitching prospect Erick Fedde tabbed to make a spot start in his place. Raburn was transferred from the bereavement list to the disabled list with a trapezius strain on July 26. The Nationals recalled Solis to give them an extra reliever the next day, bringing the bullpen up to a total of five left-handed relievers. First base coach Davey Lopes returned the same day after an extended leave of absence.

On July 27, the Nationals tied a franchise record for home runs hit in a game, blasting eight in a 15–2 rout of the visiting Milwaukee Brewers. (Note: The eight-homer eruption tied the mark set by the Montreal Expos on July 30, 1978, against the Atlanta Braves. (See Ginsburg, David, "Brewers: Nationals hit eight home runs, tie two MLB records in rout," Wisconsin State Journal, July 27, 2017, and "8 Expo homers bury Braves," Chicago Tribune, July 31, 1978.)) In the third inning, the center fielder Brian Goodwin, the shortstop Difo, the right fielder Harper, and the first baseman Zimmerman hit back-to-back-to-back-to-back home runs off Brewers pitcher Michael Blazek, a veteran reliever getting his first major league start. (Note: The most recent time a major league team had tallied four consecutive home runs in a game was August 11, 2010, when the Arizona Diamondbacks went back-to-back-to-back-to-back. Coincidentally, the Diamondbacks' feat also came against the Milwaukee Brewers. (See Rapaport, Daniel, "Watch: Nationals Go Back-to-Back-to-Back-to-Back, Hit Five Homers in One Inning," si.com, July 27, 2017.)) Rendon, the Nationals' third baseman, added another home run off Blazek later in the inning to tie the major league record for home runs in an inning with five, with Blazek setting a new record for home runs surrendered by a single pitcher in an inning. After being inserted mid-game to play center field, Stevenson rifled a line drive single to right field in the eighth inning, his first major league hit, off Brewers outfielder Hernán Pérez, sent to the mound for his major league pitching debut with his team trailing by 13 runs. Scherzer earned the win over Blazek and the Brewers on his 33rd birthday.

After having traded Luzardo as part of the deal with the Athletics, the Nationals traded two more left-handed pitching prospects at the July non-waiver trade deadline. First, they made a trade with the division rival Philadelphia Phillies on July 28, fencing 18th-ranked prospect McKenzie Mills to Philadelphia for veteran utilityman Howie Kendrick. Kendrick was activated the next day, with the Nationals placing infielder Stephen Drew on the 10-day disabled list and designating minor league first baseman Matt Skole for assignment to clear a spot on the 40-man roster. Kendrick lashed a pinch-hit double in his Nationals debut against Germán Márquez of the Colorado Rockies in the July 29 game and scored one of the team's two runs in the 4–2 loss, in which Harper's hitting streak came to an end at 19 games. Heading into a double-header against the Rockies on July 30 due to a rainout, the Nationals selected Fedde's contract to start the first game. In a corresponding move, they released veteran outfielder Heisey, who had hit .162 for Washington while spending considerable time on the disabled list during the season. In his major league debut, Fedde pitched four innings while giving up seven runs, five of them earned, and striking out three. He took the loss in the 10–6 contest, in which Zimmerman homered twice to set a new record in the history of Washington, D.C., professional baseball for career home runs, surpassing Frank Howard's mark of 237 for the Washington Senators. Severino was optioned July 30 but remained with the team for the day as an extra player allowed on the roster for the double-header. Minutes after the expiry of the July 31 trade deadline, the Nationals announced they had completed a trade with the Minnesota Twins to acquire closer Brandon Kintzler for 17th-ranked prospect Tyler J. Watson. Minor league reliever Jimmy Cordero was designated for assignment to clear space for Kintzler on the 40-man roster.

The Nationals finished July having won four series and lost two, including the three-game set against the Cardinals that began the previous month, while splitting two. Coming out of St. Louis, they swept two games against the Mets (with the third game of the series postponed by rain), split a four-game set with the Braves, swept the Reds in four games after the All-Star break, split a two-game series visiting the Angels, took two out of three against both the Diamondbacks and the Brewers, and dropped two of three to the Rockies before heading to Miami to play the division rival Marlins for three games beginning July 31. In that game, the Nationals shut out the Marlins 1–0 behind eight no-hit innings from their starter González, pitching on what would have been the 25th birthday of his friend, the late Marlins pitcher José Fernández. With the win, the Nationals improved to 63–41, finishing the month of July up 14 games on the second-place Marlins in the National League East Division and with the second-best overall record in the National League.

=== August ===
Ace Max Scherzer hit his first career home run, a three-run shot off Miami Marlins starter Chris O'Grady in the second inning on August 1. Scherzer was unable to complete his pitching warm-up afterward, however, exiting after just one inning of work with what the team announced as a neck spasm. Scherzer said after the game he had "slept on it wrong" and considered it a day-to-day injury rather than a serious issue. The Nationals were unable to hold Scherzer's six-run lead, as the division rival Marlins won 7–6 despite a 5-for-5 performance from Nationals left fielder Howie Kendrick. Washington called up A. J. Cole from the Class-AAA Syracuse Chiefs for a spot start on August 2, a 7–0 shutout at the hands of the Marlins to give them the series win, with former Nationals spring training invitee Vance Worley earning the win for Miami. The team also activated right-handed reliever Brandon Kintzler after he was acquired in a July 31 trade with the Minnesota Twins. Starter Erick Fedde and left-handed reliever Sammy Solis were optioned to Syracuse. Solis was recalled August 4, however, with left-handed reliever Enny Romero landing on the disabled list with a left forearm strain. Fedde also returned to the major league team on August 5, as starting pitcher Gio González took leave from the team for the birth of his second child. The Nationals clinched a series win over the Chicago Cubs with a 9–4 victory on August 6, as although Fedde left the game after 5 1/3 innings in line for the loss, having given up three home runs and four earned runs in total in his second major league start, the team rallied to take the lead against Cubs reliever Carl Edwards Jr., who hit third baseman Anthony Rendon on the shoulder with the bases loaded and ended up taking the loss as catcher Matt Wieters hit the next pitch out to straightaway center field for a go-ahead grand slam. Fedde was optioned back to Syracuse on August 7, as González was activated.

The Nationals took three out of four from the division rival Marlins at Nationals Park, capping the series win on August 10 with a diving catch down the left field line by rookie outfielder Andrew Stevenson to take away an RBI and extra bases from Miami second baseman Dee Gordon with two outs in the top of the ninth. The catch preserved a 3–2 ballgame as closer Sean Doolittle locked down the save. Also in the series, on August 9, first baseman Ryan Zimmerman turned in a two-homer effort as he overtook Tim Wallach as the RBI leader in Montreal–Washington franchise history. Wallach, who played for the Montreal Expos, was in the visitors' dugout for the series as the Marlins' bench coach. After an August 11 rainout and a lengthy rain delay on August 12, in the first inning of a late-night home game against the San Francisco Giants, Nationals right fielder Bryce Harper slipped on first base while running out a grounder, crashed to the ground, and had to be carried off the field. After the Nationals downed the Giants 3–1, with the game finishing early in the morning of August 13, manager Dusty Baker announced Harper had hyperextended his left knee. General manager Mike Rizzo said later in the day that tests showed Harper had "significant" bruising of the bones in his left knee but had avoided any ligament or tendon damage, meaning he was expected to be able to return later in the season. Harper was placed on the disabled list and outfielder Michael A. Taylor was reactivated from a rehab assignment with the Class-AA Harrisburg Senators to take his place on the roster. The Nationals also recalled catcher Pedro Severino for the day as an extra man for a doubleheader with the Giants. The Nationals and Giants split the doubleheader, with Giants taking the day game behind seven shutout innings from rookie Chris Stratton and the Nationals losing yet another outfielder, Brian Goodwin, to a groin injury in the eighth inning, before Washington won the night game on an eleventh-inning grand slam by Kendrick, the first of his career.

The Nationals optioned Cole to Syracuse and recalled Severino to the 25-man roster on August 15, ahead of an interleague game at Nationals Park against the Los Angeles Angels. The Nationals defeated the Angels in the August 15 game, with Kendrick hitting his 100th and 101st career home runs to provide Washington with its margin of victory in the 3–1 game. In another set of roster moves on August 16, Goodwin was placed on the 10-day disabled list, injured shortstop Trea Turner was transferred from the 10-day disabled list to the 60-day disabled list, and veteran outfielder Alejandro De Aza had his contract selected from the Chiefs. The Nationals also disclosed that primary setup man Ryan Madson was dealing with a medical issue with one of the fingers on his throwing hand. Madson was placed on the 10-day disabled list with a right finger sprain, retroactive to August 14, and veteran reliever Shawn Kelley was activated from the disabled list August 17 after completing a rehab assignment with the Chiefs. Scherzer was a late scratch as the August 18 starter, and the Nationals announced he would also go on the 10-day disabled list, retroactive to August 15, as his neck strain recurred. Reliever Matt Grace was called upon to make his first major league start in Scherzer's place, and he turned in 4 1/3 scoreless innings as the Nationals defeated the San Diego Padres 7–1, with middle reliever Joe Blanton getting credit for the win. The only run was given up by Kelley, who allowed a solo home run to Dusty Coleman in his return to action against his former team. Scherzer was replaced on the roster by starting pitcher Stephen Strasburg, activated August 19 after nearly a month on the disabled list. Strasburg turned in a quality start that day against the Padres, giving up just two earned runs in six innings, but took the 3–1 loss as an injury-depleted Nationals lineup could not solve San Diego's pitching.

Baker attempted an unorthodox deployment of his late-inning relievers in an August 24 rubber game against the Houston Astros in interleague play, sending out Doolittle for the eighth and Kintzler for the ninth. Both relievers struggled, with Doolittle allowing a run before Kintzler allowed two, blowing the save opportunity. The Nationals ultimately won the game and the series 5–4 in the eleventh inning, with Solis earning the save, the first of his career. Baker explained after the game that he had been attempting to play matchups, using Doolittle against left-handed batters in the eighth before Kintzler handled Houston's right-handed batters in the ninth; Kintzler, however, said the Nationals were trying to get him to 30 saves on the season, after he had collected 28 with the Twins prior to being traded at the end of July. Upon returning to Washington, D.C., on August 25, the Nationals optioned Severino to Syracuse and recalled Cole for a spot start against the division rival New York Mets, in which Cole took the loss despite allowing only one run over six innings and setting a new personal best for strikeouts with eight in what ended as a 4–2 Mets victory. In a harrowing moment in the eighth inning of the next game in the series on August 26, a 9–4 bounceback victory for Washington, Nationals second baseman Adrián Sánchez was felled by a foul tip into the chest after trying to bunt away a 97-mph fastball from Mets reliever Jeurys Familia that sailed in on him. Sánchez was able to finish out his at-bat, driving home a run with a single into left field for his third RBI of the day, before being pulled from the game and hospitalized overnight for observation and testing. Sánchez was released in the morning after a CT test determined he had escaped serious injury. Cole was optioned back to the minors on August 27, as outfielder Rafael Bautista was recalled and Fedde was brought up as the 26th man for a day-night doubleheader against the Mets. The Nationals split the doubleheader, losing the first game — displaying diminished velocity and giving up five runs on two home runs, Fedde took a no-decision as the Nationals rallied back from a five-run deficit only to lose 6–5, as pinch-runner Edwin Jackson was thrown out at home plate in the bottom of the ninth inning to end the game — and winning the second 5–4 behind a quality start from Tanner Roark and a go-ahead RBI by Stevenson, the first of his career, on a bases-loaded walk.

On August 28, Scherzer and outfielder Jayson Werth were both activated from the disabled list, as Bautista and Stevenson were optioned back to Class-AAA Syracuse and infielder Stephen Drew was transferred to the 60-day disabled list as he remained sidelined with an abdominal strain. In his return to action, Scherzer threw seven innings of one-hit ball against the visiting Marlins to record the 11–2 win, with Werth contributing with a two-run home run as part of a 2-for-4 day. Sánchez was optioned to Syracuse and outfielder Ryan Raburn moved to the 60-day disabled list with a trapezius injury as the Nationals activated shortstop Trea Turner, out since late June with a broken wrist, from the 60-day disabled list on August 29. Turner led off and doubled in his first game back, an 8–3 victory for the Nationals behind a quality start from Jackson and a strong offensive performance by the second baseman Daniel Murphy and the third baseman Rendon, who combined for seven RBIs in the August 29 contest. The Nationals completed their three-game sweep of Miami on August 30 as Strasburg threw his first complete game shutout since the 2013 season while also hitting a go-ahead home run off Marlins starter Adam Conley, his second of the year. The Nationals tacked on three more runs in the game to win 4–0.

The Nationals headed out to Milwaukee for the start of a seven-game roadtrip beginning August 31 and stretching into September having posted their highest win total in a month for the season, despite injuries to key players like Harper, Scherzer, and Madson during August. After losing the last two games in their three-game set in Miami to start the month, they proceeded to win two of three from the Cubs on the road, win three of four from the Marlins and then two of three from the Giants at home, split the two-game interleague series with the visiting Angels, win three of four from the Padres and then two of three from the Astros on the road, split the four-game series with the visiting Mets, and then sweep the Marlins in three games at home. The Milwaukee Brewers ended Washington's four-game winning streak, winning 6–3 in the August 31 series opener despite Turner falling a home run shy of hitting for the cycle. All in all, the Nationals went 18–11 over the month of August and finished the month with an 81–52 record, good for second overall in the National League behind the Los Angeles Dodgers and 15 games up over the second-place Marlins in the National League East.

=== September ===
Rosters expanded on September 1. In their first wave of call-ups, the Nationals recalled pitchers Austin L. Adams and Erick Fedde from the Class-AAA Syracuse Chiefs, as well as catcher Raudy Read from the Class-AA Harrisburg Senators. The team also activated relievers Ryan Madson and Enny Romero from the disabled list. Read made his major league debut on September 3, grounding out in a pinch-hit appearance in the eighth inning before coming in as the Nationals' substitute catcher. Adams collected his first career major league out after loading the bases in the eighth inning and inducing a groundball to shortstop Trea Turner, who flicked it to Read for the forceout at home. Two runs scored, however, on a passed ball by Read and a sacrifice fly hit to Howie Kendrick in left field. The Nationals lost the game 7−2 to complete a one-out-of-four showing at Miller Park against the Brewers, their first series loss in a month, although first baseman Ryan Zimmerman hit his 30th home run of the season with two outs in the ninth inning to save the Nationals from being shut out for the second time in three games.

The Nationals placed Fedde on the 10-day disabled list on September 4 and recalled starting pitcher A. J. Cole from Syracuse, along with catcher Pedro Severino. Fedde was listed with a flexor strain in his right throwing arm, an injury expected to rule him out for the remainder of the season. Cole got the start on September 4 against the division rival Miami Marlins and earned the win in the 7−2 contest, in which Read notched his first career hit by chopping an infield single deflected off the glove of pitcher Jarlin García. Inserted in the ninth inning as a defensive substitute in left field, Alejandro De Aza leaped to take a home run away from Marlins pinch-hitter Tyler Moore to end the game. Posting six shutout innings while leading the Nationals to a 2−1 victory over Miami on September 5, starter Stephen Strasburg set a new team record for consecutive innings without allowing a run, at 26. (Note: The Nationals record for consecutive scoreless innings was previously 25, set by Gio González in April 2012. (See Frisaro, Joe, and Patrick Pinak, "Strasburg sets Nats record in win over Marlins," mlb.com, September 6, 2017 .)) Washington finished off the series with an 8−1 rout of the Marlins, their eighth victory against their second-place division rival in a row, in front of a crowd Reuters estimated at fewer than 800 at first pitch on September 6, with Hurricane Irma bearing down on South Florida and an evacuation order in place. Rookie Dillon Peters, starting on the mound for the Marlins, received his first career decision with the loss. Zimmerman homered off Peters on a count of three balls and no strikes, the first time in his 12-year major league career he had notched a hit in that count. (Note: Zimmerman improved to 1-for-4 in his career on a 3−0 count with the solo home run. Prior to the hit, he had last put a ball in play on a 3−0 count in a regular-season game on August 25, 2013, grounding out to the second baseman. (See Ferreira, Vic, "That was Zimmerman's 1st career hit on a 3-0 pitch," twitter.com, September 6, 2017 and "Washington Nationals at Kansas City Royals Box Score, August 25, 2013," baseball-reference.com.))

On September 7, the Nationals selected the contract of top overall prospect Víctor Robles. They cleared space for the 20-year-old outfielder on the 40-man roster by moving Fedde to the 60-day disabled list. Outfielders Rafael Bautista and Andrew Stevenson were also recalled. Manager Dusty Baker disclosed that outfielder Brian Goodwin had experienced a setback while rehabbing from a groin injury suffered the previous month, rendering his status doubtful for the rest of the season. Robles pinch-hit and flied out to deep right field in his major league debut as the Nationals took the first of four from the division rival Philadelphia Phillies, coming back to win 4−3. The Nationals made one more call-up on September 8, recalling infielder Adrián Sánchez in what Baker said was the last of the team's scheduled call-ups with expanded September rosters. In that evening's game against the Phillies, the Nationals won behind big offensive games from their shortstop Turner and their center fielder Michael A. Taylor, who respectively were a triple and a double shy of hitting for the cycle. Taylor hit the first major league inside-the-park grand slam in nearly two years, (Note: Ironically, Taylor had been the most recent fielder in Major League Baseball to allow a play scored as an inside-the-park grand slam, on Sept. 25, 2015, and it was hit by a Philadelphia Phillies outfielder, Aaron Altherr. (See Townsend, Mark, "Michael Taylor gets revenge on Phillies with inside-the-park grand slam," sports.yahoo.com, September 8, 2017.)) and the first in team history, (Note: Bombo Rivera had previously recorded the only inside-the-park grand slam in franchise history, for the Montreal Expos on June 26, 1976. For the Nationals, Taylor himself had previously cleared the bases and crossed the plate on a base hit in a September 8, 2015, game, exactly two years prior to his inside-the-park grand slam, but the play had been scored as a single and an error on New York Mets center fielder Yoenis Céspedes, who misplayed the ball. (See "Taylor's Inside-The-Park Slam Lifts Nats Over Phillies 11-10," U.S. News & World Report, September 8, 2017, and Carig, Marc, "Mets rally past Nationals after Matt Harvey is knocked out in sixth," Newsday, September 8, 2015).) as the Nationals defeated the Phillies in the dramatic 11−10 game. The Nationals took three out of four from the Phillies in the series, with Baker deploying a rookie-heavy team for the series finale on September 10 and Strasburg extending his scoreless inning streak to 34 innings, the longest of any major league pitcher in the season, as he earned the win in the 3−2 contest. Robles collected his first major league hit and RBI, driving in Sánchez with a double but being called out at third after he slid past the bag in an attempt to stretch the hit into a triple. With the Marlins losing to the Atlanta Braves the same day, the Nationals became the first team in the 2017 Major League Baseball season to clinch a spot in the playoffs and a division title, winning the National League East crown for the fourth time since their 2012 season.

The Nationals were shut out in their first game after clinching the division, blanked 8−0 by the Braves behind their ace Julio Teherán on September 12 to open a three-game series at Nationals Park. Appearing in his third major league game out of the bullpen, Nationals rookie reliever Adams recorded the first strikeout and first scoreless inning of his career. On September 13, injured closer Koda Glover announced he would not make a return in 2017 after reportedly suffering a setback in his rehabilitation from back and shoulder injuries. The Braves won the September 13 game, 8−2. The decisive blow in the game came when Baker kept Nationals ace Max Scherzer in to start the seventh inning, only for Scherzer to walk the bases loaded for just the second time in his career. Scherzer then gave up a two-run single to rookie shortstop Dansby Swanson to give the Braves the lead. After an intentional walk to first baseman Freddie Freeman, Scherzer exited the game and reliever Brandon Kintzler proceeded to give up a grand slam to left fielder Matt Kemp on his first pitch of the game, saddling Scherzer with seven earned runs in a significant blow to his chances of repeating as the National League Cy Young Award honoree. Baker and Scherzer both defended the move after the game, saying the pitcher had asked to go past 110 pitches in the game — he ended his outing at 116 pitches — in order to get "stretched out" for the postseason run. Baker said he had wanted to remove Scherzer sooner but decided to stick with the predetermined "game plan". The Nationals salvaged the three-game set with a 5−2 win on September 14 behind a quality start from Tanner Roark and a 2-for-4 game for the right fielder Robles, who set a new team record in the Statcast era for fastest time to third base on a triple, with 11.12 seconds, (Note: The record set by Robles eclipsed Trea Turner's best of 11.14 seconds, which he set during the 2016 season. (See Tayler, Jon, "Can Trea Turner save the steal?," Sports Illustrated, May 15, 2017.)) while driving home first baseman Adam Lind.

The Nationals' next three-game series against the Los Angeles Dodgers followed the same pattern, with the Dodgers shutting out the Nationals 7−0 in the September 15 game behind a dominant turn by starting pitcher Alex Wood and then winning the September 16 game before the Nationals captured the last game of the set on September 17. In the latter game, Strasburg's streak of innings without allowing a run ended at 35 as a flyball by Logan Forsythe bounced off the heel of the center fielder Taylor's glove for what was ruled an RBI double in the second inning, but that was the only run the Nationals gave up as Strasburg earned the 7−1 win, buoyed by a two-homer performance by Zimmerman to equal the first baseman's career best in a season with 33 home runs. Embarking on their last road trip of the season, the Nationals won back-to-back games for the first time since clinching as they topped the Braves at SunTrust Park 4−2 behind a strong seven-inning start from Scherzer, as the Nationals ace became just the fourth pitcher in major league history to post four consecutive seasons with 250 or more strikeouts. In the game, Turner swiped two bases to set a new Nationals record for stolen bases in a season with 42. (Note: The previous record was held by Alfonso Soriano, who stole 41 bases in 159 games played in the 2006 season, his only year with the Nationals. Turner, who lost almost two months of his 2017 season with a wrist injury, needed 88 games to tie and pass Soriano for the stolen base record. (See Janes, Chelsea, "Max Scherzer's seven strong innings lift Nationals over Braves, 4-2," The Washington Post, September 19, 2017.)) The Nationals ultimately took two of three from the Braves, dropping the last game of the series on September 21, although the veteran Zimmerman set a new personal best for a single season in home runs as he hit his 34th off Atlanta starter R. A. Dickey.

With Zimmerman out for the weekend with what Baker described as "general soreness", Lind hit his 199th and 200th career home runs over the first two games of a series visiting the New York Mets at Citi Field, on September 22 and September 23. The latter blast, off Mets pitcher Matt Harvey, set a new season high for the franchise in home runs with 204. The Nationals lost a five-run lead and dropped the September 22 game 7−6, with veteran reliever Shawn Kelley leaving the game midway through an at-bat against Mets outfielder Juan Lagares with an apparent arm injury, but came back from a three-run deficit to clip the Mets 4−3 in the tenth inning on September 23, with second baseman and former Met Daniel Murphy hitting a leadoff homer against reliever Jacob Rhame to put Washington on top and give reliever Sammy Solis his first decision of the year, a win. Behind a quality start by Scherzer, key hits from their catcher José Lobatón and shortstop Turner, and spectacular outfield defense from their right fielder Robles, the Nationals captured the rubber game of the series in Queens 3−2 to clinch home field advantage in the National League Division Series.

Starting for the Nationals to begin a three-game series on the road against the Phillies on September 25, Cole notched his first career hit, a single up the middle off Phillies ace Aaron Nola. Cole outdueled Nola to earn the win in the 3−1 contest. The next day, the Nationals activated star right fielder Bryce Harper from the disabled list after he missed more than a month with a hyperextended right knee and strained calf. The Nationals lost the September 26 and September 27 games to the Phillies before heading back to Washington, D.C., for a four-game homestand to end the regular season against the Pittsburgh Pirates. Closer Sean Doolittle suffered his first blown save as a National since being acquired in trade from the Oakland Athletics in July, giving up a single to Andrew McCutchen and then a home run to Josh Bell on his first two pitches of the ninth inning on September 28. However, the Nationals rallied in the bottom of the ninth inning after the Pirates had tied it, with Rendon leading off with a single that was consecutively followed by singles from Murphy and then De Aza, whose sharp line drive down the right field line brought home Rendon to complete a 5−4 walk-off victory. Strasburg made his final start of the regular season on September 29, leading the Nationals to a 6−1 win with 7 2/3 shutout innings of no-hit ball to earn his 15th win of the year, joining Scherzer and Gio González among Nationals pitchers with that many. Strasburg also passed the 200-strikeout mark, making him and Scherzer the only pair of pitchers in team history with at least 200 strikeouts in a season. (Note: The only other pair in the history of the Montreal−Washington franchise to record 200 or more strikeouts apiece in a season to that point was the duo of Pedro Martínez and Jeff Fassero in the 1996 Montreal Expos season. (See "Stephen Strasburg reached 200 strikeouts on the season Friday night," espn.com, September 29, 2017.)) Zimmerman turned in one of the best offensive performances of his career, notching four extra-base hits for the first time in a game as he doubled twice and homered twice. On September 30, the Nationals announced Kelley had been diagnosed with bone chips in his right elbow and placed him on the 60-day disabled list. Infielder Stephen Drew, out since late July, was activated from the 60-day disabled list. In the last game of the month on September 30, Scherzer had to leave his start after 3 1/3 innings with what the team later announced was a hamstring cramp. Cole came on in long relief and fired 3 2/3 hitless innings, preserving Scherzer's one-hitter, before Romero came on for the eighth inning and worked around a walk. Kintzler, inserted to vie for his 30th career save, could not hold the 1−0 lead in the top of the ninth inning and gave up four runs on four hits to take the loss.

The Nationals wrapped up their final full month of the regular season with a 97–64 record, 20 games up on the second-place Marlins. After dropping three in a four-game series against the Brewers that began in August and continued into the first three days of September, they swept the Marlins in three games on the road, took three of four from the Phillies at home, suffered a rare series loss to the Braves at home as the visitors won two of three, dropped two of three to the visiting Dodgers, returned the favor in Atlanta by winning two of three there, again won two of three against the Mets in Queens, lost two of three to the Phillies in their last road series of the season, and finished the month having taken two of three from the Pirates in their last homestand of the season with one game left to play. They went 16–13 in September, their second-lowest winning percentage of the season for a full month.

=== October ===
The Nationals dropped their last game of the season to earn a series split with the Pittsburgh Pirates on October 1. Starter Gio González took the loss, with Tanner Roark appearing in relief and allowing more damage before Pittsburgh eventually won the game 11−8. While manager Dusty Baker said González had been dealing with illness before the game, González told a MASN reporter, "I didn't want him to say that at all. That's not an excuse." Left fielder Jayson Werth, expected to reach free agency after the season, was removed on defense in the ninth inning and received a standing ovation from the fans at Nationals Park. The game lasted 4 hours 22 minutes, the longest nine-inning game in both Nationals and Pirates history.

The Nationals finished the regular season 20 games ahead of the second-place Miami Marlins with a record of 97–65. It was both the second-best record in Nationals history and the second-best in Montreal-Washington franchise history, exceeded in both cases only by the 98–64 record of the 2012 Nationals.

On October 6, shortly before the start of the National League Division Series, the Nationals announced assistant hitting coach Jacque Jones had been suspended without pay amid an internal investigation.

=== Notable transactions ===
- April 9, 2017: The Nationals designated right-handed pitcher Jeremy Guthrie for assignment; he elected free agency.
- April 21, 2017: The Nationals designated infielder Grant Green for assignment and outrighted him to the minor leagues.
- May 13, 2017: The Nationals signed outfielder Bryce Harper to a one-year contract extension.
- May 26, 2017: The Nationals acquired minor league outfielder Ryan Raburn from the Chicago White Sox for minor league pitcher Mick VanVossen.
- June 5, 2017: The Nationals designated right-handed pitcher Rafael Martin for assignment and outrighted him to the minor leagues.
- June 14, 2017: The Nationals signed outfielder Alejandro De Aza to a minor league deal.
- June 15, 2017: The Nationals signed right-handed pitcher Edwin Jackson to a minor league deal.
- June 27, 2017: The Nationals signed right-handed pitcher Francisco Rodriguez to a minor league deal.
- June 29, 2017: The Nationals signed right-handed pitcher Kevin Jepsen to a minor league deal.
- July 1, 2017: The Nationals designated right-handed pitcher Jacob Turner for assignment and outrighted him to the minor leagues.
- July 16, 2017: The Nationals acquired left-handed pitcher Sean Doolittle and right-handed pitcher Ryan Madson from the Oakland Athletics for right-handed pitcher Blake Treinen and minor league players Jesus Luzardo and Sheldon Neuse.
- July 18, 2017: The Nationals designated right-handed pitcher Jacob Turner for assignment and outrighted him to the minor leagues.
- July 28, 2017: The Nationals acquired infielder/outfielder Howie Kendrick and cash considerations from the Philadelphia Phillies for minor league player McKenzie Mills and international bonus money.
- July 29, 2017: The Nationals released infielder Matt Skole.
- July 30, 2017: The Nationals released outfielder Chris Heisey.
- July 31, 2017: The Nationals acquired right-handed pitcher Brandon Kintzler from the Minnesota Twins for minor league player Tyler J. Watson and international bonus money; right-handed pitcher Jimmy Cordero was designated for assignment and outrighted to the minor leagues to clear space on the roster.
- August 1, 2017: The Nationals signed right-handed pitcher Esmil Rogers to a minor league deal.

=== Major league debuts ===
- Austin L. Adams (July 15, 2017)
- Rafael Bautista (April 30, 2017)
- Erick Fedde (July 30, 2017)
- Raudy Read (September 3, 2017)
- Víctor Robles (September 7, 2017)
- Adrián Sánchez (June 30, 2017)
- Andrew Stevenson (June 23, 2017)

=== Culture and entertainment ===
==== Mascots ====
During the 2016-2017 offseason, the Nationals announced that Racing Presidents Calvin Coolidge ("Cal"), Herbert Hoover ("Herbie"), and William Howard Taft ("Bill") had retired permanently to Florida, where they would compete against one another in races held during the fourth inning of Nationals spring training games at The Ballpark of the Palm Beaches in West Palm Beach. Taft had raced at Nationals Park from 2013 through 2016, while the other two retired presidents had raced there for one season each – Coolidge in 2015 and Hoover in 2016 – as part of a multiyear marketing partnership between the Nationals and the White House Historical Association. As a result of Taft's retirement and the Nationals′ decision not to add Franklin Delano Roosevelt as a Racing President in 2017, the Presidents Race at Nationals Park reverted in 2017 to its original format of 2006 through 2012, with competition between only four presidents: George Washington ("George"), Thomas Jefferson ("Tom"), Abraham Lincoln ("Abe"), and Theodore Roosevelt ("Teddy").

==== New organ ====
Late in the regular season, while the Nationals were on their final road trip of the year between September 19 and 27, a new organ was installed at Nationals Park, fulfilling the Nationals organization's long-held goal of upgrading the stadium's organ. The Viscount Sonus 60, priced at $20,000 on European Web sites, was manufactured in Mondaino, Italy, and tuned in Harrisburg, Pennsylvania. It was installed in a former radio booth on the second floor of the stadium's press box, replacing a less-capable portable Hammond organ that had been located in a corner of the stadium's sound effects control room. The new location gave the organist a private room for the first time, as well as a better view of the field and crowd.

=== Attendance ===
The Nationals drew 2,524,980 fans at Nationals Park during 2017, their fourth-highest attendance since arriving in Washington in 2005. It placed them seventh in attendance for the season among the 15 National League teams for the second consecutive year. Their highest attendance at a home game occurred on April 3, when they drew an Opening Day crowd of 42,744 for a game against the Miami Marlins, while the low mark was 18,881 for a game against the Seattle Mariners on May 25. Their average home attendance was 31,172 per game, fifth-highest since their arrival in Washington.

=== Game log ===
Legend
	Nationals win
	Nationals loss
	Postponement
**Bold**	Nationals team member

2017 game log: 97–65 (Home: 47–34; Away: 50–31)
April: 17–8 (Home: 7–5; Away: 10–3)

#	Date	Opponent	Score	Win	Loss	Save	Attendance	Record
1	April 3	Marlins	4–2	**Strasburg** (1–0)	Phelps (0–1)	**Treinen** (1)	42,744	1–0
2	April 5	Marlins	6–4	**Roark** (1–0)	Straily (0–1)	**Treinen** (2)	22,715	2–0
3	April 6	Marlins	3–4 (10)	Phelps (1–1)	**Blanton** (0–1)	Ramos (1)	19,418	2–1
4	April 7	@ Phillies	7–6	**Scherzer** (1–0)	Velasquez (0–1)	**Treinen** (3)	45,121	3–1
5	April 8	@ Phillies	3–17	Nola (1–0)	**Guthrie** (0–1)	—	37,241	3–2
6	April 9	@ Phillies	3–4	Gómez (1–0)	**Glover** (0–1)	—	36,917	3–3
7	April 10	Cardinals	14–6	**Roark** (2–0)	Wainwright (0–2)	—	27,413	4–3
8	April 11	Cardinals	8–3	**González** (1–0)	Lynn (0–1)	—	30,663	5–3
9	April 12	Cardinals	1–6	Leake (1–1)	**Scherzer** (1–1)	—	31,647	5–4
10	April 14	Phillies	3–2 (10)	**Kelley** (1–0)	Gómez (1–1)	—	38,664	6–4
11	April 15	Phillies	2–4	Hellickson (2–0)	**Blanton** (0–2)	Benoit (1)	35,626	6–5
12	April 16	Phillies	6–4	**Kelley** (2–0)	Benoit (0–1)	—	29,774	7–5
13	April 18	@ Braves	3–1	**Scherzer** (2–1)	Foltynewicz (0–2)	**Kelley** (1)	21,834	8–5
14	April 19	@ Braves	14–4	**Ross** (1–0)	Teherán (1–1)	—	22,101	9–5
15	April 20	@ Braves	3–2	**Strasburg** (2–0)	Dickey (1–2)	**Kelley** (2)	27,498	10–5
16	April 21	@ Mets	4–3 (11)	**Romero** (1–0)	Smoker (0–1)	**Kelley** (3)	34,773	11–5
17	April 22	@ Mets	3–1	**González** (2–0)	DeGrom (0–1)	**Glover** (1)	42,145	12–5
18	April 23	@ Mets	6–3	**Scherzer** (3–1)	Wheeler (1–2)	**Glover** (2)	27,044	13–5
19	April 24	@ Rockies	4–8	Estévez (2–0)	**Romero** (1–1)	—	23,019	13–6
20	April 25	@ Rockies	15–12	**Romero** (2–1)	Márquez (0–1)	—	21,340	14–6
21	April 26	@ Rockies	11–4	**Roark** (3–0)	Chatwood (2–3)	—	22,461	15–6
22	April 27	@ Rockies	16–5	**González** (3–0)	Senzatela (3–1)	—	34,929	16–6
23	April 28	Mets	5–7	DeGrom (1–1)	**Scherzer** (3–2)	Edgin (1)	34,562	16–7
24	April 29	Mets	3–5	Robles (4–0)	**Strasburg** (2–1)	Familia (1)	36,501	16–8
25	April 30	Mets	23–5	**Albers** (1–0)	Syndergaard (1–2)	–	36,806	17–8

May: 16–11 (Home: 9–4; Away: 7–7)

#	Date	Opponent	Score	Win	Loss	Save	Attendance	Record
26	May 2	Diamondbacks	3–6	McFarland (1–0)	**Roark** (3–1)	Rodney (7)	22,826	17–9
27	May 3	Diamondbacks	2–1	**Turner** (1–0)	Ray (2–2)	—	23,816	18–9
28	May 4	Diamondbacks	4–2	**Scherzer** (4–2)	Shipley (0–1)	**Romero** (1)	29,496	19–9
29	May 5	@ Phillies	4–2	**Strasburg** (3–1)	Pivetta (0–2)	**Albers** (1)	20,237	20–9
30	May 6	@ Phillies	6–2	**Cole** (1–0)	Velasquez (2–3)	—	21,298	21–9
31	May 7	@ Phillies	5–6 (10)	Neris (1–1)	**Treinen** (0–1)	—	30,464	21–10
32	May 8	@ Orioles	4–6	Gausman (2–3)	**González** (3–1)	Brach (8)	23,525	21–11
33	May 9	@ Orioles	4–5 (12)	Verrett (2–0)	**Turner** (1–1)	—	26,348	21–12
34	May 10	Orioles	7–6	**Albers** (2–0)	Brach (0–1)	–	32,984	22–12
	May 11	Orioles	Postponed (rain); Rescheduled for June 8.					
	May 12	Phillies	Postponed (rain); Rescheduled for May 14 as part of a doubleheader.					
35	May 13	Phillies	6–4	**Kelley** (3–0)	Ramos (0–3)	–	31,473	23–12
36	May 14 (1)	Phillies	3–4	Benoit (1–2)	**Kelley** (3–1)	Neris (4)	31,738	23–13
37	May 14 (2)	Phillies	6–5	**Turner** (2–1)	Neshek (0–1)	**Albers** (2)	30,137	24–13
38	May 16	@ Pirates	8–4	**Strasburg** (4–1)	Kuhl (1–4)	—	16,992	25–13
39	May 17	@ Pirates	1–6	Cole (2–4)	**Turner** (2–2)	—	18,803	25–14
40	May 18	@ Pirates	4–10	Glasnow (2–3)	**Roark** (3–2)	—	27,728	25–15
41	May 19	@ Braves	4–7	Vizcaíno (2–1)	**Romero** (2–2)	Johnson (7)	35,369	25–16
42	May 20	@ Braves	2–5	Krol (1–1)	**Scherzer** (4–3)	Johnson (8)	37,347	25–17
43	May 21	@ Braves	3–2	**Strasburg** (5–1)	García (4–3)	**Glover** (3)	32,895	26–17
44	May 23	Mariners	10–1	**Ross** (2–0)	Bergman (1–2)	—	29,650	27–17
45	May 24	Mariners	5–1	**Roark** (4–2)	Gaviglio (0–1)	—	29,223	28–17
46	May 25	Mariners	2–4	Miranda (4–2)	**Turner** (2–3)	Díaz (8)	18,881	28–18
47	May 26	Padres	5–1	**Scherzer** (5–3)	Perdomo (0–2)	**Glover** (4)	28,606	29–18
48	May 27	Padres	3–0	**Strasburg** (6–1)	Richard (3–6)	**Glover** (5)	37,357	30–18
49	May 28	Padres	3–5	Yates (1–0)	**Ross** (2–1)	Maurer (6)	30,243	30–19
50	May 29	@ Giants	3–0	**Roark** (5–2)	Moore (2–6)	**Glover** (6)	41,969	31–19
51	May 30	@ Giants	6–3	**González** (4–1)	Samardzija (1–7)	**Glover** (7)	41,266	32–19
52	May 31	@ Giants	3–1	**Scherzer** (6–3)	Cain (3–4)	—	41,371	33–19

June: 14–14 (Home: 6–8; Away: 8–6)

#	Date	Opponent	Score	Win	Loss	Save	Attendance	Record
53	June 2	@ Athletics	13–3	**Strasburg** (7–1)	Triggs (5–5)	—	20,813	34–19
54	June 3	@ Athletics	4–10	Hendricks (2–0)	**Ross** (2–2)	—	23,921	34–20
55	June 4	@ Athletics	11–10	**Roark** (6–2)	Madson (1–4)	**Kelley** (4)	21,265	35–20
56	June 5	@ Dodgers	4–2	**González** (5–1)	Ryu (2–6)	**Pérez** (1)	46,289	36–20
57	June 6	@ Dodgers	2–1	**Scherzer** (7–3)	McCarthy (5–3)	**Glover** (8)	44,250	37–20
58	June 7	@ Dodgers	1–2	Kershaw (8–2)	**Strasburg** (7–2)	Jansen (10)	43,230	37–21
59	June 8	Orioles	6–1	**Ross** (3–2)	Asher (2–4)	—	37,833	38–21
60	June 9	Rangers	2–5	Cashner (3–5)	**Roark** (6–3)	Bush (7)	38,332	38–22
61	June 10	Rangers	3–6 (11)	Kela (3–1)	**Kelley** (3–2)	—	32,157	38–23
62	June 11	Rangers	1–5	Bibens-Dirkx (2–0)	**Scherzer** (7–4)	—	32,027	38–24
63	June 12	Braves	10–11	Motte (1–0)	**Albers** (2–1)	Johnson (13)	28,909	38–25
64	June 13	Braves	10–5	**Gott** (1–0)	Dickey (4–5)	—	31,762	39–25
65	June 14	Braves	2–13	Teherán (6–4)	**Roark** (6–4)	—	36,227	39–26
66	June 15	@ Mets	8–3	**González** (6–1)	Gsellman (5–4)	—	30,319	40–26
67	June 16	@ Mets	7–2	**Scherzer** (8–4)	Matz (1–1)	—	37,119	41–26
68	June 17	@ Mets	7–4	**Strasburg** (8–2)	Lugo (1–1)	**Romero** (2)	38,059	42–26
69	June 18	@ Mets	1–5	deGrom (6–3)	**Ross** (3–3)	—	40,459	42–27
70	June 19	@ Marlins	7–8	Ramos (2–3)	**Romero** (2–3)	—	20,224	42–28
71	June 20	@ Marlins	12–3	**González** (7–1)	Vólquez (3–8)	—	20,868	43–28
72	June 21	@ Marlins	1–2	Barraclough (3–1)	**Scherzer** (8–5)	Ramos (10)	22,659	43–29
73	June 23	Reds	6–5 (10)	**Albers** (3–1)	Iglesias (2–2)	—	36,347	44–29
74	June 24	Reds	18–3	**Ross** (4–3)	Bailey (0–1)	—	40,139	45–29
75	June 25	Reds	2–6	Feldman (6–5)	**Roark** (6–5)	—	35,387	45–30
76	June 26	Cubs	4–5	Butler (4–2)	**González** (7–2)	—	29,651	45–31
77	June 27	Cubs	6–1	**Scherzer** (9–5)	Arrieta (7–6)	—	31,202	46–31
78	June 28	Cubs	8–4	**Strasburg** (9–2)	Lackey (5–9)	—	31,072	47–31
79	June 29	Cubs	4–5	Peña (1–0)	**Treinen** (0–2)	Davis (16)	37,097	47–32
80	June 30	@ Cardinals	1–8	Leake (6–6)	**Roark** (6–6)	—	41,398	47–33

July: 16–8 (Home: 7–5; Away: 9–3)

#	Date	Opponent	Score	Win	Loss	Save	Attendance	Record
81	July 1	@ Cardinals	1–2	Wacha (5–3)	**González** (7–3)	Bowman (1)	43,614	47–34
82	July 2	@ Cardinals	7–2	**Scherzer** (10–5)	Martínez (6–7)	—	43,640	48–34
83	July 3	Mets	3–2	**Albers** (4–1)	Sewald (0–3)	—	41,681	49–34
84	July 4	Mets	11–4	**Ross** (5–3)	Lugo (3–2)	—	37,120	50–34
—	July 5	Mets	Postponed (inclement weather); Rescheduled for August 27 as part of a doubleheader.					
85	July 6	Braves	2–5	Foltynewicz (7–5)	**González** (7–4)	Johnson (19)	22,724	50–35
86	July 7	Braves	5–4 (10)	**Albers** (5–1)	Krol (1–2)	—	32,664	51–35
87	July 8	Braves	0–13	Teheran (7–6)	**Strasburg** (9–3)	—	38,439	51–36
88	July 9	Braves	10–5	**Grace** (1–0)	Newcomb (1–4)	—	35,030	52–36
**All–Star Break (July 10–13)**
89	July 14	@ Reds	5–0	**González** (8–4)	Adleman (5–7)	**Grace** (1)	28,916	53–36
90	July 15	@ Reds	10–7	**Scherzer** (11–5)	Castillo (1–2)	**Grace** (2)	36,462	54–36
91	July 16	@ Reds	14–4	**Roark** (7–6)	Bailey (2–3)	—	25,712	55–36
92	July 17	@ Reds	6–1	**Strasburg** (10–3)	Feldman (7–7)	—	17,574	56–36
93	July 18	@ Angels	4–3	**Jackson** (1–0)	Bedrosian (2–2)	**Doolittle** (4)	43,345	57–36
94	July 19	@ Angels	0–7	Meyer (4–5)	**Gonzalez** (8–5)	—	41,065	57–37
95	July 21	@ Diamondbacks	5–6	Rodney (4–3)	**Romero** (2–4)	—	37,858	57–38
96	July 22	@ Diamondbacks	4–3	**Roark** (8–6)	Banda (0–1)	**Doolittle** (5)	39,176	58–38
97	July 23	@ Diamondbacks	6–2	**Blanton** (1–2)	Ray (9–5)	—	32,720	59–38
98	July 25	Brewers	0–8	Davies (12–4)	**Jackson** (1–1)	—	28,428	59–39
99	July 26	Brewers	8–5	**Madson** (3–4)	Barnes (3–2)	—	35,296	60–39
100	July 27	Brewers	15–2	**Scherzer** (12–5)	Blazek (0–1)	—	32,118	61–39
—	July 28	Rockies	Postponed (inclement weather); Rescheduled for July 30 as part of a doubleheader.					
101	July 29	Rockies	2–4	Márquez (9–4)	**Roark** (8–7)	Holland (32)	33,989	61–40
102	July 30 (1)	Rockies	6–10	Freeland (11–7)	**Fedde** (0–1)	Holland (33)	33,248	61–41
103	July 30 (2)	Rockies	3–1	**Jackson** (2–1)	Gray (3–2)	**Doolittle** (6)	31,118	62–41
104	July 31	@ Marlins	1–0	**González** (9–5)	Ureña (9–5)	**Doolittle** (7)	18,962	63–41

August: 18–11 (Home: 11–5; Away: 7–6)

#	Date	Opponent	Score	Win	Loss	Save	Attendance	Record
105	August 1	@ Marlins	6–7	McGowan (7–1)	**Albers** (5–2)	Ziegler (1)	17,742	63–42
106	August 2	@ Marlins	0–7	Worley (1–2)	**Cole** (1–1)	—	17,890	63–43
107	August 4	@ Cubs	4–2	**Roark** (9–7)	Hendricks (4–4)	**Doolittle** (8)	41,396	64–43
108	August 5	@ Cubs	4–7	Lackey (9–9)	**Jackson** (2–2)	Davis (23)	41,857	64–44
109	August 6	@ Cubs	9–4	**Kintzler** (3–2)	Edwards Jr. (3–3)	—	41,047	65–44
110	August 7	Marlins	3–2	**Kintzler** (4–2)	García (0–2)	**Doolittle** (9)	21,799	66–44
111	August 8	Marlins	3–7	Worley (2–2)	**Cole** (1–2)	—	25,406	66–45
112	August 9	Marlins	10–1	**González** (10–5)	Conley (4–5)	—	25,951	67–45
113	August 10	Marlins	3–2	**Madson** (4–4)	Tazawa (1–2)	**Doolittle** (10)	23,904	68–45
—	August 11	Giants	Postponed (rain); Rescheduled for August 13 as part of a doubleheader.					
114	August 12	Giants	3–1	**Jackson** (3–2)	Samardzija (7–12)	**Doolittle** (11)	32,344	69–45
115	August 13 (1)	Giants	2–4	Stratton (1–2)	**Cole** (1–3)	Dyson (9)	30,866	69–46
116	August 13 (2)	Giants	6–2 (11)	**Albers** (6–2)	Suárez (0–2)	—	29,085	70–46
117	August 15	Angels	3–1	**González** (11–5)	Skaggs (1–3)	**Doolittle** (12)	32,355	71–46
118	August 16	Angels	2–3	Nolasco (6–12)	**Roark** (9–8)	Bedrosian (6)	30,307	71–47
119	August 17	@ Padres	2–1	**Jackson** (4–2)	Yates (2–4)	**Doolittle** (13)	22,097	72–47
120	August 18	@ Padres	7–1	**Blanton** (2–2)	Perdomo (6–8)	—	26,747	73–47
121	August 19	@ Padres	1–3	Wood (3–4)	**Strasburg** (10–4)	Hand (11)	31,590	73–48
122	August 20	@ Padres	4–1	**González** (12–5)	Lamet (7–5)	**Doolittle** (14)	29,292	74–48
123	August 22	@ Astros	4–3	**Roark** (10–8)	Morton (10–6)	**Doolittle** (15)	23,798	75–48
124	August 23	@ Astros	1–6	Fiers (8–8)	**Jackson** (4–3)	—	23,434	75–49
125	August 24	@ Astros	5–4 (11)	**Albers** (7–2)	Clippard (2–7)	**Solis** (1)	24,761	76–49
126	August 25	Mets	2–4	deGrom (14–7)	**Cole** (1–4)	Ramos (24)	34,036	76–50
127	August 26	Mets	9–4	**González** (13–5)	Gsellman (5–6)	—	36,761	77–50
128	August 27 (1)	Mets	5–6	Blevins (6–0)	**Blanton** (2–3)	Ramos (25)	31,904	77–51
129	August 27 (2)	Mets	5–4	**Roark** (11–8)	Robles (7–5)	**Doolittle** (16)	20,624	78–51
130	August 28	Marlins	11–2	**Scherzer** (13–5)	Ureña (12–6)	—	20,838	79–51
131	August 29	Marlins	8–3	**Jackson** (5–3)	Worley (2–4)	—	25,924	80–51
132	August 30	Marlins	4–0	**Strasburg** (11–4)	Conley (6–6)	—	25,019	81–51
133	August 31	@ Brewers	3–6	Davies (16–7)	**González** (13–6)	Knebel (31)	26,384	81–52

September/October: 16–13 (Home: 7–7; Away: 9–6)

#	Date	Opponent	Score	Win	Loss	Save	Attendance	Record
134	September 1	@ Brewers	0–1	Nelson (11–6)	**Roark** (11–9)	Knebel (32)	40,044	81–53
135	September 2	@ Brewers	3–2	**Madson** (5–4)	Hader (1–2)	**Doolittle** (17)	35,341	82–53
136	September 3	@ Brewers	2–7	Jeffress (3–2)	**Jackson** (5–4)	—	36,937	82–54
137	September 4	@ Marlins	7–2	**Cole** (2–4)	Conley (6–7)	—	17,349	83–54
138	September 5	@ Marlins	2–1	**Strasburg** (12–4)	Despaigne (0–3)	**Doolittle** (18)	15,364	84–54
139	September 6	@ Marlins	8–1	**González** (14–6)	Peters (0–1)	—	14,390	85–54
140	September 7	Phillies	4–3	**Roark** (12–9)	Morgan (3–2)	**Doolittle** (19)	26,267	86–54
141	September 8	Phillies	11–10	**Scherzer** (14–5)	Thompson (1–2)	**Doolittle** (20)	29,837	87–54
142	September 9	Phillies	4–5	Leiter (3–5)	**Jackson** (5–5)	Neris (20)	35,694	87–55
143	September 10	Phillies	3–2	**Strasburg** (13–4)	Lively (3–6)	**Madson** (2)	32,627	88–55
144	September 12	Braves	0–8	Teherán (11–11)	**González** (14–7)	—	22,769	88–56
145	September 13	Braves	2–8	Gohara (1–1)	**Scherzer** (14–6)	—	24,850	88–57
146	September 14	Braves	5–2	**Roark** (13–9)	Foltynewicz (10–13)	**Doolittle** (21)	25,192	89–57
147	September 15	Dodgers	0–7	Wood (15–3)	**Jackson** (5–6)	—	37,508	89–58
148	September 16	Dodgers	2–3	Hill (10–8)	**Cole** (2–5)	Jansen (38)	39,387	89–59
149	September 17	Dodgers	7–1	**Strasburg** (14–4)	Stripling (3–5)	—	29,155	90–59
150	September 19	@ Braves	4–2	**Scherzer** (15–6)	Gohara (1–2)	**Doolittle** (22)	26,709	91–59
151	September 20	@ Braves	7–3	**González** (15–7)	Ramírez (2–3)	—	25,054	92–59
152	September 21	@ Braves	2–3	Dickey (10–10)	**Roark** (13–10)	Vizcaíno (12)	32,702	92–60
153	September 22	@ Mets	6–7	Bradford (2–0)	**Blanton** (2–4)	Familia (4)	28,095	92–61
154	September 23	@ Mets	4–3 (10)	**Solis** (1–0)	Rhame (0–1)	**Doolittle** (23)	34,455	93–61
155	September 24	@ Mets	3–2	**Scherzer** (16–6)	deGrom (15–10)	**Kintzler** (29)	29,057	94–61
156	September 25	@ Phillies	3–1	**Cole** (3–5)	Nola (12–11)	**Doolittle** (24)	17,026	95–61
157	September 26	@ Phillies	1–4	Thompson (3–2)	**González** (15–8)	Neris (25)	16,437	95–62
158	September 27	@ Phillies	5–7	Ríos (1–0)	**Roark** (13–11)	Neris (26)	17,642	95–63
159	September 28	Pirates	5–4	**Doolittle** (2–0)	Hudson (2–7)	–	26,380	96–63
160	September 29	Pirates	6–1	**Strasburg** (15–4)	Cole (12–12)	–	36,339	97–63
161	September 30	Pirates	1–4	Kontos (1–6)	**Kintzler** (4–3)	Rivero (21)	32,240	97–64
162	October 1	Pirates	8–11	Sánchez (1–0)	**González** (15–9)	Kontos (1)	35,652	97–65

== Postseason ==
=== Game log ===
2017 postseason game log: 2–3 (Home: 1–2; Away: 1–1)
National League Division Series: 2–3 (Home: 1–2; Away: 1–1)

#	Date	Opponent	Score	Win	Loss	Save	Attendance	Series
1	October 6	Cubs	0–3	Hendricks (1–0)	Strasburg (0–1)	Davis (1)	43,898	0–1
2	October 7	Cubs	6–3	Pérez (1–0)	Edwards Jr. (0–1)	Doolittle (1)	43,860	1–1
3	October 9	@ Cubs	1–2	Edwards Jr. (1–1)	Kintzler (0–1)	Davis (2)	42,445	1–2
–	October 10	@ Cubs	Postponed (rain); Rescheduled for October 11.					
4	October 11	@ Cubs	5–0	Strasburg (1–1)	Arrieta (0–1)	—	42,264	2–2
5	October 12	Cubs	8–9	Duensing (1–0)	Scherzer (0–1)	Davis (3)	43,849	2–3

=== Division Series ===
With the National League's second seed in the 2017 postseason, the Nationals faced the third seed, the National League Central-champion Chicago Cubs, who, as the winners of the 2016 World Series, were mounting their first defense of a World Series title since 1908. On October 4, 2017, the Cubs announced that Kyle Hendricks would start Game 1 of the Division Series while Jon Lester would start Game 2, José Quintana Game 3, and Jake Arrieta Game 4. On October 5, Dusty Baker announced that Stephen Strasburg would start Game 1 for the Nationals, but did not specify starters for any other NLDS games. The Nationals later announced that Gio González would start Game 2 and Max Scherzer would start Game 3, giving Scherzer additional time to recover from a hamstring tweak he had suffered in his last start of the regular season on September 30. On October 8, Dusty Baker announced that Tanner Roark would start Game 4.

On October 6, Mayor of the District of Columbia Muriel Bowser and Mayor of Chicago Rahm Emanuel announced a friendly wager on the outcome of the series, with Bowser staking half-smokes from Ben's Chili Bowl and D.C. Brau beer against Emanuel's bet of sausage from Publican Quality Meats, prime bone-in ribeye steaks from Harry Caray's Italian Steakhouse, and two growlers of Vice District Brewing Company's Habitual beer. They also agreed that the losing mayor would make a monetary contribution to relief efforts in Puerto Rico in the aftermath of Hurricane Maria.

Just before Game 1 of the NLDS began on October 6, the Nationals announced the indefinite suspension with pay of assistant hitting coach Jacque Jones pending a team investigation of an unspecified legal matter, the first off-field problem Washington had faced all season. Minor-league hitting coordinator Troy Gingrich assumed assistant hitting coach duties in Jones's absence.

==== Game 1, October 6 ====
7:31 p.m. (EDT) at Nationals Park in Washington, D.C.

In pregame ceremonies at Nationals Park, U.S. Congressman Steve Scalise (R-La.), representing Louisiana′s 1st Congressional District, threw out the ceremonial first pitch on his 52nd birthday, with United States Capitol Police special agent Kevin Bailey catching. Both men had been shot on June 14, 2017, when a gunman opened fire on Republican U.S. senators and congressmen practicing at Eugene Simpson Stadium Park in Alexandria, Virginia, for the annual Congressional Baseball Game for Charity.

Game 1 was a pitcher's duel between the Nationals′ hard-throwing Stephen Strasburg, whose fastball reached 98 miles per hour (158 km/h), and Chicago's soft-tossing Kyle Hendricks, known for a fastball that topped out at 88 miles per hour (142 km/h) at best. Strasburg had a very strong outing, pitching a no-hitter through the first five innings, allowing only a single Cub to reach base when shortstop Addison Russell walked in the top of the second. In the top of the sixth inning, however, Nationals third baseman Anthony Rendon dropped Chicago second baseman Javier Báez′s routine chopper up the third-base line, Rendon's first error since July 22, allowing Báez to lead off the inning by reaching first base. Hendricks then advanced Báez to second on a sacrifice bunt, Báez becoming the first Cub to reach second base during the game. Right fielder Ben Zobrist followed by flying out to center field, pushing Strasburg's no-hitter to 5 2/3 innings, but in the next at-bat, third baseman Kris Bryant finally broke up the no-hit bid, singling to right, scoring Báez and advancing to second when right fielder Bryce Harper overthrew the cut-off man. First baseman Anthony Rizzo followed immediately with a single that scored Bryant. Catcher Willson Contreras grounded out to end the sixth inning, and Strasburg returned to pitch a perfect seventh inning, leaving the game after giving up only two hits, no earned runs, and one walk while striking out 10 Cubs, but with the Nationals behind 2–0. Strasburg's 10 strikeouts were a postseason single-game record for the Montreal-Washington franchise.

Meanwhile, Kendricks dominated the Nationals, taking advantage of a particularly effective changeup, and Washington hitters proved unable to adjust to his mid-80s fastball. He gave up a single to Harper in the first and a single to center fielder Michael A. Taylor in the second and, like Strasburg, left the game after the seventh inning, having shut out Washington on two hits (only one of which left the infield), three walks, a hit batsman, and six strikeouts. Other than Harper's single, he silenced the heart of the Nationals′ lineup; Anthony Rendon, first baseman Ryan Zimmerman, second baseman Daniel Murphy, shortstop Trea Turner, and left fielder Jayson Werth went a combined 0-for-17 against him.

In the eighth inning, the bullpens took over. In the top of the eighth. Nationals reliever Ryan Madson gave up doubles to pinch-hitter Jon Jay and Anthony Rizzo, allowing the Cubs to push their lead to 3–0. No one else reached base for either team, Carl Edwards Jr. pitching a perfect eighth for the Cubs, Brandon Kintzler a perfect ninth for the Nationals, and Wade Davis closing with a perfect ninth for the Cubs. With Washington managing only two hits – and none after the second inning – Chicago took a 1–0 lead in the series.

Friday, October 6, 2017 7:31 pm EDT at Nationals Park in Washington, D.C.
Team	1	2	3	4	5	6	7	8	9	R	H	E
Chicago	0	0	0	0	0	2	0	1	0	3	5	1
Washington	0	0	0	0	0	0	0	0	0	0	2	1
Starting pitchers: CHI: Kyle Hendricks (0–0); WAS: Stephen Strasburg (0–0); WP: Kyle Hendricks (1-0) LP: Stephen Strasburg (0-1) Sv: Wade Davis (1); Home runs: CHI: None; WAS: None; Attendance: 43,898

==== Game 2, October 7 ====
5:38 p.m. (EDT) at Nationals Park in Washington, D.C.

With Max Scherzer still completing his recovery from a hamstring tweak, Gio González started Game 2 for Washington, facing Chicago ace Jon Lester. Despite the impotence of the Nationals′ lineup against Cubs pitching the previous evening, Dusty Baker opted to put the same lineup up against Lester in the belief that it was capable of an offensive explosion at any time.

González got off to strong start, quickly retiring the Cubs in order in the top of the first with two strikeouts. With two outs in the bottom of the first, third baseman Anthony Rendon hit a solo home run into the Nationals′ bullpen in right field to give the Nats their first run and first lead of the series, but Cubs catcher Willson Contreras responded with a towering leadoff homer to left in the top of the second to tie the game at 1–1. González then kept the Cubs off the bases until the top of the fourth inning, when third baseman Kris Bryant led off with a double and first baseman Anthony Rizzo followed immediately with a two-run homer to right to give Chicago a 3–1 lead, becoming the Cubs' career leader in postseason homers (with six) and in postseason RBIs (with 16). González left the game after five innings, having given up three earned runs on three hits and two walks while striking out six Cubs.

After Rendon's first-inning homer, Lester retired the next ten Nationals batters. By the end of the fourth inning, the Nationals' No. 2 through No. 5 hitters — right fielder Bryce Harper, Rendon, second baseman Daniel Murphy, and first baseman Ryan Zimmerman — had combined for a 2-for-21 (.095) hitting performance in the series and Washington as a team had gone only 3-for-42 (.071). The Nats did not show another spark of offensive life until the bottom of the fifth inning, when Zimmerman led off with a single – only the second Washington hit of the game – stole second, and advanced to third on a wild pitch. Lester issued back-to-back walks to center fielder Michael A. Taylor and pinch hitter Howie Kendrick, batting for González, to load the bases with two outs, but the scoring threat evaporated when slumping shortstop Trea Turner, hitless in the series, struck out to end the inning.

In relief of González, Matt Albers, Sammy Solis, and Ryan Madson kept the Cubs from adding to their lead in the sixth, seventh, and eighth innings, giving up only a single and a walk and striking out a Cub, but against Lester, who pitched through the sixth inning and whose two-hit performance was the best postseason outing of his career, and Pedro Strop, who pitched the seventh for Chicago, the Nats managed only one base runner, when Strop hit catcher Matt Wieters with a pitch, the second time Wieters had been hit by a pitch in the series. Wieters did not advance beyond first. By the time the Nationals came to bat in the bottom of the eighth inning, they had accumulated only one run and four hits in the first 16 innings of the series, hitting 4-for-52 (.077). Losing 3–1 and with opportunities running out, they faced the prospect of traveling to Chicago for Game 3 down 2–0 in the best-of-five series with a badly slumping offense and needing to win three straight games, two of them on the road, to avoid elimination in the first round of the postseason for the fourth time in six years. After the game, Baker told the press that as the bottom of the eighth began, he was "kind of bewildered" by his team's offensive silence, adding "I just knew in the bottom of my heart that we were going to explode for some numbers, which we've done all year."

Carl Edwards Jr. came in to pitch for the Cubs in the bottom of the eighth, which began with pinch-hitter Adam Lind, a veteran who had played 1,344 regular-season games over 12 seasons, singling in the first postseason appearance of his career. Twenty-year-old Víctor Robles, who had just reached the major leagues for the first time on September 7, made his own career postseason debut when he came in to pinch-run for Lind. After Trea Turner struck out, Bryce Harper, 0-for-3 in the game with two groundouts and a strikeout and seemingly overmatched by Cubs pitching, came to the plate; he had just returned in late September from 42 days on the disabled list and since then had gone 4-for-25 (.160) in the regular season and postseason combined with no extra-base hits, but on a 3–1 pitch from Edwards he homered to right – the fifth home run of his 16-game postseason career – to tie the game at 3–3. Edwards then walked Rendon. Mike Montgomery relieved Edwards, but surrendered a single to Daniel Murphy which advanced Rendon to second. Zimmerman then came up to bat; he had hit only .167 against the Cubs during the regular season and his 1-for-6 performance in the division series had dropped his average against the Cubs in 2017 as a whole to .144, but he hit a three-run homer to left, giving the Nationals a 6–3 lead. After Montgomery retired the side, Nationals closer Sean Doolittle made his first appearance of the series, and gave up only a single in the top of the ninth on his way to earning the first postseason save of his career. The Nationals evened the series at 1–1.

Saturday, October 7, 2017 5:38 pm EDT at Nationals Park in Washington, D.C.
Team	1	2	3	4	5	6	7	8	9	R	H	E
Chicago	0	1	0	2	0	0	0	0	0	3	6	0
Washington	1	0	0	0	0	0	0	5	X	6	6	0
Starting pitchers: CHI: Jon Lester (0–0); WAS: Gio González (0–0); WP: Óliver Pérez (1–0) LP: Carl Edwards Jr. (0–1) Sv: Sean Doolittle (1); Home runs: CHI: Wilson Contreras, Anthony Rizzo; WAS: Anthony Rendon, Bryce Harper, Ryan Zimmerman; Attendance: 43,860

==== Game 3, October 9 ====
4:08 p.m. (EDT) at Wrigley Field in Chicago, Illinois

On Columbus Day, in the first postseason game at Wrigley Field since the 2016 World Series, Max Scherzer – returning from nursing a hamstring tweak he suffered in his final regular-season appearance – started for Washington, while José Quintana took the ball for Chicago in the first postseason start of his career. Both starters pitched masterful games. Quintana shut out the Nats through 5 2/3 innings, allowing only two hits, singles to left fielder Jayson Werth in the second inning and to center fielder Michael A. Taylor in the third, an inning in which Taylor reached third on throwing errors by Quintana and third baseman Ben Zobrist but did not score. Quintana benefited from better Cubs defense in the top of the fourth inning, when Werth walked and Nationals catcher Matt Wieters followed with a deep fly ball that center fielder Jon Jay grabbed with a spectacular running catch that probably saved a run. With two outs in the sixth, however, second basemen Daniel Murphy hit a fly ball into the left field corner that Cubs left fielder Kyle Schwarber mishandled, committing two errors that allowed Murphy to reach third base. Cubs manager Joe Maddon brought in Pedro Strop to relieve Quintana – who left having struck out seven Nats and walked only one – but Strop promptly surrendered a double to first baseman Ryan Zimmerman that brought Murphy home and gave the Nationals a 1–0 lead.

Scherzer did not allow a baserunner until the fourth inning, when he hit John Jay with a pitch, and threw a no-hitter for 6 1/3 innings – the deepest no-hit bid by an opponent in Cubs postseason history – and struck out seven Cubs before finally giving up a double to Zobrist with one out in the bottom of the seventh inning. With Scherzer having thrown 98 pitches, Dusty Baker came out to relieve him, choosing lefty Sammy Solis to face the left-handed Schwarber. Maddon countered by pinch-hitting for Schwarber, bringing right-hander Albert Almora Jr. to the plate. Solis, although he had posted a 5.88 ERA during the season, actually had fared better against right-handed batters than left-handers, but on Solis's seventh pitch, Almora singled – his first career postseason hit in 15 at-bats – to score Zobrist and tie the game at 1–1. Solis then gave up a single to right fielder Jason Heyward that advanced Almora to second before Brandon Kintzler relieved Solis and got shortstop Addison Russell to line out to Taylor in center field. Heyward made a rare baserunning mistake by attempting to advance to second on Russell's liner, allowing Taylor to double him off at first base to end the inning.

The decisive moment in the game came in the bottom of the eighth inning. Kintzler gave up a lead-off walk to Chicago pinch-hitter Tommy La Stella. Leonys Martin then came in to pinch run for La Stella and advanced to second on Jon Jay's sacrifice bunt. Kintzler then struck out third baseman Kris Bryant, and Baker brought in Óliver Pérez to pitch to first baseman Anthony Rizzo rather than walk Rizzo and face catcher Willson Contreras, who was waiting in the on-deck circle. Rizzo hit Perez's first pitch weakly into left field for a bloop single that fell between Taylor, Werth, and shortstop Trea Turner. The hit scored Martin to give the Cubs a 2–1 lead before Rizzo was thrown out to end the inning when he tried to advance to second. Chicago closer Wade Davis then retired the Nationals in order in the top of the ninth and Chicago secured a 2–1 victory despite committing four errors in the field. The Cubs took a 2–1 lead in the series even though they had hit only .179 as a team in the three games.

Outstanding starts by Stephen Strasburg in Game 1 and Scherzer in Game 3 both had resulted in losses thanks to Washington's slumping offense. Although they had scored five runs in the bottom of the eighth inning in Game 2, the Nationals ended Game 3 with a total of only seven hits and two runs in the other 26 innings of the series combined, hitting only .083 as team in those innings. Leadoff hitter Trea Turner finished Game 3 having gone 0-for-12 in the series with five strikeouts and had not reached base, while Anthony Rendon was 1-for-10 and Daniel Murphy, batting cleanup, was 1-for-11. While Nats pitchers had posted a combined 1.96 ERA in the 2017 NLDS, the team's overall .121 batting average in the series was the lowest of any 2017 playoff team.

Monday, October 9, 2017 4:08 pm EDT at Wrigley Field in Chicago, Illinois
Team	1	2	3	4	5	6	7	8	9	R	H	E
Washington	0	0	0	0	0	1	0	0	0	1	3	1
Chicago	0	0	0	0	0	0	1	1	X	2	4	4
Starting pitchers: WAS: Max Scherzer (0–0); CHI: José Quintana (0–0); WP: Carl Edwards Jr. (1–1) LP: Brandon Kintzler (0–1) Sv: Wade Davis (2); Home runs: WAS: none CHI: none Attendance: 42,445

==== Game 4, October 11 ====
4:08 p.m. (EDT) at Wrigley Field in Chicago, Illinois

Originally scheduled to begin at 5:38 p.m. EDT on October 10, Game 4 was postponed due to rain and rescheduled for 4:08 p.m. EDT on October 11. The Nationals had planned for Tanner Roark to start Game 4 on October 10, but Roark had struggled in his last two outings of the regular season and Washington, with a must-win situation in Game 4, considered taking advantage of the rainout to have the dominating Stephen Strasburg, who had posted an ERA of 0.76 in his last nine appearances, start instead on normal rest. However, the Nationals announced on the evening of October 10 after Game 4 had been postponed that Strasburg had come down with influenza-like symptoms after his October 6 appearance in Game 1 and was too ill to pitch Game 4, and that Roark would get the call on October 11, leading to much criticism by outside observers that Strasburg was perhaps too "soft" and too prone to health problems to pitch in the postseason. Plans changed again during the day on October 11 however, when Strasburg, after undergoing a regimen of antibiotics and intravenous fluids, told Nationals pitching coach Mike Maddux that he felt well enough to pitch. Ultimately, Strasburg started Game 4.

As they had in the NLDS in 2012 and 2014, the Nationals faced elimination in Game 4, which took place on a damp and chilly afternoon and evening with a strong breeze from Lake Michigan blowing in from the outfield, knocking down long fly balls for both teams that might have been home runs. Once, again, both teams enjoyed excellent outings by their starting pitchers. Although still recovering from his illness, Strasburg pitched an impressive seven shutout innings in which he threw 106 pitches, 72 of them for strikes, gave up only three hits and two walks, and struck out 12 Cubs, a new Montreal-Washington franchise postseason single-game strikeout record that broke the record Strasburg had set himself in Game 1 on October 6, when he had fanned 10 Cubs. The biggest Cubs scoring threat of his outing came in the bottom of the second inning, when Chicago third baseman Ben Zobrist doubled with one out, then tagged and advanced to third on shortstop Addison Russell's fly out. Strasburg then walked center fielder Jason Heyward, but got second baseman Javier Báez to ground out to end the inning without the Cubs scoring. He allowed only one more Cub to reach second base, when catcher Willson Contreras singled and advanced to second on a Strasburg throwing error in the bottom of the fourth inning, but he struck out the side to extinguish that threat as well. Strasburg left the game having struck out 22 Cubs in his two 2017 NLDS appearances, becoming only the third MLB pitcher in history to strike out ten or more batters twice in the same division series and the first National League pitcher to do it in any postseason series since Bob Gibson for the St. Louis Cardinals in the 1968 World Series. In his three career postseason playoff appearances combined - one in 2014 and two in 2017 - Strasburg had posted a 0.49 ERA over 19 innings, striking out 24 and issuing only four walks. In his last ten appearances of 2017 combined, including the two NLDS games, he had pitched to an ERA of 0.69.

For Chicago, starter Jake Arrieta, returning to action after suffering a hamstring injury, walked five Nats in four innings of work but allowed only two hits. He gave up only one run – unearned – when, in the top of the third inning, Washington shortstop Trea Turner, batting leadoff but 0-for-13 in the series, doubled with one out, reaching base for the first time in the NLDS, then advanced to third base on a wild pitch. Arrieta struck out left fielder Jayson Werth, then walked right fielder Bryce Harper, who stole second. After that, Cubs shortstop Addison Russell committed an error on Nationals first baseman Ryan Zimmerman′s slow roller, allowing Turner to score and giving Washington a 1–0 lead before Arrieta struck out second basemen Daniel Murphy to end the inning. He faced another major scoring threat in the top of the fourth, when Washington third baseman Anthony Rendon led off with a double, center fielder Michael A. Taylor walked, Strasburg executed a textbook sacrifice bunt to advance both runners, and Trea Turner walked to load the bases with two outs, but he struck out Werth again to end both the inning and his playoff outing, having struck out four Nats and allowed no earned runs. Jon Lester relieved Arrieta in the fifth and retired the first ten Nationals batters he faced, the last of them Bryce Harper, who led off the eighth inning and struck out. Ryan Zimmerman walked and attempted to rattle Lester – known for disliking throwing the ball to the bases – by taking long leads, but Lester uncharacteristically managed to pick him off first for the second out.

However, the eighth inning proved to be the decisive one for the third time in the four games of the series. After Lester gave up a single to Daniel Murphy – only Murphy's second hit of the series – Cubs manager Joe Maddon brought in Carl Edwards Jr. to relieve him. Edwards promptly walked Anthony Rendon and catcher Matt Wieters to load the bases and threw ball one to Michael A. Taylor. In an attempt to shut down the scoring threat, Maddon then opted to bring in closer Wade Davis early, but Taylor overcame the evening's strong winds to hit Davis's second pitch into the "basket" fencing along the railing in right-center field for a grand-slam home run – the first postseason grand slam in the history of the Montreal-Washington franchise – and give Washington a 5–0 lead. Davis then gave up a single to pinch-hitter Adam Lind and walked Trea Turner. Finally, Cubs reliever Brian Duensing came in to induce a groundout by pinch-hitter Howie Kendrick and end the Nationals' two-out rally.

Ryan Madson pitched the bottom of the eighth for Washington, giving up a walk and hitting a batter but allowing no hits or runs, and Nationals closer Sean Doolittle pitched a perfect ninth inning to preserve Washington's 5–0 victory, the first postseason win of Strasburg's career. The Nationals evened the series at 2–2 and forced a decisive Game 5 at Nationals Park the following evening.

During the game, Chicago had gone 0-for-6 with runners in scoring position, Cubs left fielder Kris Bryant had struck out four times, and Chicago first baseman Anthony Rizzo had fanned twice. The Cubs finished Game 4 hitting only .159 as a team in the 2017 NLDS. Although the Nationals emerged from the game hitting only .130 as a team through the first four games of the series, Michael A. Taylor had gone 3-for-11 with two walks in the 2017 NLDS, and his 2017 postseason average stood at a team-best .273.

October 11, 2017 4:08 pm EDT at Wrigley Field in Chicago, Illinois
Team	1	2	3	4	5	6	7	8	9	R	H	E
Washington	0	0	1	0	0	0	0	4	0	5	5	1
Chicago	0	0	0	0	0	0	0	0	0	0	3	2
Starting pitchers: WAS: Stephen Strasburg (0–1); CHC: Jake Arrieta (0–0); WP: Stephen Strasburg (1–1) LP: Jake Arrieta (0–1); Home runs: WAS: Michael A. Taylor; CHC: None; Attendance: 42,264

==== Game 5, October 12 ====
8:08 p.m. (EDT) at Nationals Park in Washington, D.C.

For the third time in their four playoff appearances, the Nationals hosted Game 5 of the NLDS at Nationals Park. It was the fifth anniversary of their collapse there in Game 5 of the 2012 National League Division Series. Former Nationals outfielder Michael Morse threw the ceremonial first pitch. He later led the crowd in singing his walk-up song during his time with the Nationals, A-ha′s "Take On Me", during the seventh-inning stretch.

Gio González started his second game of the series and had a rocky outing. Chicago's leadoff hitter, left fielder Jon Jay, doubled on his second pitch. He lost his grip on his third pitch, and Jay advanced to third base when it sailed to the backstop. With one out, Jay scored on a ground-out by first baseman Anthony Rizzo to give the Cubs a 1–0 lead. González walked two more Cubs before getting out of the inning without further damage. In the bottom of the inning, with Chicago pitcher Kyle Hendricks making his second start of the series, Nationals shortstop Trea Turner led off with a double and advanced to third on a line out by left fielder Jayson Werth, but was thrown out at home while trying to score on a ground-out by right fielder Bryce Harper, and the Cubs preserved their early lead.

González pitched a perfect second inning. In the bottom of the second, Washington second baseman Daniel Murphy homered to right on Cubs starter Kyle Hendricks′s first pitch to tie the game at 1–1. Third baseman Anthony Rendon followed with a single, then advanced to second when catcher Matt Wieters executed a perfect bunt single. Center fielder Michael A. Taylor then hit a three-run homer – his second consecutive home run in the series – to give Washington a 4–1 lead. After Hendricks got the first two outs of the inning, he gave up a double to Werth and the Cubs intentionally walked Harper, but Hendricks finally stopped the Nationals′ rally by striking out first baseman Ryan Zimmerman.

González had more trouble in the top of the third inning, giving up a leadoff double to Cubs third baseman Kris Bryant. He struck out Anthony Rizzo, but then loaded the bases by issuing consecutive walks to catcher Willson Contreras and center fielder Albert Almora Jr. Bryant scored and the other runners advanced when shortstop Addison Russell grounded into the second out, and González followed that with a wild pitch to right fielder Jason Heyward that allowed Russell to take third base and Contreras to score, reducing the Nationals′ lead to 4–3. González finally ended the inning – and his season – by striking Heyward out. Hendricks gave up a single to Wieters in the third inning but otherwise retired the Nationals, and Matt Albers came in to pitch a perfect top of the fourth inning for Washington. The Nats mounted a two-out scoring threat in the bottom of the fourth when Werth and Harper singled back-to-back, but Hendricks got first baseman Ryan Zimmerman to pop out to end the inning.

With Washington clinging to a 4–3 lead, Max Scherzer came in on short rest to pitch the top of the fifth inning for the Nationals – his first relief appearance since the 2013 American League Division Series, when he was with the Detroit Tigers – and quickly got two outs; Cubs officials in the stands later told the press that they were preparing for Scherzer to pitch three or four lockdown innings and preserve Washington's lead late into the game. Then the inning took a bizarre turn and descended into disaster for Washington. Scherzer gave up consecutive singles to Willson Contreras and pinch-hitter Ben Zobrist and a bases-clearing double to Addison Russell that gave the Cubs a 5–4 lead. The Nationals intentionally walked Jason Heyward, and then Scherzer struck out second baseman Javier Báez for what should have been the third out. However, the third strike got past Wieters, and Báez ran to first on the passed ball. Rather than hold the ball at home to prevent the Cubs from scoring, Wieters tried to throw out Báez at first, and his throw went into right field, allowing Russell to score, Heyward to advance to third, and Báez to reach second, and giving Chicago a 6–4 lead. Wieters asked the umpires to declare the ball dead and the play a strikeout on the grounds of offensive interference, claiming Báez's bat had hit him in the back of the head on the backswing – a contention confirmed by video evidence – but the umpires made a controversial ruling that even if the bat had struck Wieters, it did not interfere with the play and did not merit a ruling that the ball was dead, and they let the play stand. Next, Cubs pinch-hitter Tommy La Stella reached first base on a catcher's interference call against Wieters, loading the bases, and Scherzer followed that by hitting Jon Jay in the foot with a pitch, sending him to first and forcing in Heyward from third to increase Chicago's lead to 7–4. Kris Bryant returned to the plate as the tenth Cubs batter of the inning, and popped out on Scherzer's 28th pitch to bring the shocking inning to a close. After the game, Cubs manager Joe Maddon described the inning as "bizarro world," and Scherzer said, "I′m sure I′ve been in some crazy stuff before, but nothing like that." It was the first time in recorded MLB history, a total of some 2.73 million half-innings, that an intentional walk, a passed-ball strikeout, catcher's interference, and a hit batsman had ever occurred in a single half-inning.

In the top of the sixth inning, the Cubs extended their lead to 8–4 when Zobrist, now playing left field, walked and Russell doubled – the ball rolling to the left-field wall right past a sliding Jayson Werth, who lost it in the stadium's lights – to drive Zobrist in. In the bottom of the sixth, the Nationals began to battle back. After getting the first two outs, Chicago reliever Pedro Strop walked Jayson Werth. Mike Montgomery relieved Strop and promptly gave up a double to Bryce Harper that advanced Werth to third. Next, he walked Ryan Zimmerman on a wild pitch that allowed Werth to score – cutting Chicago's lead to 8–5 – and advanced Harper to third. Daniel Murphy followed with a double that scored Harper and advanced Zimmerman to third. After the Cubs intentionally walked third baseman Anthony Rendon, Montgomery finally got Wieters to end the inning by flying out with the Cubs leading 8–6.

The Cubs came back to extend their lead in the top of the seventh when, with Sammy Solis pitching and one out, pinch-hitter Kyle Schwarber singled, Jon Jay singled and advanced Schwarber to third and, after Ryan Madson relieved Solis, Schwarber scored on a Kris Bryant groundout to give Chicago a 9–6 advantage. In the bottom of the seventh, the Nats scored again. Cubs reliever Carl Edwards Jr. walked leadoff hitter Michael A. Taylor and, after José Quintana relieved Edwards and got the first out, Trea Turner singled, Werth walked to load the bases, and Harper scored Taylor from third with a sacrifice fly to cut the Cubs lead again, to 9–7.

After Madson retired all three Cubs he faced in the top of the eighth, the Nationals staged their final rally in the bottom of the inning. Joe Maddon had called in Cubs closer Wade Davis to get the last out of the seventh inning and kept him in to pitch the eighth and ninth in the hope that he would get a seven-out save, an unusually long outing for him. Davis started the eighth by walking Daniel Murphy and Anthony Rendon, but then got pinch-hitter Adam Lind to ground into a double play that advanced Murphy to third. Michael A. Taylor then singled to drive in Murphy and cut Chicago's lead to 9–8, and light-hitting catcher José Lobatón who had replaced Wieters in the game, singled, advancing Taylor to second. With Davis clearly tiring and the top of the Nationals′ order coming to bat, Washington's hopes rose that they could at least tie the game. Trea Turner came to the plate and had worked his at-bat to a 2–1 count when catcher Willson Contreras threw to first to pick off Lobatón. Lobatón was called safe, but the Cubs challenged the call and the video replay revealed that Lobatón's foot had lost contact with the bag for less than a second while Anthony Rizzo was applying the tag. Lobatón was ruled out, and the inning ended.

Nationals closer Sean Doolittle set the Cubs down in order in the top of the ninth, and Davis – completing his longest outing since 2012 – returned to retire Turner, Werth, and Harper in the bottom of the ninth, throwing 44 pitches in his outing, 10 more than he had thrown in any single appearance during the regular season. The season ended on a Harper strikeout on a full count. Despite going 1-for-11 with runners in scoring position and walking nine Nationals hitters, the Cubs won the 4-hour 37-minute game 9–8 and the series 3–2 and advanced to face the Los Angeles Dodgers in the 2017 National League Championship Series.

Although they had 23 baserunners in the game, 13 of whom they left on base, the Nationals' season ended with elimination in the NLDS, as in their previous three postseason appearances, and it was the third time that they had played Game 5 of an NLDS at home and lost, the only MLB team other than the Oakland Athletics to lose more than one NLDS Game 5 at home over the previous decade. The Nationals became only the second team in MLB history to draw at least nine walks and score at least eight runs in a postseason game and still lose, the only previous team to do it having been the 1997 Cleveland Indians in the 1997 World Series. It was the eighth time the Nationals had played a one-run game in their postseason history, and they had lost all eight. It was the tenth time in a row that a team managed by Dusty Baker had lost a postseason game in which it had a chance to advance to the next round of the playoffs. Summing up the Nationals′ evening in a postgame interview, Jayson Werth said, "It feels like everything that could go wrong, did...I can't believe we lost that game."

Game 5 of the NLDS was Baker's last as manager of the Nationals. On October 20, the Nationals announced that Baker, who was in the final year of his two-year contract in 2017, would not return in 2018.

During an interview with Chris Russo on SiriusXM′s Mad Dog Sports Radio on October 26, MLB Chief Baseball Officer Joe Torre, whose portfolio includes oversight of MLB umpiring, said that the umpires had made an incorrect call on Matt Wieters's passed ball during Baez's fifth-inning at-bat. Torre said that under Rule 6.03, Javier Báez should have been called for offensive interference and that calling the ball dead should have taken precedence, which would have ended the inning on a strikeout instead of allowing two Cubs runners to score on the passed ball and Wieters's subsequent throwing error in a game that Chicago won by one run. He added that Dusty Baker could have requested a rules review on the play, but did not, and therefore the umpires′ ruling stood.

October 12, 2017 8:08 pm EDT at Nationals Park in Washington, D.C.
Team	1	2	3	4	5	6	7	8	9	R	H	E
Chicago	1	0	2	0	4	1	1	0	0	9	9	0
Washington	0	4	0	0	0	2	1	1	0	8	14	2
Starting pitchers: CHC: Kyle Hendricks (1–0); WAS: Gio González (0-0); WP: Brian Duensing (1–0) LP: Max Scherzer (0–1) Sv: Wade Davis (3); Home runs: CHC: none WAS: Daniel Murphy, Michael A. Taylor; Attendance: 43,849

==== Composite line score ====
2017 NLDS (3–2): Chicago Cubs defeat Washington Nationals

Team	1	2	3	4	5	6	7	8	9	R	H	E
Chicago	1	1	2	2	4	3	2	2	0	17	27	7
Washington	1	4	1	0	0	3	1	10	0	20	30	5
Total attendance: 216,316 Average attendance: 43,263

==== Television ====
Broadcast on TBS, Game 5 of the 2017 NLDS earned a television rating of 14.0 in the Washington, D.C., market, making it the second-most-watched game in Montreal-Washington franchise history, exceeded only by the viewership five years earlier to the day for Game 5 of the 2012 National League Division Series between the Nationals and the St. Louis Cardinals. The telecast earned a 22.9 rating in the Chicago market.

=== Postseason rosters ===
Playoff rosters
National League Division Series

- Pitchers: 21 Brandon Kintzler 31 Max Scherzer 36 Sammy Solis 37 Stephen Strasburg 43 Matt Albers 44 Ryan Madson 46 Óliver Pérez 47 Gio González 57 Tanner Roark 62 Sean Doolittle 72 Enny Romero
- Catchers: 32 Matt Wieters 59 José Lobatón
- Infielders: 1 Wilmer Difo 6 Anthony Rendon 7 Trea Turner 11 Ryan Zimmerman 20 Daniel Murphy 26 Adam Lind
- Outfielders: 3 Michael A. Taylor 4 Howie Kendrick 8 Brian Goodwin 14 Víctor Robles 28 Jayson Werth 34 Bryce Harper

== Roster ==
2017 Washington Nationals
Roster
Pitchers: 70 Austin Adams; 43 Matt Albers; 56 Joe Blanton; 22 A. J. Cole; 62 Sean Doolittle; 23 Erick Fedde; 30 Koda Glover; 47 Gio González; 62 Trevor Gott; 33 Matt Grace; 18 Jeremy Guthrie; 40 Edwin Jackson; 27 Shawn Kelley; 21 Brandon Kintzler; 44 Ryan Madson; 46 Óliver Pérez; 57 Tanner Roark; 72 Enny Romero; 41 Joe Ross; 31 Max Scherzer; 36 Sammy Solis; 37 Stephen Strasburg; 45 Blake Treinen; 38 Jacob Turner	Catchers: 59 José Lobatón; 65 Raudy Read; 29 Pedro Severino; 32 Matt Wieters; Infielders: 1 Wilmer Difo; 10 Stephen Drew; 5 Grant Green; 26 Adam Lind; 20 Daniel Murphy; 6 Anthony Rendon; 5 Adrián Sánchez; 7 Trea Turner; 11 Ryan Zimmerman	Outfielders: 9 Rafael Bautista; 17 Alejandro De Aza; 2 Adam Eaton; 8 Brian Goodwin; 34 Bryce Harper; 14 Chris Heisey; 4 Howie Kendrick; 18 Ryan Raburn; 14 Víctor Robles; 45 Andrew Stevenson; 3 Michael Taylor; 28 Jayson Werth	Manager: 12 Dusty Baker; Coaches: 54 Dan Firova (bullpen); 13 Bob Henley (third base); 24 Jacque Jones (assistant hitting); 15 Davey Lopes (first base); 51 Mike Maddux (pitching); 39 Rick Schu (hitting); 35 Chris Speier (bench)

== Statistics ==
=== Regular season ===
==== Team leaders ====
Qualifying players only.

===== Batting =====
Stat	Player	Total
Avg.	Daniel Murphy	.322
HR	Ryan Zimmerman	36
RBI	Ryan Zimmerman	108
R	Bryce Harper	95
H	Daniel Murphy	172
SB	Trea Turner	46

===== Pitching =====
Stat	Player	Total
W	Max Scherzer	16
L	Tanner Roark	11
ERA	Max Scherzer	2.51
SO	Max Scherzer	268
SV	Sean Doolittle	21
IP	Gio González	201.0

==== Batting ====
Note: G = Games played; AB = At bats; R = Runs; H = Hits; 2B = Doubles; 3B = Triples; HR = Home runs; RBI = Runs batted in; AVG = Batting average; OBP = On base percentage; SLG = Slugging percentage; SB = Stolen bases

Complete regular-season offensive statistics are available here.

Player	G	AB	R	H	2B	3B	HR	RBI	AVG	OBP	SLG	SB
Matt Albers	63	0	0	0	0	0	0	0	—	—	—	0
Austin Adams	6	0	0	0	0	0	0	0	—	—	—	0
Rafael Bautista	17	25	2	4	0	0	0	0	.160	.222	.160	0
Joe Blanton	51	0	0	0	0	0	0	0	—	—	—	0
A. J. Cole	11	14	0	2	0	0	0	0	.143	.250	.143	0
Alejandro De Aza	28	62	8	12	2	3	0	9	.194	.224	.323	1
Wilmer Difo	124	332	47	90	10	4	5	21	.271	.319	.370	10
Sean Doolittle	30	0	0	0	0	0	0	0	—	—	—	0
Stephen Drew	46	95	9	24	7	0	1	17	.253	.302	.358	0
Adam Eaton	23	91	24	27	7	1	2	13	.297	.393	.462	3
Erick Fedde	3	4	0	0	0	0	0	0	.000	.000	.000	0
Koda Glover	23	0	0	0	0	0	0	0	—	—	—	0
Gio González	32	66	3	6	0	0	0	5	.091	.143	.091	0
Brian Goodwin	74	251	41	63	21	1	13	30	.251	.313	.498	6
Trevor Gott	4	0	0	0	0	0	0	0	—	—	—	0
Matt Grace	40	5	0	0	0	0	0	0	.000	.000	.000	0
Grant Green	2	3	0	0	0	0	0	0	.000	.000	.000	0
Jeremy Guthrie	1	0	0	0	0	0	0	0	—	—	—	0
Bryce Harper	111	420	95	134	27	1	29	87	.319	.413	.595	4
Chris Heisey	38	74	8	12	3	1	1	5	.162	.215	.270	0
Edwin Jackson	19	21	2	0	0	0	0	0	.095	.095	.095	0
Shawn Kelley	33	0	0	0	0	0	0	0	—	—	—	0
Howie Kendrick	52	164	24	48	8	2	7	25	.293	.343	.494	4
Brandon Kintzler	27	0	0	0	0	0	0	0	—	—	—	0
Adam Lind	116	267	39	81	14	0	14	59	.303	.362	.513	1
José Lobatón	51	141	11	24	3	0	4	11	.170	.248	.277	0
Ryan Madson	20	0	0	0	0	0	0	0	—	—	—	0
Daniel Murphy	144	534	94	172	43	3	23	93	.322	.384	.543	2
Óliver Pérez	50	0	0	0	0	0	0	0	—	—	—	0
Ryan Raburn	25	65	7	17	1	2	2	6	.262	.304	.431	0
Raudy Read	8	11	1	3	0	0	0	0	.273	.273	.273	0
Anthony Rendon	147	508	81	153	41	1	25	100	.301	.403	.533	7
Tanner Roark	32	55	1	5	1	0	0	0	.091	.107	.109	0
Víctor Robles	13	24	2	6	1	2	0	4	.250	.308	.458	0
Enny Romero	53	1	0	0	0	0	0	0	.000	.000	.000	0
Joe Ross	20	33	1	6	2	0	0	1	.182	.206	.242	0
Adrián Sánchez	34	71	6	19	7	0	0	11	.268	.288	.366	0
Max Scherzer	31	62	4	10	0	0	1	5	.161	.212	.210	0
Pedro Severino	17	29	0	5	1	0	0	3	.172	.226	.207	0
Sammy Solis	30	0	0	0	0	0	0	0	—	—	—	0
Andrew Stevenson	37	57	5	9	2	0	0	1	.158	.250	.193	1
Stephen Strasburg	28	54	5	7	0	0	2	3	.130	.161	.241	0
Michael A. Taylor	118	399	55	108	23	3	19	53	.271	.320	.486	17
Blake Treinen	37	0	0	0	0	0	0	0	—	—	—	0
Jacob Turner	18	5	0	0	0	0	0	0	.000	.167	.000	0
Trea Turner	98	412	75	117	24	6	11	45	.284	.381	.451	46
Jayson Werth	70	252	35	57	10	1	10	29	.226	.322	.393	7
Matt Wieters	123	422	43	95	20	0	10	52	.225	.288	.344	1
Ryan Zimmerman	144	524	90	159	33	0	36	108	.303	.358	.573	1
**Team totals**	**162**	**5553**	**819**	**1477**	**311**	**31**	**215**	**796**	**.266**	**.332**	**.449**	**108**

==== Pitching ====
Note: W = Wins; L = Losses; ERA = Earned run average; G = Games pitched; GS = Games started; SV = Saves; IP = Innings pitched; H = Hits allowed; R = Runs allowed; ER = Earned runs allowed; HR = Home runs allowed; BB = Walks allowed; K = Strikeouts

Complete regular-season pitching statistics are available here.

Player	W	L	ERA	G	GS	SV	IP	H	R	ER	HR	BB	K
Austin Adams	0	0	3.60	6	0	0	5.0	4	4	2	0	8	10
Matt Albers	7	2	1.62	63	0	2	61.0	35	12	11	6	17	63
Joe Blanton	2	4	5.68	51	0	0	44.1	53	29	28	10	13	39
A. J. Cole	3	5	3.81	11	8	0	52.0	51	23	22	8	27	44
Sean Doolittle	1	0	2.40	30	0	21	30.0	22	10	8	2	8	31
Erick Fedde	0	1	9.39	3	3	0	15.1	25	16	16	5	8	15
Koda Glover	0	1	5.12	23	0	8	19.1	20	11	11	1	4	17
Gio González	15	9	2.96	32	32	0	201.1	158	69	66	21	79	188
Trevor Gott	1	0	30.00	4	0	0	3.0	11	10	10	1	3	3
Matt Grace	1	0	4.32	40	1	2	50.0	50	25	24	3	18	31
Jeremy Guthrie	0	1	135.00	1	1	0	0.2	6	10	10	0	4	0
Edwin Jackson	5	6	5.07	13	13	0	71.0	75	46	40	18	25	58
Shawn Kelley	3	2	7.27	33	0	4	26.0	29	21	21	12	11	25
Brandon Kintzler	2	1	3.46	27	0	1	26.0	25	10	10	2	5	12
Ryan Madson	3	0	1.37	20	0	1	19.2	13	3	3	0	3	28
Óliver Pérez	0	0	4.64	50	0	1	33.0	32	17	17	4	12	39
Tanner Roark	13	11	4.67	32	30	0	181.1	178	105	94	23	64	166
Enny Romero	2	4	3.56	53	0	2	55.2	55	26	22	7	23	65
Joe Ross	5	3	5.01	13	13	0	73.2	88	44	41	16	20	68
Max Scherzer	16	6	2.51	31	31	0	200.2	126	62	56	22	55	268
Sammy Solis	1	0	5.88	30	0	1	26.0	22	17	17	4	13	28
Stephen Strasburg	15	4	2.52	28	28	0	175.1	131	55	49	13	47	204
Blake Treinen	0	2	5.73	37	0	3	37.2	48	24	24	3	13	32
Jacob Turner	2	3	5.08	18	2	0	39.0	43	23	22	8	15	23
**Team totals**	**97**	**65**	**3.88**	**162**	**162**	**46**	**1446.2**	**1300**	**672**	**623**	**189**	**495**	**1457**

=== Postseason ===
==== Batting ====
(Updated as of October 13, 2017)

Note: G = Games played; AB = At bats; R = Runs; H = Hits; 2B = Doubles; 3B = Triples; HR = Home runs; RBI = Runs batted in; BB = Walks; SO = Strikeouts; Avg. = Batting average; OBP = On base percentage; SLG = Slugging percentage; SB = Stolen bases

Complete postseason offensive statistics are available here.

Player	G	AB	R	H	2B	3B	HR	RBI	AVG	OBP	SLG	SB
Matt Albers	2	0	0	0	0	0	0	0	—	—	—	0
Wilmer Difo	1	1	0	0	0	0	0	0	.000	.000	.000	0
Sean Doolittle	3	0	0	0	0	0	0	0	—	—	—	0
Gio González	2	2	0	0	0	0	0	0	.000	.000	.000	0
Brian Goodwin	1	0	0	0	0	0	0	0	—	—	—	0
Bryce Harper	5	19	2	4	1	0	1	3	.211	.304	.421	1
Howie Kendrick	3	2	0	0	0	0	0	0	.000	.333	.000	0
Brandon Kintzler	3	0	0	0	0	0	0	0	—	—	—	0
Adam Lind	3	3	0	2	0	0	0	0	.667	.667	.667	0
José Lobatón	1	2	0	1	0	0	0	0	.500	.500	.500	0
Ryan Madson	4	0	0	0	0	0	0	0	—	—	—	0
Daniel Murphy	5	19	5	4	1	0	1	2	.211	.318	.421	0
Óliver Pérez	2	0	0	0	0	0	0	0	—	—	—	0
Anthony Rendon	5	17	4	3	1	0	1	1	.176	.364	.412	0
Tanner Roark	0	—	—	—	—	—	—	—	—	—	—	—
Víctor Robles	2	1	1	0	0	0	0	0	.000	.000	.000	0
Enny Romero	0	—	—	—	—	—	—	—	—	—	—	—
Max Scherzer	2	3	0	0	0	0	0	0	.000	.000	.000	0
Sammy Solis	3	0	0	0	0	0	0	0	—	—	—	0
Stephen Strasburg	2	4	0	0	0	0	0	0	.000	.000	.000	0
Michael A. Taylor	5	15	3	5	0	0	2	8	.333	.444	.733	0
Trea Turner	5	21	1	3	1	0	0	0	.143	.217	.190	1
Jayson Werth	5	18	2	3	1	0	0	0	.167	.318	.222	0
Matt Wieters	5	14	2	2	0	0	0	0	.143	.333	.143	0
Ryan Zimmerman	5	20	1	3	1	0	1	4	.150	.227	.350	1

==== Pitching ====
(Updated as of October 13, 2017.)

Players in bold are on the active roster.

Note: W = Wins; L = Losses; ERA = Earned run average; G = Games pitched; GS = Games started; SV = Saves; IP = Innings pitched; R = Runs allowed; ER = Earned runs allowed; HR = Home runs allowed; BB = Walks allowed; K = Strikeouts

Complete regular-season pitching statistics are available here.

Player	W	L	ERA	G	GS	SV	IP	H	R	ER	HR	BB	K
Matt Albers	0	0	0.00	2	0	0	2.1	1	0	0	0	1	0
Sean Doolittle	0	0	0.00	3	0	1	3.0	1	0	0	0	0	4
Gio González	0	0	6.75	2	2	0	8.0	6	6	6	2	6	11
Brandon Kintzler	0	1	5.40	3	0	0	3.1	1	2	2	0	2	2
Ryan Madson	0	0	2.25	4	0	0	4.0	3	1	1	0	2	4
Óliver Pérez	1	0	0.00	2	0	0	1.0	0	0	0	0	0	0
Tanner Roark	—	—	—	0	—	—	—	—	—	—	—	—	—
Enny Romero	—	—	—	0	—	—	—	—	—	—	—	—	—
Max Scherzer	0	1	3.68	2	1	0	7.1	4	5	3	0	4	8
Sammy Solis	0	0	9.00	3	0	0	1.0	4	1	1	0	0	1
Stephen Strasburg	1	1	0.00	2	2	0	14.0	6	2	0	0	3	22

== Awards and honors ==
=== All-Stars ===
First baseman Ryan Zimmerman, second baseman Daniel Murphy, and right fielder Bryce Harper were voted onto the National League All-Star roster as starting position players, while starting pitchers Max Scherzer and Stephen Strasburg were also selected to the team. For Zimmerman and Murphy, it was their first time being voted in as starters, while it was Harper's fourth start and fifth overall selection. Murphy was also an All-Star in 2016, although he was not a starter, and Zimmerman was an All-Star in 2009. Scherzer was named an All-Star for the fifth consecutive year. Strasburg was named to the All-Star team for the third overall time. Harper was the top overall vote-getter from the National League. Future National Brandon Kintzler, closer for the Minnesota Twins before being traded to Washington at the end of July, was also selected to the American League All-Star team.

Scherzer started the All-Star Game at Marlins Park for the National League on July 11, allowing a single and striking out two, including Home Run Derby champion Aaron Judge, in one inning of work. Harper started in right field and went 1-for-1 with a walk, while making a diving catch on defense to rob American League catcher Salvador Pérez in the second inning. Murphy, the starting second baseman, went 1-for-2, grounding out in his second at-bat with the bases loaded to waste the National League's best chance of the evening to take the lead. Zimmerman went 0-for-2 while hitting into two double plays, one on a groundball and one on a flyout to center field. Kintzler pitched a perfect fifth inning for the American League. Strasburg did not appear in the game, an eventual 2–1 victory for the American League in 10 innings.

=== Annual awards ===
==== Players Choice Awards ====
- Max Scherzer, National League Outstanding Pitcher
- Ryan Zimmerman, National League Comeback Player

On November 8, two Nationals received Players Choice Awards. Max Scherzer received the award for National League Outstanding Pitcher; he led the National League in strikeouts with 268 in 2017 and posted a 16–6 record, a 2.09 FIP, and a 2.51 ERA. The 33-year-old Ryan Zimmerman received the National League Comeback Player Award for overcoming shoulder, wrist, thumb, foot, hamstring, and oblique injuries that had plagued him for several seasons to hit .303, with a .358 on-base percentage, a .573 slugging percentage, 36 home runs, and 108 RBIs; he also was selected as the starting first baseman for the National League team in the 2017 Major League Baseball All-Star Game, his first All-Star Game selection since 2009.

==== Silver Slugger ====
- Daniel Murphy, 2B

On November 9, Daniel Murphy was named the winner of the 2017 Silver Slugger Award as the best offensive second baseman in the National League. It was his second consecutive Silver Slugger Award and the 13th earned by a Nationals player since the team's arrival in Washington for the 2005 season. Despite battling a knee injury for at least part of the 2017 season, Murphy led National League second basemen in FanGraphs Wins Above Replacement with 4.3, the fourth-best in Major League Baseball in 2017. He posted a .928 on-base-plus-slugging (OPS) percentage, which was the best by a National League second basemen and more than 130 points higher than the next-best OPS among them. His .322 batting average also was the best among National League second basemen, and was second among all National League players, exceeded only by the .331 average posted by Colorado Rockies outfielder Charlie Blackmon. It was the sixth season in a row, and the eighth time in nine seasons, that at least one National won a Silver Slugger

==== Cy Young Award ====
On November 15, Max Scherzer was named the winner of the 2017 National League Cy Young Award, receiving 27 out of 30 first-place votes. It was his second consecutive Cy Young Award, his second as a National, and the third of his career. Already the sixth pitcher to win the award in both leagues, having won the American League Cy Young in 2013 with the Detroit Tigers, he became the tenth pitcher to win at least three Cy Youngs. Pitching at least 200 innings for the fifth straight season despite battling more injuries than he had experienced during his first two years as a National in 2015 and 2016 – between 2010 and 2017, only seven Major League Baseball pitchers compiled more 200-or-more-inning seasons – Scherzer led the National League with 268 strikeouts and posted a National League second-best 2.51 ERA and 12.02 strikeouts per nine innings. He led Major League Baseball with a .178 batting average against.

Clayton Kershaw of the Los Angeles Dodgers came in second in the Cy Young Award voting and received the remaining three first-place votes, but Stephen Strasburg came in third. Strasburg put up a 2.52 ERA, third-best in the National League, and also was third-best in the league in batting average against. He led the National League in fielding independent pitching (FIP), and over a five-game stretch in August and September he set a Nationals record by pitching 35 consecutive scoreless innings.

== Farm system ==
Level	Team	League	Manager
AAA	Syracuse Chiefs	International League	Billy Gardner Jr.
AA	Harrisburg Senators	Eastern League	Matthew LeCroy
A-Advanced	Potomac Nationals	Carolina League	Tripp Keister
A	Hagerstown Suns	South Atlantic League	Patrick Anderson
A-Short Season	Auburn Doubledays	New York–Penn League	Jerad Head
Rookie	GCL Nationals	Gulf Coast League	Josh Johnson
Rookie	DSL Nationals	Dominican Summer League	

=== New York Mets purchase of the Syracuse Chiefs ===
While the Nationals were playing in the 2017 National League Division Series, the chief operating officer of the New York Mets, Jeff Wilpon, joined Governor of New York Andrew Cuomo and the County Executive of Onondaga County, New York, Joanie Mahoney, at NBT Bank Stadium in Syracuse, New York, on October 11 to announce that the Mets would purchase the Syracuse Chiefs from the Community Baseball Club of Central New York. Under the deal, the Community Baseball Club of Central New York's ownership of the Chiefs and the Chiefs′ affiliation with the Washington Nationals – which had begun in 2009 – continued through the end of the 2018 season, after which the Mets would take ownership of and operate the Chiefs, with Syracuse – renamed the Syracuse Mets in October 2018 – becoming the Mets′ Class AAA affiliate beginning with the 2019 season.

== See also ==
- List of Major League Baseball home run records
- List of Major League Baseball pitchers who have thrown an immaculate inning
- List of Major League Baseball players to hit for the cycle
- List of Major League Baseball single-game hits leaders
- List of Major League Baseball single-game runs batted in leaders
