= 2016 Washington Nationals season =

2016 Washington Nationals
- National League East champions
- League: National League
- Division: East
- Ballpark: Nationals Park
- City: Washington, D.C.
- Record: 95–67 (.586)
- Divisional place: 1st
- Owners: Lerner Enterprises
- General managers: Mike Rizzo
- Managers: Dusty Baker
- Television: MASN; WUSA (CBS affiliate) (Bob Carpenter, FP Santangelo, Johnny Holliday, Ray Knight)
- Radio: WJFK 106.7 FM; Washington Nationals Radio Network (Charlie Slowes, Dave Jageler)

The 2016 Washington Nationals season was the Nationals' 12th season as the baseball franchise of Major League Baseball in the District of Columbia, the ninth season at Nationals Park, and the 48th since the original team was started in Montreal, Quebec, Canada. They won the National League East title for the third time in five years, posting a 95–67 record, and were upset by the Los Angeles Dodgers in five games in the NLDS.

== Offseason ==
=== Team news ===
Less than 24 hours after the end of the 2015 season, manager Matt Williams and his entire coaching staff were dismissed. Some coaches were offered other positions in the organization, with bench coach Randy Knorr notably accepting a position as senior assistant to general manager Mike Rizzo for player development.

The Nationals embarked on a wide-ranging search to replace Williams, who was still owed salary for 2016 after being fired midway through a multi-year contract. Among the candidates they interviewed were former Cincinnati Reds manager Dusty Baker, former San Diego Padres manager Bud Black, former Minnesota Twins manager Ron Gardenhire, Los Angeles Dodgers bench coach Tim Wallach, Arizona Diamondbacks third base coach Andy Green, San Francisco Giants bench coach Ron Wotus, former Nationals player Alex Cora, and Triple-A Reno Aces manager Phil Nevin. From the group, Baker and Black emerged as finalists and received second interviews. On October 28, The Washington Post reported Black would likely be hired as manager. But according to reports that surfaced late on November 2 from, among others, the Post, CBS Sports, and USA Today, while Black was offered the job and accepted, a disagreement over contract terms led to negotiations between the Nationals and Black breaking down. The Nationals' initial offer to Black was reportedly one year guaranteed at $1.6 million, an offer Black considered a "lowball". Unable to come to terms with Black, the Nationals' front office turned to its other leading choice, the more experienced Baker. Early on November 3, the Nationals announced Baker had been hired to a two-year contract as manager.

Baker and management set to work immediately on hiring new coaches. Mike Maddux was announced as the Nationals' new pitching coach on November 4. Davey Lopes was hired back to his former position as first base coach – a position he held in 2006 – the following day. Rick Schu and Bob Henley were also rehired as hitting coach and third base coach respectively, positions they held under Williams as well. The Nationals also hired former major league outfielder Jacque Jones to be Schu's assistant hitting coach and named former Montreal Expos shortstop Chris Speier as bench coach. Mexican League manager and coach Dan Firova was brought on as bullpen coach.

The Nationals also faced several decisions about what to do with players set to reach free agency, as well as players who had 2016 options. On November 2, the team announced it would decline options for right-handed reliever Casey Janssen and outfielder Nate McLouth, after Janssen struggled with injury and poor performance during the 2015 season and McLouth spent the entire year on the 60-day disabled list. Janssen and McLouth joined utility infielder Emmanuel Burriss, shortstop Ian Desmond, starter-turned-reliever Doug Fister, outfielder Reed Johnson, center fielder Denard Span, left-handed reliever Matt Thornton, second baseman Dan Uggla, and starting pitcher Jordan Zimmermann in a sizable free agent class. Qualifying offers worth $15.8 million apiece were extended to Desmond and Zimmermann, although both rejected them, as expected. Right-handed reliever David Carpenter also elected free agency after being outrighted from the Nationals' 40-man roster on November 18, 2015. On December 2, 2015, the Nationals announced they had not tendered a contract to right-handed reliever Craig Stammen, who was eligible for arbitration.

The Nationals bid for contracts with multiple top free agents during the off-season, including Yoenis Céspedes, Jason Heyward, Darren O'Day, Justin Upton, and Ben Zobrist, but lost out on them to other teams.

=== Transactions ===
- On November 16, 2015, the Nationals re-signed outfielder Reed Johnson and signed left-handed relief pitcher Sean Burnett to minor league deals with invitations to spring training.
- On November 17, 2015, the Nationals signed outfielder Logan Schafer to a minor league deal with an invitation to spring training.
- On November 21, 2015, the Nationals re-signed infielder Scott Sizemore and signed outfielder Chris Heisey to minor league deals with invitations to spring training.
- On December 10, 2015, the Nationals traded infielder Yunel Escobar and cash considerations to the Los Angeles Angels of Anaheim for right-handed relief pitcher Trevor Gott and right-handed minor league starting pitcher Michael Brady.
- On December 11, 2015, the Nationals signed left-handed relief pitcher Óliver Pérez and right-handed relief pitcher Shawn Kelley.
- On December 14, 2015, the Nationals signed right-handed relief pitcher Yusmeiro Petit, as well as right-handed relief pitcher Nick Masset, who accepted a minor league deal with an invitation to spring training.
- On December 18, 2015, the Nationals signed left-handed relief pitcher Aaron Laffey to a minor league deal with an invitation to spring training.
- On December 23, 2015, the Nationals signed catcher Jhonatan Solano to a minor league deal with an invitation to spring training.
- On January 6, 2016, the Nationals signed infielders Daniel Murphy and Stephen Drew. Minor league relievers Erik Davis and Taylor Hill were designated for assignment to clear space for Murphy and Drew on the 40-man roster and outrighted to Triple-A Syracuse, with invitations to spring training.
- On January 8, 2016, the Nationals traded right-handed relief pitcher Drew Storen to the Toronto Blue Jays for outfielder Ben Revere and a player to be named later.
- On January 26, 2016, the Nationals signed right-handed starting pitcher Bronson Arroyo to a minor league deal with an invitation to spring training.
- On February 2, 2016, the Nationals signed infielder Brendan Ryan to a minor league deal with an invitation to spring training.
- On February 17, 2016, the Nationals signed right-handed relief pitcher Matt Belisle to a minor league deal with an invitation to spring training.
- On February 18, 2016, the Nationals signed right-handed relief pitcher Burke Badenhop to a minor league deal with an invitation to spring training.
- On March 19, 2016, the Nationals released outfielder Logan Schafer from a minor league deal.
- On March 25, 2016, the Nationals outrighted first baseman Tyler Moore to Triple-A Syracuse. He was traded two days later to the Atlanta Braves for another minor league first baseman, Nate Freiman.
- On March 29, 2016, the Nationals selected the contract of minor league right-handed relief pitcher Matt Belisle and added him to the 40-man roster.
- On March 30, 2016, the Nationals released and resigned right-handed pitchers Bronson Arroyo and Burke Badenhop to minor league deals.
- On April 1, 2016, the Nationals selected the contract of minor league outfielder Chris Heisey and added him to the 40-man roster and released right-handed pitcher Burke Badenhop from a minor league deal.
- On April 3, 2016, the Nationals released left-handed relief pitcher Sean Burnett and outfielder Reed Johnson from minor league deals.

=== Spring training ===
On November 9, 2015, the Nationals and the Houston Astros held a groundbreaking ceremony for The Ballpark of the Palm Beaches, a new spring training facility they would share in West Palm Beach, Florida. The new facility, which would provide each team with two major-league-size practice fields, four minor-league-size practice fields, an agility field, a half field, batting cages, and pitching mounds, would center around a new baseball stadium with 6,400 ticketed seats and 1,250 berm seats, and would place the Nationals far closer to other teams during spring training, facilitating travel for spring training games. The new facility would open on February 28, 2017, just in time for the following season's first spring training game, and would be renamed The Fitteam Ballpark of the Palm Beaches in February 2018.

Meanwhile, the Nationals held their 2016 spring training in Viera, Florida, with home games played at Space Coast Stadium. It was their last spring training in Viera before moving to the new facility. The team's last game at Space Coast Stadium was a 7–2 victory over the Atlanta Braves on March 27, 2016. Its last scheduled game at Space Coast Stadium on March 28, 2016, was rained out, resulting in the cancellation of activities planned to commemorate the franchise's history there, which dated back to the 2003 season, when the franchise played as the Montreal Expos.

The Nationals finished spring training in Viera with the best record in baseball, winning 18 games, losing four, and tying in three. They outscored their opponents by 81 runs in total. After leaving Florida, the Nationals completed their spring training schedule with two exhibition games at Nationals Park at the beginning of April, a win and a tie against the Minnesota Twins. Including these two games, the Nationals completed their spring training schedule with a major-league-best record of 19–4–4.

== Regular season ==
=== Opening Day ===
The Washington Nationals opened the regular season on April 4 with an away game at Turner Field, facing the division rival Atlanta Braves. Max Scherzer was their Opening Day starter for the second year in a row.

The Nationals took an early lead when right fielder Bryce Harper hit a solo home run off Atlanta starting pitcher Julio Teherán in the top of the first inning, but the Braves quickly answered with a solo home run of their own off the bat of first baseman Freddie Freeman in the bottom of the first. In the fourth inning, Nationals second baseman Daniel Murphy led off with another home run off Teheran, but once again, the Braves came back in the bottom of the same inning as third baseman Adonis Garcia homered off Scherzer with no one on base, tying the game at 2–2.

The deadlock held until the bottom of the eighth inning, when Washington relief pitcher Felipe Rivero loaded the bases with two out. He was relieved by Shawn Kelley, who walked in Jeff Francoeur from third base on four straight balls to Garcia, putting the Braves on top. But once again, the game was tied in the next frame as left fielder Jayson Werth scored on a one-out sacrifice fly by Michael A. Taylor, who took over in center field after Ben Revere left the game early, off Braves closer Jason Grilli. Nationals reliever Blake Treinen pitched around a leadoff walk in the bottom of the ninth inning to force extra innings.

First baseman Ryan Zimmerman reached and took second base on a throwing error by Braves second baseman Gordon Beckham in the top of the tenth inning, and then Murphy brought him around to score with a double that reached the left field corner, putting the Nationals on top 4–3. Jonathan Papelbon came on to close out the game, retiring all three batters in order to pick up the save and secure an Opening Day win for Washington.

==== Opening Day lineup ====
Opening Day Starters
Name	Position
Ben Revere	Center field
Anthony Rendon	Third base
Bryce Harper	Right field
Ryan Zimmerman	First base
Daniel Murphy	Second base
Jayson Werth	Left field
Wilson Ramos	Catcher
Danny Espinosa	Shortstop
Max Scherzer	Pitcher

=== Season standings ===
==== National League East ====
NL East
Team	W	L	Pct.	GB	Home	Road
Washington Nationals	95	67	.586	—	50‍–‍31	45‍–‍36
New York Mets	87	75	.537	8	44‍–‍37	43‍–‍38
Miami Marlins	79	82	.491	15½	40‍–‍40	39‍–‍42
Philadelphia Phillies	71	91	.438	24	37‍–‍44	34‍–‍47
Atlanta Braves	68	93	.422	26½	31‍–‍50	37‍–‍43

==== National League Wild Card ====
Division leaders
Team	W	L	Pct.
Chicago Cubs	103	58	.640
Washington Nationals	95	67	.586
Los Angeles Dodgers	91	71	.562

Wild Card teams (Top 2 teams qualify for postseason)
Team	W	L	Pct.	GB
New York Mets	87	75	.537	—
San Francisco Giants	87	75	.537	—
St. Louis Cardinals	86	76	.531	1
Miami Marlins	79	82	.491	7½
Pittsburgh Pirates	78	83	.484	8½
Colorado Rockies	75	87	.463	12
Milwaukee Brewers	73	89	.451	14
Philadelphia Phillies	71	91	.438	16
Arizona Diamondbacks	69	93	.426	18
Atlanta Braves	68	93	.422	18½
San Diego Padres	68	94	.420	19
Cincinnati Reds	68	94	.420	19

=== Record vs. opponents ===
2016 National League record Source: MLB Standings Grid – 2016
Team	AZ	ATL	CHC	CIN	COL	LAD	MIA	MIL	NYM	PHI	PIT	SD	SF	STL	WSH	AL
Arizona	—	5–2	2–5	3–3	10–9	7–12	2–4	3–4	5–1	4–3	1–5	10–9	6–13	4–3	2–5	5–15
Atlanta	2–5	—	3–3	3–4	1–6	1–5	11–7	2–5	10–9	11–8	3–4	4–2	3–4	2–4	4–15	8–12
Chicago	5–2	3–3	—	15–4	2–4	4–3	4–3	11–8	2–5	5–1	14–4	4–2	4–3	10–9	5–2	15–5
Cincinnati	3–3	4–3	4–15	—	5–2	2–5	3–4	11–8	0–6	4–2	9–10	3–4	3–3	9–10	3–4	5–15
Colorado	9–10	6–1	4–2	2–5	—	7–12	2–5	1–5	6–1	2–5	2–5	10–9	9–10	2–4	4–2	9–11
Los Angeles	12–7	5–1	3–4	5–2	12–7	—	1–6	5–2	4–3	4–2	2–5	11–8	8–11	4–2	5–1	10–10
Miami	4–2	7–11	3–4	4–3	5–2	6–1	—	4–2	7–12	9–10	6–1	3–3	2–4	4–3	9–10	6–14
Milwaukee	4–3	5–2	8–11	8–11	5–1	2–5	2–4	—	2–5	3–4	9–10	3–4	1–5	6–13	4–2	11–9
New York	1–5	9–10	5–2	6–0	1–6	3–4	12–7	5–2	—	12–7	3–3	4–3	4–3	3–3	7–12	12–8
Philadelphia	3–4	8–11	1–5	2–4	5–2	2–4	10–9	4–3	7–12	—	3–4	5–2	3–3	2–5	5–14	11–9
Pittsburgh	5–1	4–3	4–14	10–9	5–2	5–2	1–6	10–9	3–3	4–3	—	3–3	4–3	9–10	2–4	9–11
San Diego	9–10	2–4	2–4	4–3	9–10	8–11	3–3	4–3	3–4	2–5	3–3	—	8–11	1–6	4–3	6–14
San Francisco	13–6	4–3	3–4	3–3	10–9	11–8	4–2	5–1	3–4	3–3	3–4	11–8	—	3–4	3–4	8–12
St. Louis	3–4	4–2	9–10	10–9	4–2	2–4	3–4	13–6	3–3	5–2	10–9	6–1	4–3	—	2–5	8–12
Washington	5–2	15–4	2–5	4–3	2–4	1–5	10–9	2–4	12–7	14–5	4–2	3–4	4–3	5–2	—	12–8

=== April ===
The Nationals got off to a fast start, sweeping the division rival Atlanta Braves in two series of six games total while riding out to a 9–1 win–loss mark, surpassing the start to the 1974 Montreal Expos season for the franchise best over the first 10 games of the season. Right fielder and reigning National League MVP Bryce Harper hit his 100th career home run, also his first career grand slam, off Atlanta pitcher Julio Teherán on April 14. He hit another grand slam off Miami Marlins pitcher Chris Narveson on April 19, amid a stretch in which the Nationals homered four times in one inning, another all-time high for the Montreal–Washington franchise; the four home runs included left fielder Jayson Werth's 200th career home run and the 201st home run of first baseman Ryan Zimmerman's career. In total, Harper cracked nine home runs in April, tied for second-most in the National League behind Colorado Rockies shortstop Trevor Story and third baseman Nolan Arenado, who hit 10 apiece. He also chalked up his first career pinch-hit home run, a game-tying solo blast in the ninth inning, off Minnesota Twins closer Kevin Jepsen on April 24. Harper was named the NL Player of the Month, the second time he received the honor.

Washington's pitching staff performed well over the course of the month, behind only the Chicago Cubs in team ERA. Closer Jonathan Papelbon, acquired in July 2015, more than doubled his save total with the Nationals (seven in 2015), notching eight saves during the month to one blown save against his former team, the Philadelphia Phillies. Starters Joe Ross and Stephen Strasburg were undefeated in games they started, with Ross credited with three wins—he left one other start on April 20 with a lead that was held by the bullpen, but the scorers awarded the win to long reliever Yusmeiro Petit since Ross exited the game early due to a finger blister—and Strasburg earning four. Reliever Óliver Pérez picked up the win in the Nationals' longest-ever regular season game, a 16-inning matchup with the Minnesota Twins at Nationals Park on April 24, after tying the game in the 15th with a bunt that was mishandled for a two-base throwing error by Twins catcher John Ryan Murphy and then pitching a shutout frame before right fielder Chris Heisey hit a solo home run for a walk-off win.

The Nationals struggled at times on offense, posting the third-worst batting average in the National League ahead of only the Braves and Milwaukee Brewers amid poor performances at the plate from center fielder Michael A. Taylor, left fielder Jayson Werth, and first baseman Ryan Zimmerman, despite strong hitting from Harper and second baseman Daniel Murphy, an off-season acquisition who hit in 12 straight games during the month and had 11 multi-hit games. The team also suffered injuries to regular players, with Ben Revere, acquired in the off-season to play center field, straining his oblique during his first at-bat of the season on April 4 and ending up on the disabled list, and reliever Matt Belisle, another off-season pickup, being placed on the disabled list after straining his calf while pitching on April 26. Outfielder Matt den Dekker and reliever Sammy Solis were called up from the Syracuse Chiefs, the Nationals' Class AAA International League affiliate, to replace them on the roster. Amid an offensive lull and the injury to Belisle, Washington was swept at home late in the month by the division rival Phillies for their first series loss of the year.

In total, the Nationals finished April with a 16–7 record, the second-best winning percentage in baseball behind the Cubs, and a half-game lead over the New York Mets, their closest rivals in the National League East.

=== May ===
On May 1, the Nationals completed their first-ever road sweep of the St. Louis Cardinals, with Max Scherzer earning the win. However, the Nationals were swept by the Chicago Cubs later on their Midwestern roadtrip in a four-game set. In the final game at Wrigley Field on May 8, Nationals right fielder Bryce Harper walked six times and was hit by a pitch, setting a major league record with seven plate appearances and zero official at-bats in a single game.

On May 9, as Stephen Strasburg pitched at Nationals Park in a game against the Detroit Tigers, news broke that he had agreed to a long-term extension of his contract; prior to the seven-year extension, Strasburg had been under team control for the final season in 2016 before he was due to become a free agent for the first time. Under the extension, signed and officially announced at a press conference at Nationals Park the following day and scheduled to begin in 2017, the Nationals agreed to pay Strasburg $175 million, structured so that Strasburg would receive $15 million a year through the end of the contract in 2023, and another $10 million a year in deferred salary between 2024 and 2030. The contract also included incentive bonuses for Strasburg and opt-outs for him after three years and after four years. The conventional wisdom among baseball analysts and journalists, and even among Strasburg's close associates, had long been that Strasburg would pursue free agency after the conclusion of the 2016 season and end up playing on a team in his native Southern California, and the contract extension therefore came as a major surprise, but Strasburg cited his comfort with living in the Washington, D.C., area, his appreciation for the Nationals having demonstrated concern for his health and professional future with their controversial decision to shut him down during the 2012 season in order to protect his elbow from overuse during his recovery from Tommy John surgery, and his belief that the Nationals had years of success coming in the future as important factors in his decision. The Nationals, Strasburg, and his agent Scott Boras soon revealed that the deal had been firmed up during the final week of April, but had been kept so quiet that even a day trip Strasburg made from St. Louis to Washington on April 30 to undergo a physical required before signing the contract while the Nationals were playing a road series against the St. Louis Cardinals went unnoticed by the baseball world and the press.

In the ninth inning of the May 9 game, which the Nationals won 5–4, Harper was ejected by home plate umpire Brian Knight after Knight took umbrage with the Nationals dugout's reaction to a called strike three on shortstop Danny Espinosa. Harper, clearly incensed by the ejection, ran onto the field with his teammates after pinch-hitter Clint Robinson hit a walk-off home run during the next at-bat, pointing at Knight and yelling, "Hey, fuck you," followed by a homophobic slur, before joining the celebration at home plate. Asked if he thought he would be fined for the outburst after the game, Harper replied, "If I do, I do. I'll pay it. ... Maybe he'll get fined, too." Harper was given a fine and a one-game suspension by Major League Baseball, which Harper served on May 14 after dropping an appeal of the decision.

In a 3–2 victory over the Tigers at Nationals Park on May 11, Max Scherzer struck out 20 in the course of pitching a six-hit complete game, tying the Major League Baseball record for strikeouts in a nine-inning game and becoming only the third player in Major League Baseball history to do so. Through six innings, he threw 77 pitches, 62 of which were strikes. He set a new Nationals Park record for strikeouts in single game when he struck out Detroit shortstop José Iglesias for his 16th strikeout, set a new personal record in the next at-bat when he struck out pinch-hitter Jarrod Saltalamacchia for his 17th, and in the at-bat after that he ended the inning by striking out second baseman Ian Kinsler for his 18th, tying the Montreal-Washington franchise's single-game record. Scherzer entered the ninth inning having thrown 106 pitches. He gave up a solo home run to right fielder J. D. Martinez on the first pitch of the inning, but in the next at-bat he struck out third baseman Miguel Cabrera to set a new Montreal-Washington franchise record with 19 strikeouts. After giving up a single to first baseman Víctor Martinez – the only Tiger who made a plate appearance that he did not strike out during the game – he struck out left fielder Justin Upton on three pitches for his 20th and final strikeout. It was only the fourth time in Major League Baseball history that a pitcher had struck out 20 batters in a nine-inning game, and only the sixth time a pitcher had struck out at least 20 batters in any game. Although Scherzer gave up more hits and more runs than any previous pitcher who had struck out 20 batters in nine innings, he did not issue any walks, and of the 119 pitches he threw, 96 were strikes, the first time a pitcher had thrown 96 strikes in a major-league game since 2013; taking into account both the number of strikes thrown and the ratio of strikes to balls, it was the greatest number of strikes thrown in the fewest pitches in Major League Baseball history.

On May 13, in a 5–3 victory over the Miami Marlins at Nationals Park, Stephen Drew and Chris Heisey both hit pinch-hit home runs. It was the first time in team history that the Nationals had two pinch-hit home runs in the same game. The two home runs made the Nationals second in Major League Baseball in pinch-hit home runs on the season with six in 35 games, three of them by Heisey. The Nats had had only five pinch-hit home runs during the entire previous season.

Between games of a doubleheader against the Marlins on May 14, the Nationals announced that they had exercised their two-year option on the contract of general manager Mike Rizzo, ensuring that Rizzo would remain with the club through the 2018 season. The option reportedly paid Rizzo $2.5 million annually.

The Nationals split series with the division rival New York Mets during the month, taking two out of three at Citi Field in Queens but dropping two out of three at Nationals Park. In both series, Mets starting pitcher Matt Harvey suffered a loss, leading to consternation in New York over the staff ace's decline in performance.

On May 26, Nationals manager Dusty Baker won his 1,700th game as a manager as the Nationals defeated the Cardinals at Nationals Park. Three days later, Strasburg improved to 9–0 for the season with a win over the Cardinals on May 29, setting a record for the Montreal–Washington franchise of 12 consecutive decisions won dating back to the 2015 season. Daniel Murphy, the Nationals' starting second baseman, tied a franchise record for hits in a month with 47, including seven home runs. Murphy was named the National League Player of the Month, the first time since 2009 that two teammates had received the honor in back-to-back months following Harper's award for April.

The Nationals finished with a 16–14 record on the month and a season win–loss mark of 32–21, with a two-game lead over the Mets in the National League East.

=== June ===
The Nationals started the month strong, despite losing two out of three in a series with the Cincinnati Reds at Great American Ball Park early in the month. They won series against the division rival Philadelphia Phillies, the Chicago White Sox in interleague play, and the National League-leading Chicago Cubs before embarking on a three-series roadtrip. Both the Phillies and Cubs series were capped by walk-off hits authored by left fielder Jayson Werth, who singled home Bryce Harper and Danny Espinosa to defeat the Phillies on June 12 and drove in Michael A. Taylor in an extra-innings victory over the Cubs on June 15.

Earlier in the Phillies series, in a 9–6 victory on June 10, Stephen Strasburg was credited with a win to go 10–0 on the season. He became the first National League pitcher to open a season at 10–0 since Juan Agosto did it for the Houston Astros in 1988 and the first National League starting pitcher to do it since Andy Hawkins started 11–0 for the San Diego Padres in 1985.

After their 9–4 start to the month, the Nationals visited the San Diego Padres and Los Angeles Dodgers in Southern California and then finished their roadtrip against the Milwaukee Brewers. Although the Nationals took the first two games of a four-game set from the Padres, they suffered a string of seven consecutive losses thereafter, splitting the series with the Padres, being swept by the Dodgers, and losing two of three to the Brewers. The losing streak was the Nationals' longest since their 2009 season, in which they finished with the worst record in Major League Baseball, 59–103.

Compounding the Nationals' late-June problems, Strasburg was placed on the disabled list with a back strain after missing two starts late in the month. Right-handed starting pitcher Lucas Giolito, the Nationals' top prospect and the #1-rated pitching prospect in all of baseball, was called up to replace him on the roster. Giolito made his first start June 28 against the New York Mets at Nationals Park, pitching four scoreless innings and allowing just one hit before a rainstorm delayed the game and prompted manager Dusty Baker to go to the bullpen when play resumed. The Nationals shut out the Mets 5–0, with the win awarded to Óliver Pérez in relief.

The June 28 win over the Mets was part of a string of five wins to end the Nationals' month. On June 30, Washington starter Gio González snapped a streak of six losing decisions with a 13–4 win over the Reds at Nationals Park. Espinosa, a switch-hitter, also became the first National to hit a home run while batting both left- and right-handed during the June 30 game.

The Nationals finished the month leading the National League East by six games over the Mets and six and a half games over the Miami Marlins. They posted a 16–11 win–loss record for June.

=== July ===
Stephen Strasburg was reactivated from the disabled list minutes before gametime on July 3 and proceeded to pitch 6 2/3 innings without allowing a hit to the Cincinnati Reds before manager Dusty Baker took him out of the game with a runner on third base and a pitch count in the triple digits. Strasburg earned the win in the 12–1 Nationals victory, raising his record to 11–0 and becoming only the fourth pitcher in the past 75 years with as good a win–loss mark through his first 15 starts. The Nationals hit six home runs in the game, their highest mark of the season.

The Nationals placed starting pitcher Joe Ross on the disabled list with shoulder inflammation on July 3 and first baseman Ryan Zimmerman on the disabled list on July 8 with a ribcage strain. Infielder/outfielder Trea Turner was called up on July 8 to take Zimmerman's place on the roster.

Pitching in his second start since returning from the disabled list on July 8, Strasburg picked up the win over the New York Mets in a 3–1 game to improve to 12–0 heading into the All-Star Break, becoming the first National League pitcher since Rube Marquard in 1912 to go 12–0 to start the season. The Nationals took three games out of four from the Mets in the series at Citi Field to head into the All-Star Break with a 54–36 record and a six-game lead over both the Mets and the Miami Marlins in the NL East.

Right-handed pitching prospect Reynaldo López was called up from the Class-AA Harrisburg Senators to make his major league debut with a start on July 19 against the Los Angeles Dodgers at Nationals Park. During the game, López gave up a lead-off home run to Chase Utley, allowed three runs in the first inning, and gave up hits to seven of the first 11 batters he faced. After that, he improved considerably, retiring eight batters in a row at one point, striking out six of them. After he allowed three batters to reach base and gave up two more runs in the fifth inning, he was relieved. He left the game having pitched 4 2/3 innings, throwing 105 pitches (65 for strikes), giving up six runs (all earned) on 10 hits (including one home run), and walking one but striking out nine. The Nationals lost the game 8–4, and he was the game's losing pitcher. His nine strikeouts was the second-highest strikeout total for a Nationals pitcher during a major league debut, exceeded only by Stephen Strasburg's 14 strikeouts on June 8, 2010. Although he ended up taking the loss in the game, López left the field to a standing ovation by fans. Also debuting against the Dodgers was Koda Glover, a relief pitcher drafted in 2015 who had been promoted all the way up to the Class-AAA Syracuse Chiefs. The right-hander threw a perfect inning in relief on July 20, needing just four pitches to get three outs and seal an 8–1 Nationals win.

The Dodgers handed Strasburg a loss, his first of the season, on July 21. The loss snapped a string of 16 winning decisions for the Nationals pitcher, who finished the month at 14–1 after recording a win over the Cleveland Indians, pitching seven scoreless innings in interleague play at Progressive Field, on July 27. Also during the series in Cleveland, Zimmerman was activated from the disabled list on July 26, with outfielder Michael A. Taylor being optioned to Syracuse to make room for him on the roster, while infielder Stephen Drew landed on the disabled list with vertigo-like symptoms and was replaced on the roster by Wilmer Difo, a Senators infielder, the following day. The Nationals also lost catcher José Lobatón to injury, as he was placed on the disabled list on July 29 with tendinitis in his left elbow. Pedro Severino was recalled from Syracuse to take Lobatón's place as the Nationals' backup catcher. Zimmerman was injured again just days after coming off the disabled list when he was hit on the wrist by a fastball thrown by San Francisco Giants closer Santiago Casilla on July 31.

The Nationals announced a trade with the Pittsburgh Pirates on July 30, swapping left-handed reliever Felipe Rivero and minor league pitcher Taylor Hearn to the Pirates in exchange for right-handed reliever Mark Melancon and cash considerations. The Washington Post reported that erstwhile closer Jonathan Papelbon had agreed to cede ninth-inning duties to Melancon and take up a different role out of the Nationals' bullpen.

July ended with consecutive split series for the Nationals on the road while visiting the Indians and the Giants, coming on the back of two straight series losses at the hands of the Dodgers and the San Diego Padres at home. The team went 7–8 after the All-Star Break to finish July with a 61–44 record and a four-game lead in the National League East over the Miami Marlins. Strasburg was honored as NL Pitcher of the Month, while infielder Daniel Murphy received his second NL Player of the Month award of the season for hitting .372 with 26 RBIs over 24 games in the month.

=== August ===
The Nationals set a year-to-date team record for hits and runs scored in a rout of the Arizona Diamondbacks at Chase Field in Phoenix on August 1. All nine Nationals starters had at least one hit, and all but starting pitcher Stephen Strasburg scored at least one run, in a 19-hit effort for the visitors, who defeated the Diamondbacks 14–1. Newly acquired closer Mark Melancon made his debut with the team, although it was not a save situation, and retired all three batters he faced. The Nationals ultimately swept the Diamondbacks on the road for the first time since the franchise moved to Washington, D.C., in 2005.

First baseman Ryan Zimmerman returned to the disabled list on August 6, having missed several games after being hit by a pitch on the wrist. Outfielder Brian Goodwin was called up to the major leagues for the first time to replace him on the Nationals' 25-man roster. He made his debut that evening, going 0-for-1 with a deep flyout to right field in a loss versus the San Francisco Giants at Nationals Park.

Melancon secured his first save as a National on August 7 over the Giants, improving his season record to 31-for-33 in save opportunities. Less than a week later, on August 13, the Nationals released reliever Jonathan Papelbon (whom Melancon had replaced as the team's closer) from his contract. Rookie starting pitcher Reynaldo López, who temporarily replaced Papelbon on the roster, earned his first major league win that day over the Atlanta Braves in a tight 7–6 game, giving up one run over seven innings pitched.

The Nationals placed left-handed reliever Sammy Solis and right-handed starting pitcher Stephen Strasburg on the disabled list during the month. Solis was placed on the disabled list with shoulder inflammation on August 17, and Koda Glover was called up to replace him. The rookie reliever notched his first career win on August 19, also against the Braves; Glover gave up the lead in the eighth inning on a two-run double by Freddie Freeman but was credited with the win after the Nationals scored in the top of the ninth and Melancon closed out the game. On August 22, Strasburg was placed on the disabled list with elbow soreness after a string of poor starts, and A. J. Cole was called up from the Class-AAA Syracuse Chiefs to replace him in the rotation.

Left fielder Jayson Werth tied the Montreal–Washington franchise record for consecutive games reaching base safely at 46, before the streak was snapped by the Braves on August 19. The streak had begun nearly two months prior, on June 20 against the Los Angeles Dodgers. During the streak, he tallied 43 hits and 32 walks. In another milestone for a Nationals player, second baseman Daniel Murphy hit his first career grand slam off Parker Bridwell in a 10–8 loss to the Baltimore Orioles on August 24.

The Nationals made another trade for a reliever after Oakland Athletics left-hander Marc Rzepczynski was waived by his ballclub. Oakland agreed to swap Rzepczynski and cash considerations to the Nationals in exchange for minor league second baseman Max Schrock. The two teams announced the deal on August 25. Rzepczynski made his Nationals debut on August 26, striking out Gerardo Parra of the Colorado Rockies before hitting Charlie Blackmon with a pitch, after which he was lifted from the game. The Nationals won the August 26 game 8–5, giving starting pitcher Gio González his 100th career win.

The Nationals closed out August by playing 20 games in 20 days without an off-day, a stretch over which they went 11–9, winning two series against the division rival Braves, dropping two series to the Rockies, losing a home-and-home series to the Orioles in interleague play, and finishing with a sweep of the division rival Philadelphia Phillies at Citizens Bank Park. They finished the month nine games ahead of the second-place New York Mets and 11 games ahead of the third-place Miami Marlins in the National League East, boasting a 78–55 win–loss record: the second-best in the NL, behind only the Chicago Cubs, and the third-best in the major leagues, behind the Cubs and Texas Rangers. After center fielder Trea Turner posted a .357 batting average and .571 slugging percentage for the month of August, he was named the NL Rookie of the Month.

=== September ===
After rosters expanded at the start of the month, the Nationals made their initial round of callups on September 2. The team recalled Syracuse Chiefs pitchers Trevor Gott, Matt Grace, and Rafael Martin, catcher Pedro Severino, and outfielder Brian Goodwin. They also purchased the contracts of Chiefs pitchers Sean Burnett and Mat Latos. Outfielder Matt den Dekker was designated for assignment and outrighted to Syracuse after clearing waivers. The Nationals also called up Chiefs pitcher Reynaldo López on September 4, followed by Chiefs pitcher Lucas Giolito and Harrisburg Senators infielder Wilmer Difo on September 6.

Rookie starting pitcher A. J. Cole got his first career win on September 2, outdueling Noah Syndergaard of the division rival New York Mets at Citi Field in a 4–1 contest. The Nationals went on to lose the series in Queens, dropping the next two games, but in the first game of their next homestand on September 5, they eliminated the rival Atlanta Braves, in last place in the National League East, from division contention by defeating them 6–4.

Right-hander Stephen Strasburg was activated from the disabled list to make a start on September 7 versus the Braves, but his return was short-lived, as he was lifted from the game in the third inning after experiencing discomfort while pitching. The team announced the next day that he had been diagnosed with a flexor mass strain and would miss an unspecified amount of time. Joe Ross also returned from the disabled list to make a start on September 18, with prospect Chris Bostick being designated for assignment to make room for him on the roster.

On September 6, third baseman Anthony Rendon hit his first career grand slam off Braves pitcher Williams Pérez, putting the Nationals on top in a game they went on to win 9–7. On September 9, rookie center fielder Trea Turner posted his first multi-homer game, hitting a two-run shot followed by a solo home run to walk off the division rival Philadelphia Phillies 5–4. Latos, making his first start for the Nationals in a September 12 game against the Mets, became the first Nationals pitcher since 2014 to hit a home run, contributing in an 8–1 victory over New York with his solo home run off Mets starter Rafael Montero. In the Nationals' final game of the season against their New York rivals on September 14, a 1–0 win, second baseman Daniel Murphy went 1-for-2 with a walk, thereby recording at least one hit in every game he played against the team he was with during the previous season. He became the first National League player in 12 years to hit in every game of a season series of at least 19 games and set a record for the longest single-season hitting streak against a previous-year team dating back to the creation of divisions in the major leagues in 1969.

As the Nationals closed in on the division championship, they were beset by a buttocks strain that took Murphy out of the lineup beginning September 18, as well as a forearm injury that sidelined right-handed reliever Matt Belisle beginning September 8, and lost back-to-back series against the division rival Braves and Miami Marlins on the road. In the latter series, on September 20, the team faced Marlins ace José Fernández in what would ultimately be his last pitching performance before his death in an accident five days later. The Nationals were shut out for the first time since the All-Star Break, with Fernández pitching eight innings while giving up just three hits, walking none, and striking out twelve in a winning performance. The Nationals finally clinched the division title on September 24, as they defeated the Pittsburgh Pirates 6–1 behind a short start by Ross and a long relief appearance by López, and the second-place Mets went down to defeat at the hands of the Phillies.

Injuries put holes in the Nationals' starting lineup in the games after they clinched the division. Right fielder Bryce Harper was injured in a September 25 game against the Pirates, jamming his thumb when Pirates third baseman Jung Ho Kang faked a tag that prompted him to make a late slide into third. Nationals manager Dusty Baker took exception to the play, and when Kang next came up to bat, Cole threw a ball behind his back and was ejected from the game, leading to a benches-clearing altercation on the field. Cole denied the pitch was intentional, saying, "The ball was getting away from me a little bit, and that one got away from me." He was suspended five games over the incident and fined, a verdict which he appealed. In the following game, a rain-soaked September 26 matchup with the Arizona Diamondbacks, catcher Wilson Ramos tore the anterior cruciate ligament in his right knee for the second time after making a leaping catch on a relay from first baseman Ryan Zimmerman, forcing him to undergo season-ending surgery. Spencer Kieboom was called up from Harrisburg to replace him on the roster. However, the team also received some bullpen reinforcements as Belisle returned from his injury layoff to pitch against the Pirates in the September 25 game while left-handed reliever Sammy Solis was activated off the disabled list on September 26 and pitched a perfect inning in a 4–2 win over the Diamondbacks the following day.

Starting at second base for the Nationals, Difo recorded his first home run in a 5–3 win over the Diamondbacks on September 29, launching a pitch from left-hander Robbie Ray into the seats in left field at Nationals Park. With the win, the Nationals split the four-game series with Arizona, the last complete series of September and the penultimate series in their 2016 regular season. The team finished September with a 93–67 regular season record and a seven-game lead over the Mets, who clinched a wild card berth after being eliminated from division contention.

=== October ===
The Nationals won both games they played to end the regular season in October, earning a win in a three-game series and sealing the season series against the division rival Miami Marlins. Second baseman Daniel Murphy was in a narrow race with the Colorado Rockies' DJ LeMahieu for the batting title until the last day of the season, but with Murphy injured and LeMahieu not playing in order to preserve his small edge, the race came down to a pinch-hit opportunity for Murphy against Miami on October 2, in which the National flied out to right to finish a little more than a point below LeMahieu.

Nationals pitchers grabbed much of the attention as the season came to an end. On October 1, rookie starting pitcher A. J. Cole dropped his appeal of a five-game suspension handed down by the league for intentionally throwing at a batter the previous month, with the suspension expected to carry over into the 2017 season. The same day, starter Tanner Roark posted his career-best 16th win of the regular season, defeating Wei-Yin Chen and the Marlins 2–1. On October 2, the last day of the regular season, staff ace Max Scherzer earned his 20th win, although he gave up five runs in a seesaw 10–7 victory over the Marlins; he also notched four runs batted in during the game, going 2-for-2, for the first time in his career. Closer Mark Melancon finished his year with 47 saves, the second-highest season total of his career. Catching prospect Spencer Kieboom, meanwhile, made his major league debut on October 2, drawing a walk from Marlins reliever Brian Ellington as a pinch-hitter and then coming around to score later in the inning.

Trea Turner, the Nationals' center fielder and occasional second baseman and shortstop, was named Rookie of the Month in the National League for the second consecutive month. He hit .339 with eight home runs and 15 stolen bases over September and the first two days of October.

=== Notable transactions ===
- May 9, 2016: The Nationals signed Stephen Strasburg to a seven-year contract extension.
- June 8, 2016: The Nationals purchased minor-leaguer Steve Lombardozzi Jr. from the Southern Maryland Blue Crabs.
- June 28, 2016: The Nationals released minor-leaguer Taylor Jordan.
- June 29, 2016: The Nationals signed Mat Latos to a minor league deal.
- July 19, 2016: The Nationals lost minor-leaguer Abel de Los Santos to the Cincinnati Reds on a waiver claim.
- July 30, 2016: The Nationals traded Felipe Rivero and minor-leaguer Taylor Hearn to the Pittsburgh Pirates for Mark Melancon.
- August 13, 2016: The Nationals granted Jonathan Papelbon his unconditional release.
- August 19, 2016: The Nationals purchased minor-leaguer Sean Burnett from the Minnesota Twins.
- August 25, 2016: The Nationals traded minor-leaguer Max Schrock to the Oakland Athletics for Marc Rzepczynski and cash.
- September 26, 2016: The Nationals traded minor-leaguer Chris Bostick to the Pittsburgh Pirates for minor-leaguer Taylor Gushue and cash.

=== Major league debuts ===
- Lucas Giolito (June 28, 2016)
- Koda Glover (July 20, 2016)
- Brian Goodwin (August 6, 2016)
- Spencer Kieboom (October 2, 2016)
- Reynaldo López (July 19, 2016)

=== Culture and entertainment ===
In 2015, the Nationals had entered a three-year marketing partnership with the White House Historical Association in which the President of the United States honored in the Association's annual Christmas ornament each year also would appear that season as a Racing President in the Presidents Race at Nationals Park. In accordance with the agreement, Calvin Coolidge ("Cal") had joined the race in 2015 to become the sixth Racing President. Cal was retired after the 2015 season. In 2016, Herbert Hoover ("Herbie"), the 31st President of the United States, became the new sixth Racing President under the agreement with the Association, joining George Washington ("George"), Thomas Jefferson ("Tom"), Abraham Lincoln ("Abe"), Theodore Roosevelt ("Teddy"), and William Howard Taft ("Bill"). Herbie debuted on April 10, 2016, during a game against the Miami Marlins, and won his first race. Herbie was retired after the season.

=== Attendance ===
The Nationals drew 2,481,938 fans at Nationals Park during 2016, their fifth-highest attendance since arriving in Washington in 2005. It placed them seventh in attendance for the season among the 15 National League teams. Their highest attendance at a home game in Nationals Park was listed at 42,000 for the June 15 game against the Chicago Cubs, while the low mark was 17,161 for a game against the Atlanta Braves on September 6. Their average home attendance was 30,641 per game, fifth-highest since their arrival in Washington.

=== Game log ===
Legend
	Nationals win
	Nationals loss
	Postponement
**Bold**	Nationals team member

2016 game log (95–67)
April: 16–7 (Home: 8–4; Away: 8–3)

#	Date	Opponent	Score	Win	Loss	Save	Attendance	Record
1	April 4	@ Braves	4–3 (10)	**Treinen** (1–0)	O'Flaherty (0–1)	**Papelbon** (1)	48,282	1–0
2	April 6	@ Braves	3–1	**Strasburg** (1–0)	Norris (0–1)	**Papelbon** (2)	18,531	2–0
3	April 7	Marlins	4–6	Phelps (1–0)	**Roark** (0–1)	Ramos (1)	41,650	2–1
–	April 9	Marlins	Postponed (inclement weather) Rescheduled for May 14 as part of a doubleheader					
4	April 10	Marlins	4–2	**Ross** (1–0)	Koehler (0–1)	**Papelbon** (3)	24,593	3–1
5	April 11	Braves	6–4	**Scherzer** (1–0)	Norris (0–2)	**Papelbon** (4)	18,119	4–1
6	April 12	Braves	2–1	**Treinen** (2–0)	Johnson (0–2)	**Rivero** (1)	18,378	5–1
7	April 13	Braves	3–0	**Roark** (1–1)	Wisler (0–1)	**Papelbon** (5)	19,400	6–1
8	April 14	Braves	6–2	**Strasburg** (2–0)	Teherán (0–2)	—	21,144	7–1
9	April 15	@ Phillies	9–1	**Ross** (2–0)	Hellickson (1–1)	—	22,624	8–1
10	April 16	@ Phillies	8–1	**Scherzer** (2–0)	Nola (0–2)	—	30,320	9–1
11	April 17	@ Phillies	2–3 (10)	Gómez (1–0)	**Papelbon** (0–1)	—	37,378	9–2
12	April 18	@ Marlins	1–6	Fernández (1–1)	**Roark** (1–2)	—	16,112	9–3
13	April 19	@ Marlins	7–0	**Strasburg** (3–0)	Conley (0–1)	—	16,529	10–3
14	April 20	@ Marlins	3–1	**Petit** (1–0)	Chen (0–1)	**Papelbon** (6)	16,961	11–3
15	April 21	@ Marlins	1–5	Koehler (1–2)	**Scherzer** (2–1)	—	17,395	11–4
16	April 22	Twins	8–4	**González** (1–0)	Gibson (0–3)	—	27,684	12–4
17	April 23	Twins	2–0	**Roark** (2–2)	Hughes (1–3)	**Papelbon** (7)	35,974	13–4
18	April 24	Twins	6–5 (16)	**Pérez** (1–0)	Tonkin (1–1)	—	35,397	14–4
19	April 26	Phillies	3–4	Velasquez (3–1)	**Pérez** (1–1)	Gómez (5)	25,097	14–5
20	April 27	Phillies	0–3	Hellickson (2–1)	**González** (1–1)	Gómez (6)	24,186	14–6
21	April 28	Phillies	0–3	Araújo (1–0)	**Rivero** (0–1)	Gómez (7)	22,112	14–7
22	April 29	@ Cardinals	5–4	**Strasburg** (4–0)	Leake (0–3)	**Papelbon** (8)	45,246	15–7
23	April 30	@ Cardinals	6–1	**Ross** (3–0)	García (1–2)	—	42,723	16–7

May: 16–14 (Home: 7–7; Away: 9–7)

#	Date	Opponent	Score	Win	Loss	Save	Attendance	Record
24	May 1	@ Cardinals	6–1	**Scherzer** (3–1)	Martínez (4–1)	—	42,933	17–7
25	May 2	@ Royals	2–0	**González** (2–1)	Vólquez (3–2)	**Papelbon** (9)	32,394	18–7
26	May 3	@ Royals	6–7	Wang (1–0)	**Papelbon** (0–2)	—	33,729	18–8
27	May 4	@ Royals	13–2	**Strasburg** (5–0)	Medlen (1–3)	—	38,610	19–8
28	May 5	@ Cubs	2–5	Hendricks (2–2)	**Ross** (3–1)	—	37,564	19–9
29	May 6	@ Cubs	6–8	Lackey (4–1)	**Scherzer** (3–2)	Rondón (5)	39,206	19–10
30	May 7	@ Cubs	5–8	Warren (3–0)	**Solis** (0–1)	Rondón (6)	40,471	19–11
31	May 8	@ Cubs	3–4 (13)	Wood (1–0)	**Treinen** (2–1)	—	41,233	19–12
32	May 9	Tigers	5–4	**Kelley** (1–0)	Lowe (1–2)	—	27,153	20–12
33	May 10	Tigers	4–5	Fulmer (2–1)	**Ross** (3–2)	Rodríguez (8)	24,476	20–13
34	May 11	Tigers	3–2	**Scherzer** (4–2)	Zimmermann (5–2)	—	35,695	21–13
35	May 13	Marlins	5–3	**Treinen** (3–1)	Barraclough (2–1)	**Papelbon** (10)	28,232	22–13
36	May 14 (1)	Marlins	6–4	**Strasburg** (6–0)	Nicolino (2–1)	**Papelbon** (11)	28,634	23–13
37	May 14 (2)	Marlins	1–7	Ureña (1–0)	**Roark** (2–3)	—	30,019	23–14
38	May 15	Marlins	1–5	Fernández (5–2)	**Ross** (3–3)	Ramos (11)	36,786	23–15
39	May 17	@ Mets	0–2	Syndergaard (4–2)	**Scherzer** (4–3)	Familia (13)	36,701	23–16
40	May 18	@ Mets	7–1	**González** (3–1)	Colón (3–3)	—	30,100	24–16
41	May 19	@ Mets	9–1	**Strasburg** (7–0)	Harvey (3–6)	—	39,494	25–16
42	May 20	@ Marlins	4–1	**Roark** (3–3)	Nicolino (2–2)	**Papelbon** (12)	20,017	26–16
43	May 21	@ Marlins	2–3	Fernández (6–2)	**Ross** (3–4)	Ramos (13)	25,839	26–17
44	May 22	@ Marlins	8–2	**Scherzer** (5–3)	Conley (3–3)	—	24,308	27–17
45	May 23	Mets	1–7	Colón (4–3)	**González** (3–2)	—	31,264	27–18
46	May 24	Mets	7–4	**Strasburg** (8–0)	Harvey (3–7)	—	33,096	28–18
47	May 25	Mets	0–2	Matz (7–1)	**Roark** (3–4)	Familia (16)	38,700	28–19
48	May 26	Cardinals	2–1	**Ross** (4–4)	Leake (3–4)	**Papelbon** (13)	26,176	29–19
49	May 27	Cardinals	2–6	García (4–4)	**Scherzer** (5–4)	—	30,781	29–20
50	May 28	Cardinals	4–9	Wainwright (5–3)	**González** (3–3)	—	38,274	29–21
51	May 29	Cardinals	10–2	**Strasburg** (9–0)	Wacha (2–6)	—	38,898	30–21
52	May 30	@ Phillies	4–3	**Roark** (4–4)	Neris (1–2)	**Papelbon** (14)	21,993	31–21
53	May 31	@ Phillies	5–1	**Ross** (5–4)	Nola (4–4)	—	18,572	32–21

June: 16–11 (Home: 9–1; Away: 7–10)

#	Date	Opponent	Score	Win	Loss	Save	Attendance	Record
54	June 1	@ Phillies	7–2	**Scherzer** (6–4)	Morgan (1–4)	—	19,052	33–21
55	June 3	@ Reds	2–7	Finnegan (2–4)	**González** (3–4)	—	27,258	33–22
56	June 4	@ Reds	3–6	Ohlendorf (4–4)	**Rivero** (0–2)	Cingrani (5)	25,365	33–23
57	June 5	@ Reds	10–9	**Solis** (1–1)	Wright (0–2)	**Papelbon** (15)	21,422	34–23
58	June 7	@ White Sox	10–5	**Treinen** (4–1)	Latos (6–2)	—	18,812	35–23
59	June 8	@ White Sox	11–4	**Scherzer** (7–4)	Shields (2–8)	—	15,273	36–23
60	June 9	@ White Sox	1–3	González (1–1)	**González** (3–5)	Robertson (14)	20,014	36–24
61	June 10	Phillies	9–6	**Strasburg** (10–0)	Hellickson (4–4)	**Papelbon** (16)	37,941	37–24
62	June 11	Phillies	8–0	**Roark** (5–4)	Nola (5–5)	—	38,044	38–24
63	June 12	Phillies	5–4	**Papelbon** (1–2)	Gómez (2–2)	—	34,294	39–24
64	June 13	Cubs	4–1	**Scherzer** (8–4)	Hendricks (4–6)	**Kelley** (1)	37,187	40–24
65	June 14	Cubs	3–4	Rondón (1–1)	**Solis** (1–2)	—	41,955	40–25
66	June 15	Cubs	5–4 (12)	**Petit** (2–0)	Cahill (0–2)	—	42,000	41–25
67	June 16	@ Padres	8–5	**Roark** (6–4)	Johnson (0–4)	**Kelley** (2)	22,648	42–25
68	June 17	@ Padres	7–5	**Ross** (6–4)	Friedrich (3–2)	**Petit** (1)	31,137	43–25
69	June 18	@ Padres	3–7	Quackenbush (4–3)	**Rivero** (0–3)	—	34,113	43–26
70	June 19	@ Padres	3–6	Pomeranz (6–7)	**González** (3–6)	Rodney (14)	32,285	43–27
71	June 20	@ Dodgers	1–4	Kershaw (11–1)	**Petit** (2–1)	Jansen (20)	44,712	43–28
72	June 21	@ Dodgers	2–3	Coleman (1–1)	**Roark** (6–5)	Jansen (21)	42,307	43–29
73	June 22	@ Dodgers	3–4	Hatcher (5–3)	**Kelley** (1–1)	—	43,776	43–30
74	June 24	@ Brewers	3–5	Torres (1–1)	**Scherzer** (8–5)	Jeffress (20)	32,668	43–31
75	June 25	@ Brewers	5–6	Garza (1–0)	**González** (3–7)	Jeffress (21)	30,085	43–32
76	June 26	@ Brewers	3–2	**Roark** (7–5)	Barnes (0–1)	**Kelley** (3)	30,215	44–32
77	June 27	Mets	11–4	**Ross** (7–4)	Syndergaard (8–3)	—	33,109	45–32
78	June 28	Mets	5–0	**Pérez** (2–1)	Harvey (4–10)	—	29,918	46–32
79	June 29	Mets	4–2	**Scherzer** (9–5)	Verrett (3–5)	**Kelley** (4)	33,386	47–32
80	June 30	Reds	13–4	**González** (4–7)	Finnegan (3–7)	—	29,386	48–32

July: 13–12 (Home: 7–8; Away: 6–4)

#	Date	Opponent	Score	Win	Loss	Save	Attendance	Record
81	July 1	Reds	3–2 (14)	**Petit** (3–1)	Ohlendorf (5–6)	—	27,631	49–32
82	July 2	Reds	4–9 (10)	Smith (1–1)	**Solis** (1–3)	—	35,195	49–33
83	July 3	Reds	12–1	**Strasburg** (11–0)	Lamb (1–5)	—	37,328	50–33
84	July 4	Brewers	0–1	Guerra (6–1)	**Scherzer** (9–6)	Jeffress (22)	29,174	50–34
85	July 5	Brewers	2–5	Davies (6–4)	**González** (4–8)	Jeffress (23)	25,138	50–35
85	July 6	Brewers	7–4	**Roark** (8–5)	Garza (1–2)	**Papelbon** (17)	26,330	51–35
87	July 7	@ Mets	7–9	Robles (3–3)	**Pérez** (2–2)	Familia (31)	37,569	51–36
88	July 8	@ Mets	3–1	**Strasburg** (12–0)	Syndergaard (9–4)	**Papelbon** (18)	35,030	52–36
89	July 9	@ Mets	6–1	**Scherzer** (10–6)	Verrett (3–6)	—	36,953	53–36
90	July 10	@ Mets	3–2	**González** (5–8)	Matz (7–5)	**Papelbon** (19)	35,778	54–36
**All–Star Break (July 11–14)**
91	July 15	Pirates	5–1	**Strasburg** (13–0)	Liriano (5–9)	—	36,982	55–36
92	July 16	Pirates	6–0	**Roark** (9–5)	Cole (5–5)	—	38,861	56–36
93	July 17	Pirates	1–2 (18)	Niese (8–6)	**Pérez** (2–3)	—	32,755	56–37
94	July 19	Dodgers	4–8	Kazmir (8–3)	**López** (0–1)	—	38,747	56–38
95	July 20	Dodgers	8–1	**González** (6–8)	Norris (5–8)	—	34,050	57–38
96	July 21	Dodgers	3–6	Liberatore (2–0)	**Strasburg** (13–1)	Jansen (28)	38,586	57–39
97	July 22	Padres	3–5	Perdomo (4–4)	**Roark** (9–6)	Maurer (4)	31,618	57–40
98	July 23	Padres	3–2	**Papelbon** (2–2)	Quackenbush (6–4)	—	30,747	58–40
99	July 24	Padres	6–10	Buchter (2–0)	**Papelbon** (2–3)	—	30,663	58–41
100	July 26	@ Indians	6–7	Shaw (2–4)	**Papelbon** (2–4)	—	23,771	58–42
101	July 27	@ Indians	4–1	**Strasburg** (14–1)	Carrasco (7–4)	**Treinen** (1)	26,607	59–42
102	July 28	@ Giants	4–2	**Roark** (10–6)	Cueto (13–3)	**Kelley** (5)	42,001	60–42
103	July 29	@ Giants	4–1	**Scherzer** (11–6)	Samardzija (9–7)	**Kelley** (6)	41,959	61–42
104	July 30	@ Giants	3–5	Law (4–1)	**Petit** (3–2)	Casilla (23)	41,743	61–43
105	July 31	@ Giants	1–3	Cain (3–6)	**González** (6–9)	Casilla (24)	41,795	61–44

August: 17–11 (Home: 7–6; Away: 10–5)

#	Date	Opponent	Score	Win	Loss	Save	Attendance	Record
106	August 1	@ Diamondbacks	14–1	**Strasburg** (15–1)	Bradley (4–7)	—	17,518	62–44
107	August 2	@ Diamondbacks	10–4	**Roark** (11–6)	Ray (5–11)	—	19,919	63–44
108	August 3	@ Diamondbacks	8–3	**Scherzer** (12–6)	Godley (3–2)	—	17,086	64–44
109	August 5	Giants	5–1	**González** (7–9)	Samardzija (9–8)	—	34,036	65–44
110	August 6	Giants	1–7	Cain (4–6)	**Strasburg** (15–2)	—	36,404	65–45
111	August 7	Giants	1–0	**Roark** (12–6)	Bumgarner (10–7)	**Melancon** (31)	32,790	66–45
112	August 9	Indians	1–3	Bauer (8–5)	**Scherzer** (12–7)	Allen (21)	30,978	66–46
113	August 10	Indians	7–4	**González** (8–9)	Tomlin (11–5)	**Melancon** (32)	30,185	67–46
114	August 12	Braves	5–8	Foltynewicz (6–5)	**Strasburg** (15–3)	Johnson (10)	29,089	67–47
115	August 13	Braves	7–6	**López** (1–1)	Whalen (1–1)	**Melancon** (33)	38,490	68–47
116	August 14	Braves	9–1	**Roark** (13–6)	Jenkins (2–3)	—	29,107	69–47
117	August 15	@ Rockies	5–4	**Solis** (2–3)	Lyles (3–4)	**Melancon** (34)	27,818	70–47
118	August 16	@ Rockies	2–6	Rusin (3–4)	**Petit** (3–3)	—	29,209	70–48
119	August 17	@ Rockies	10–12	Logan (2–2)	**Strasburg** (15–4)	Oberg (1)	25,308	70–49
120	August 18	@ Braves	8–2	**López** (2–1)	Whalen (1–2)	—	24,099	71–49
121	August 19	@ Braves	7–6	**Glover** (1–0)	Johnson (2–6)	**Melancon** (35)	30,292	72–49
122	August 20	@ Braves	11–9	**Scherzer** (13–7)	Jenkins (2–4)	**Melancon** (36)	42,421	73–49
123	August 21	@ Braves	6–7 (10)	Ramírez (1–0)	**Kelley** (1–2)	—	25,341	73–50
124	August 22	@ Orioles	3–4	Bundy (7–4)	**Cole** (0–1)	Britton (38)	31,660	73–51
125	August 23	@ Orioles	1–8	Gausman (5–10)	**López** (2–2)	Worley (1)	26,697	73–52
126	August 24	Orioles	8–10	Miley (8–10)	**Roark** (13–7)	—	39,100	73–53
127	August 25	Orioles	4–0	**Scherzer** (14–7)	Jiménez (5–11)	—	39,722	74–53
128	August 26	Rockies	8–5	**González** (9–9)	Hoffman (0–2)	—	33,433	75–53
129	August 27	Rockies	4–9 (11)	McGee (1–3)	**Petit** (3–4)	—	27,901	75–54
130	August 28	Rockies	3–5	Bettis (11–7)	**Giolito** (0–1)	Ottavino (2)	28,124	75–55
131	August 29	@ Phillies	4–0	**Roark** (14–7)	Thompson (1–4)	—	16,056	76–55
132	August 30	@ Phillies	3–2	**Scherzer** (15–7)	Eickhoff (9–13)	**Melancon** (37)	16,378	77–55
133	August 31	@ Phillies	2–1	**González** (10–9)	Morgan (1–9)	**Kelley** (7)	16,503	78–55

September: 15–12 (Home: 10–5; Away: 5–7)

#	Date	Opponent	Score	Win	Loss	Save	Attendance	Record
134	September 2	@ Mets	4–1	**Cole** (1–1)	Syndergaard (12–8)	**Melancon** (38)	32,040	79–55
135	September 3	@ Mets	1–3	Gsellman (2–1)	**Roark** (14–8)	Familia (45)	36,118	79–56
136	September 4	@ Mets	1–5	Lugo (3–2)	**López** (2–3)	—	30,257	79–57
137	September 5	Braves	6–4	**Scherzer** (16–7)	Weber (1–1)	—	26,005	80–57
138	September 6	Braves	9–7	**Glover** (2–0)	Ramírez (2–2)	**Melancon** (39)	17,161	81–57
139	September 7	Braves	5–4 (11)	**Latos** (7–2)	Bradley (1–1)	—	19,894	82–57
140	September 8	Phillies	1–4	Asher (1–0)	**Cole** (1–2)	Gomez (36)	25,412	82–58
141	September 9	Phillies	5–4	**Melancon** (2–1)	Herrmann (0–2)	—	28,469	83–58
142	September 10	Phillies	3–0	**Kelley** (2–2)	García (1–1)	**Melancon** (40)	36,152	84–58
143	September 11	Phillies	3–2	**González** (11–9)	Morgan (2–10)	**Melancon** (41)	31,805	85–58
144	September 12	Mets	8–1	**López** (3–3)	Montero (0–1)	—	22,832	86–58
145	September 13	Mets	3–4 (10)	Familia (3–3)	**Melancon** (2–2)	Blevins (1)	25,796	86–59
146	September 14	Mets	1–0	**Roark** (15–8)	Salas (0–1)	**Melancon** (42)	29,669	87–59
147	September 16	@ Braves	7–2	**Scherzer** (17–7)	Gant (1–4)	—	33,618	88–59
148	September 17	@ Braves	3–7	Collmenter (2–0)	**González** (11–10)	—	36,016	88–60
149	September 18	@ Braves	2–6 (7)	Wisler (7–12)	**Ross** (7–5)	—	37,296	88–61
150	September 19	@ Marlins	3–4	Ellington (3–2)	**Latos** (7–3)	Ramos (38)	17,214	88–62
151	September 20	@ Marlins	0–1	Fernández (16–8)	**Roark** (15–9)	Phelps (4)	17,961	88–63
152	September 21	@ Marlins	8–3	**Scherzer** (18–7)	Koehler (9–12)	—	17,836	89–63
153	September 23	@ Pirates	5–6 (11)	LeBlanc (1–0)	**Petit** (3–5)	—	29,513	89–64
154	September 24	@ Pirates	6–1	**López** (4–3)	Nova (5–2)	—	30,137	90–64
155	September 25	@ Pirates	10–7	**Kelley** (3–2)	Rivero (1–5)	**Melancon** (43)	28,924	91–64
156	September 26	Diamondbacks	4–14	Godley (5–4)	**Roark** (15–10)	—	18,707	91–65
157	September 27	Diamondbacks	4–2	**Scherzer** (19–7)	Delgado (4–2)	**Melancon** (44)	24,297	92–65
158	September 28	Diamondbacks	0–3 (6)	Miller (3–12)	**González** (11–11)	—	20,577	92–66
159	September 29	Diamondbacks	5–3	**López** (5–3)	Ray (8–15)	**Melancon** (45)	21,618	93–66
160	September 30	Marlins	4–7	Dunn (6–1)	**Solis** (2–4)	Ramos (40)	30,857	93–67

October: 2–0 (Home: 2–0; Away: 0–0)

#	Date	Opponent	Score	Win	Loss	Save	Attendance	Record
161	October 1	Marlins	2–1	**Roark** (16–10)	Chen (5–5)	**Melancon** (46)	31,635	94–67
162	October 2	Marlins	10–7	**Scherzer** (20–7)	Brice (0–1)	**Melancon** (47)	28,730	95–67

== Postseason ==
=== Postseason game log ===
2016 postseason game log (2–3)
National League Division Series vs. Los Angeles Dodgers (2–3)

#	Date	Opponent	Score	Win	Loss	Save	Attendance	Series
1	October 7	Dodgers	3–4	Kershaw (1–0)	Scherzer (0–1)	Jansen (1)	43,915	0–1
–	October 8	Dodgers	Postponed (rain) Rescheduled for October 9					
2	October 9	Dodgers	5–2	Treinen (1–0)	Hill (0–1)	Melancon (1)	43,826	1–1
3	October 10	@ Dodgers	8–3	Solis (1–0)	Maeda (0–1)	–	53,901	2–1
4	October 11	@ Dodgers	5–6	Blanton (1–0)	Treinen (1–1)	Jansen (2)	49,617	2–2
5	October 13	Dodgers	3–4	Urías (1–0)	Rzepczynski (0–1)	Kershaw (1)	43,936	2–3

=== Division Series ===
==== Game 1, October 7 ====
5:38 p.m. (EDT) at Nationals Park in Washington, D.C.

Plans called for retired pitcher and former National Liván Hernández to throw out the ceremonial first pitch, but after Hurricane Matthew's effects on Florida made it impossible for Hernández to fly to Washington, the Nationals surprised the fans at Nationals Park by having Nationals starting catcher Wilson Ramos – whose season had ended with a knee injury on September 26 – throw it instead, to a huge roar from the crowd. The game provided an historic first: When Dusty Baker and Los Angeles Dodgers manager Dave Roberts exchanged lineup cards before the game, it became the first postseason game in Major League Baseball history in which two African-American managers faced one another.

The game was billed as a marquee match-up between two of the best starting pitchers in Major League Baseball, Clayton Kershaw for the Dodgers and Max Scherzer for the Nationals, but neither starter was particularly sharp. with Nationals rookie Pedro Severino catching, Scherzer gave up a solo home run – the 32nd homer he had given up in 2016 – to the second batter he faced, Dodgers rookie shortstop Corey Seager, on his sixth pitch of the game. In the third inning, after Dodgers second baseman Chase Utley drove in left fielder Andrew Toles with an RBI single, Scherzer gave up his 33rd home run of the year, a two-run shot to Dodgers third baseman Justin Turner, giving Los Angeles a 4–0 lead. The Dodgers did not score again; Scherzer did not allow another run before he left the game after six innings, and the Nationals bullpen also held them scoreless.

Kershaw pitched five innings and held on to the lead, but the Nationals repeatedly pushed him to the brink, and his frequent discussions on the mound with Dodgers catcher Yasmani Grandal incited a chorus of boos from the crowd. In the second inning, with two Nationals on base after Daniel Murphy and Ryan Zimmerman singled and Anthony Rendon reached first on a fielder's choice, Danny Espinosa – batting seventh instead of a probable eighth due to Ramos's unavailability – struck out for the second out. A Dodgers error then allowed Severino to reach first base and load the bases, but Scherzer popped out to end the inning without the Nationals scoring a run. In the third inning, Rendon singled to drive in two runs as part of what promised to be a big inning, cutting the Dodgers' lead to 4–2, but Espinosa struck out to end the inning with two men on base. Severino doubled in the fourth and scored on a sacrifice fly by Trea Turner to reduce the Dodgers' lead to 4–3, but in the fifth, with Jayson Werth and Rendon on base, Espinosa again struck out to end the inning. Although he provided his typically reliable defense in the field during the game, Espinosa's strikeouts had left six men on base and brought three rallies to an end.

Kershaw left the game after five innings and 101 pitches, having given up three runs, all earned, on eight hits and a walk with seven strikeouts. The Los Angeles bullpen followed with four innings of shut-out ball, but the Nationals had ample opportunities to tie the game. Trea Turner, a prolific base-stealer, walked in the sixth inning but was stranded at first. In the seventh inning, Murphy walked with one out, but then got a poor jump in an attempt to steal second and was thrown out. In the eighth, Clint Robinson doubled in the first postseason plate appearance of his career and speedy Michael A. Taylor entered the game to pinch-run for him, but Dodgers closer Kenley Jansen struck out pinch-hitter Chris Heisey on a called third strike to end the inning. It was the Nationals' last scoring threat; they had the tying run on base in four of the game's last five innings without being able to score a single run, and left a total of nine men on base during the game. The Dodgers won 4–3 to take a 1–0 lead in the series.

Team	1	2	3	4	5	6	7	8	9	R	H	E
Los Angeles	1	0	3	0	0	0	0	0	0	4	8	1
Washington	0	0	2	1	0	0	0	0	0	3	9	0
WP: Clayton Kershaw (1–0) LP: Max Scherzer (0–1) Sv: Kenley Jansen (1); Home runs: LAD: Corey Seager (1), Justin Turner (1); WSH: None; Attendance: 43,915

==== Game 2, October 9 ====
1:08 p.m. (EDT) at Nationals Park in Washington, D.C.

Originally scheduled to begin at 4:08 p.m. EDT on October 8, Game 2 was postponed due to rain and rescheduled for 1:08 p.m. EDT on October 9. Retired first baseman and former National Adam LaRoche threw out the ceremonial first pitch, tossing it to his son Drake, who spent a great deal of time with the Nationals during his father's years on the team.

Game 2 began much as Game 1 had: Washington's starting pitcher – Tanner Roark, starting Game 2 because Stephen Strasburg remained sidelined with an injury – struggled; for the second game in a row, Los Angeles shortstop Corey Seager hit a first-inning solo home run in the Dodgers' second at-bat of the game; and the Dodgers' starter, Rich Hill, struck out the side in the bottom of the first, as Clayton Kershaw had in Game 1. The Nationals, meanwhile, again missed a chance at a big inning when reserve catcher José Lobatón, starting in the postseason due to the unavailability of the injured Wilson Ramos, hit into a double play with the bases loaded to end the second inning.

The Dodgers added another run in the third inning on an RBI single by right fielder Josh Reddick; Bryce Harper made a good throw to the plate from right field, but Lobatón was unable to tag Dodgers third baseman Justin Turner out at home. Dodgers starter Rich Hill used his curveball very effectively for 3 2/3 innings, and Los Angeles held a 2–0 lead in the bottom of the third when Lobatón came to bat again with two outs and Daniel Murphy and Danny Espinosa on base. Lobatón hit only the second postseason home run of his career, (Note: José Lobatón's only previous postseason home run had been a walk-off homer for the Tampa Bay Rays in 2013. (See DiNitto, Marcus, "MLB playoffs 2016: Three takeaways from Nationals' NLDS Game 2 win over Dodgers," sportingnews.com, October 9, 2016.)) and only the second postseason homer by a catcher in the history of the Montreal-Washington franchise, (Note: The only previous postseason home run by a catcher for the Montreal-Washington franchise was by Gary Carter for the Montreal Expos in 1981. (See DiNitto, Marcus, "MLB playoffs 2016: Three takeaways from Nationals' NLDS Game 2 win over Dodgers," sportingnews.com, October 9, 2016.)) driving in Murphy and Espinosa to give the Nationals a 3–2 lead, the first time they had taken the lead in the series.

Although Roark had an uncharacteristically unsteady outing, the Dodgers were 0-for-6 with runners in scoring position during the first five innings even though they had the bases loaded with one out three times, at least in part thanks to good Nationals defensive plays, notably by left fielder Jayson Werth. A tiring Roark left the game in the fifth inning – after 4 1/3 innings pitched and 85 pitches – with two Dodgers on base and Washington still holding a 3–2 lead. After that, Washington's bullpen – a postseason weakness for the 2012 and 2014 teams – held the Dodgers scoreless; Marc Rzepczynski, Sammy Solis, Blake Treinen, Óliver Pérez, and Mark Melancon combined to give up only three walks (all by Rzepczynski) and one hit (a single yielded by Melancon) in the game's remaining 4 2/3 innings, striking out five Dodgers. The Dodgers were 1-for-9 with runners in scoring position during the game, and by the end of the game, the Nationals' bullpen had pitched 7 2/3 innings in the series without giving up a run. Meanwhile, Murphy – who went 3-for-3 and scored a run, pushing his offensive output for the series' first two games to 4-for-6 with two walks – drove in runs with singles in the fifth and seventh innings as Nationals fans in the crowd chanted ""MVP! MVP!" The Nationals went 4-for-8 with runners in scoring position, a turnaround from their previous postseason performance: From Game 5 of the 2012 National League Division Series until Lobatón's homer in the third inning, they had gone only 3-for-35 in the postseason with runners in scoring position.

Washington won 5–2 to even the series at 1–1. It was the first come-from-behind postseason win for a Washington, D.C., Major League Baseball team since the Washington Senators came from behind to beat the Pittsburgh Pirates 4–3 in Game 3 of the 1925 World Series 91 years earlier on October 10, 1925. It also was the Nationals' first postseason victory at home since a 2–1 win over the St. Louis Cardinals in Game 4 of the 2012 National League Division Series on October 11, 2012.

Team	1	2	3	4	5	6	7	8	9	R	H	E
Los Angeles	1	1	0	0	0	0	0	0	0	2	8	0
Washington	0	0	0	3	1	0	1	0	X	5	9	0
WP: Blake Treinen (1–0) LP: Rich Hill (0–1) Sv: Mark Melancon (1); Home runs: LAD: Corey Seager (2); WSH: José Lobatón (1); Attendance: 43,826

==== Game 3, October 10 ====
4:08 p.m. (EDT) at Dodger Stadium in Los Angeles, California

The Nationals put pressure on Dodgers starter Kenta Maeda from the outset, loading the bases in the first inning on a single and two walks; although they did not score, they forced him to throw 28 pitches. In the Dodgers' half of the first, Nationals starter Gio González – who had a set a goal for himself of pitching late into the game - walked Los Angeles third baseman Justin Turner; Dodgers shortstop Corey Seager then staked the Dodgers to a 1–0 lead in the first inning, as he had in both previous games of the series, this time with an RBI double that drove in Turner.

The Nationals' offense erupted in the third inning. Center fielder Trea Turner singled, then scored to tie the game at 1–1 when left fielder Jayson Werth doubled. Right fielder Bryce Harper then singled, scoring Werth to give the Nats a 2–1 lead, and third baseman Anthony Rendon followed that with a 432-foot (132-meter), two-run home run into the left field seats, putting Washington ahead 4–1. Maeda left the game after the inning, having thrown 68 pitches.

After the Dodgers scored their first-inning run, Gio González retired 11 of the next 12 batters he faced. However, throwing his 83rd pitch of the game with one out in the fifth inning, he gave up a two-run homer to Dodgers pinch-hitter Carlos Ruiz that narrowed the Nationals' lead to 4–3. Nationals manager Dusty Baker immediately took González out of the game, and, for the second consecutive game, Nationals relievers had to pitch the final 4 2/3 innings. Sammy Solis relieved González and pitched 1 2/3 innings, followed by Óliver Pérez for a third of an inning and Shawn Kelley for 1 2/3 innings, all scoreless; Kelley retired all five Dodgers he faced, striking out three of them. The Dodgers' bullpen also shut the Nationals out through the eighth inning, and Washington still clung to a 4–3 lead going into the ninth.

Los Angeles closer Kenley Jansen came in to pitch the ninth inning, hoping to hold the score at 4–3 and give the Dodgers a chance to tie or win the game in the bottom of the inning. But Jayson Werth led off with a 450-foot (137-meter) home run into the left-field stands that quieted the crowd and gave the Nationals an important insurance run. Jansen then walked second baseman Daniel Murphy and hit Harper with a pitch and, after Rendon popped out, first baseman Ryan Zimmerman doubled off the right field wall, scoring both Murphy and Harper and knocking Jansen out of the game. By the time Washington pinch hitter Chris Heisey came to bat with a 7–3 lead, many Dodger fans were leaving the stadium; Heisey capped the inning by scoring Zimmerman with a sacrifice fly to make the score 8–3. Nationals closer Mark Melancon then pitched a perfect ninth to seal the victory, completing 4 2/3 scoreless innings by the Nationals' bullpen; in the series thus far, Nationals relievers had pitched 12 1/3 innings without yielding a single run, striking out 14 Dodgers.

By the end of the game, Zimmerman was hitting .455 in the series, while Werth was hitting .417 and Murphy .400. The win gave the Nationals a 2–1 lead in the series, their first lead in a postseason series since the first game of the 2012 National League Division Series.

Team	1	2	3	4	5	6	7	8	9	R	H	E
Washington	0	0	4	0	0	0	0	0	4	8	9	0
Los Angeles	1	0	0	0	2	0	0	0	0	3	6	1
WP: Sammy Solis (1–0) LP: Kenta Maeda (0–1); Home runs: WSH: Anthony Rendon (1), Jayson Werth (1); LAD: Carlos Ruiz (1); Attendance: 53,901

==== Game 4, October 11 ====
5:08 p.m. (EDT) at Dodger Stadium in Los Angeles, California

Facing elimination, the Dodgers opted to have their ace starter Clayton Kershaw pitch again on only three days' rest. In the top of the first inning, the Nationals pressed him, with center fielder Trea Turner leading off with a walk and right fielder Bryce Harper following with a single, after which second baseman Daniel Murphy drove in Turner with an RBI single to give the Nationals a run in the first inning for the first time in the series. Nationals starter Joe Ross, however, had a rough first inning himself, hitting Los Angeles third baseman Justin Turner with a pitch and giving up a two-run homer to first baseman Adrián González.

With a 2–1 lead, Kershaw then settled down, allowing Washington to tie the game at 2–2 in the top of the third with singles by Trea Turner and left fielder Jayson Werth and a sacrifice fly by Murphy that drove in Turner, but otherwise keeping the Nationals scoreless until the seventh inning. Ross, meanwhile, struggled. In the bottom of the third inning, he gave up a lead-off double to Kershaw; after keeping Kershaw at second and recording two outs, he allowed a single by Justin Turner that scored Kershaw, walked Adrián González and right fielder Josh Reddick to load the bases, and then hit center fielder Joc Pederson with a pitch, forcing Justin Turner home from third. Ross left the game with the Dodgers leading 4–2, having thrown 55 pitches in 2 2/3 innings, giving up four runs, all earned, on three hits and two walks, and striking out three.

The Nationals bullpen faced another long outing. They stretched their streak of scoreless innings in the series to 14 1/3, but with two outs in the bottom of the fifth inning, Reynaldo López became the first Washington reliever to give up a run in the series when Reddick singled and Pederson drove him in with an RBI double, giving Los Angeles a 5–2 lead. The Nationals' offense, meanwhile, finally got to Kershaw, staging a comeback in the top of the seventh inning. Shortstop Danny Espinosa, who had gone 0-for-10 with nine strikeouts in the series, singled for his first hit of the 2016 postseason. He was still on first with two outs when Trea Turner singled and Harper walked to load the bases, driving Kershaw out of the game after throwing 110 pitches. Dodgers reliever Pedro Baez then hit Werth with a pitch to force Espinosa home, and Los Angeles reliever Luis Avilán gave up a single to Murphy that scored Turner and Harper, tying the game at 5–5, with all five Nationals runs charged to Kershaw. Kershaw's day ended with a 6.17 ERA in his two outings against the Nats.

Pitching the bottom of the eighth for Washington, Blake Treinen got the first two outs, but then hit Dodgers left fielder Andrew Toles with a pitch and gave up a single to pinch-hitter Andre Ethier, followed by a single by second baseman Chase Utley that drove in Toles to give the Dodgers a 6–5 lead. Dodgers closer Kenley Jansen secured the Dodgers' victory with a perfect ninth in which he struck out two Nats, and Los Angeles tied the series at 2–2 to force a decisive Game 5 two nights later.

Daniel Murphy's 2-for-3 performance in the game pushed his postseason average for 2016 to .462, and his four RBIs set a new Montreal-Washington franchise record for RBIs by a single player in a postseason game. At the end of the game, the Nationals' bullpen ERA for the series stood at 1.02, with only two runs given up in 17 2/3 innings of work. Washington's starters, in contrast, had pitched only 16 1/3 innings and given up 13 runs, with a 7.16 ERA for the series.

When Blake Treinen hit Andrew Toles with a pitch in the bottom of the eighth inning, it set two new Major League Baseball records: It was the first time in history that one team's pitchers hit four batters with pitches in a single postseason game, and it was also the first time that two teams had combined to hit 11 batters with pitches in the course of a single postseason series.

Team	1	2	3	4	5	6	7	8	9	R	H	E
Washington	1	0	1	0	0	0	3	0	0	5	8	0
Los Angeles	2	0	2	0	1	0	0	1	X	6	7	0
WP: Joe Blanton (1–0) LP: Blake Treinen (1–1) Sv: Kenley Jansen (2); Home runs: WSH: None; LAD: Adrián González (1); Attendance: 49,617

==== Game 5, October 13 ====
8:08 p.m. (EDT) at Nationals Park in Washington, D.C.

Retired pitcher and former National Liván Hernández had missed the chance to throw out the ceremonial first pitch in Game 1 when Hurricane Matthew made it impossible for him to fly from Florida to Washington for that game, but he threw out the first pitch for Game 5 instead. For some the game carried an historic weight that would either confirm or change the narrative of the Nationals, their achievements, and their prospects for the future after their collapse in the 2012 NLDS and the impotence of their offense in the 2014 NLDS. A Washington, D.C., MLB team had not won a postseason series since the Washington Senators won the 1924 World Series, the Montreal-Washington franchise had won only one playoff series in its history (in 1981, as the Montreal Expos), and the Nationals had never advanced beyond the NLDS in two previous tries. Two personal negative streaks also were on the line: Teams Dusty Baker managed had lost eight straight postseason elimination games in a row in which they had a chance to advance to the next round of the playoffs, and starting pitcher Max Scherzer had started three postseason elimination games in a row for his previous teams, all of them losses.

Scherzer held the Dodgers hitless until the fifth inning, when Los Angeles right fielder Josh Reddick finally singled. The Dodgers loaded the bases with two more singles, but Scherzer struck out pinch hitter Andre Ethier and got second baseman Chase Utley to ground out to end the inning without the Dodgers scoring. The Nats, meanwhile, staked Scherzer to a 1–0 lead off Dodgers starter Rich Hill in the bottom of the second inning when second baseman Daniel Murphy singled, first baseman Ryan Zimmerman walked, and shortstop Danny Espinosa singled to drive in Murphy. But they missed scoring opportunities that followed. In the third inning, center fielder Trea Turner singled, stole second, and advanced to third on a fly out and Murphy was intentionally walked and stole second, but Dodgers reliever Joe Blanton entered the game and got third baseman Anthony Rendon to line out to end the inning without driving either of them in. In the fifth inning, Dodgers pitcher Julio Urías walked right fielder Bryce Harper but then picked him off first. And in the sixth inning, after left fielder Jayson Werth walked, Zimmerman doubled with two outs and third base coach Bob Hendley ill-advisedly sent Werth home as he rounded third; the Dodgers cut Werth down at the plate easily to end the inning.

The Nationals still clung to a 1–0 lead when disaster struck them in the top of the seventh inning, in which the Nationals used a single-inning record six pitchers. Los Angeles center fielder Joc Pederson hit Scherzer's first pitch into the left field stands to tie the game at 1–1, prompting Baker to take Scherzer out of the game after 99 pitches. Reliever Marc Rzepczynski then walked Dodgers catcher Yasmani Grandal; Blake Treinen gave up a single to pinch-hitter Howie Kendrick; Sammy Solis gave up a one-out single to pinch-hitter Carlos Ruiz which scored pinch-runner Austin Barnes to give the Dodgers a 2–1 lead; Shawn Kelley gave up a two-out triple to third baseman Justin Turner that scored Kendrck and Ruiz to give Los Angeles a 4–1 lead; and finally Óliver Pérez induced a groundout by first baseman Adrián González to end the inning.

Washington mounted a comeback in the bottom of the seventh, when Espinosa led off with a walk and pinch-hitter Chris Heisey followed with a two-run homer off reliever Grant Dayton to cut the Dodgers' lead to 4–3. When first baseman Clint Robinson followed immediately with a single, Dodgers manager Dave Roberts made the unconventional move of bringing in closer Kenley Jansen to pitch in the seventh inning, something Jansen had not done since 2013. Although the Nats put pressure on Jansen, with Harper singling and Murphy intentionally walked to load the bases, Jansen struck out Rendon for the third out to preserve the Dodgers' lead. Jansen pitched into the ninth inning without giving up another hit, throwing 51 pitches – nine more than he ever had before. When Jansen tired in the bottom of the ninth, walking Harper and Werth with one out, Roberts made another unconventional move, bringing Clayton Kershaw - who had started Game 1 and, on short rest, Game 4 – in for the first save of his career. Kershaw got Murphy to pop out for the second out, and, with no one else left on the bench to face Kershaw, Baker sent rookie Wilmer Difo to the plate. Kershaw struck out the overmatched Difo to preserve a 4–3 win and give Los Angeles a 3–2 series victory. The Nationals were eliminated from the playoffs in the NLDS for the third time in five years, and the Dodgers advanced to face the Chicago Cubs in the 2016 National League Championship Series.

Team	1	2	3	4	5	6	7	8	9	R	H	E
Los Angeles	0	0	0	0	0	0	4	0	0	4	8	0
Washington	0	1	0	0	0	0	2	0	0	3	7	0
WP: Julio Urías (1–0) LP: Marc Rzepczynski (0–1) Sv: Clayton Kershaw (1); Home runs: LAD: Joc Pederson (1); WSH: Chris Heisey (1); Attendance: 43,936

=== Postseason rosters ===
Playoff rosters
National League Division Series

- Pitchers: 23 Marc Rzepczynski 27 Shawn Kelley 31 Max Scherzer 36 Sammy Solis 41 Joe Ross 43 Mark Melancon 45 Blake Treinen 46 Óliver Pérez 47 Gio González 49 Reynaldo López 57 Tanner Roark
- Catchers: 29 Pedro Severino 59 José Lobatón
- Infielders: 6 Anthony Rendon 8 Danny Espinosa 1 Wilmer Difo 10 Stephen Drew 11 Ryan Zimmerman 20 Daniel Murphy 25 Clint Robinson
- Outfielders: 3 Michael A. Taylor 7 Trea Turner 14 Chris Heisey 28 Jayson Werth 34 Bryce Harper

== Roster ==
2016 Washington Nationals
Roster
Pitchers: 18 Matt Belisle; 17 Sean Burnett; 22 A. J. Cole; 44 Lucas Giolito; 32 Koda Glover; 47 Gio González; 26 Trevor Gott; 33 Matt Grace; 27 Shawn Kelley; 38 Mat Latos; 49 Reynaldo López; 53 Rafael Martin; 43 Mark Melancon; 58 Jonathan Papelbon; 46 Óliver Pérez; 52 Yusmeiro Petit; 57 Tanner Roark; 41 Joe Ross; 23 Marc Rzepczynski; 31 Max Scherzer; 36 Sammy Solis; 37 Stephen Strasburg; 45 Blake Treinen; 73 Felipe Vázquez	Catchers: 59 José Lobatón; 40 Wilson Ramos; 29 Pedro Severino; Infielders: 1 Wilmer Difo; 10 Stephen Drew; 8 Danny Espinosa; 20 Daniel Murphy; 6 Anthony Rendon; 25 Clint Robinson; 11 Ryan Zimmerman	Outfielders: 21 Matt den Dekker; 48 Brian Goodwin; 34 Bryce Harper; 14 Chris Heisey; 9 Ben Revere; 3 Michael Taylor; 7 Trea Turner; 28 Jayson Werth; Other batters: 64 Spencer Kieboom	Manager: 12 Dusty Baker; Coaches: 54 Dan Firova (bullpen); 13 Bob Henley (third base); 24 Jacque Jones (assistant hitting); 15 Davey Lopes (first base); 51 Mike Maddux (pitching); 39 Rick Schu (hitting); 35 Chris Speier (bench)

== Statistics ==
=== Regular season ===
==== Batting ====
Note: G = Games played; AB = At bats; R = Runs; H = Hits; 2B = Doubles; 3B = Triples; HR = Home runs; RBI = Runs batted in; Avg. = Batting average; OBP = On-base percentage; SLG = Slugging percentage; SB = Stolen bases

Complete regular-season offensive statistics are available here.

Player	G	AB	R	H	2B	3B	HR	RBI	AVG	OBP	SLG	SB
Matt Belisle	40	4	0	0	0	0	0	0	.000	.000	.000	0
Sean Burnett	10	0	0	0	0	0	0	0	–	–	–	0
A. J. Cole	8	7	0	0	0	0	0	0	.000	.000	.000	0
Matt den Dekker	19	34	3	6	1	0	1	4	.176	.282	.294	1
Wilmer Difo	31	58	14	13	3	0	1	7	.276	.364	.379	3
Stephen Drew	70	143	24	38	11	1	8	21	.266	.339	.524	0
Danny Espinosa	157	516	66	108	15	0	24	72	.209	.306	.378	12
Lucas Giolito	6	4	1	1	0	0	0	0	.250	.250	.250	0
Koda Glover	19	0	0	0	0	0	0	0	–	–	–	0
Gio González	32	52	1	7	2	0	0	2	.135	.148	.173	0
Brian Goodwin	22	42	1	12	4	1	0	5	.286	.318	.429	0
Trevor Gott	9	0	0	0	0	0	0	0	–	–	–	0
Matt Grace	6	0	0	0	0	0	0	0	–	–	–	0
Bryce Harper	147	506	84	123	24	2	24	86	.243	.373	.441	21
Chris Heisey	83	139	18	30	3	1	9	17	.216	.290	.446	0
Shawn Kelley	67	1	0	0	0	0	0	0	.000	.000	.000	0
Spencer Kieboom	1	0	1	0	0	0	0	0	–	1.000	–	0
Mat Latos	6	3	1	1	0	0	1	1	.333	.333	1.333	0
José Lobatón	39	99	10	23	3	1	3	8	.232	.319	.374	0
Reynaldo Lopez	11	12	0	1	0	0	0	0	.083	.083	.083	0
Rafael Martin	8	0	0	0	0	0	0	0	–	–	–	0
Mark Melancon	30	0	0	0	0	0	0	0	–	–	–	0
Daniel Murphy	142	531	88	184	47	5	25	104	.347	.390	.595	5
Jonathan Papelbon	37	0	0	0	0	0	0	0	–	–	–	0
Óliver Pérez	64	3	1	2	1	0	0	0	.667	.667	1.000	0
Yusmeiro Petit	36	6	0	1	0	0	0	0	.167	.167	.167	0
Wilson Ramos	131	482	58	148	25	0	22	80	.307	.354	.496	0
Anthony Rendon	156	567	91	153	38	2	20	85	.270	.348	.450	12
Ben Revere	103	350	44	76	9	7	2	24	.217	.260	.300	14
Felipe Rivero	47	1	0	0	0	0	0	0	.000	.000	.000	0
Tanner Roark	34	54	1	8	1	0	0	3	.125	.188	.141	0
Clint Robinson	104	196	16	46	4	0	5	26	.235	.305	.332	0
Joe Ross	23	41	2	10	2	0	0	1	.244	.295	.293	0
Marc Rzepczynski	14	0	0	0	0	0	0	0	–	–	–	0
Max Scherzer	34	70	4	13	1	0	0	12	.186	.208	.200	0
Pedro Severino	16	28	6	9	2	0	2	4	.321	.441	.607	0
Sammy Solis	37	3	0	0	0	0	0	0	.000	.000	.000	0
Stephen Strasburg	24	48	3	10	1	0	0	2	.208	.240	.229	0
Michael A. Taylor	76	221	28	51	11	0	7	16	.231	.278	.376	14
Blake Treinen	73	0	0	0	0	0	0	0	–	–	–	0
Trea Turner	73	307	53	105	14	8	13	40	.342	.370	.567	33
Jayson Werth	143	525	84	128	26	0	21	69	.244	.335	.417	5
Ryan Zimmerman	115	427	60	93	18	1	15	46	.218	.272	.370	4
Team totals	162	5490	763	1403	268	29	203	735	.256	.326	.426	121

==== Pitching ====
Note: W = Wins; L = Losses; ERA = Earned run average; G = Games pitched; GS = Games started; SV = Saves; IP = Innings pitched; H = Hits allowed; R = Runs allowed; ER = Earned runs allowed; HR = Home runs allowed; BB = Walks allowed; K = Strikeouts

Complete regular-season pitching statistics are available here.

Player	W	L	ERA	G	GS	SV	IP	H	R	ER	HR	BB	K
Matt Belisle	0	0	1.76	40	0	0	46.0	43	13	9	2	7	32
Sean Burnett	0	0	3.18	10	0	0	5.2	5	2	2	1	1	3
A. J. Cole	1	2	5.17	8	8	0	38.1	37	24	22	7	14	39
Lucas Giolito	0	1	6.75	6	4	0	21.1	26	18	16	7	12	11
Koda Glover	2	0	5.03	19	0	0	19.2	15	12	11	3	7	16
Gio González	11	11	4.57	32	32	0	177.1	179	98	90	19	59	171
Trevor Gott	0	0	1.50	9	0	0	6.0	6	1	1	0	3	6
Matt Grace	0	0	0.00	5	0	0	3.0	1	0	0	0	0	4
Shawn Kelley	3	2	2.64	67	0	7	58.0	41	19	17	9	11	80
Mat Latos	1	1	6.52	6	1	0	9.2	11	7	7	1	5	10
Reynaldo López	5	2	4.91	11	6	0	44.0	47	27	24	4	22	42
Rafael Martin	0	0	2.45	8	0	0	3.2	0	1	1	0	1	5
Mark Melancon	1	1	1.82	30	0	17	29.2	21	6	6	1	3	27
Jonathan Papelbon	2	4	4.37	37	0	19	35.0	37	18	17	3	14	31
Óliver Pérez	2	3	4.95	64	0	0	40.0	38	22	22	4	20	46
Yusmeiro Petit	3	5	4.50	36	1	1	62.0	67	33	31	12	15	49
Felipe Rivero	0	3	4.53	47	0	1	49.2	43	26	25	4	15	53
Tanner Roark	16	10	2.83	34	44	0	210.0	173	72	66	17	73	172
Joe Ross	7	5	3.43	19	19	0	105.0	108	43	40	9	29	93
Mark Rzepczynski	0	0	1.54	14	0	0	11.2	8	3	2	0	5	9
Max Scherzer	20	7	2.96	34	34	0	228.1	165	77	75	31	56	284
Sammy Solis	2	4	2.41	37	0	0	41.0	31	12	11	1	21	47
Stephen Strasburg	15	4	3.60	24	24	0	147.2	119	59	59	15	44	183
Blake Treinen	4	1	2.28	73	0	1	67.0	51	19	17	5	31	63
Team totals	95	67	3.51	162	162	46	1459.2	1272	612	570	155	468	1476

==== Team leaders ====
Qualifying players only.

===== Batting =====
Stat	Player	Total
Avg.	Daniel Murphy	.347
HR	Daniel Murphy	25
RBI	Daniel Murphy	104
R	Anthony Rendon	91
H	Daniel Murphy	184
SB	Trea Turner	33

===== Pitching =====
Stat	Player	Total
W	Max Scherzer	20
L	Gio González	11
ERA	Tanner Roark	2.83
SO	Max Scherzer	284
SV	Jonathan Papelbon	19
IP	Max Scherzer	228.1

=== Postseason ===
==== Batting ====
Note: G = Games played; AB = At bats; R = Runs; H = Hits; 2B = Doubles; 3B = Triples; HR = Home runs; RBI = Runs batted in; Avg. = Batting average; OBP = On-base percentage; SLG = Slugging percentage; SB = Stolen bases

Complete postseason offensive statistics are available here.

Player	G	AB	R	H	2B	3B	HR	RBI	AVG	OBP	SLG	SB
Wilmer Difo	2	2	0	0	0	0	0	0	.000	.000	.000	0
Stephen Drew	4	4	0	0	0	0	0	0	.000	.000	.000	0
Danny Espinosa	5	14	3	2	0	0	0	1	.143	.333	.143	0
Gio González	1	2	0	0	0	0	0	0	.000	.000	.000	0
Bryce Harper	5	17	4	4	1	0	0	1	.235	.458	.294	3
Chris Heisey	5	4	1	1	0	0	1	3	.250	.200	1.000	0
Shawn Kelley	2	0	0	0	0	0	0	0	–	–	–	0
José Lobatón	4	9	1	2	0	0	1	3	.222	.222	.556	0
Reynaldo López	1	0	0	0	0	0	0	0	–	–	–	0
Mark Melancon	4	0	0	0	0	0	0	0	–	–	–	0
Daniel Murphy	5	16	3	7	0	0	0	6	.438	.545	.438	2
Óliver Pérez	4	0	0	0	0	0	0	0	–	–	–	0
Anthony Rendon	5	20	1	3	0	0	1	4	.150	.190	.300	0
Tanner Roark	1	2	0	0	0	0	0	0	.000	.000	.000	0
Clint Robinson	3	3	0	2	1	0	0	0	.667	.667	1.000	0
Joe Ross	2	1	0	0	0	0	0	0	.000	.000	.000	0
Marc Rzepczynski	3	0	0	0	0	0	0	0	–	–	–	0
Max Scherzer	2	4	0	0	0	0	0	0	.000	.000	.000	0
Pedro Severino	4	10	1	1	1	0	0	0	.100	.100	.200	0
Sammy Solis	5	0	0	0	0	0	0	0	–	–	–	0
Michael Taylor	3	2	0	0	0	0	0	0	.000	.000	.000	0
Blake Treinen	3	0	0	0	0	0	0	0	–	–	–	0
Trea Turner	5	22	5	7	0	0	0	1	.318	.333	.318	2
Jayson Werth	5	18	4	7	2	0	1	3	.389	.522	.667	1
Ryan Zimmerman	5	17	1	6	2	0	0	2	.353	.450	.471	0

==== Pitching ====
Note: W = Wins; L = Losses; ERA = Earned run average; G = Games pitched; GS = Games started; SV = Saves; IP = Innings pitched; H = Hits allowed; R = Runs allowed; ER = Earned runs allowed; HR = Home runs allowed; BB = Walks allowed; K = Strikeouts

Complete postseason pitching statistics are available

Player	W	L	ERA	G	GS	SV	IP	H	R	ER	HR	BB	K
Gio González	0	0	6.23	1	1	0	4.1	4	3	3	1	1	4
Shawn Kelley	0	0	0.00	2	0	0	1.2	1	0	0	0	0	3
Reynaldo López	0	0	4.50	1	0	0	2.0	2	1	1	0	1	3
Mark Melancon	0	0	0.00	4	0	1	4.1	3	0	0	0	2	5
Óliver Pérez	0	0	0.00	4	0	0	3.1	1	0	0	0	1	3
Tanner Roark	0	0	4.15	1	1	0	4.1	7	2	2	1	3	1
Joe Ross	0	0	13.50	1	1	0	2.2	3	4	4	1	2	3
Mark Rzepczynski	0	1	4.50	3	0	0	2.0	0	1	1	0	4	3
Max Scherzer	0	1	3.75	2	2	0	12.0	10	5	5	2	2	12
Sammy Solis	1	0	1.93	1	0	0	4.2	3	1	1	0	2	2
Blake Treinen	1	1	6.75	3	0	0	2.2	3	2	2	0	0	5

== Awards and honors ==
=== All-Stars ===
- Bryce Harper, OF
- Daniel Murphy, 2B
- Wilson Ramos, C
- Stephen Strasburg, P
- Max Scherzer, P

The 2016 Nationals sent five players to the 2016 Major League Baseball All-Star Game; in the National League, only the Chicago Cubs had more players selected for the game, with seven. The Nationals set a new team record for the number of players selected for the Major League Baseball All-Star Game since the franchise relocated to Washington in 2005; previously, the record for Nationals in an all-star game was four, in 2012.

The selection of four Nationals players was announced on July 5:

- Bryce Harper was voted in as a starting outfielder for the game, with 2,865,095 fan votes, his fourth all-star selection; his previous selections were in 2012, 2013, and 2015. It was his third all-star start and the third time he had been voted in as a starter.
- Daniel Murphy was selected as a reserve second baseman. It was his second all-star selection, the first having been in 2014 when he was with the New York Mets. He narrowly missed being voted in as a starter, losing in fan voting to Ben Zobrist of the Chicago Cubs 3,013,407 to 3,013,319, a difference of only 88 votes.
- Wilson Ramos was selected as a reserve catcher for the National League All-Star Team, his first all-star selection. He finished third in fan voting, which Buster Posey of the San Francisco Giants won.
- Stephen Strasburg was selected as a pitcher. It was his second all-star selection, the first having been in 2012. On July 8, Major League Baseball announced that Strasburg would not be available to pitch in the all-star game. Nationals general manager Mike Rizzo and manager Dusty Baker explained that Strasburg, in consultation with the Nationals, had decided not to pitch because he recently had come off the disabled list after a back injury. Strasburg traveled to the game and participated in festivities.

At the same time it announced Strasburg's unavailability, Major League Baseball announced that Max Scherzer had replaced him on the National League roster. It was Scherzer's fourth overall and fourth consecutive all-star selection; he previously had been selected for the American League roster representing the Detroit Tigers in 2013 and 2014 and for the National League team representing the Nationals in 2015.

=== Annual awards ===
==== Players' Choice Award ====
On November 9, 2016, Daniel Murphy received the Players' Choice Award for Outstanding Player in the National League. In 2016, Murphy led the National League with a .595 slugging percentage, .985 on-base-plus-slugging percentage, and 47 doubles, and his .347 batting average was second only to that of DJ LeMahieu, who hit .348 for the Colorado Rockies. Murphy hit 25 home runs and had 104 runs batted in and a .390 on-base percentage. During the seven-game 2016 National League Division Series against the Los Angeles Dodgers, he had a .438 batting average and drove in six runs.

==== Silver Slugger ====
- Daniel Murphy, 2B
- Wilson Ramos, C

On November 10, 2016, it was announced that Daniel Murphy and Wilson Ramos had won the National League Silver Slugger Award for their respective positions. It was the first time either of them had won a Silver Slugger. It was the fifth season in a row, and the seventh time in eight seasons, that at least one National won a Silver Slugger

During the 2016 season, Murphy finished in the top two among National League second basemen in every major offensive category: He was first in home runs (25), runs batted in (104), slugging percentage (.595), and wins above replacement (5.5) and second in batting average (.347) and on-base percentage (.390). His lowest monthly on-base-plus slugging percentage (OPS) in 2016 was .830, and his OPS exceeded 1.000 in three different months. He was the National League Player of the Month for both May and July 2016.

Ramos played in a career-high 131 games in 2016. Among National League catchers, he finished first in slugging percentage (.496), tied for first in runs batted in (80), second in home runs (22), and third in on-base percentage (.354).

==== Cy Young Award ====
On November 16, 2016, the Baseball Writers' Association of America named Max Scherzer the winner of the 2016 National League Cy Young Award. Scherzer won the award in a landslide, receiving 25 of the 30 first-place votes and 192 points. It was Scherzer's second Cy Young; his first had come in 2013 when he pitched in the American League for the Detroit Tigers. He became only the sixth pitcher in history to win the award in each league, and the first to so since Roger Clemens in 2004. (Note: The previous pitchers to win the Cy Young Award in both the National League and the American League were Gaylord Perry with the Cleveland Indians in 1972 and the San Diego Padres in 1978; Pedro Martínez with the Montreal Expos in 1997 and the Boston Red Sox in 1999 and 2000; Randy Johnson with the Seattle Mariners in 1995 and the Arizona Diamondbacks in 1999, 2000, 2001, and 2002; Roy Halladay with the Toronto Blue Jays in 2003 and the Philadelphia Phillies in 2010; and Roger Clemens with the Boston Red Sox in 1986, 1987, and 1991, the Toronto Blue Jays in 1997 and 1998, the New York Yankees in 2001, and the Houston Astros in 2004. (See Axisa, Mike, "MLB Awards: Nationals' Max Scherzer named 2016 NL Cy Young winner," cbssports.com, November 16, 2016 and Anonymous, "Double the Dominance," The Washington Post, November 17, 2016, Page D1.))

During the 2016 regular season, Scherzer posted a record of 20–7 – the only National League pitcher to win 20 games – and had an ERA of 2.96, a FIP (fielding-independent pitching) of 3.24, and an ERA+ of 141 in 228 1/3 innings, as well as a rating of 6.2 Wins Above Replacement (WAR). He led all of Major League Baseball in strikeouts with 284, a Washington Nationals single-season record, (Note: The Montreal-Washington franchise record for strikeouts in a season was 305 by Pedro Martínez with the Montreal Expos in 1997. The single-season strikeout record for any Washington, D.C., Major League Baseball pitcher was 313 by Walter Johnson for the original Washington Senators in 1910; Johnson also had 303 strikeouts for the Senators in 1912. (See Anonymous, "Max Scherzer's case for the Cy Young award," The Washington Post, November 17, 2016, Page D5.)) as well as in walks plus hits per inning pitched (WHIP) with 0.97 and swinging strikes (15.3 percent). He led the National League in wins, innings pitched, WAR, and strikeout-to-walk ratio (5.07). He struck out 20 batters in a game against the Detroit Tigers at Nationals Park on May 11, 2016, becoming only the fifth pitcher in Major League Baseball history to strike out at least 20 batters in a nine-inning game. He finished second in batting average against (.196) and seventh in ERA. For the 2010 through 2016 seasons, Scherzer was first among Major League Baseball pitchers in both wins and strikeouts.

Scherzer's award was the second Cy Young won by a Montreal-Washington franchise player and the first since Pedro Martínez won it in 1997 for the Montreal Expos. It was the first Cy Young ever won by a player for any Washington, D.C., Major League Baseball team.

==== Esurance MLB Awards ====
- Best Pitcher: Max Scherzer
- Best Performance: Max Scherzer

On November 18, 2016, Max Scherzer was revealed as the winner of two Esurance MLB Awards for 2016, for Best Pitcher and for Best Performance. For the Best Pitcher award, MLB described Scherzer as "one of baseball's top strikeout artists" and said that he "continued to overpower big-league hitters with regularity during 2016," highlighting his 20–7 record, 284 strikeouts, 2.96 ERA, and 0.97 walks and hits per inning pitched (WHIP) in 228 1/3 innings. For the Best Performance award, MLB cited his "historic level of dominance" in becoming "just the fourth pitcher ever to notch 20 strikeouts in a nine-inning game" in his complete-game outing against the Detroit Tigers at Nationals Park on May 11, 2016, noting that during the game he gave up two runs on six hits and walked no one.

==== Comeback Player of the Year ====
On November 29, 2016, Major League Baseball announced that Anthony Rendon had won the 2016 National League Major League Baseball Comeback Player of the Year. In 2014, Rendon had finished fifth in National League Mst Valuable Player voting and had a batting average of .287, on-base percentage of .351, and slugging percentage of .473 with 39 doubles, 21 home runs, and 83 runs batted in. A severe knee bruise, oblique strain, and quadriceps injury had forced him to miss much of the 2015 season, and his poor performance when he did play that season – he hit only .264 with an on-base percentage of .344 and a slugging percentage of .363 with just 16 doubles, 5 home runs, and 25 RBIs in just 355 plate appearances – raised doubts about his ability to recover and return to the form he had shown in 2014. In 2016, however, he put those doubts to rest, hitting 20 home runs, driving in 85 runs, hitting .270 with a .348 on-base percentage and a.450 slugging percentage, leading all National League third baseman in doubles with 38 and in fielding percentage (.976), and being named a Gold Glove Award finalist. In the second half of the season, he had a batting average of .291 and an on-base-plus-slugging percentage of .866.

Although Dmitri Young had won the Players Choice Award for Comeback Player of the Year as a National in 2007, Rendon became the first player in Montreal-Washington franchise history to win the Major League Baseball Comeback Player of the Year Award.

== Farm system ==
Level	Team	League	Manager
AAA	Syracuse Chiefs	International League	Billy Gardner Jr.
AA	Harrisburg Senators	Eastern League	Matthew LeCroy
A-Advanced	Potomac Nationals	Carolina League	Tripp Keister
A	Hagerstown Suns	South Atlantic League	Patrick Anderson
A-Short Season	Auburn Doubledays	New York–Penn League	Jerad Head
Rookie	GCL Nationals	Gulf Coast League	Josh Johnson
Rookie	DSL Nationals	Dominican Summer League	Sandy Martinez
