= Brian Goodwin (baseball) =

American baseball player (born 1990)

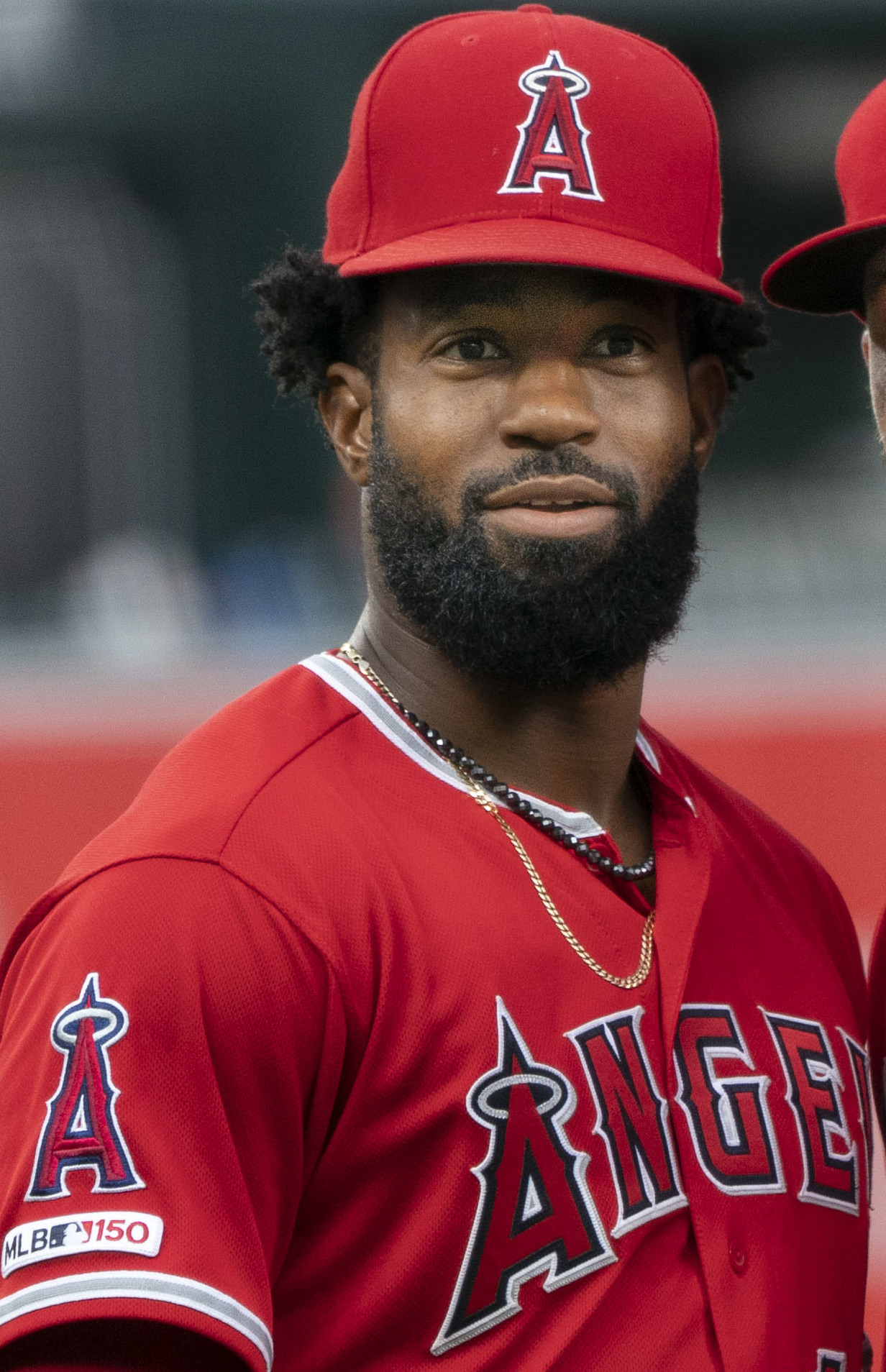
- Goodwin with the Los Angeles Angels in 2019
- Outfielder
- Born: November 2, 1990 (age 35); Rocky Mount, North Carolina, U.S.
- Batted: Left Threw: Right

Professional debut
- MLB: August 6, 2016, for the Washington Nationals
- CPBL: August 20, 2022, for the Wei Chuan Dragons

Last appearance
- MLB: September 23, 2021, for the Chicago White Sox
- CPBL: October 25, 2022, for the Wei Chuan Dragons

MLB statistics
- Batting average: .244
- Home runs: 50
- Runs batted in: 158

CPBL statistics
- Batting average: .245
- Home runs: 0
- Runs batted in: 11
- Stats at Baseball Reference

Teams
- Washington Nationals (2016–2018); Kansas City Royals (2018); Los Angeles Angels (2019–2020); Cincinnati Reds (2020); Chicago White Sox (2021); Wei Chuan Dragons (2022)

Brian Christopher Goodwin (born November 2, 1990) is an American former professional baseball outfielder. He has previously played in Major League Baseball (MLB) for the Washington Nationals, Kansas City Royals, Los Angeles Angels, Cincinnati Reds, and Chicago White Sox. He has also played in the Chinese Professional Baseball League (CPBL) for the Wei Chuan Dragons. Before his professional career, Goodwin played college baseball for the North Carolina Tar Heels.

== Amateur career ==
Born and raised in Rocky Mount, North Carolina, Goodwin attended Rocky Mount High School where he was a three-sport athlete in baseball, football, and basketball. Goodwin was named Gatorade North Carolina Baseball Player of the Year during his senior season, and also received All-Conference honors in football as a cornerback and kick returner. He helped lead the Rocky Mount baseball team to the 2008 North Carolina 3A state title and was named MVP of the 3A championship series.

Goodwin attended the University of North Carolina at Chapel Hill, where he hit .291, tied the school record for triples in a single season, led the team in RBIs, and was named a Louisville Slugger Freshman All-American. However, Goodwin transferred to Miami-Dade College, due to issues with grades. As a sophomore at Miami-Dade, Goodwin hit .382 with a .500 on-base percentage. In 2010, he played collegiate summer baseball with the Harwich Mariners of the Cape Cod Baseball League. Goodwin committed to play baseball at the University of South Carolina following the 2011 season.

== Professional career ==
=== Washington Nationals ===
Goodwin was drafted by the Chicago White Sox in the 17th round of the 2009 Major League Baseball draft out of Rocky Mount High School in Rocky Mount, North Carolina. He did not sign and attended the University of North Carolina at Chapel Hill. He was then drafted by the Washington Nationals in the first round of the 2011 Major League Baseball draft. Goodwin joined the Auburn Doubledays along with other draft picks for the 2011 season, but was not added to the active roster.

Prior to the 2012 season, Baseball America ranked Goodwin as the Nationals fifth best prospect. Goodwin made his debut that year for the Single-A Hagerstown Suns. He was promoted to Double-A Harrisburg Senators after hitting .324/.438/.542 with nine home runs and 38 runs batted in. At Harrisburg he hit .223/.306/.373 with five home runs. After the season, he played in the Arizona Fall League and was the MVP of the Rising Stars Game.

Prior to the 2013 season, Goodwin was ranked as the Nationals third best prospect by Baseball America. He was also ranked as the 52nd best prospect in baseball by MLB.com.

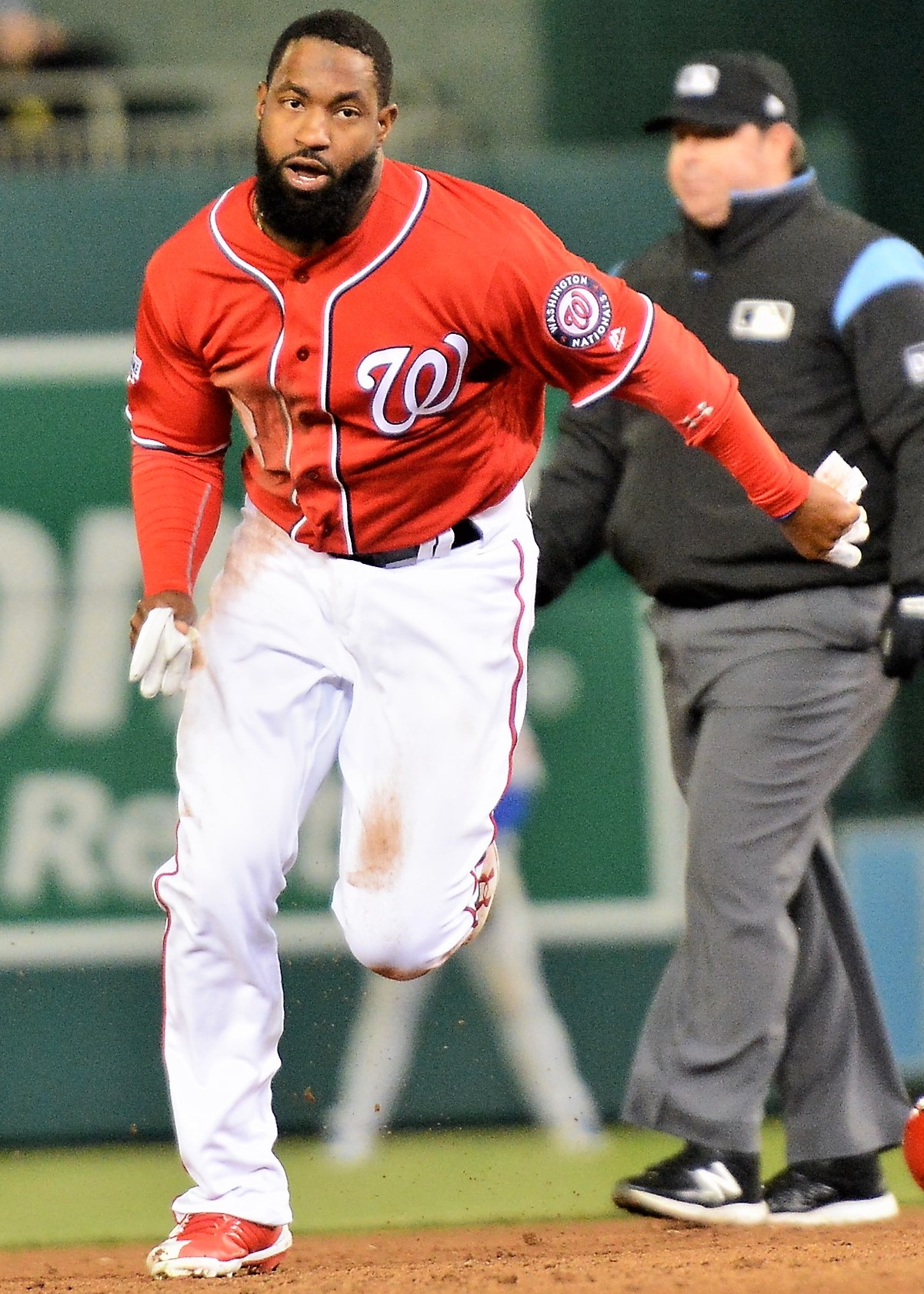
Goodwin with the Washington Nationals in 2018

He was called up to the Nationals in August 2016 after hitting .284 in the minor leagues. On August 10, 2016, Goodwin connected for his first major league hit, a single, against the Cleveland Indians. After starting the 2017 season with the Triple-A Syracuse Chiefs, Goodwin was promoted to the majors in May, taking the place of injured outfielder Chris Heisey. Goodwin hit his first major league home run on June 2, 2017, at the Oakland Coliseum, connecting for a two-run shot to right-center off Oakland Athletics relief pitcher Zach Neal, amid a four-hit outburst that marked his best day at the plate in his major league career to that point. On July 27, 2017, Goodwin touched off back-to-back-to-back-to-back home runs for the Nationals against Michael Blazek of the Milwaukee Brewers, hitting a two-run shot that scored pitcher Max Scherzer from first base to begin the onslaught. It was the first time the feat had been accomplished in Major League Baseball since the 2011 season.

=== Kansas City Royals ===
On July 22, 2018, the Nationals traded Goodwin to the Kansas City Royals in exchange for minor league pitcher Jacob Condra-Bogan. In 27 appearances for Kansas City, he batted .266/.317/.415 with three home runs and 13 RBI. Goodwin was released by the Royals on March 25, 2019.

=== Los Angeles Angels ===
On March 27, 2019, Goodwin was claimed off release waivers by the Los Angeles Angels. In 2019 with the Angels, Goodwin appeared in 136 contests, hitting .262/.346/.470 with 17 home runs and 47 RBI, both career highs. In 2020, Goodwin was the Opening Day starting right fielder for the Angels, and got a hit and an RBI in 3 at-bats.

=== Cincinnati Reds ===
On August 31, 2020, Goodwin was traded to the Cincinnati Reds for Packy Naughton and Jose Salvador. On September 1, he made his debut for the Reds, going 1-for-3 with a double. On December 2, Goodwin was non-tendered by the Reds.

=== Chicago White Sox ===
On February 11, 2021, Goodwin signed a minor league contract with the Pittsburgh Pirates that included an invitation to spring training. On May 3, Goodwin was released by the Pirates without making an appearance for the organization.

On May 4, 2021, Goodwin signed a minor league contract with the Chicago White Sox. On June 10, Goodwin was selected to the active roster. On June 12, he made his White Sox debut and notched a three-run homer with five RBI in the game. He became the 38th player in White Sox history to hit a home run in his White Sox debut. On August 1, Goodwin hit his first career walk-off hit with a home run off of Nick Wittgren of the Cleveland Indians to win the game 2–1. He finished the season batting .221/.319/.374 with 8 home runs and 29 RBI in 72 games. On November 5, Goodwin was outrighted off of the 40-man roster and elected free agency.

=== Leones de Yucatán ===
On May 4, 2022, Goodwin signed with the Leones de Yucatán of the Mexican League. In 32 games, he batted .239/.350/.436 with six home runs and 19 RBI. Goodwin was released by the Leones on June 14.

=== Wei Chuan Dragons ===
On August 18, 2022, Goodwin signed with the Wei Chuan Dragons of the Chinese Professional Baseball League. In 26 contests for the Dragons, he batted .245/.265/.306 with 11 RBI and one stolen base. Goodwin became a free agent following the season.

=== Long Island Ducks ===
On May 23, 2023, Goodwin signed with the Long Island Ducks of the Atlantic League of Professional Baseball. In 59 games, he slashed .277/.385/.514 with 12 home runs and 38 RBI. Goodwin became a free agent following the season.
