= Spencer Kieboom =

Dutch-American baseball player (born 1991)

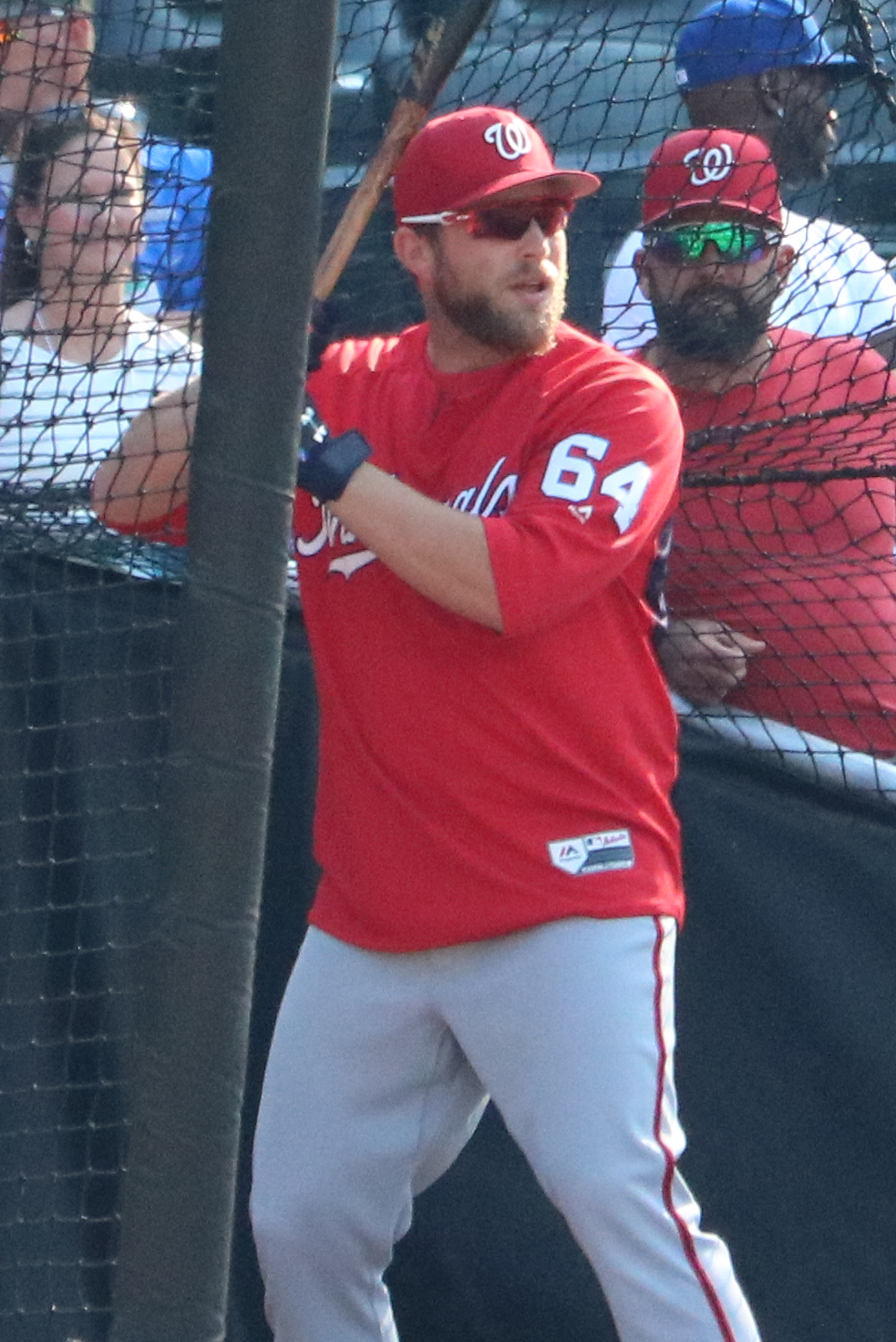
- Kieboom with the Nationals in 2018
- Catcher / First baseman
- Born: March 16, 1991 (age 35); Mount Pleasant, South Carolina, U.S.
- Batted: Right Threw: Right

MLB debut
- October 2, 2016, for the Washington Nationals

Last MLB appearance
- September 30, 2018, for the Washington Nationals

MLB statistics
- Batting average: .232
- Home runs: 2
- Runs batted in: 13
- Stats at Baseball Reference

Teams
- Washington Nationals (2016, 2018)

Spencer John Kieboom (/ˈkiːbuːm/ KEE-boom; born March 16, 1991) is a Dutch-American former professional baseball catcher. He played in Major League Baseball (MLB) for the Washington Nationals.

== Career ==
=== Amateur career ===
After graduating from George Walton Comprehensive High School, Kieboom played college baseball at Clemson University. In 2011, he played collegiate summer baseball with the Falmouth Commodores of the Cape Cod Baseball League.

=== Draft and minor leagues ===
The Washington Nationals selected Kieboom in the fifth round of the 2012 Major League Baseball draft. He played for the Auburn Doubledays in the Class A-Short Season New York-Penn League in 2012, batting .258 with 20 runs batted in (RBIs) in 41 games. He suffered an injury that required him to undergo ulnar collateral ligament reconstruction, popularly known as Tommy John surgery in 2013, forcing him to scrap plans to play for the Netherlands in the 2013 World Baseball Classic and to miss virtually the entire 2013 season, although he did play in four games with the Gulf Coast League Nationals in the rookie-level Gulf Coast League (GCL) late in the year, going 2-for-6 at the plate with one RBI. He thus played a small part in a year in which the GCL Nationals finished their regular season with a record of 49–9, giving them an .845 winning percentage that was the highest winning percentage for a full regular season ever achieved by an American Minor League Baseball team. The Nationals then won all three of their playoff games, defeating the GCL Pirates in a single-game semifinal playoff and sweeping the GCL Red Sox in the best-of-three league championship series, to become the 2013 GCL champions.

Kieboom played for the Hagerstown Suns in the Class A South Atlantic League in 2014, appearing in 87 games and hitting .309, with 61 RBIs and nine home runs, the first home runs of his professional career. In the fall of 2014, he played for the Mesa Solar Sox in the Arizona Fall League, batting .324 in 10 games with a home run and seven RBIs. He spent 2015 with the Potomac Nationals in the Class A-Advanced Carolina League, where he played in 71 games and hit .248 with two home runs and 21 RBIs. He returned to the Arizona Fall League in the fall of 2015, playing in 13 games for the Salt River Rafters and hitting .238, with two homers and seven runs driven in. The Washington Nationals added him to their 40-man roster in November 2015.

Kieboom was promoted to the Harrisburg Senators of the Double-A Eastern League for the 2016 season, hitting .230 in 94 games with five home runs and 31 RBIs.

=== Major leagues ===
Kieboom went home to Georgia after the conclusion of the Eastern League season, but three weeks later the Nationals promoted him to the major leagues for the first time on September 27, 2016, after an injury to starting catcher Wilson Ramos. Kieboom was on the Nationals′ roster for six days, and he had one plate appearance, drawing a walk and scoring a run in the team's regular season finale on October 2, thus ending his first stint in the majors with 1.000 on-base percentage.

During spring training in 2017, the Nationals designated Kieboom for assignment on March 2, then outrighted him to the Syracuse Chiefs of the Triple-A International League on March 6 before assigning him to Double-A Harrisburg, where he began the season. After he hit .183 in 19 games with Harrisburg, slugging two home runs and driving in six runs, he was promoted to Triple-A and spent the rest of the season with Syracuse, appearing in 47 games and hitting .275 with three home runs and 19 RBIs. He finished the 2017 season with an overall batting average for the year of .250, with five home runs and 25 RBIs.

The Nationals invited Kieboom to major league spring training in 2018 as a non-roster invitee. Despite not appearing in a regular-season professional game at any position other than catcher, Kieboom took the field more than once during 2018 spring training as a first baseman. He began the season with Syracuse and appeared in 25 games with the Chiefs, batting .250, hitting a home run, and driving in 10 runs while appearing as both a catcher and occasional first baseman before the Nationals called him up to the major leagues on May 11 after starting catcher Matt Wieters suffered an injury and went on the 10-day disabled list. During the first game of a doubleheader against the Los Angeles Dodgers at Nationals Park in Washington, D.C., on May 19, Kieboom had his first career major-league start, and in the third inning he notched his first major-league hit, singling off of Dodgers starter Ross Stripling. On September 11, 2018, Kieboom hit his first career home run while facing Philadelphia Phillies pitcher Nick Pivetta.

Kieboom spent the 2019 season with Harrisburg, hitting .196/.271/.256/.527 with 1 home run and 14 RBI. On October 21, 2019, the Nationals outrighted Kieboom off their 40-man roster. He elected free agency on October 24 and later decided to retire.

== Personal life ==
Kieboom was born in Mount Pleasant, South Carolina, and holds dual nationality with the United States and the Netherlands. He has two younger brothers: Carter, who also played for the Nationals, and Trevor, who played baseball for the University of Georgia and later became a sports agent. His Dutch-born father, Alswinn Kieboom, played baseball for HCAW in the Netherlands' top baseball league and for Eastern Illinois University.
