= Wilmer Difo =

Dominican baseball player (born 1992)

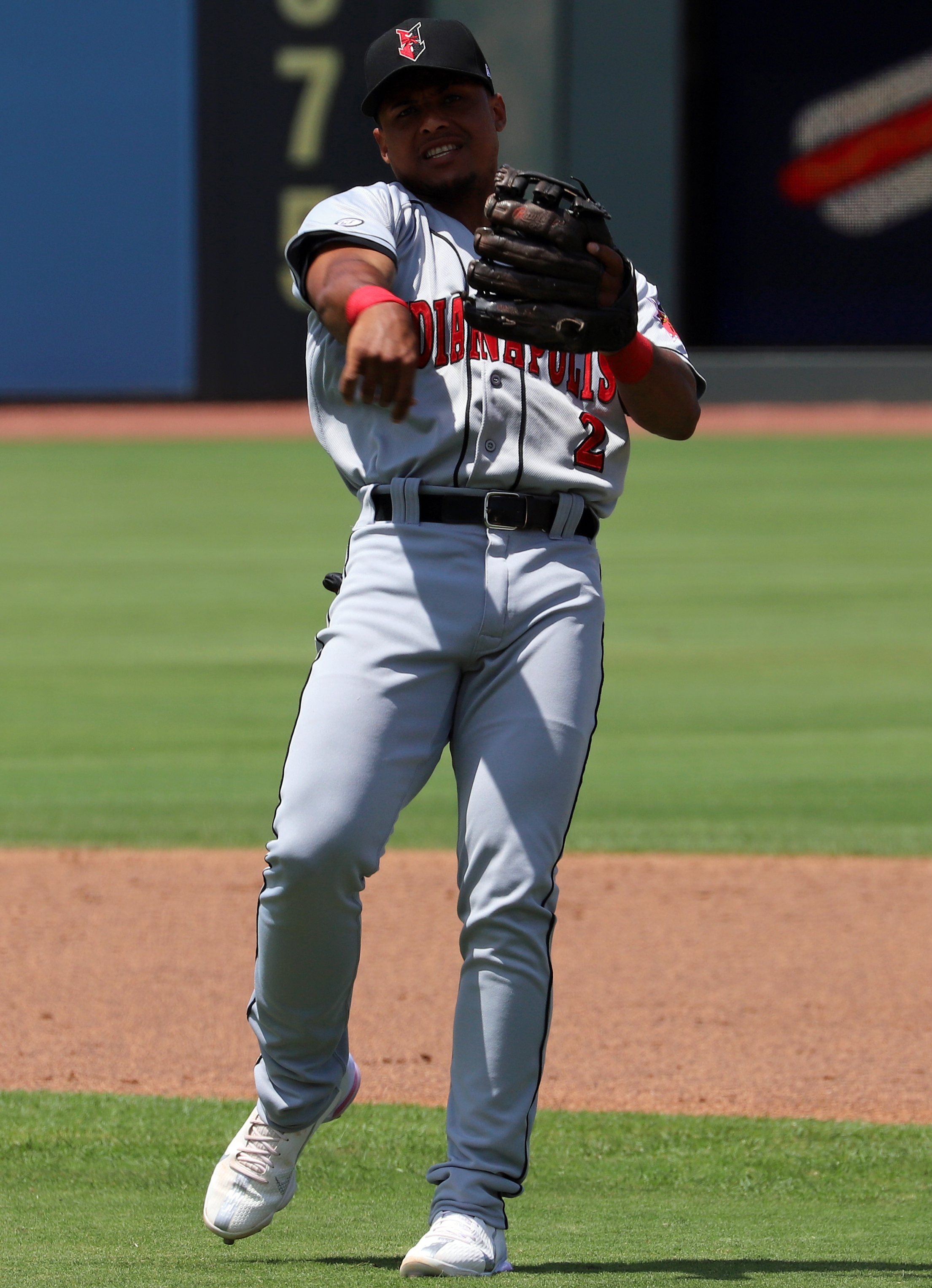
- Difo with the Indianapolis Indians in 2021

Long Island Ducks – No. 29
- Second baseman / Shortstop
- Born: April 2, 1992 (age 34); Santiago de los Caballeros, Dominican Republic
- Bats: Switch Throws: Right

MLB debut
- May 19, 2015, for the Washington Nationals

MLB statistics (through 2022 season)
- Batting average: .250
- Home runs: 19
- Runs batted in: 103
- Stats at Baseball Reference

Teams
- Washington Nationals (2015–2020); Pittsburgh Pirates (2021); Arizona Diamondbacks (2022)

Wilmer Francisco Difo (born April 2, 1992) is a Dominican professional baseball infielder for the Long Island Ducks of the Atlantic League of Professional Baseball. Difo made his Major League Baseball (MLB) debut in 2015 with the Washington Nationals and has also played for the Pittsburgh Pirates. He has made the majority of his major league appearances as a second baseman, shortstop, or third baseman, with more limited stints as an outfielder.

== Career ==
=== Washington Nationals ===
Difo signed with the Washington Nationals as an international free agent on June 3, 2010. He made his professional debut that season for the Dominican Summer League Nationals. From 2010 to 2013, he played for the Gulf Coast Nationals, Auburn Doubledays, Hagerstown Suns and Potomac Nationals. Difo played the 2014 season with Hagerstown. He was named the 2014 South Atlantic League Most Valuable Player (MVP) with a .315 batting average, a .360 on-base percentage and a .470 slugging average, with 14 home runs and 90 runs batted in. He received the Bob Boone Award from the Nationals, which "recognizes professionalism and passion". Difo started 2015 with the Potomac Nationals and was promoted to the Double-A Harrisburg Senators after 19 games.

On May 19, 2015, Difo was called up to the major leagues for the first time and collected his first hit in his first at-bat the same day, a pinch-hit single up the middle off New York Yankees reliever David Carpenter. Difo hit his first career home run on September 29, 2016, off Arizona Diamondbacks starter and former Nationals pitching prospect Robbie Ray. On October 14, 2016, he struck out for the game's last out as a pinch hitter as the Los Angeles Dodgers defeated the Nationals 4–3 to win the National League Division Series.

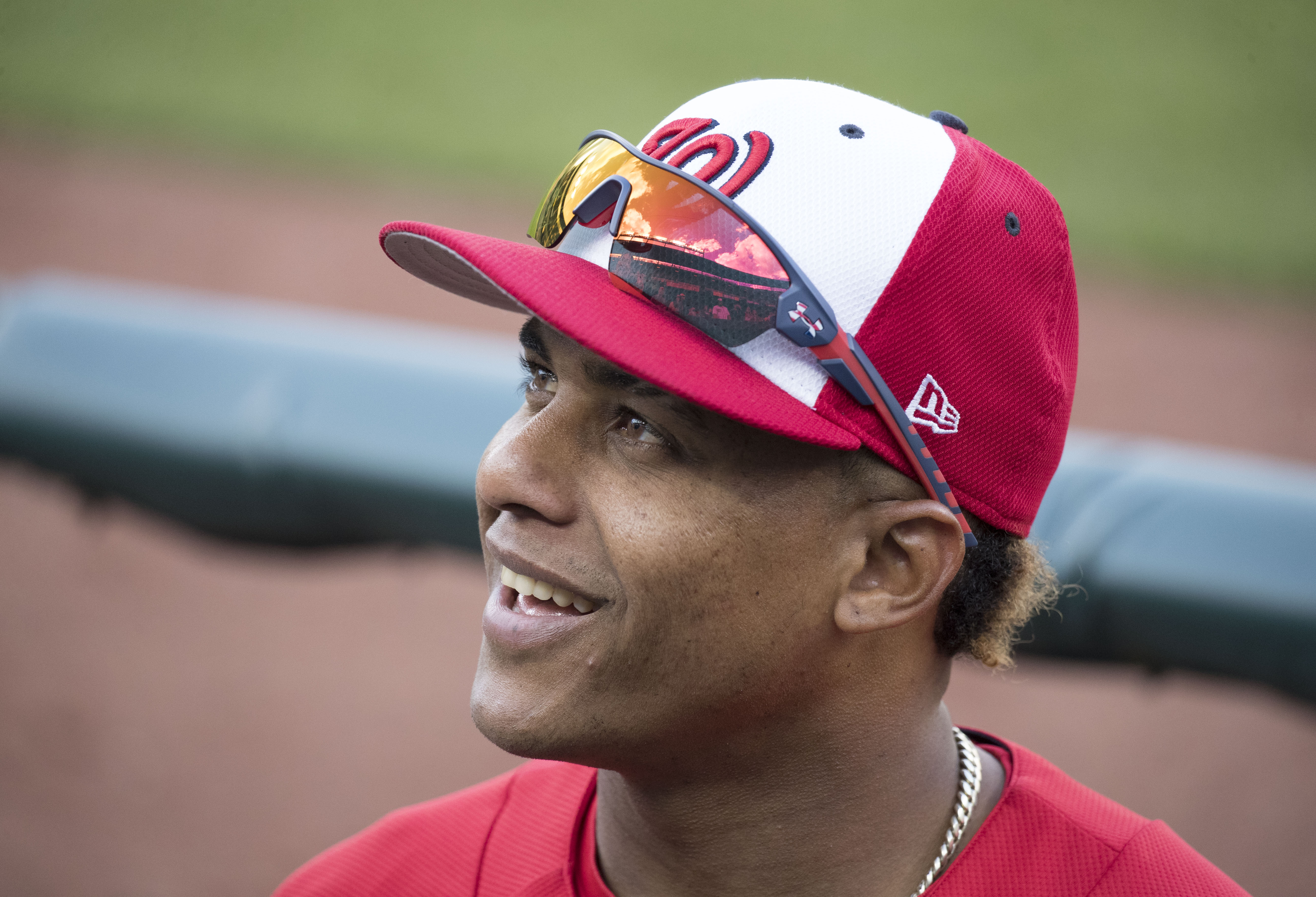
Difo with the Washington Nationals in 2017

Difo received his first career start in the outfield on June 24, 2017, playing center field against the Cincinnati Reds due to an injury to regular center fielder Michael A. Taylor. After Trea Turner suffered a broken wrist in a game days later, Difo took over as the Nationals' regular starting shortstop, occasionally sharing duties with Stephen Drew and Adrián Sánchez. On July 27, 2017, Difo hit one of four consecutive home runs by Nationals hitters off Milwaukee Brewers starter Michael Blazek, the first time the feat had been accomplished in Major League Baseball since the 2011 season.

Splitting time between the Majors and Minors in 2019, Difo appeared in 43 games with the Nationals and had a .252 average with two home runs and eight RBIs. The Nationals finished the year with a 93–69 record, able to clinch a wild card spot. Difo did not play in the postseason, but was on the Nationals' 40-man roster when the team won the 2019 World Series over the Houston Astros, their first championship in franchise history.

On September 5, 2020, Difo was designated for assignment by the Nationals. He cleared waivers and was assigned to the team's alternate training site in Fredericksburg, Virginia. Difo elected free agency on October 13, 2020.

=== Pittsburgh Pirates ===
On January 15, 2021, Difo signed a minor league contract with the Pittsburgh Pirates organization. On April 4, 2021, Difo was selected to the 40-man roster to fill in for Ke'Bryan Hayes, who was suffering from left wrist inflammation. On May 22, 2021, against the Atlanta Braves, Difo pitched one inning in a blowout, giving up eight runs on six hits, including a grand slam. It was his first career pitching appearance. On June 8, Difo was designated for assignment after posting a .244/.287/.366 batting line in 44 games for the Pirates. He was outrighted to the Triple-A Indianapolis Indians on June 12. Difo was re-selected to the active roster on July 2. Difo hit .269/.329/.384 with 4 home runs and 24 RBI in 116 games for the Pirates. On November 6, 2021, Difo was outrighted from the 40-man roster and elected free agency the next day.

=== Arizona Diamondbacks ===
On March 19, 2022, Difo signed a minor league contract with the Arizona Diamondbacks. In 74 appearances split between the rookie-level Arizona Complex League Diamondbacks and Triple-A Reno Aces, he batted .269/.315/.396 with seven home runs, 43 RBI, and four stolen bases. On September 1, the Diamondbacks selected Difo's contract, adding him to their active roster. He played in three games for Arizona, going hitless across six plate appearances. On September 12, Difo was designated for assignment by the Diamondbacks. He cleared waivers on September 19, but elected free agency in lieu of an outright assignment to Triple-A Reno.

=== New York Yankees ===
On December 23, 2022, Difo signed a minor league deal with the New York Yankees. He played in 96 games for the Triple–A Scranton/Wilkes-Barre RailRiders, hitting .208/.322/.303 with five home runs, 24 RBI, and 23 stolen bases. Difo elected free agency following the season on November 6, 2023.

=== Chicago White Sox ===
On April 13, 2024, Difo signed a minor league contract with the Chicago White Sox. In 94 appearances for the Triple-A Charlotte Knights, he slashed .276/.370/.405 with seven home runs, 44 RBI, and 11 stolen bases. Difo elected free agency following the season on November 4.

=== Guerreros de Oaxaca ===
On April 24, 2025, Difo signed with the Guerreros de Oaxaca of the Mexican League. In 59 appearances for Oaxaca, he batted .284/.381/.372 with two home runs, 23 RBI, and four stolen bases. Difo was released by the Guerreros on July 11.

=== Leones de Yucatán ===
On July 11, 2025, Difo was claimed off waivers by the Leones de Yucatán of the Mexican League. He played in 22 games for the Leones, hitting .273/.455/.288 with no home runs, six RBI, and three stolen bases. Difo was released by Yucatán on December 18.

=== Long Island Ducks ===
On April 7, 2026, Difo signed with the Long Island Ducks of the Atlantic League of Professional Baseball.

== Personal life ==
During the 2017 season, Difo attracted some media attention for his choice of walk-up music, as he frequently had romantic ballads like "Unchained Melody" and "My Girl" added to his rotation. Although some of Difo's teammates told The Washington Post they assumed someone was playing a joke on the young infielder, Difo explained to the paper, "I love those songs."

Difo chose to go by the nickname El Lindo, Spanish for "the beautiful one", for MLB Players' Weekend in 2017. The nickname was reportedly given to him by Nationals teammate Adam Lind.
