= Chris Heisey =

American baseball player (born 1984)

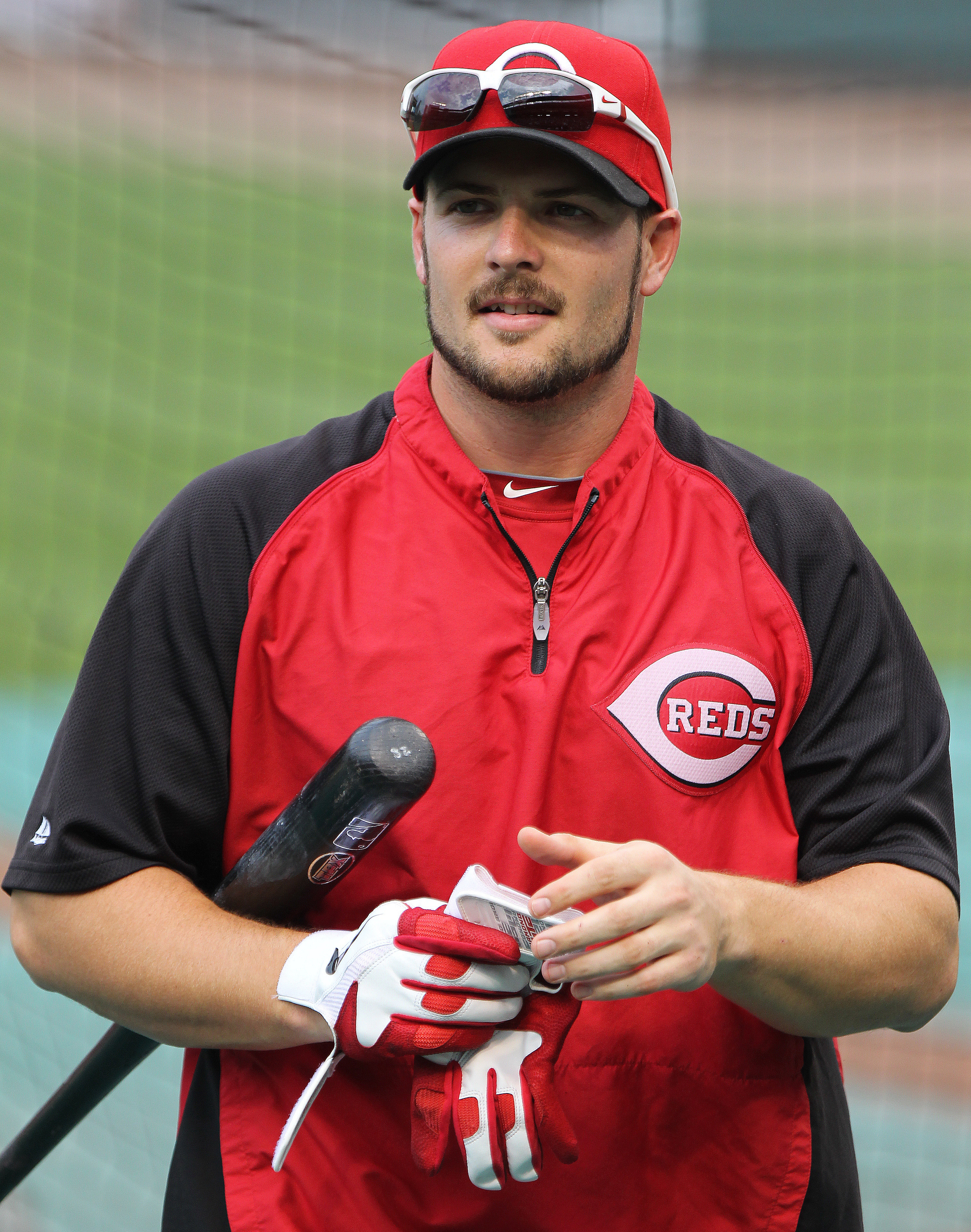
- Heisey with the Cincinnati Reds
- Outfielder
- Born: December 14, 1984 (age 41); Lancaster, Pennsylvania, U.S.
- Batted: Right Threw: Right

MLB debut
- May 3, 2010, for the Cincinnati Reds

Last MLB appearance
- July 22, 2017, for the Washington Nationals

MLB statistics
- Batting average: .238
- Home runs: 62
- Runs batted in: 178
- Stats at Baseball Reference

Teams
- Cincinnati Reds (2010–2014); Los Angeles Dodgers (2015); Washington Nationals (2016–2017)

Christopher J. Heisey (born December 14, 1984) is an American former professional baseball outfielder. He played in Major League Baseball (MLB) for the Cincinnati Reds, Los Angeles Dodgers, and Washington Nationals.

== Early life ==
Heisey graduated from Donegal High School in 2003, and went on to attend Messiah College in Grantham, Pennsylvania. At Messiah College, he set career records in batting average (.405), total bases (294), doubles (41), home runs (23), extra base hits (71), and consecutive game hitting streak (14).

== Professional career ==
=== Cincinnati Reds ===
Following his junior year of college, Heisey was drafted by the Cincinnati Reds in the 17th round of the 2006 Major League Baseball draft.

He played in the Reds' minor league system for all or parts of six seasons. In the minors leagues, he had a .294 overall batting average, 52 home runs, 241 RBI, and 88 stolen bases. In 2009, he was named the Reds' minor league player of the year.

Heisey was added to the Reds' 40-man roster after the 2009 season to protect him from the Rule 5 Draft.

Heisey played his first Major League game with the Cincinnati Reds on May 3, 2010, starting in right field and going 0-for-5 against the New York Mets. On May 11, starting in centerfield and batting leadoff for the Reds against the Pittsburgh Pirates, he got his first three Major League hits (the first came off starter Charlie Morton), including his first home run, a two-run shot off Jeff Karstens in a 9–0 win. Heisey played in 97 games his rookie season and batted .254 with eight home runs and 21 RBIs. He excelled as a pinch hitter, hitting four home runs to share the Major League lead in pinch-hit home runs with Matt Stairs.

On June 22, 2011, Heisey hit three home runs in a game against the New York Yankees. In 2011, he finished his second full Major League season with a .254 batting average, 18 home runs, and 50 RBI.

After qualifying as a Super Two player, giving him an extra year of arbitration eligibility, Heisey agreed to a one-year, $1.325 million contract on January 31, 2013.

=== Los Angeles Dodgers ===
On December 2, 2014, Heisey was acquired by the Los Angeles Dodgers in trade for pitcher Matt Magill. The Dodgers then signed him to a one-year, $2.16 million, contract to avoid salary arbitration. He was assigned to the AAA Oklahoma City Dodgers for the start of the 2015 season. The Dodgers called him up to play a game on April 22, 2015 and returned him to the minors after the game. He was called back up again on May 7. After being sent down he would be recalled to Los Angeles again from the Oklahoma City Dodgers on June 2. He was designated for assignment by the Dodgers on July 30, 2015. He was released by the team on August 7.

=== Toronto Blue Jays ===
On August 12, 2015, Heisey signed a minor league contract with the Toronto Blue Jays and was assigned to Triple-A Buffalo Bisons. He hit .155 in 17 games for Buffalo and was then traded back to the Dodgers for cash considerations on September 1. He rejoined the Dodgers roster on September 6. In 33 games for the Dodgers in 2015, he hit .182 with two homers and nine RBI. He was outrighted to the minors and chose to become a free agent on November 6, 2015.

=== Washington Nationals ===
In November 2015, Heisey signed a minor league contract with the Washington Nationals. He was reunited with Dusty Baker, for whom he played as a Red. Heisey hit .267 in spring training with 3 home runs and 11 RBI. On April 1, 2016, the Nationals announced he had made the team's 25-man roster, joining fellow non-roster invitee and former Cincinnati teammate Matt Belisle.

On April 24, 2016, Heisey hit his first career walk-off home run to give the Nats a win over the Minnesota Twins in 16 innings.

On October 13, 2016, in the deciding game of a 5-game NLDS series with the Los Angeles Dodgers, Heisey hit a pinch-hit two-run home run in the bottom of the seventh inning to pull the hometown Nationals within one run of the Dodgers at a score of 4–3.

In November 2016, Heisey signed a one-year, $1.4 million contract with the Washington Nationals. Heisey did not repeat the production from 2016, hitting just .162 with one home run. He was released by the Nationals on July 30, 2017.

=== Minnesota Twins ===
On February 13, 2018, Heisey signed a minor league contract with the Minnesota Twins. He was released on March 22, 2018.

== Personal life ==
Heisey is the oldest of four children born to Craig and Linda Heisey. His father died in 2007 of amyotrophic lateral sclerosis. He is married to Lisa Heisey. Heisey is a Christian. He is close friends with Stephen Drew, whom he met and developed a rapport with during the 2016 season, when both served as key reserves for the Nationals.
