= Wil Myers =

American baseball player (born 1990)

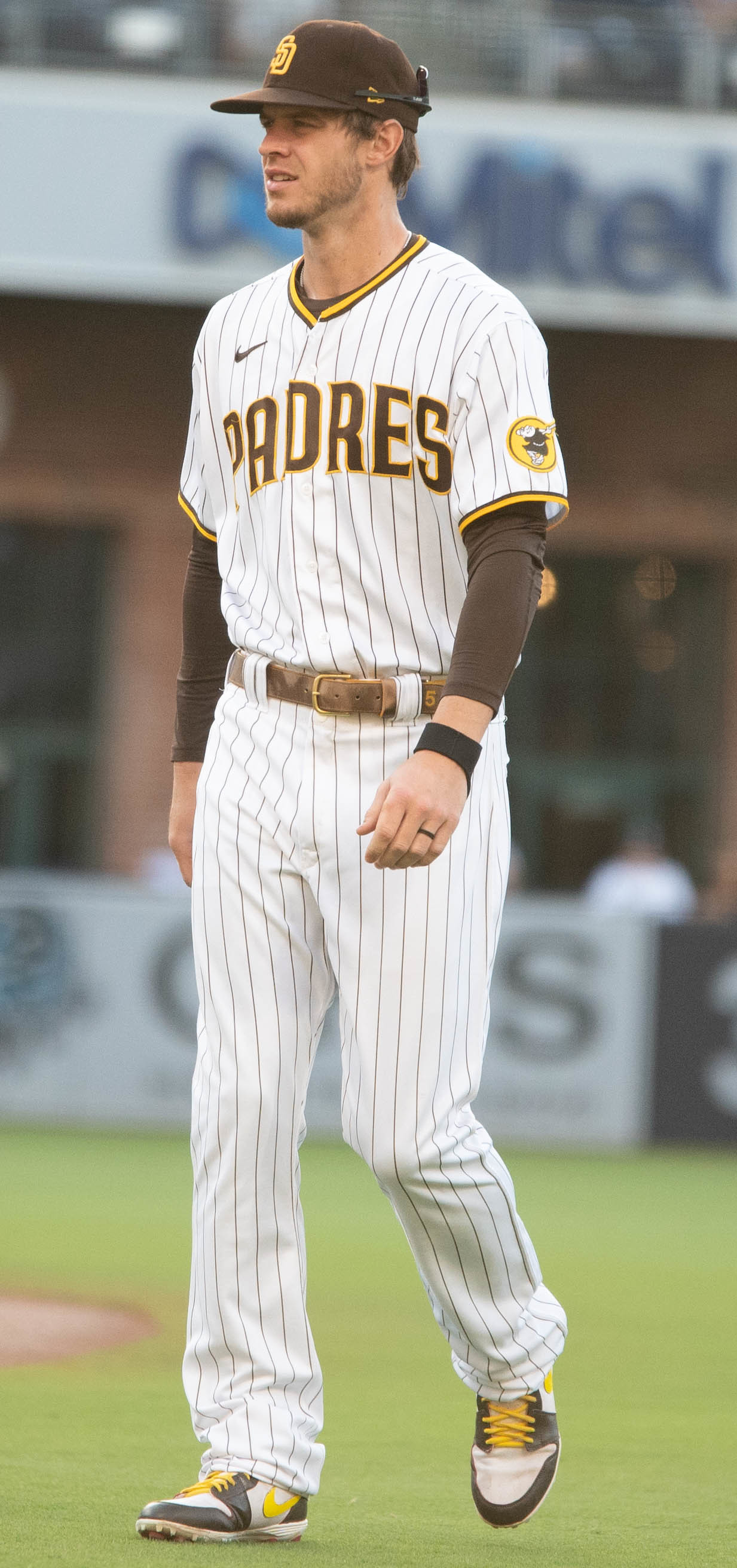
- Myers with the San Diego Padres in 2021
- Outfielder / First baseman
- Born: December 10, 1990 (age 35); Thomasville, North Carolina, U.S.
- Batted: Right Threw: Right

MLB debut
- June 18, 2013, for the Tampa Bay Rays

Last MLB appearance
- May 23, 2023, for the Cincinnati Reds

MLB statistics
- Batting average: .252
- Home runs: 156
- Runs batted in: 533
- Stats at Baseball Reference

Teams
- Tampa Bay Rays (2013–2014); San Diego Padres (2015–2022); Cincinnati Reds (2023)

Career highlights and awards
- All-Star (2016); AL Rookie of the Year (2013)

William Bradford Myers (born December 10, 1990) is an American former professional baseball outfielder and first baseman. He played in Major League Baseball (MLB) for the Tampa Bay Rays, San Diego Padres, and Cincinnati Reds.

Originally drafted by the Kansas City Royals, he was traded to the Rays in 2012. He won the AL Rookie of the Year Award in 2013.

== Early career ==
Myers attended and played baseball at Wesleyan Christian Academy in High Point, North Carolina. As a freshman, Myers had a .450 batting average and was an all-state third baseman. During his junior year, he went 10–0 as a pitcher. After committing to the University of South Carolina, Myers was drafted by the Kansas City Royals. In 2008, his team won a state championship.

== Professional career ==
=== Kansas City Royals ===
Myers was drafted by the Kansas City Royals as a catcher in the third round, with the 91st overall selection, of the 2009 Major League Baseball draft. Myers signed a contract with the Royals, that included a $2 million signing bonus, in August 2009. Before the draft, Myers had committed to South Carolina during his junior year.

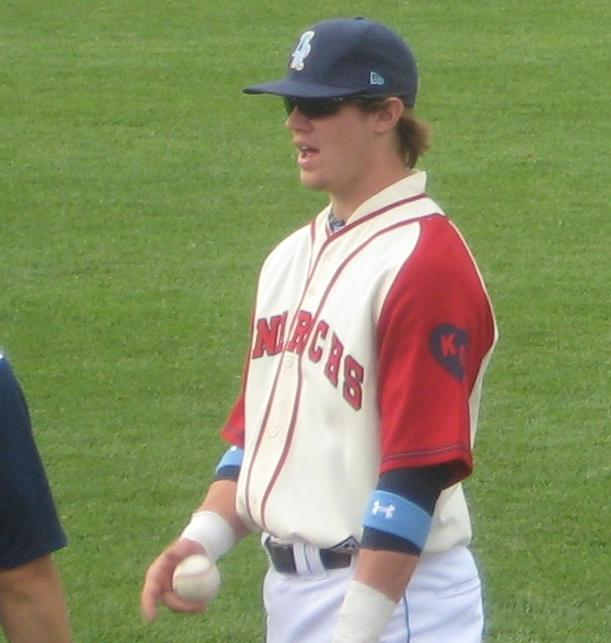
Myers in 2010 with the Wilmington Blue Rocks

Myers made his debut in professional baseball in 2009, when he played catcher and batted .369 with five home runs in 84 at bats with Royals' Rookie League affiliates, the Idaho Falls Chukars and the Burlington Royals. Myers began the 2010 season playing catcher for the Burlington Bees of the Midwest League and was named to the Midwest League All Star team. On July 1, 2010, the Royals promoted Myers to the Wilmington Blue Rocks of the Carolina League, a league generally considered more advanced than those in which he had previously played. Myers played catcher and finished the 2010 season batting .315 with a .429 on-base percentage overall, and totaled 14 home runs, 83 runs batted in, and 85 walks between his time in the Midwest League and Carolina League. In 2011, playing for the Double–A Northwest Arkansas Naturals, he batted .254 with eight home runs and 49 RBIs in 99 games. He played primarily outfield in 2012, and was named to appear in the 2012 All-Star Futures Game.

=== Tampa Bay Rays (2013–2014) ===
On December 9, 2012, Myers was traded to the Tampa Bay Rays (along with Jake Odorizzi, Patrick Leonard, and Mike Montgomery) in exchange for James Shields, Wade Davis, and a player to be named later (later chosen to be Elliot Johnson). He started the 2013 season with the Triple-A Durham Bulls of the International League. On June 17, Myers was called up to the Rays, for whom he played outfield.

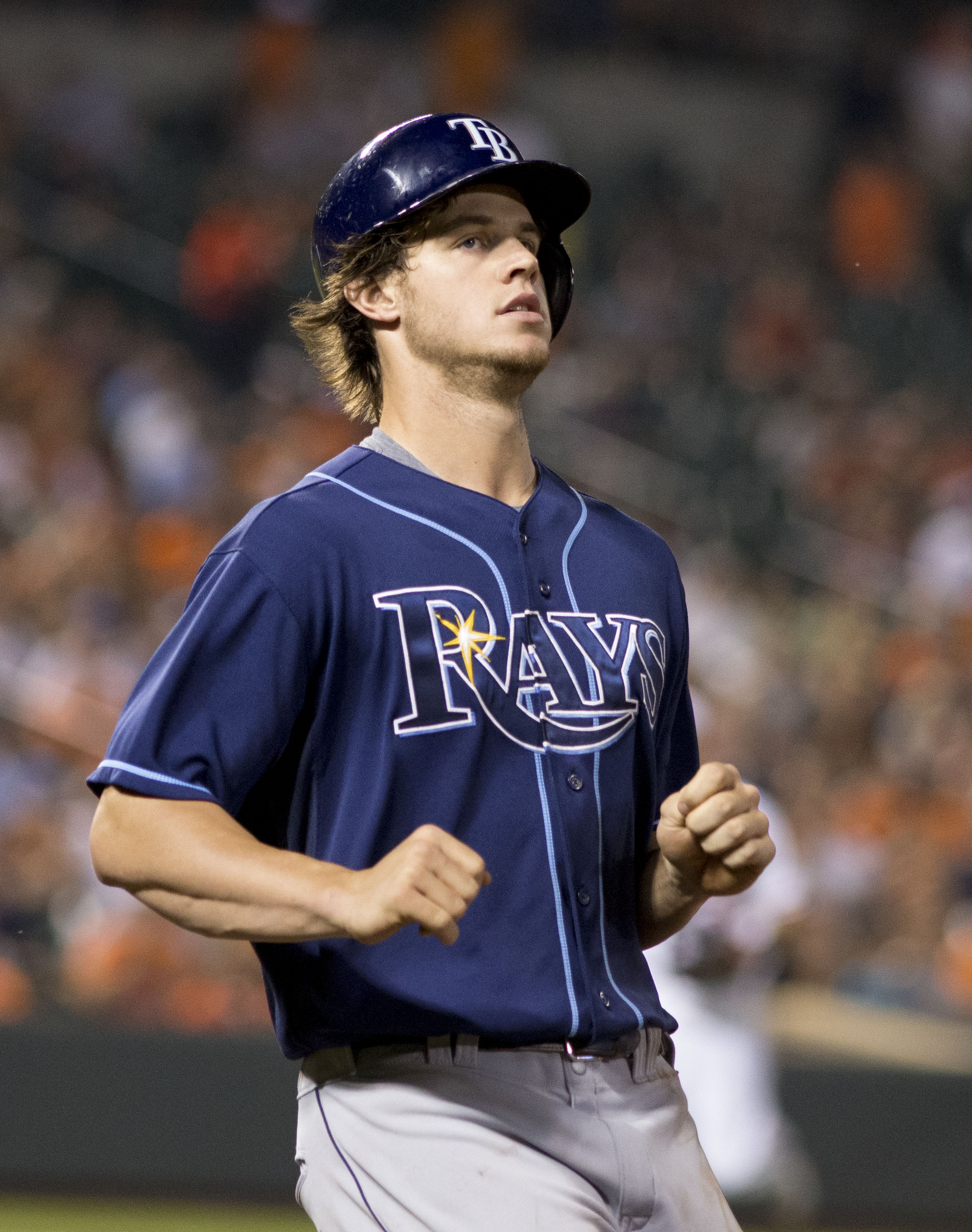
Myers with the Tampa Bay Rays in 2013

Myers won the AL Rookie of the Year award in 2013, beating teammate and pitcher Chris Archer and Detroit shortstop José Iglesias. In spite of the fact he had not joined the Rays until their 70th game on June 18, Myers led AL rookies with a 53 RBIs in the 88 games he did play in. The last player to lead AL rookies in RBIs in fewer than 90 games was Hoot Evers playing for the Detroit Tigers in 1946, when he had 33 in 81 games, and also became the first-ever hitter to win the award in under 100 games.

In the post-season, Myers had two singles in 20 at bats.

Myers entered 2014 as the Rays' everyday right fielder. On May 4, Myers hit his first career inside-the-park home run. During a game against the Boston Red Sox on May 30, Myers collided with Desmond Jennings while attempting to catch a fly ball, resulting in a stress fracture in Myers' right wrist, which required a cast and significant rehab time. Myers returned to the club on August 20, initially slotted as a DH before returning to the field.

In 2014, he batted .222/.294/.320 with six home runs and 35 RBIs in 325 at bats.

=== San Diego Padres (2015–2022) ===
On December 19, 2014, the Rays traded Myers, Ryan Hanigan, and Jose Castillo to the San Diego Padres as part of a three-team transaction, in which the Padres traded Jake Bauers, Burch Smith, and René Rivera to the Rays, the Padres traded Joe Ross and Trea Turner to the Washington Nationals, and Washington traded Steven Souza and Travis Ott to Tampa Bay.

==== 2015 ====
Myers was the Padres 2015 Opening Day center fielder and manned the position through April and into May. Myers went on the disabled list in early May with tendinitis in his left wrist, and missed a month. After returning for only three games in June, he went back on the disabled list as the wrist continued to bother him. Myers returned from the DL on September 4 after a surgical procedure to shave down a bone spur irritating the tendon. Following his return, Myers began playing first base in addition to the outfield, with Melvin Upton Jr. and Travis Jankowski getting most of the starts in center after the trade of Will Venable.

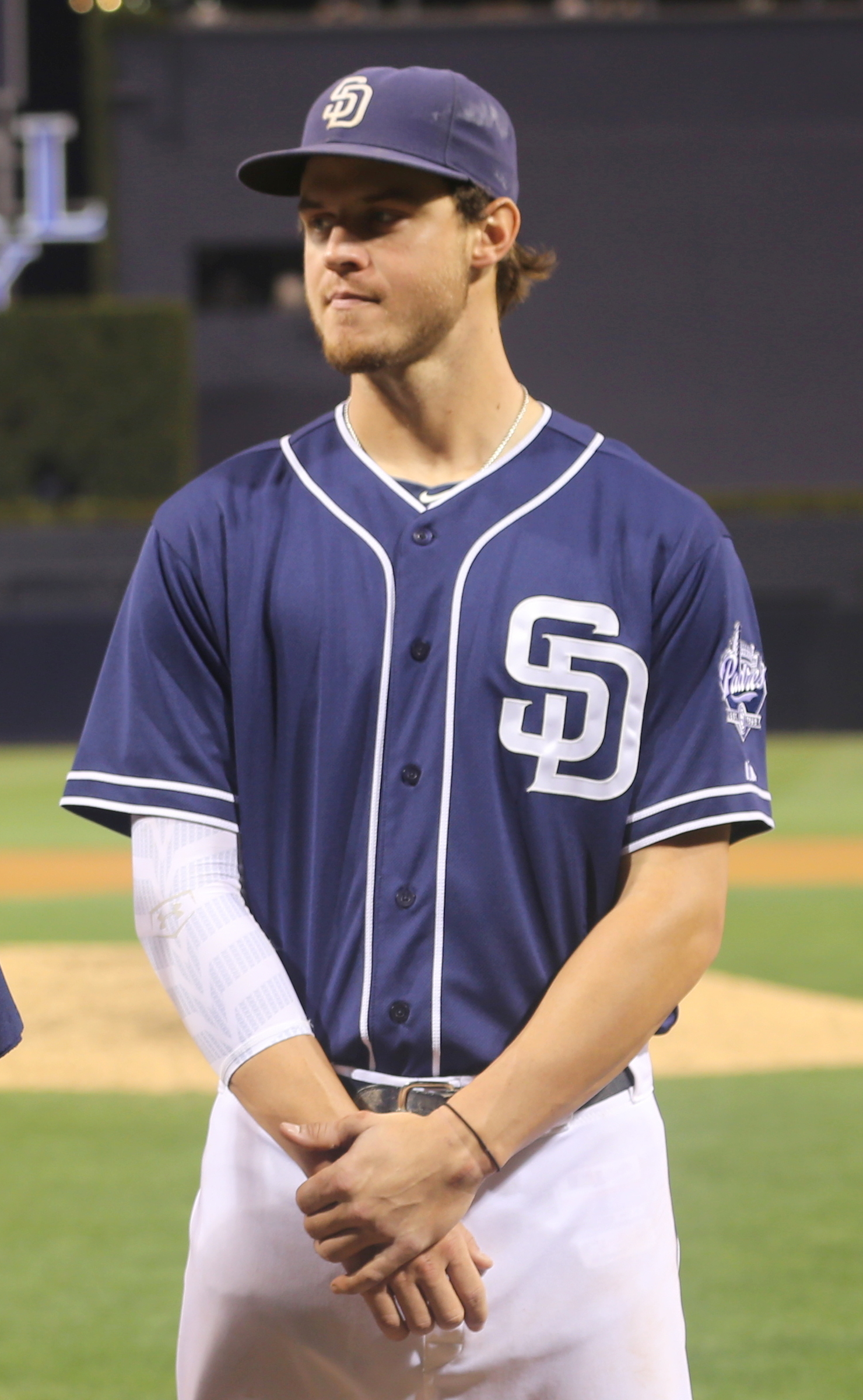
Myers with the Padres in 2015

In 2015, he batted .253/.336/.427 with eight home runs and 29 RBIs in 225 at bats.

==== 2017 ====
On January 17, 2017, Myers signed a six-year $83 million extension with the Padres.

Myers hit for the cycle on April 10, 2017, at Coors Field against the Colorado Rockies. It was the second cycle in Padres history. On September 2, a commemorative bobblehead celebrating his accomplishment was handed out to fans at Petco Park.

For the season, Myers continued to hit for power, hitting 30 home runs, and speed, stealing 20 bases. He tied for the National League lead in power-speed number (24.0). However, his consistency declined, as the season saw him striking out 180 times, the second-highest total in the National League, with his batting average declining to .243, and him hitting just .222 with runners in scoring position. On defense, he played almost exclusively first base.

==== 2018 ====
In early April, Myers suffered from nerve irritation in his right arm and was placed on the disabled list, and on April 28 he suffered a left oblique strain and was again placed on the disabled list. On July 7, Myers hit three homers in a 20–5 loss to the Arizona Diamondbacks. The 15-run loss was the first time in Major League history that a team had a player hit three home runs and go on to lose by double digits. On August 4, he was placed on the disabled list with a bruised left foot.

Myers was involved in a controversy in early September, when footage emerged during a live stream of teammate Carlos Asuaje playing the video game Fortnite involved Myers, chatting with Asuaje while playing, criticizing manager Andy Green. Myers apologized to Green and took responsibility for the remarks.

He ended the season batting .253 with 11 home runs and 39 RBIs in 83 games. He played 41 games in the outfield, 36 at third base, and two at first base. In his major league career through 2018, Myers played 329 games at first base, 248 games in the outfield, and 37 games at third base.

==== 2019 ====
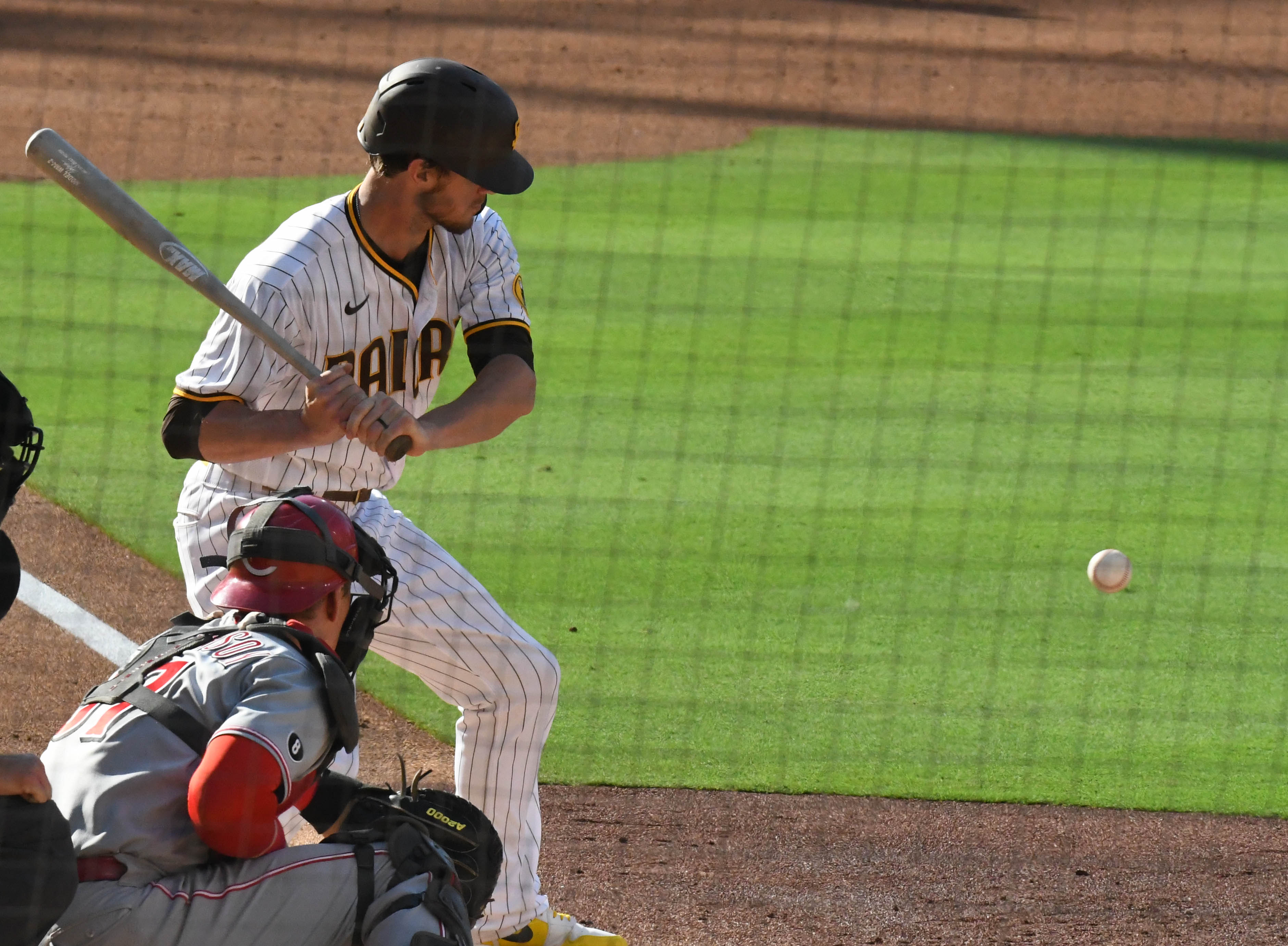
Myers bats for the Padres in 2021

Over the offseason before the 2019 season, the Padres signed star third baseman Manny Machado, which moved Wil Myers to the outfield. Due to the emergence of corner outfielders Franmil Reyes and Hunter Renfroe in 2018 while Myers was injured, he was also involved in trade rumors, but nothing materialized. On opening day, Myers hit the first home run of the Padres season. On April 15, Myers hit his 100th career home run in a home loss to the Rockies. However, Myers would have a disappointing season, striking out 168 times (over 30% of his plate appearances) while batting .239 with only 18 home runs.

Following the DFA of Robbie Erlin on October 31, Myers became the longest-tenured Padre.

==== 2020 ====
In the 2020 season shortened by COVID-19, Myers played in 55 of the 60 games and batted .288/.353/.606 with 15 home runs and 40 RBIs.

On August 18, Myers hit a grand slam in a 6–4 road win against the Texas Rangers, which extended San Diego's grand slam streak to 2 games. Two days later, the Padres would make history as the first team in MLB history to hit a grand slam in four consecutive games.

This year also marked the first winning season and first postseason appearance for Myers in San Diego, with the Padres making the playoffs for the first time since 2006 as the division second place team in the 16-team playoff format for 2020. In six postseason games, Myers slashed .227/.346/.545 with two home runs and five RBIs; Myers hit both of his home runs in Game 2 of the 2020 National League Wild Card Series, which was the first series that the Padres won since 1998 after they beat St. Louis in three games. They lost in the 2020 National League Division Series to the Los Angeles Dodgers in a three-game sweep.

==== 2021 ====
Following the addition of Blake Snell, Myers switched to number 5 for the first time in his career.

In 146 games, Myers regressed to a .256/.334/.434 batting line, adding 17 home runs and 68 RBIs.

==== 2022 ====
Due to injuries and the midseason acquisition of Juan Soto, Myers saw a drastic reduction in playing time, batting .261/.315/.398 with 7 home runs and 41 RBI in just 77 games. However, Myers left his mark off the field when he paid for $1,000 worth of drinks in downtown San Diego following Game 4 of the NLDS, in which the Padres stunned and eliminated the rival Los Angeles Dodgers. On November 7, 2022, the Padres declined their $20 million club option on Myers for the 2023 season and he became a free agent.

=== Cincinnati Reds ===
Myers signed a one-year contract worth $7.5 million, $1.5 million in achievable incentives, and a mutual option for the 2024 season with the Cincinnati Reds on December 22, 2022. In 37 games for the Reds in 2023, Myers hit just .189/.257/.283 with 3 home runs and 12 RBI. After a stint on the injured list in which he dealt with kidney stones and a left shoulder sprain, Myers was designated for assignment upon being activated on June 20, 2023. He was released by the Reds on June 23.

On December 22, 2024, Myers announced that he had retired from professional baseball after not playing in the 2024 season.

== Coaching career ==
On January 14, 2026, the San Diego Padres announced that Myers had been hired as a special assignment coach for player development.

== Personal life ==
Myers' parents are Eric and Pamela Myers. He has a younger brother named Beau who pitched to him in the 2016 Home Run Derby. He married Maggie Reaves on November 3, 2018. During his tenure with the Padres, broadcaster Mark Grant nicknamed him "El Gallo" ("The Rooster" in Spanish), due to his hairstyle.

In November 2021, Myers and Carmel Country Club in Charlotte sued each other. Carmel claims Myers owes the club $64,000 in initiation fees, and Myers is calling for more than $150,000 in damages, claiming that the club hides how difficult it is to get tee times.

== See also ==
- List of Major League Baseball players to hit for the cycle

Achievements
Preceded by John Jaso	Hitting for the cycle April 10, 2017	Succeeded by Trea Turner
