= Steven Souza Jr. =

American baseball player (born 1989)

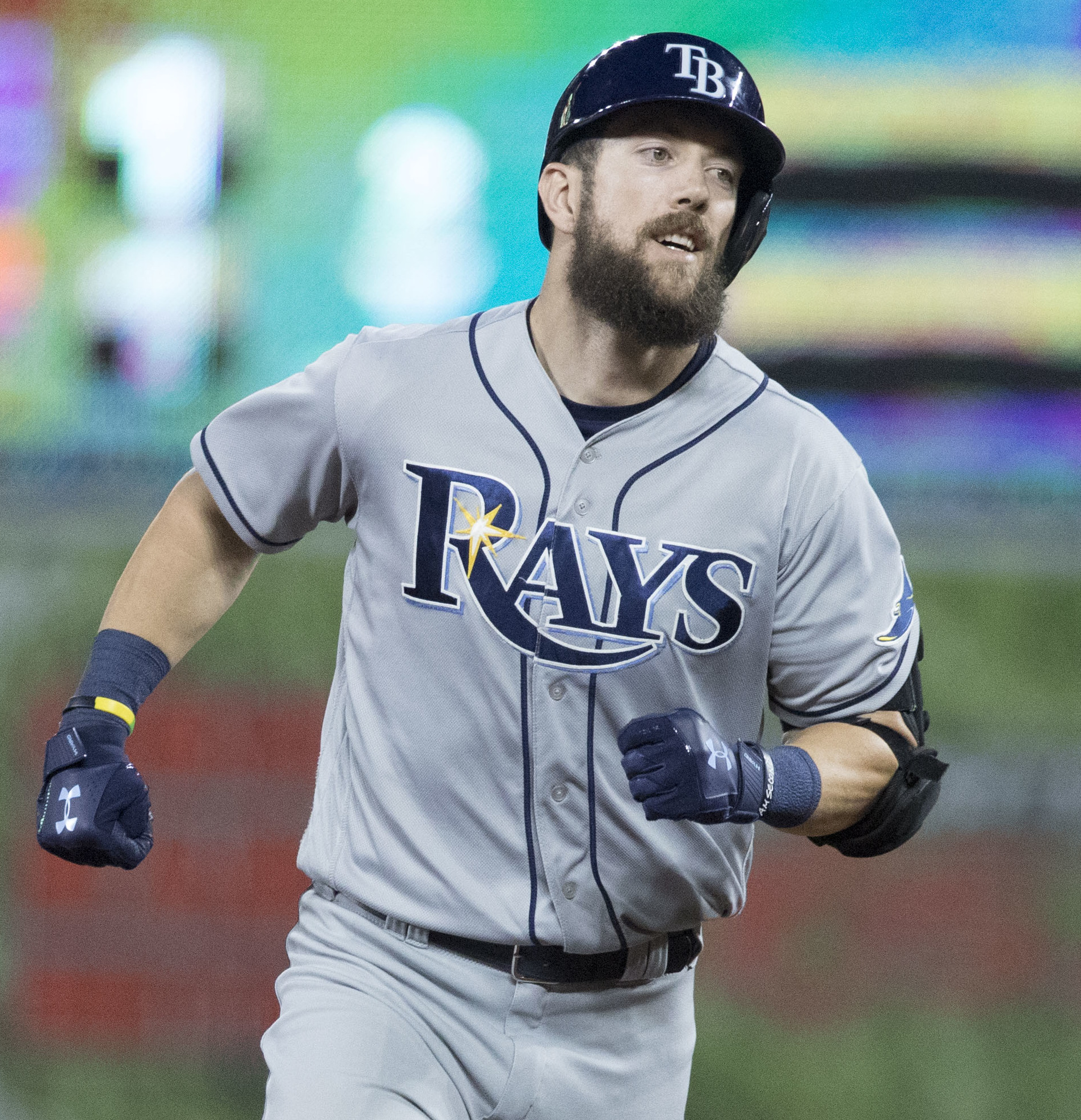
- Souza with the Tampa Bay Rays in 2017

San Diego Padres – No. 28
- Right fielder / Coach
- Born: April 24, 1989 (age 37); Everett, Washington, U.S.
- Batted: Right Threw: Right

MLB debut
- April 13, 2014, for the Washington Nationals

Last MLB appearance
- May 19, 2022, for the Seattle Mariners

MLB statistics
- Batting average: .229
- Home runs: 72
- Runs batted in: 207
- Stats at Baseball Reference

Teams
- As player: Washington Nationals (2014); Tampa Bay Rays (2015–2017); Arizona Diamondbacks (2018); Chicago Cubs (2020); Los Angeles Dodgers (2021); Seattle Mariners (2022); As coach: San Diego Padres (2026–present)

Steven Jeffrey Souza Jr. (born April 24, 1989) is an American former professional baseball right fielder who currently serves as the hitting coach for the San Diego Padres of Major League Baseball (MLB). He played in MLB for the Washington Nationals, Tampa Bay Rays, Arizona Diamondbacks, Chicago Cubs, Los Angeles Dodgers, and Seattle Mariners.

== Amateur career ==
Souza attended Cascade High School in Everett, Washington. In high school, Souza starred for the school's baseball and football teams. Souza committed to attend Washington State University on a baseball scholarship, while also playing football for the Washington State Cougars.

== Professional career ==
=== Washington Nationals ===
The Washington Nationals selected Souza in the third round (100th overall) of the 2007 Major League Baseball draft. Souza signed with the Nationals rather than attend college, receiving a $346,000 signing bonus. He played for the Hagerstown Suns of the Single-A South Atlantic League in 2009 and 2010. In 2009, he had 116 strikeouts in 126 games. He was selected for the South Atlantic League All-Star Game in 2010, but he also received a 50-game suspension for use of a banned substance.

Souza played for the Potomac Nationals of the High-A Carolina League in 2011. Late in the season, he was benched for breaking team rules, and considered leaving the Nationals' organization to play college football. He returned to the Nationals' organization in 2012, and batted .297 with 23 home runs between Hagerstown and Potomac. In 2013, Souza played for the Harrisburg Senators of the Double-A Eastern League, where he batted .300 with 15 home runs and 20 stolen bases in 77 games. He played in the Arizona Fall League after the regular season. He was added to the Washington 40-man roster on November 1, 2013, in order to be protected from the Rule 5 draft.

Souza split his time between the Triple-A Syracuse Chiefs and the Washington Nationals in 2014. He was called up to the major leagues for the first time on April 12, 2014. Souza made his major league debut on April 13 in a game against the Atlanta Braves. He entered as a defensive replacement in the seventh inning and struck out in his only at-bat of the game, which ended in a 10–2 loss for the Nationals. He was sent down to Syracuse on May 5 in order to make room for Scott Hairston, who had just come off the disabled list. On July 16, Souza went 2–for–4 in the Triple-A All-Star Game with a double and a single. Souza's performance at the Triple-A level was recognized with his selection as the International League Most Valuable Player and Rookie of the Year. He led the International League in batting average with .354, on base percentage with .435 and slugging percentage with .601.

On August 4, Souza was called up to the Washington Nationals after Nate McLouth was put on the 15-day disabled list. On August 8, he was injured in a game against the Atlanta Braves after trying to rob Freddie Freeman of a home run. He was placed on the 15-day disabled list on August 10 with a left shoulder contusion. On September 28, 2014, in the final game of the regular season, Souza made a dramatic leaping catch of a fly ball to left-center field for the final out to secure Jordan Zimmermann's no-hitter, the first for the Nationals since moving to Washington, DC in 2005.

=== Tampa Bay Rays ===
On December 19, 2014, the Nationals traded Souza and Travis Ott to the Tampa Bay Rays in a three-team trade, in which the San Diego Padres traded Joe Ross and a player to be named later (Trea Turner) to the Nationals, the Padres traded Jake Bauers, Burch Smith, and René Rivera to the Rays, and the Padres received Wil Myers, Ryan Hanigan, and Jose Castillo from the Rays.

In 2015, Souza started the season as an opening day starter, with his first home run as a Ray hitting the hotel in Rogers Centre. In August 2015, Souza was placed on the disabled list with a broken hand. Overall, Souza played in 110 games, batting .225/.318/.399 with 16 home runs, 40 RBI, and 12 steals, playing mainly in right field.

In 2016, Souza once again saw daily playing time, playing in 120 games with the club. Overall, Souza saw improvements in nearly every statistic, batting .247/.303/.409 with 17 home runs and 49 RBI.

In 2017, Souza started the season by batting .330/.411/.543 in the month of April winning American League Player of the Week for the week of April 23 On May 26, Souza comically made national media after he dove for a ball in Target Field that was almost 30 feet away from him, his next at bat he received a standing ovation from Twins fans, then promptly launched a home run up into the second deck. On July 15, Souza set a new career high after hitting his 18th home run of the year into the camera well in Angels Stadium. On July 26, Souza hit a 455-foot home run against the Baltimore Orioles that hit the d-ring catwalk in Tropicana Field. Souza had a breakout year in 2017, improving on nearly every statistic, setting career highs for home runs (30), RBI (78), runs (78), stolen bases (16), OBP (.351), and SLG (.459), as well as doubling his walk rate and cutting his strikeout percentage to a career low. Because of his performance, he was named the Rays' MVP for the 2017 season.

=== Arizona Diamondbacks ===
On February 20, 2018, the Rays sent Souza to the Arizona Diamondbacks in a three-team trade, in which the New York Yankees acquired Brandon Drury, the Diamondbacks acquired Taylor Widener from the Yankees, and the Rays acquired Nick Solak from the Yankees and Anthony Banda and two players to be named later (Colin Poche and Sam McWilliams) from the Diamondbacks.

In an effort to find innovative ways to improve after his first career 30-homer season, he started to use strobe glasses. Every day, he would don the eyewear and head to the outfield for extra batting practice against tiny foam balls. The specs would shut off his field of vision at specific intervals and help him sharpen his pitch recognition.

Souza was ejected for the first time in his MLB career on May 12, 2018, by home plate umpire Doug Eddings, after throwing his bat in reaction to a called third strike. On May 22, Souza landed on the disabled list for the second time with the same injury, a strained right pectoral muscle, which caused him to miss the first month and a half of the season.

On March 25, 2019, Souza tore his left anterior cruciate ligament, lateral collateral ligament, posterior lateral capsule, and partially tore his left posterior cruciate ligament, prematurely ending his 2019 season during spring training. On December 2, Arizona opted not to tender Souza a contract for the 2020 season, and he became a free agent.

=== Chicago Cubs ===
On January 28, 2020, the Chicago Cubs officially announced that they signed Souza to a one-year contract. Souza was designated for assignment by the Cubs on September 5 after hitting .148/.258/.333 with one home run and five RBI in 11 games. Souza was released by the organization on September 8.

=== Houston Astros ===
On January 30, 2021, Souza signed a minor league contract with the Houston Astros organization and was invited to Spring Training. On March 24, Souza was released by the Astros after going 2-for-21 with a home run and five walks across 27 spring training plate appearances.

=== Los Angeles Dodgers ===
On March 31, 2021, Souza signed a minor league contract with the Los Angeles Dodgers organization. He hit .279 in 22 games with six home runs and 16 RBI for the Triple-A Oklahoma City Dodgers before he was called up to the major leagues on June 16. In 13 games, Souza had four hits in 25 at-bats with one home run before being designated for assignment on July 6. He was released by the Dodgers on July 11, but was re-signed to a new minor league contract on July 17. Souza was called back up to the majors on September 7 and again designated for assignment on September 13. On the season in Triple-A, he hit .274 in 56 games. Souza was added back to the Dodgers' roster for the postseason, and appeared in six games through three different series, primarily as a pinch hitter. He had one hit in eight at-bats, while striking out four times.

=== Seattle Mariners ===
Souza signed a minor league contract with the Seattle Mariners on March 13, 2022. On May 13, Souza was selected to the active roster and placed in the starting lineup, replacing Jarred Kelenic, who had been sent down. He was designated for assignment on May 22, and released the next day.

Souza officially retired from baseball on July 19, 2022.

== Coaching career ==
On November 24, 2025, the San Diego Padres hired Souza to serve as the team's hitting coach under new manager Craig Stammen.

== Personal life ==
Souza is a Christian. Early in his baseball career, Souza lived a lifestyle characterized by "drinking, staying out late, chasing women." After his live-in girlfriend cheated on him with a teammate, and he had a confrontation with Potomac Nationals manager Matt LeCroy, Souza briefly quit baseball in 2011. Brent Lillibridge, a friend and former major league player, invited him to attend his Christian church outside Seattle. Souza accepted, and after a period of time said he "could feel the Lord moving" and was baptized at age 22. He returned to baseball and worked to turn his life around.

Souza added the "Jr." to his name in 2012, to honor his father for supporting his baseball career. Steven Souza Sr. did not play baseball professionally.

Souza married Mikaela Peckman in 2015 and the couple welcomed their first child, a son, in December 2016.
