= Travis Ott =

American baseball pitcher

- Pitcher
- Born: June 29, 1995 (age 31); Shippensburg, Pennsylvania, U.S.
- Bats: Left Throws: Left
- Stats at Baseball Reference

Travis Ott (born June 29, 1995) is an American former professional baseball pitcher.

== Career ==
Ott attended Shippensburg Area High School in Shippensburg, Pennsylvania, and played for the school's baseball team. As a senior, he set a school record with 112 strikeouts. The Washington Nationals selected Ott in the 25th round of the 2013 MLB draft.

=== Washington Nationals ===
Ott pitched for the Gulf Coast Nationals of the Rookie-level Gulf Coast League after he signed. He had a 3–0 win–loss record and a 4.03 earned run average (ERA) in 29 innings pitched. He began the 2014 season with the Auburn Doubledays of the Low–A New York–Penn League. After pitching to a 3.05 ERA with Auburn, the Nationals promoted him to the Hagerstown Suns of the Single–A South Atlantic League.

=== Tampa Bay Rays ===
On December 19, 2014, the Nationals traded Ott and Steven Souza to the Tampa Bay Rays in a three-team trade, in which the San Diego Padres traded Joe Ross and a player to be named later (Trea Turner) to the Nationals, and the Padres traded Jake Bauers, Burch Smith, and René Rivera to the Rays, and the Padres got Wil Myers, Ryan Hanigan, and Jose Castillo from the Rays. Ott played for the Hudson Valley Renegades of the New York–Penn League in 2015, where the Rays worked with Ott to adapt a sidearm delivery. He remained with Hudson Valley in 2016, where he had a 6–0 record and a 1.21 ERA in 13 appearances. Ott spent 2017 with both the Bowling Green Hot Rods of the Single–A Midwest League and the Charlotte Stone Crabs of the High–A Florida State League, posting a combined 10–3 record with a 2.06 ERA in 27 games with 21 being starts. Ott began the 2018 season with the Montgomery Biscuits of the Double–A Southern League. In 44 appearances, Ott registered a 3.53 ERA with 91 strikeouts in 71.1 innings pitched. On April 3, 2019, Ott was placed on the restricted list and has not played in a professional game since.
