= René Rivera =

Puerto Rican baseball player (born 1983)

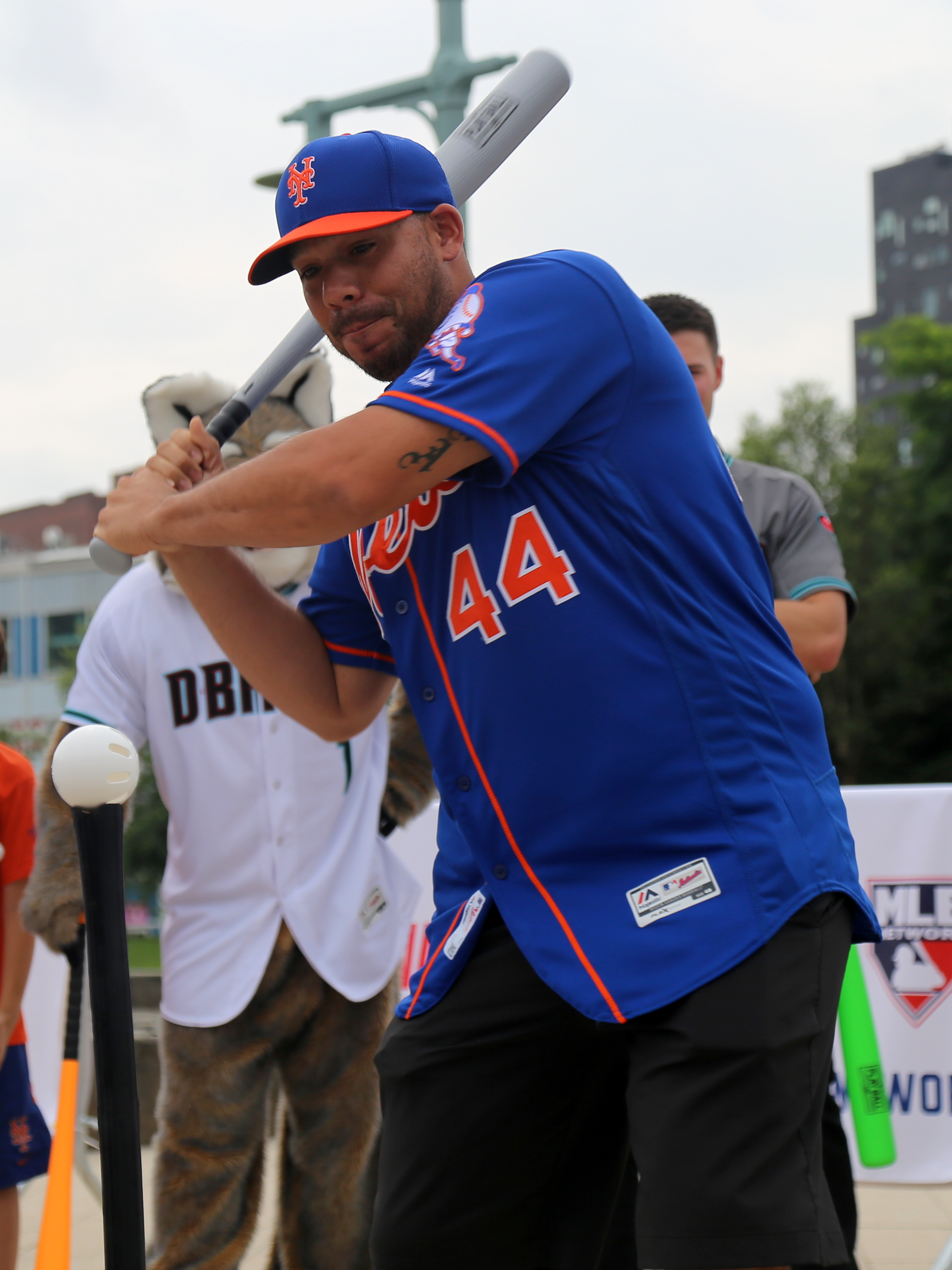
- Rivera during the Play Ball Derby event in 2016
- Catcher
- Born: July 31, 1983 (age 43); Bayamón, Puerto Rico
- Batted: Right Threw: Right

MLB debut
- September 22, 2004, for the Seattle Mariners

Last MLB appearance
- August 1, 2021, for the Washington Nationals

MLB statistics
- Batting average: .221
- Home runs: 43
- Runs batted in: 176
- Stats at Baseball Reference

Teams
- Seattle Mariners (2004–2006); Minnesota Twins (2011); San Diego Padres (2013–2014); Tampa Bay Rays (2015); New York Mets (2016–2017); Chicago Cubs (2017); Los Angeles Angels (2018); Atlanta Braves (2018); New York Mets (2019–2020); Cleveland Indians (2021); Washington Nationals (2021)
Medals
Men's baseball
Representing Puerto Rico
World Baseball Classic
Silver medal – second place	2017 Los Angeles	Team

René Rivera (born July 31, 1983) is a Puerto Rican former professional baseball catcher. He played in Major League Baseball (MLB) for the Seattle Mariners, Minnesota Twins, San Diego Padres, Tampa Bay Rays, New York Mets, Chicago Cubs, Los Angeles Angels, Atlanta Braves, Cleveland Indians, and Washington Nationals.

== Professional career ==
=== Seattle Mariners ===
Rivera was drafted by the Seattle Mariners in the second round (49th overall) of the 2001 Major League Baseball draft as a 17-year-old. He was chosen as a compensation pick from the Texas Rangers for the signing of Alex Rodriguez. Rivera played most of the 2004 season with the High-A California League Inland Empire 66ers but played with both the Triple-A and Major League clubs in September. He made his Major League debut September 22, 2004, playing in two games for the Mariners that season as a late-inning replacement. Rivera began 2005 with the Double-A San Antonio Missions. He was promoted to the Mariners on May 15, but optioned back to San Antonio on May 20 without appearing in a game. He was again promoted to the Mariners on May 30 when starting catcher Miguel Olivo was sent down to Triple-A. On May 31, Rivera had his first Major League start and base hit, going 3 for 5 at the plate. Rivera shared catching duties with Pat Borders in June and was optioned back to San Antonio when Olivo returned. He played with the Triple-A Tacoma Rainiers in August and returned to the Mariners in September. In 2005, he had 12 starts at catcher and 19 hits in 48 at-bats at the Major League level.

Rivera was one of the final players cut from the roster in 2006 spring training and began the year at Triple-A. He was back with the Mariners by mid-April and served as a back-up to Kenji Johjima for the remainder of the season, batting .152 in 99 at-bats over 35 games. During the off-season, the Mariners weighed the benefits of allowing the young catcher to develop his hitting in the minor leagues against his providing limited offense in a back-up role in the Majors. In 2007, Rivera played for the Mariners Double-A affiliate, the West Tenn Diamond Jaxx, batting .214 in 91 games. He was granted free agency in November.

=== Los Angeles Dodgers ===
On November 22, 2007, Rivera signed a minor league contract that included an invitation to spring training with the Los Angeles Dodgers. The Dodgers assigned him to Double-A Jacksonville to begin the 2008 season. While at Jacksonville, Rivera began playing some first base, along with catcher, and was promoted to Triple-A Las Vegas on June 3. He hit .250 across both levels and was granted free agency at the end of the season.

=== New York Mets ===
Rivera signed with the New York Mets in November 2008. He spent the 2009 season with the Triple-A Buffalo Bisons, appearing in 63 games at catcher and 3 at third base. He hit .234 with 9 home runs.

=== Camden Riversharks ===
Rivera began the 2010 season with the independent Camden Riversharks of the Atlantic League of Professional Baseball. In 22 games with Camden, Rivera batted .280/.337/.610 with 7 home runs and 19 RBI.

=== New York Yankees ===
The New York Yankees signed Rivera on May 20, 2010, to a minor league contract. He was initially assigned to the Triple-A Scranton/Wilkes-Barre Yankees and was later moved to the Double-A Trenton Thunder.

=== Minnesota Twins ===
On December 17, 2010, Rivera signed a minor league contract with the Minnesota Twins. His contract was purchased by the Twins on May 5, 2011. He was brought up from Triple-A to provide back-up to Drew Butera, who was the Twins' primary catcher with Joe Mauer on the disabled list. He went back to Triple-A in early July, but rejoined the team on August 28 when Mauer was sitting out. He finished the year with the Twins, hitting .144 in 104 at-bats over 45 games on the season.

Rivera was granted free agency at the end of the 2011 season, but re-signed with the Twins on a minor league deal and an invitation to spring training. Rivera stayed with the Triple-A Rochester Red Wings for the full 2012 season, batting .226 in 95 games. Rivera was displeased with the Twins when he was passed over and they called up catcher Chris Herrmann from Double-A to add depth in September.

=== San Diego Padres ===
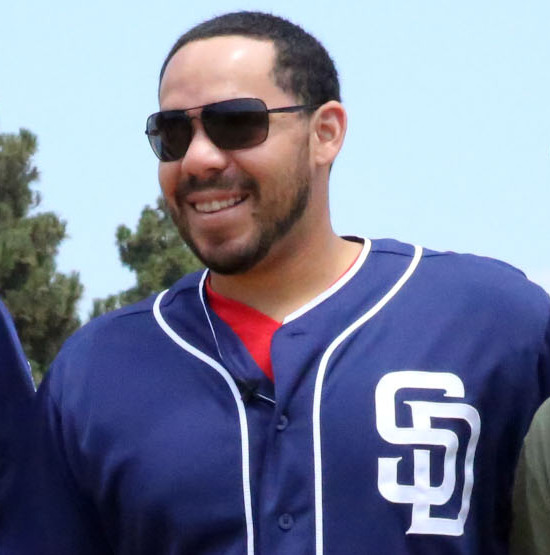
Rivera with the Padres in 2013

Rivera was signed to a minor league contract by the San Diego Padres on December 12, 2012. He was recalled from the Triple-A Tucson Padres on July 7, 2013, to replace Yasmani Grandal, who was placed on the disabled list. He was hitting .343 with Tucson at the time of his recall. He remained the backup to Nick Hundley for the rest of the season. In 23 games for San Diego, he hit .254/.268/.328 with 7 RBI and 4 runs.

The Padres opened 2014 carrying three catchers, and Rivera was selected as the Opening Day catcher. Rivera became the personal catcher for Andrew Cashner during the season and picked up more starts once Nick Hundley was traded in late May. He finished the year with the majority of starts at catcher for the Padres with 85. On August 27, Rivera hit a game-winning single in the 10th inning after hitting a game-tying home run in the 9th inning, becoming the first Padres player since Adrián González in 2010 to have tying and winning RBIs in the same game. On the year, Rivera batted .252 with 11 home runs in 294 at-bats over a total of 103 games.

=== Tampa Bay Rays ===
On December 19, 2014, the Padres traded Rivera, Jake Bauers, and Burch Smith to the Tampa Bay Rays in a three-team trade that saw the Rays trade Wil Myers, Jose Castillo and Ryan Hanigan to the Padres, the Padres trade Joe Ross and a player to be named later to the Washington Nationals, and Washington trade Steven Souza and Travis Ott to Tampa Bay. In 2015, he was mainly used as the personal catcher for Chris Archer. Rivera finished the 2015 season hitting .178 with 5 home runs and 26 RBIs. Rivera was released by the Rays on March 30, 2016.

=== New York Mets (second stint) ===
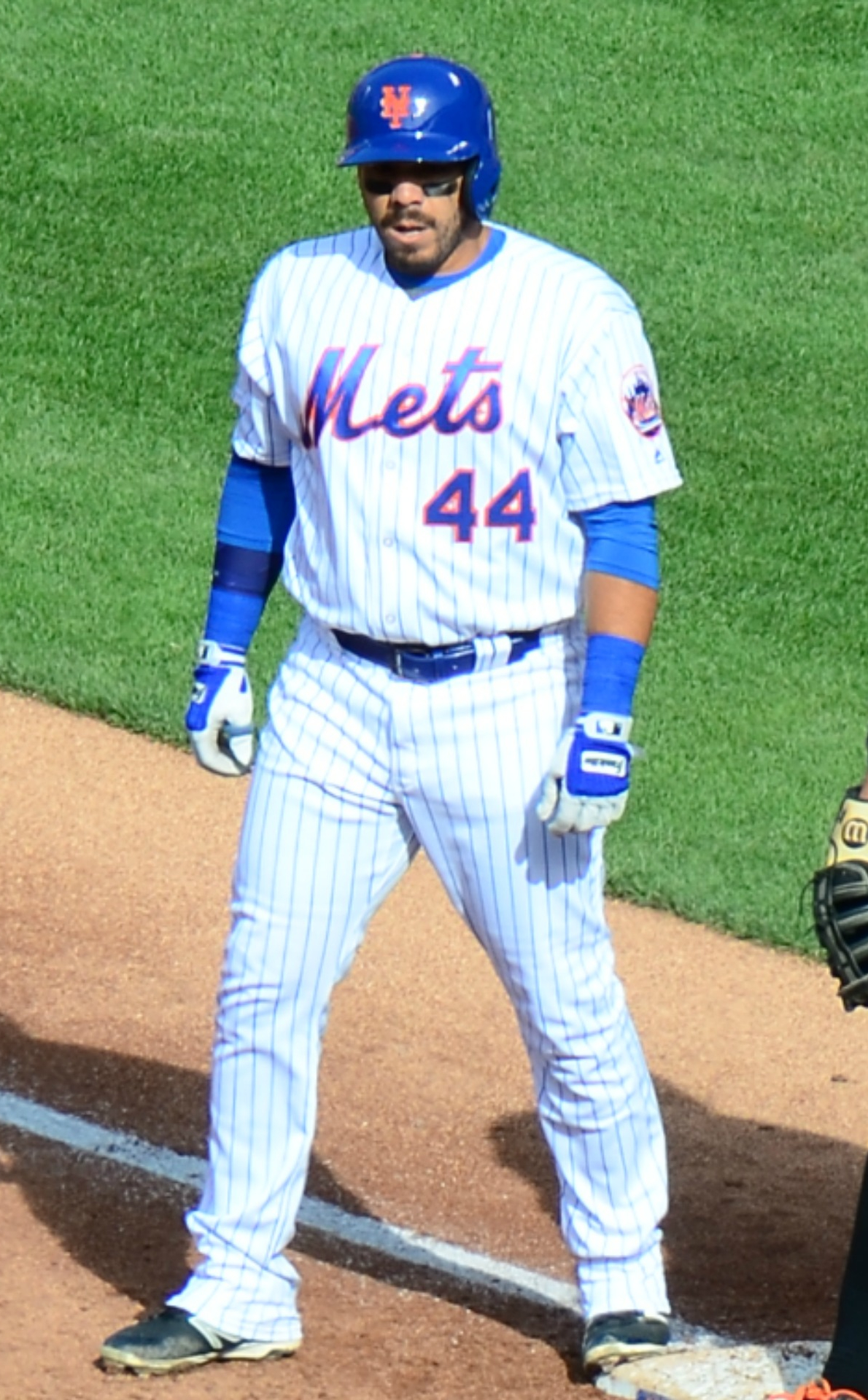
Rivera's second stint with the New York Mets in 2016

On April 5, 2016, Rivera signed a minor league deal with the New York Mets. He was called up to the major league team on April 26, 2016, when Travis d'Arnaud was placed on the disabled list. He started for the Mets in their Wild Card game against the San Francisco Giants, going 1 for 3 and throwing out Denard Span. Throughout the season he was Noah Syndergaard and Seth Lugo's personal catcher. Rivera appeared in 65 games for New York, posting a .222/.291/.341 slash line with 6 home runs and 26 RBI. On December 3, 2016, Rivera and the Mets avoided salary arbitration by agreeing to a one-year, $1.75 million contract.

=== Chicago Cubs ===
On August 19, 2017, the Chicago Cubs claimed Rivera off waivers. He was added to the 25-man roster and was the starting catcher for the Cubs the following day against the Toronto Blue Jays. In 20 games with Chicago, Rivera slashed .341/.408/.591 with 2 home runs and 12 RBI.

=== Los Angeles Angels ===
On January 9, 2018, Rivera signed with the Los Angeles Angels. In 30 games with the Angels, Rivera logged a .244/.287/.439 slash line with 4 home runs and 11 RBI.

=== Atlanta Braves ===
Rivera was claimed off waivers by the Atlanta Braves on August 29, 2018. Rivera appeared in 3 games for Atlanta, and went 0-for-4 with 3 strikeouts.

=== New York Mets (third stint) ===
On February 8, 2019, he signed a minor league deal with the San Francisco Giants. Rivera was released on March 23, 2019.

On March 25, 2019, Rivera signed a minor league deal with the New York Mets. He was assigned to the Triple-A Syracuse Mets. On August 24, the Mets selected Rivera's contract. In 9 games with the Mets, Rivera went 4-for-17 with 1 home run and 3 RBI. On January 21, 2020, Rivera re-signed with the Mets on a minor league deal. On July 19, 2020, Rivera was selected to the Mets' 40-man roster. Rivera only appeared in 2 games for the Mets before undergoing season ending surgery to remove a bone spur from his left elbow.

=== Cleveland Indians ===
On April 14, 2021, Rivera signed a minor league contract with the Cleveland Indians organization. The Indians selected Rivera's contract on May 5. Rivera slashed .236/.300/.400 with 2 home runs and 9 RBI in 21 games before he was designated for assignment on July 3. He was released by the Indians on July 8.

=== Washington Nationals ===
On July 16, 2021, Rivera signed a major league contract with the Washington Nationals. He made his Nationals debut at starting catcher the same evening in a game against the San Diego Padres. In 4 games for the Nationals, Rivera hit .214 with 0 home runs and 0 RBI's. On August 14, Rivera was released by the Nationals.

On February 17, 2023, Rivera announced his retirement from professional baseball.

== Coaching career ==
On February 21, 2023, Rivera was named manager of the Frederick Keys in the MLB Draft League.

In January 2024, Rivera was hired as bench coach for the Lakeland Flying Tigers, the Single-A affiliate of the Detroit Tigers. He was promoted to serve as the manager of Lakeland prior to the 2025 season. Following the season, Rivera was named as the Florida State League Manager of the Year, having led Lakeland to a league championship over the Daytona Tortugas.

On February 2, 2026, Rivera was announced as the manager for the West Michigan Whitecaps, Detroit's High-A affiliate.

== Accomplishments ==
- 2004 California League Mid-Season All-Star team
- 2002 Northwest League Post-season All-Star team
- MVP of the 2001 Excellence Tournament held in Puerto Rico

== Personal life ==
Rivera is married to Mariel Perez, daughter of Eddie 'La Bala' Pérez, a founding member of El Gran Combo de Puerto Rico. She gave birth to twins in September 2013.
