= Burch Smith =

American baseball player (born 1990)

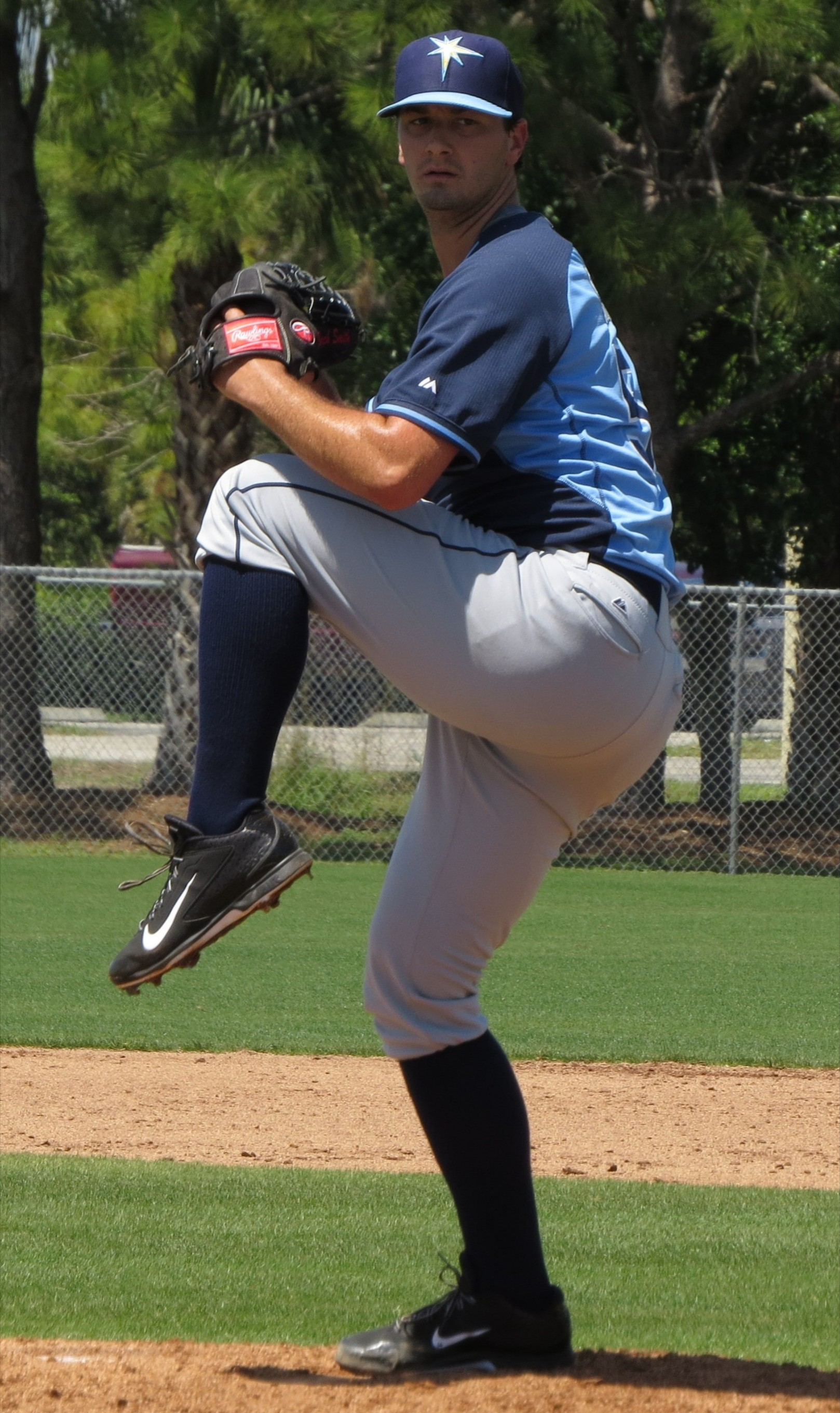
- Smith with the Tampa Bay Rays in 2015

Free agent
- Pitcher
- Born: April 12, 1990 (age 36); San Antonio, Texas, U.S.
- Bats: Right Throws: Right

Professional debut
- MLB: May 11, 2013, for the San Diego Padres
- NPB: April 19, 2022, for the Saitama Seibu Lions
- KBO: April 1, 2023, for the Hanwha Eagles

MLB statistics (through 2026 season)
- Win–loss record: 9–14
- Earned run average: 5.62
- Strikeouts: 250

NPB statistics (through 2022 season)
- Win–loss record: 1–0
- Earned run average: 3.29
- Strikeouts: 37

KBO statistics (through 2023 season)
- Win–loss record: 0–0
- Earned run average: 6.75
- Strikeouts: 2
- Stats at Baseball Reference

Teams
- San Diego Padres (2013); Kansas City Royals (2018); Milwaukee Brewers (2019); San Francisco Giants (2019); Oakland Athletics (2020–2021); Saitama Seibu Lions (2022); Hanwha Eagles (2023); Miami Marlins (2024); Baltimore Orioles (2024); Detroit Tigers (2026)

Burch Taylor Smith (born April 12, 1990) is an American professional baseball pitcher who is a free agent. He has played in Major League Baseball (MLB) for the San Diego Padres, Kansas City Royals, Milwaukee Brewers, San Francisco Giants, Oakland Athletics, Miami Marlins, Baltimore Orioles, and Detroit Tigers. He has also played in Nippon Professional Baseball (NPB) for the Saitama Seibu Lions, and in the KBO League for the Hanwha Eagles. Smith was drafted by the Padres in the 11th round of the 2011 MLB draft and made his MLB debut for the team in 2013.

== Amateur career ==
Smith attended Robert E. Lee High School in Tyler, Texas. Pitching for the baseball team, in his high school career he was 11–3 with a 1.68 ERA and 153 strikeouts in 150 innings.

At Howard College, Smith's team was the 2009 NCJAA National Champion as he was 4–0 with a 3.05 ERA, and he was named the 2010 Western Junior College Athletic Conference Pitcher of the Year, after going 11–2 with a 2.50 ERA. Smith was drafted by the Cleveland Indians in the 49th round of the 2009 Major League Baseball draft and the 20th round of the 2010 Major League Baseball draft out of Howard, but did not sign either time. He then attended the University of Oklahoma as a junior, going 10–4, and was 2011 All-Big 12 honorable mention.

== Professional career ==
=== San Diego Padres ===
The San Diego Padres selected Smith in the 14th round of the 2011 Major League Baseball draft; he signed for a signing bonus of $250,000.

Pitching for the High–A Lake Elsinore Storm in 2012, Smith went 9–6 with a 3.85 earned run average and 137 strikeouts. He started the 2013 season with the Double-A San Antonio Missions. He was named the Texas League Pitcher of the Week in April 2013, and the Padres Minor League Pitcher of the Month for April with a 1.38 ERA over five starts. Smith made his Major League debut Saturday, May 11, 2013, against the Tampa Bay Rays as he was called up from Double-A.

In his Major League debut, Smith pitched a clean first inning, striking out his first two batters, but he did not record an out in the second, giving up six earned runs on five hits. He was sent down to the Tucson Padres of the Triple-A Pacific Coast League (PCL) on May 22 after allowing 15 earned runs in three starts. He was recalled on June 8, but did not make an appearance before he was optioned back to Tucson on June 10. He came back to the Major League club on June 28 after posting a 2.54 ERA in five starts overall with Tucson. Smith joined the bullpen where he made three appearances before being sent down again on July 5.

Smith made seven more starts for Tucson, striking out 10 in his final appearance, and then returned to the Padres' rotation with the September roster expansion. He made four more starts for the Padres in 2013, allowing 10 runs with 31 strikeouts.

=== Tampa Bay Rays ===
On December 19, 2014, the Padres traded Smith, Jake Bauers, and René Rivera to the Tampa Bay Rays in a three-team trade that saw the Rays trade Wil Myers, Jose Castillo and Ryan Hanigan to the Padres, the Padres trade Joe Ross and a player to be named later to the Washington Nationals, and Washington trade Steven Souza and Travis Ott to Tampa Bay. Smith missed the 2015 season after having Tommy John surgery and was outrighted following the season.

=== Kansas City Royals ===
The New York Mets selected Smith in the Rule 5 draft on December 14, 2017, and immediately traded him to the Kansas City Royals for cash considerations. After a strong spring training, Smith was chosen as a member of the bullpen for Opening Day. In 2018 with Kansas City he was 1–6 with a 6.92 ERA in 38 games (6 starts), in which he pitched 78 innings.

On November 26, 2018, Smith was designated for assignment.

=== Milwaukee Brewers ===
On January 11, 2019, Smith signed a minor league contract with the Milwaukee Brewers. He was assigned to the San Antonio Missions of the PCL to start the 2019 season, for whom he was 6–3 with a 2.33 ERA in 15 starts, in which he pitched 77 1/3 innings and struck out 85 batters. He had his contract selected to the major leagues on May 5. With the Brewers, he was 0–1 with a 7.82 ERA in 12 2/3 innings. On August 9, Smith was designated for assignment.

=== San Francisco Giants ===
On August 12, 2019, Smith was claimed off waivers by the San Francisco Giants. With the Sacramento River Cats of the PCL, he was 1–1 with a 4.20 ERA in 15 innings in which he struck out 18 batters. With the Giants, he was 0–0 with a 2.08 ERA in eight innings. Smith was designated for assignment by the Giants on February 10, 2020.

=== Oakland Athletics ===
On February 15, 2020, the Giants traded Smith to the Oakland Athletics in exchange for cash considerations. This trade was the first swap involving a major league player between the Bay Area rivals since December 4, 1990, when the Athletics acquired Ernest Riles from the Giants for Darren Lewis and minor league starting pitcher Pedro Pena.

Smith picked up wins in his first two appearances for the Athletics, in which he allowed two hits and a walk in three scoreless innings combined. He was credited with his first career save on August 7, 2020, by throwing the last three innings of a 7–2 win over the Houston Astros, during which he allowed only one hit and no runs. On August 17, Smith was placed on the 10-day injured list with a forearm strain, two days after surrendering his first runs of the season to his former team, the Giants, on a three-run home run. In 6 games for the A's, Smith registered an ERA of 2.25 in 12 innings.

Smith pitched in 31 games for Oakland in 2021, going 1-1 with a 5.40 ERA and 28 strikeouts. On September 14, 2021, the A's designated Smith for assignment. On October 12, Smith elected free agency.

=== Saitama Seibu Lions ===
On January 18, 2022, Smith signed with the Saitama Seibu Lions of Nippon Professional Baseball (NPB).

=== Hanwha Eagles ===
On December 18, 2022, Smith signed with the Hanwha Eagles of the Korea Baseball Organization. He was released on April 19, 2023, after suffering a strain in his throwing shoulder. Smith had suffered the injury in his only appearance for Hanwha, a start in which he exited partway through the third inning. During his brief tenure with the Eagles, Smith drew criticism in South Korean media following an exchange on social media with a fan, in which he used the phrase "your garbage country".

=== Miami Marlins ===
On January 2, 2024, Smith signed a minor league contract with the Tampa Bay Rays. On March 27, after exercising the upward mobility clause in his contract, he was traded to the Miami Marlins in exchange for cash considerations and subsequently selected to the 40–man roster. In 25 appearances for the Marlins, Smith compiled a 4.25 ERA with 23 strikeouts across 29 2/3 innings pitched. On June 14, Smith was designated for assignment by Miami. He was released by the Marlins organization on June 20.

=== Baltimore Orioles ===
On June 28, 2024, Smith signed a minor league contract with the Baltimore Orioles. After two scoreless appearances for the Triple–A Norfolk Tides, Baltimore selected Smith's contract, adding him to the active roster. In 25 appearances for the Orioles, Smith compiled a 2–1 record and 5.74 ERA with 23 strikeouts across 26 2/3 innings pitched. On October 31, Smith was removed from the 40–man roster and sent outright to Norfolk, but rejected the assignment in favor of free agency.

=== Pittsburgh Pirates ===
On January 6, 2025, Smith signed a minor league contract with the Pittsburgh Pirates. In 20 appearances split between the Single-A Bradenton Marauders and Triple-A Indianapolis Indians, he logged a 2-0 record and 6.75 ERA with 28 strikeouts across 21 1/3 innings pitched. Smith was released by the Pirates organization on July 27.

=== Detroit Tigers ===
On December 23, 2025, Smith signed a minor league contract with the Detroit Tigers. He was assigned to the Triple-A Toledo Mud Hens to begin the regular season, where he recorded a 1.80 ERA with 16 strikeouts and one save over 10 innings of work. On April 22, 2026, the Tigers selected Smith's contract, adding him to their active roster. On May 22, he was placed on the injured list due to right shoulder inflammation. Smith was transferred to the 60–day injured list on June 23. On September 3, Smith underwent an arthroscopic procedure on his throwing shoulder.

== See also ==
- Rule 5 draft results
