= Jake Bauers =

American baseball player (born 1995)

- Bauers with the Brewers in 2026

Boston Red Sox – No. 18
- First baseman / Outfielder
- Born: October 6, 1995 (age 31); Newport Beach, California, U.S.
- Bats: Left Throws: Left

MLB debut
- June 7, 2018, for the Tampa Bay Rays

MLB statistics (through 2026 season)
- Batting average: .223
- Home runs: 84
- Runs batted in: 297
- Stats at Baseball Reference

Teams
- Tampa Bay Rays (2018); Cleveland Indians (2019, 2021); Seattle Mariners (2021); New York Yankees (2023); Milwaukee Brewers (2024–2026)

Career highlights and awards
- World Series champion (2026); NLCS MVP (2026); Silver Slugger Award (2026)

Jakob Christopher Bauers (born October 6, 1995) is an American professional baseball first baseman, outfielder and designated hitter for the Boston Red Sox of Major League Baseball (MLB). He has previously played for the Tampa Bay Rays, Cleveland Indians, Seattle Mariners, New York Yankees, and Milwaukee Brewers.

== Amateur career ==
Bauers played amateur baseball with Ocean View Little League and with a travel baseball team based in Huntington Beach, California. He attended Marina High School in Huntington Beach, where he played for the school's baseball team and as a senior in 2013 led the Vikings to the California Interscholastic Federation's Southern Section Division 1 finals at Dodger Stadium. He committed to attend the University of Hawaii on a college baseball scholarship.

== Professional career ==
=== San Diego Padres ===
The San Diego Padres selected Bauers in the seventh round, with the 208th overall selection, of the 2013 Major League Baseball draft. Bauers spent his first professional season with the Arizona Padres of the Rookie-level Arizona League, posting a .282 batting average in 47 games. In 2014, Bauers played for the Fort Wayne TinCaps of the Single-A Midwest League where he batted .296 with eight home runs and 64 RBI in 112 games. He was named a postseason All-Star.

=== Tampa Bay Rays ===
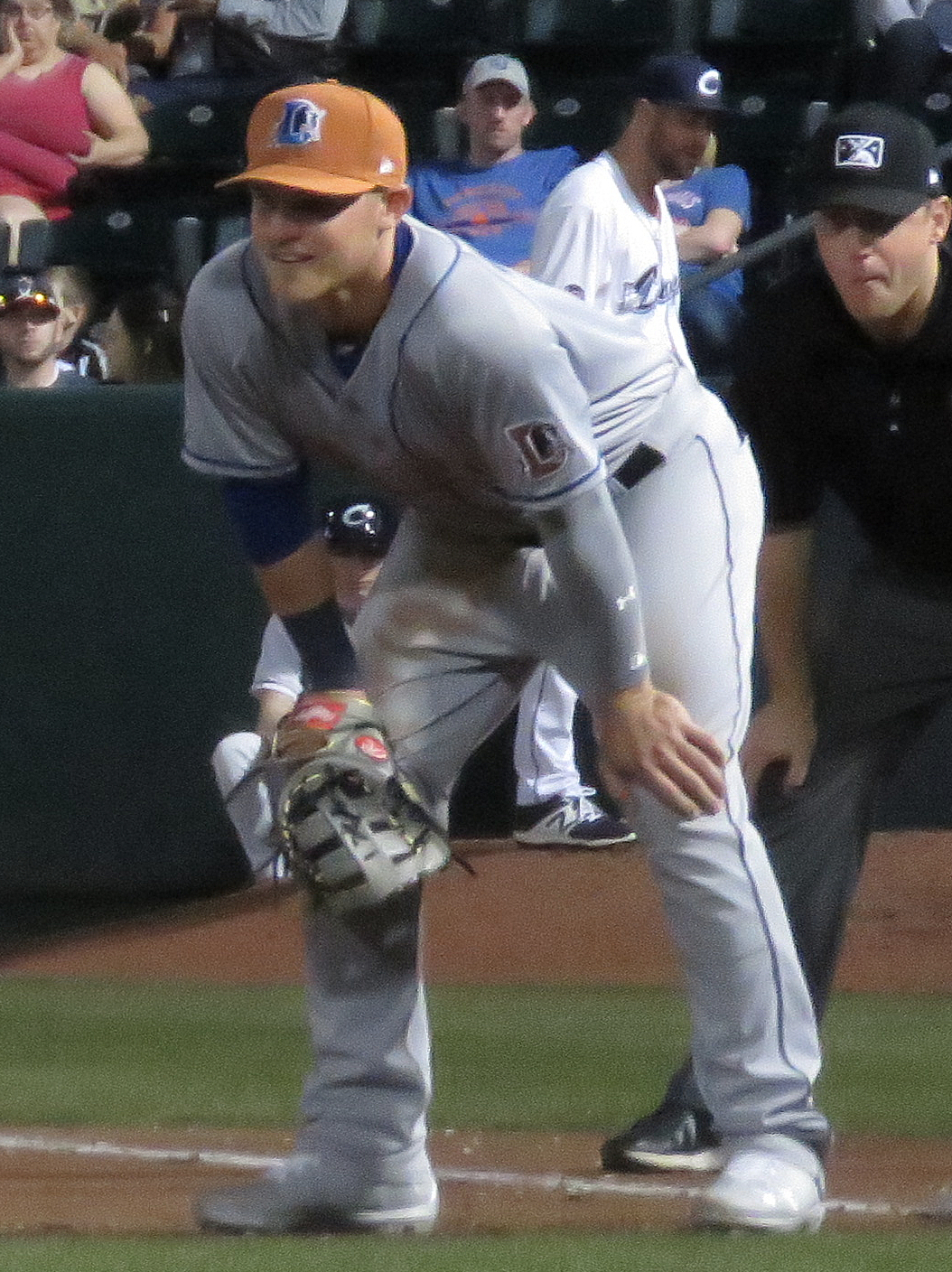
Bauers with the Durham Bulls in 2018

On December 19, 2014, the Padres traded Bauers, Burch Smith, and René Rivera to the Tampa Bay Rays in a three-team trade that saw the Rays trade Wil Myers, Jose Castillo and Ryan Hanigan to the Padres, the Padres trade Joe Ross and a player to be named later (Trea Turner) to the Washington Nationals, and Washington traded Steven Souza and Travis Ott to Tampa Bay. He began the 2015 season with the Charlotte Stone Crabs of the High-A Florida State League, and was promoted to the Montgomery Biscuits of the Double-A Southern League in June. He finished the 2015 season with a combined .272 batting average with 11 home runs and 74 RBI in 128 games between both teams. He stayed with the Biscuits for the 2016 season and batted .274 with 14 home runs and 78 RBI in 135 games. Bauers spent the 2017 season with the Durham Bulls of the Triple-A International League where he batted .263 with 13 home runs, 63 RBI and a career high twenty stolen bases in 132 games. The Rays added Bauers to their 40–man roster after the season, in order to protect him from the Rule 5 draft. Bauers returned to Durham at the beginning of the 2018 season.

The Rays promoted Bauers to the major leagues for the first time on June 7, 2018, and he made his major league debut the same night. In 52 games for Durham prior to his promotion, he was batting .279 with five home runs and 24 RBI. Bauers recorded his first major league hit, a double, on June 9 off of Seattle Mariners pitcher Félix Hernández. On June 24, Bauers hit his first career walk-off, a home run, against Chasen Shreve of the New York Yankees to finish a three-game sweep. Bauers homered in three straight games from July 29 to August 1. On August 23, Bauers scored the walk-off run, beating out a throw to home plate from Kansas City Royals first baseman Ryan O'Hearn to secure a four-game sweep. In 96 games, he hit .201 with 11 home runs and 46 RBI.

=== Cleveland Indians ===
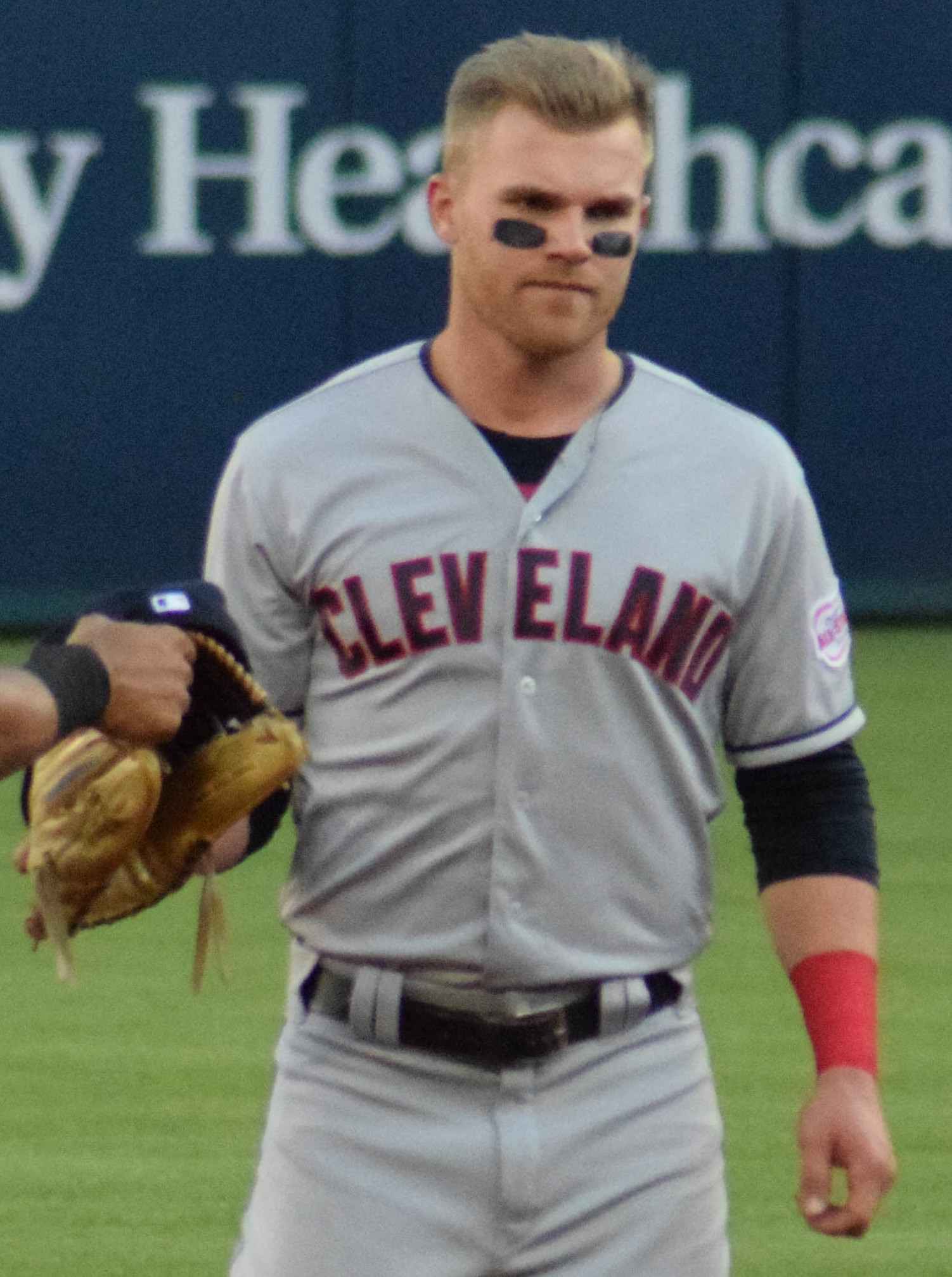
Bauers with the Indians in 2019

On December 13, 2018, the Rays traded Bauers to the Cleveland Indians in a three-team trade in which the Rays acquired Yandy Díaz and Cole Sulser, and the Seattle Mariners acquired Edwin Encarnación from the Indians for Carlos Santana. On June 14, 2019, Bauers hit for the cycle against the Detroit Tigers. Bauers was sent down to the Triple-A Columbus Clippers on August 1; he was hitting .233 with 11 home runs in 100 games. Bauers did not make an appearance for the Indians in 2020.

In 2021, Bauers struggled to a .190/.277/.280 batting line with two home runs and six RBI in 43 games before being designated for assignment on June 5, 2021.

=== Seattle Mariners ===
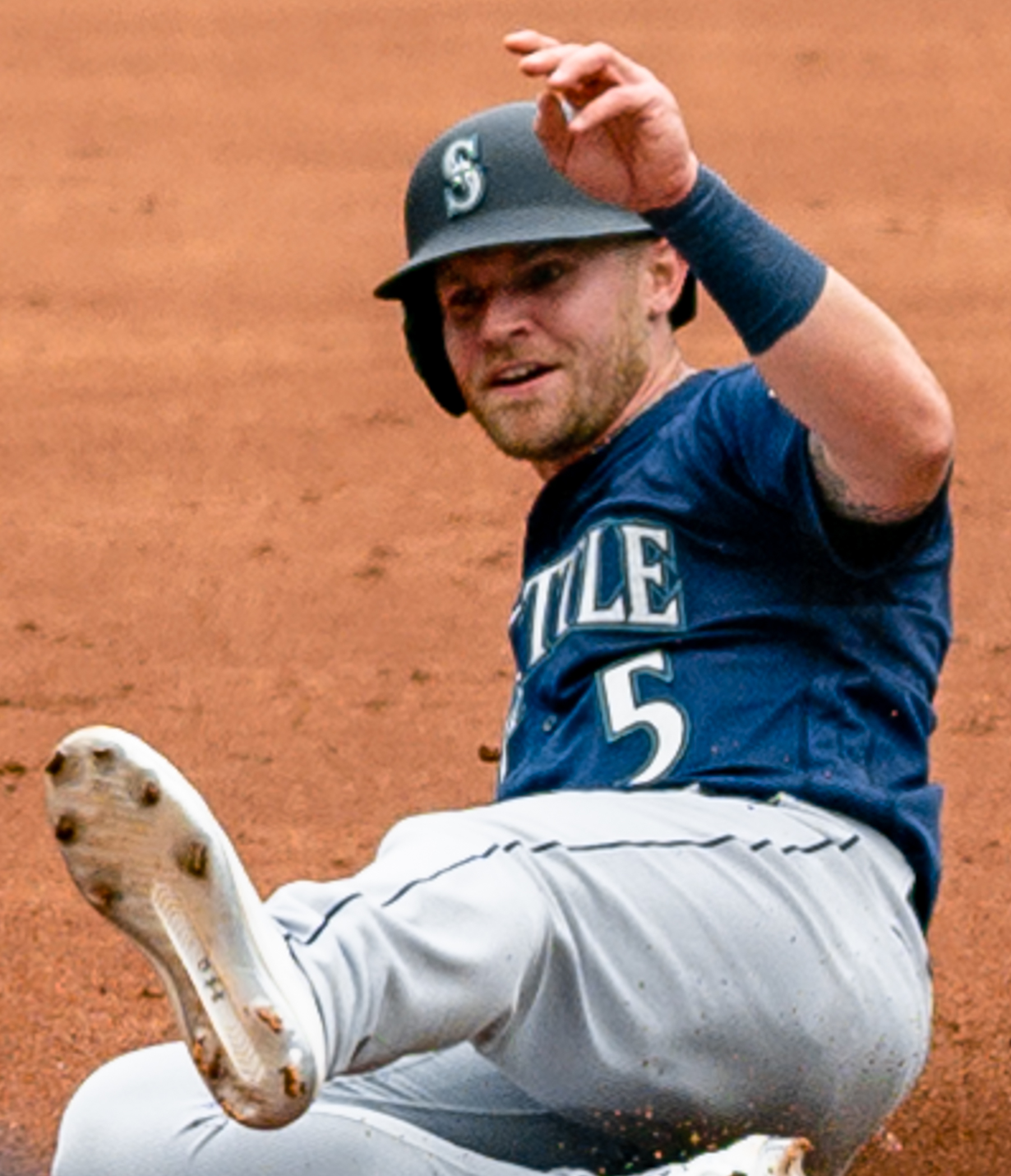
Bauers with the Seattle Mariners in 2021

On June 10, 2021, the Indians traded Bauers to the Seattle Mariners in exchange for a player to be named later or cash (pitching prospect Damon Casetta-Stubbs was sent to the Indians on July 9 as the PTBNL). He made his Mariners debut that day, and notched a hit in his first at-bat with the team, a single off of Detroit Tigers starter Tyler Alexander. On September 19, against the Kansas City Royals, Bauers hit a home run with a projected distance of 460 ft – the longest homer by a Mariner since Mike Zunino in 2018, with only Zunino, Nelson Cruz, and Lázaro Montes having gone longer as Mariners since the 2015 season. Bauers played in 72 games for the Mariners, hitting .220 with two home runs and 13 RBI. He became a free agent following the season.

=== Cincinnati Reds ===
On December 20, 2021, Bauers signed a minor league contract with the Cincinnati Reds. Bauers began 2022 with the Triple-A Louisville Bats, hitting .135 with three home runs in 29 games.

=== New York Yankees ===
On June 3, 2022, Bauers was traded to the New York Yankees in exchange for cash considerations. He spent the remainder of the year with the Triple-A Scranton/Wilkes-Barre RailRiders, where the Yankees worked with Bauers to change his swing. He hit .226/.352/.406 with five home runs and 16 RBI across 32 contests for the RailRiders. He elected free agency following the season on November 10. On December 14, Bauers re–signed with the Yankees on a minor league contract.

Playing in 21 games for Scranton to begin the 2023 season, Bauers hit .304/.488/.797 with nine home runs, 20 RBI, and five stolen bases. On April 29, Bauers had his contract selected to the active roster. He had his first multi-homer game on June 3 against the Los Angeles Dodgers.

=== Milwaukee Brewers ===
Bauers (right) and teammate Sal Frelick during the 2026 World Series victory parade

On November 17, 2023, the Yankees traded Bauers to the Milwaukee Brewers in exchange for minor league outfielders Jace Avina and Brian Sánchez. In 116 games for the Brewers in 2024, he slashed .199/.301/.361 with 12 home runs, 43 RBI, and 13 stolen bases. On November 4, Bauers was removed from the 40–man roster and sent outright to the Triple–A Nashville Sounds, but he rejected the assignment and elected free agency. He decided to retire from baseball and become a stay-at-home dad, but was forced to return to the minors as his pregnant wife needed health insurance.

On January 6, 2025, Bauers re-signed with the Brewers on a minor league contract. On March 27, the Brewers selected Bauers's contract after he made the team's Opening Day roster. Bauers went on to hit .235 with seven home runs in platooning in the outfield and at first base. He continued platooning in both positions in 2026 and had his best offensive season, hitting .266 with 26 homers and 86 runs batted in across 144 games.

In Game 2 of the 2026 National League Championship Series (NLCS), Bauers faced Yoshinobu Yamamoto and walked on a 12 pitch at-bat, the longest of Yamamoto's career, which helped to tire out the Dodgers ace. Bauers repeated his long performance in the next game, with an 11 pitch at–bat vs. Blake Snell, ending in a go-ahead home run. For his heroics in that game, along with posting six RBI in the series and his other contributions, he was named the NLCS MVP. The Brewers went on to win the World Series, their first championship in franchise history, defeating the Tampa Bay Rays in five games.

=== Boston Red Sox ===
On November 17, 2026, Bauers signed a four-year, $58 million contract with the Boston Red Sox.

== Personal life ==
Bauers is married to Lauren Bauers. The couple has two children.

== See also ==
- List of Milwaukee Brewers award winners and All-Stars

Achievements
Preceded by Shohei Ohtani	Hitting for the cycle June 14, 2019	Succeeded by Trea Turner
