= Ryan Hanigan =

American baseball player (born 1980)

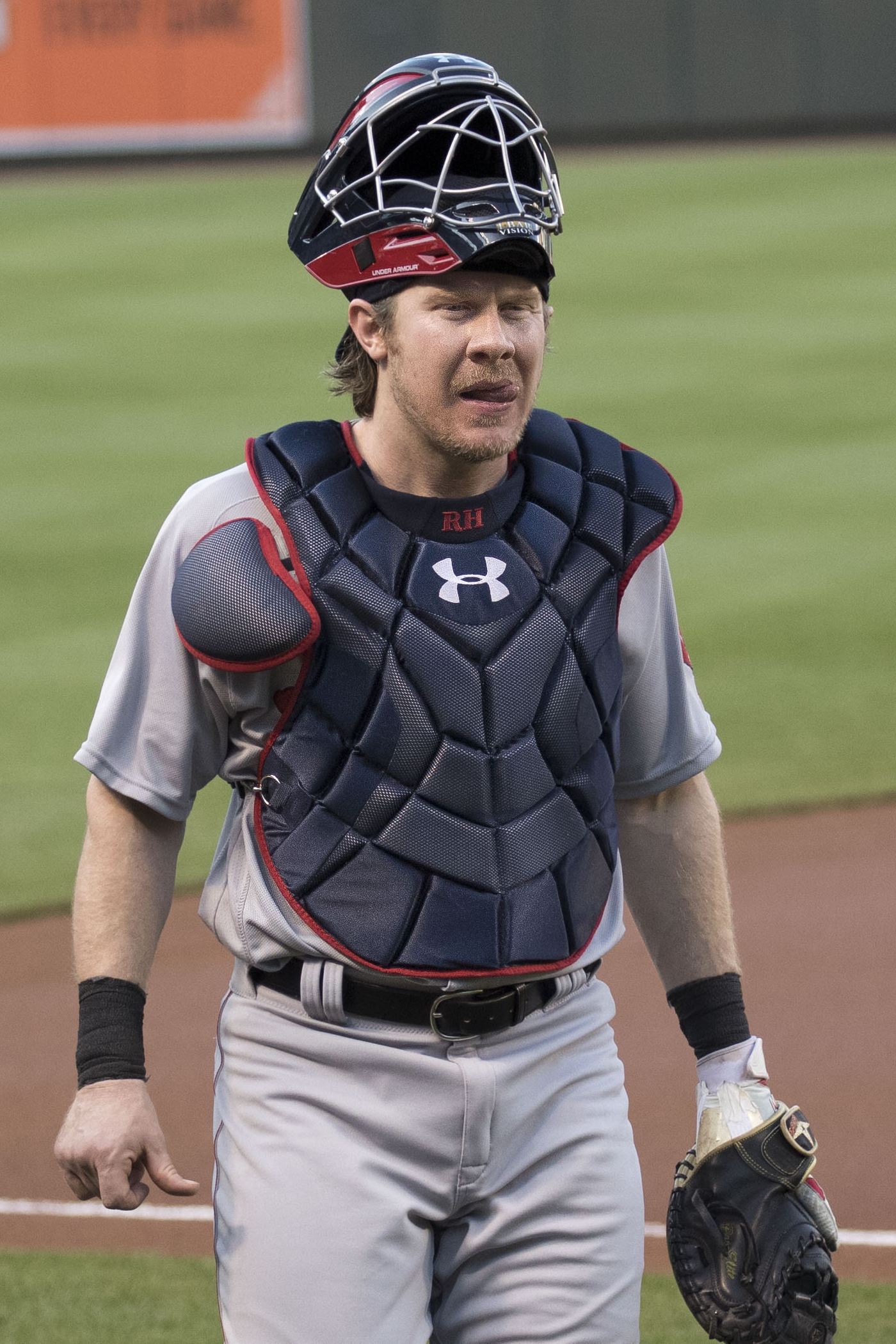
- Hanigan with the Boston Red Sox in 2016
- Catcher
- Born: August 16, 1980 (age 46); Washington, D.C., U.S.
- Batted: Right Threw: Right

MLB debut
- September 9, 2007, for the Cincinnati Reds

Last MLB appearance
- October 1, 2017, for the Colorado Rockies

MLB statistics
- Batting average: .251
- Home runs: 30
- Runs batted in: 214
- Stats at Baseball Reference

Teams
- As player: Cincinnati Reds (2007–2013); Tampa Bay Rays (2014); Boston Red Sox (2015–2016); Colorado Rockies (2017)

Ryan Michael Hanigan (born August 16, 1980) is an American former professional baseball catcher. He played in Major League Baseball (MLB) for the Cincinnati Reds, Tampa Bay Rays, Boston Red Sox, and Colorado Rockies.

After graduating from Andover High School in 1999, Hanigan attended Rollins College, where he signed as an undrafted free agent with the Cincinnati Reds. He then spent the 2002 to 2006 seasons with Reds minor league baseball teams, including the Dayton Dragons and Louisville Bats. He made his MLB debut in 2007. While with the Reds he caught two no hitters, both thrown by Homer Bailey.

== Early life ==
Hanigan was born in Washington, D.C., to Mike and Helen Hanigan. He has an older sister named Hayley. He played American Legion Baseball for American Legion Post 8 in Andover. At Andover High School, Hanigan was a three-year varsity starter, and was named an Eagle-Tribune and Eastern Massachusetts All-Star during his senior season, in which he hit .397. From 1997 to 1998, the Andover team had a 38–9 record. He was teammates with future professional golfer Rob Oppenheim, and graduated from the school in 1999.

== College career ==
After graduating from high school, Hanigan had a difficult time finding a college that would let him play baseball. He attended Rollins College in Winter Park, Florida, where he played third base or left field because of an upperclassman at the catcher position. During the summer in 2001, Hanigan played in the New England Collegiate Baseball League, where he hit .282 in 38 games. In his junior year, he hit .384 with 48 RBIs over 57 games for Rollins, as the team finished 41–16 and clinched a berth to the NCAA Division II Baseball Championship. Hanigan would have served as team captain his senior year; when he left Rollins, Hanigan's .359 career batting average was seventh best in school history.

In 2002, Hanigan played collegiate summer baseball in the Cape Cod League for Orleans Cardinals, where he was named the Top New England Prospect and an All-Star, and was awarded the Charles F. Moore Sr. award for the most valuable player on the Cardinals team. John Brickley, a scout for the Reds, signed him as a free agent on August 23, although six other teams "showed interest" in signing the catcher.

== Professional career ==
=== Cincinnati Reds ===
In 2002, Hanigan began his career with the Reds' organization when he played in six minor league games for the Dayton Dragons of the Midwest League, batting .273 with three hits. On April 28, 2003, in a game against the Quad City River Bandits, he went 4–5 with three RBIs. Hanigan was named to the East squad in the Midwest League All-Star Game, where he served as the reserve catcher. Later in July, he was placed on the disabled list (DL) with a high ankle sprain; up until then, he was hitting .283 with 26 RBIs. Hanigan finished the season batting .277 with a home run and 31 RBIs, which earned him a promotion to the Triple-A Louisville Bats. In one game for the Bats, he went 1–3.

Hanigan spent the entire 2004 season with the Class A-Advanced Potomac Cannons, where he served as the team's catcher and designated hitter. From July 6 to 29, he had a 22-game hit streak, the longest in the Carolina League for the year. On August 24, he hit in the game-winning run against the Salem Avalanche with two outs in the bottom of the ninth inning. For the season, Hanigan hit .296 with five home runs and 56 RBIs over 119 games as the Cannons made the Carolina League Northern Division playoffs for the first time since 1995.

The following season, Hanigan played for the Double-A Chattanooga Lookouts. On August 29, 2005, he hit a grand slam against the West Tennessee Diamond Jaxx as the Lookouts lost, 10–12. After the season, he was selected by the Reds to represent the organization in the Arizona Fall League, and was a non-roster invitee to the Reds 2006 spring training camp. In 2006, Hanigan appeared in 56 games for the Lookouts as well as eight games for the Bats. During a July 13, 2006, contest, Hanigan drove in what would be the winning run with two outs in the seventh inning against the Birmingham Barons. For the season, he hit .246 for the Lookouts and .154 for the Bats.

"I didn't have any time to waste ... I was running in from the bullpen, didn't have a time to get nervous. I tried to enjoy it, pick out a pitch I could handle, put a good swing on it and it all worked out."

— Hanigan on MLB debut

Playing for the Lookouts, Hanigan was selected to the Southern League All-Star Game in June 2007. He was promoted to the Bats on June 28, 2007, after reaching base safely in 40 of his last 42 games for the Lookouts, including three four-hit games. He was called up to the major-league squad on September 1. Hanigan made his MLB debut on September 9 against the Milwaukee Brewers. Pinch hitting for Kirk Saarloos, he doubled to left field off the first pitch from All-Star Ben Sheets, and later scored a run on a wild pitch. For the MLB Reds, Hanigan hit .300 in five games played, with two RBIs and a double. During the off-season, he played in the Dominican Professional Baseball League for the Leones del Escogido.

Playing for the Bats in 2008, Hanigan was a mid-season and postseason International League (IL) All-Star, and was named the best defensive catcher in the IL by Baseball America. He was called up to the majors on August 10, 2008, after David Ross was designated for assignment by the Reds; 18 days later, he hit a home run in the eighth inning to score what would be the winning run against the Houston Astros. After batting .271 in 31 games for the Reds, Hanigan was ranked as the 16th best prospect in the Reds minor league system by Baseball America.

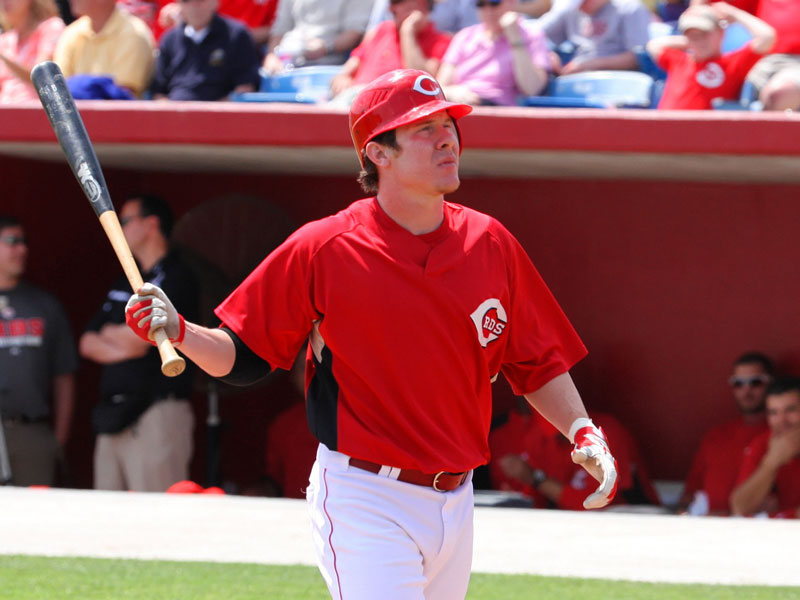
Hanigan playing for the Cincinnati Reds in 2009 spring training

Hanigan spent the entire 2009 season with the Reds except for five games with the Bats. He served as the backup catcher to Ramón Hernández until Hernández underwent knee surgery and was placed on the DL. Hanigan went on the DL after he was hit on the face mask by a foul tip and suffered a concussion; he returned on August 8, 2009. For the season, Hanigan had the best fielding percentage as a catcher (.998), and the second best caught stealing percentage (42.9) in the majors.

On March 14, 2011, Hanigan signed a three-year, $4 million extension with the Reds, covering his first two arbitration-eligible seasons. The contract also included up to $800,000 in incentives based on playing time, split for the 2012 and 2013 seasons. The deal included a $300,000 signing bonus.

On April 3, 2011, he set career records by hitting more than one home run and getting four hits in a single game. Against Chicago Cubs pitcher Sean Marshall, Hanigan drove in the tie-breaking run in what was an 8–7 win for the Reds on August 7. He finished the year batting .267 with an on-base percentage of .356 and a career-high of six home runs.

In 2012 and 2013, Hanigan split time catching with Reds' prospect Devin Mesoraco. Hanigan caught both of Homer Bailey's no-hitters, against the Pittsburgh Pirates on September 28, 2012, and against the San Francisco Giants on July 2, 2013.

=== Tampa Bay Rays ===
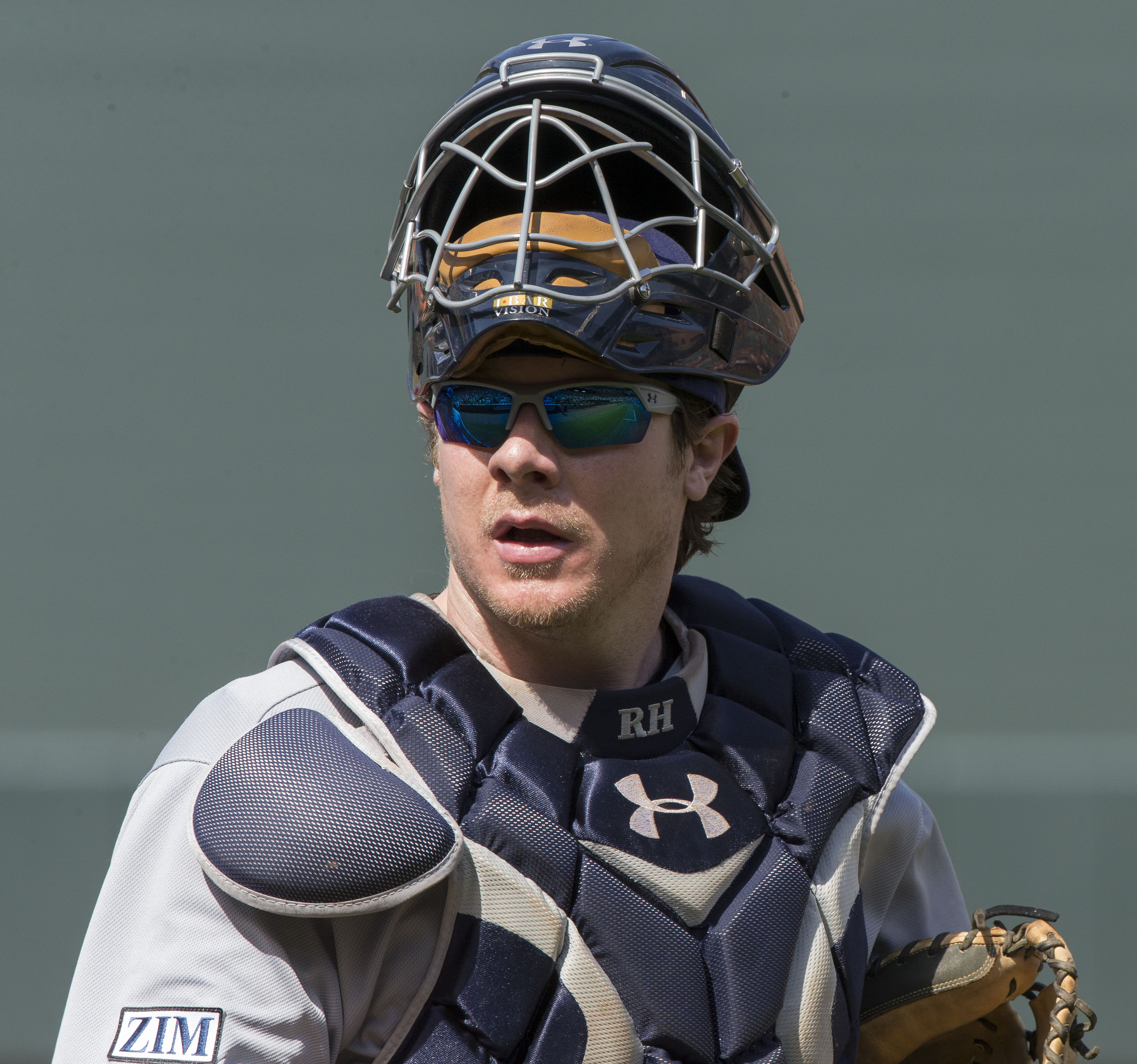
Hanigan during his tenure with the Tampa Bay Rays in 2014

On December 3, 2013, Hanigan was traded to the Tampa Bay Rays as part of a three-team trade also involving the Arizona Diamondbacks. The Rays immediately signed him to a three-year, $10.75 million contract through 2016, with a team option for 2017.

Playing as the Rays' primary catcher, on April 4 he went 2–5 with a three-run homer in a win over the Texas Rangers. Two weeks later he hit two home runs with six RBIs in a 16–1 win over the New York Yankees. In May, Hanigan, plagued for nearly two weeks by a strained hamstring, was finally placed on the 15-day DL on May 28. On June 17 he had a home run and a walk against the Baltimore Orioles, but he then missed several more games due to neck stiffness and later with soreness in his left side.

=== Boston Red Sox ===
On December 19, 2014, the Rays traded Hanigan and Wil Myers to the San Diego Padres as part of a three-team transaction, in which the Padres traded Jake Bauers, Burch Smith, and René Rivera to the Rays, the Padres trade Joe Ross and a player to be named later to the Washington Nationals, and Washington traded Steven Souza and Travis Ott to Tampa Bay. The Padres then traded him, later that same day, to the Boston Red Sox for Will Middlebrooks. On April 17, 2015, Hanigan hit his first home run in a Red Sox uniform off of Ubaldo Jiménez of the Baltimore Orioles. The two run shot tied the game that Boston eventually won in walk-off fashion. On May 1, 2015, Hanigan left the game after a ball struck his hand after Mark Teixeira got struck in his hand first. The next day, X-rays tested positive that Hanigan's hand was fractured, placing him on the 15-day disabled list. The Red Sox projected that he was going to be out indefinitely but other sources projected that the injury did not end his 2015 year. On May 3, 2015, Hanigan was placed on the 60-day disabled list. For the 2015 season, he batted .247/.337/.328 with two home runs. Hanigan finished the 2016 season with a .171 batting average, and despite playing in only 34 games he led the major leagues in passed balls, with 18. On November 2, 2016, the Red Sox declined to pick up Hanigan's team option, thus making him a free agent.

=== Colorado Rockies ===
Hanigan signed a minor league deal with the Philadelphia Phillies on January 25, 2017. He was released at the end of spring training. After being released by the Phillies, Hanigan agreed to a minor league contract with the Colorado Rockies, on March 28, 2017. He had his contract selected to the major league roster on May 3. He became a free agent following the season.

=== San Francisco Giants ===
On February 12, 2018, Hanigan signed a minor league deal with the Cleveland Indians. He was released on March 19. On May 6, 2018, Hanigan signed a minor league deal with the San Francisco Giants. He was released on July 24, 2018.

== Managerial career ==
In March 2024, the Williamsport Crosscutters hired Hanigan to be their manager during the 2024 MLB Draft League season.

== Personal life ==
Hanigan currently resides in Hollis, New Hampshire. Together with Stephen Blanco, they breed Australian Shepherds, His Australian shepherd won a Best in Breed award at the 2014 Westminster Kennel Club Dog Show.
