= José Castillo (pitcher) =

Venezuelan baseball player (born 1996)

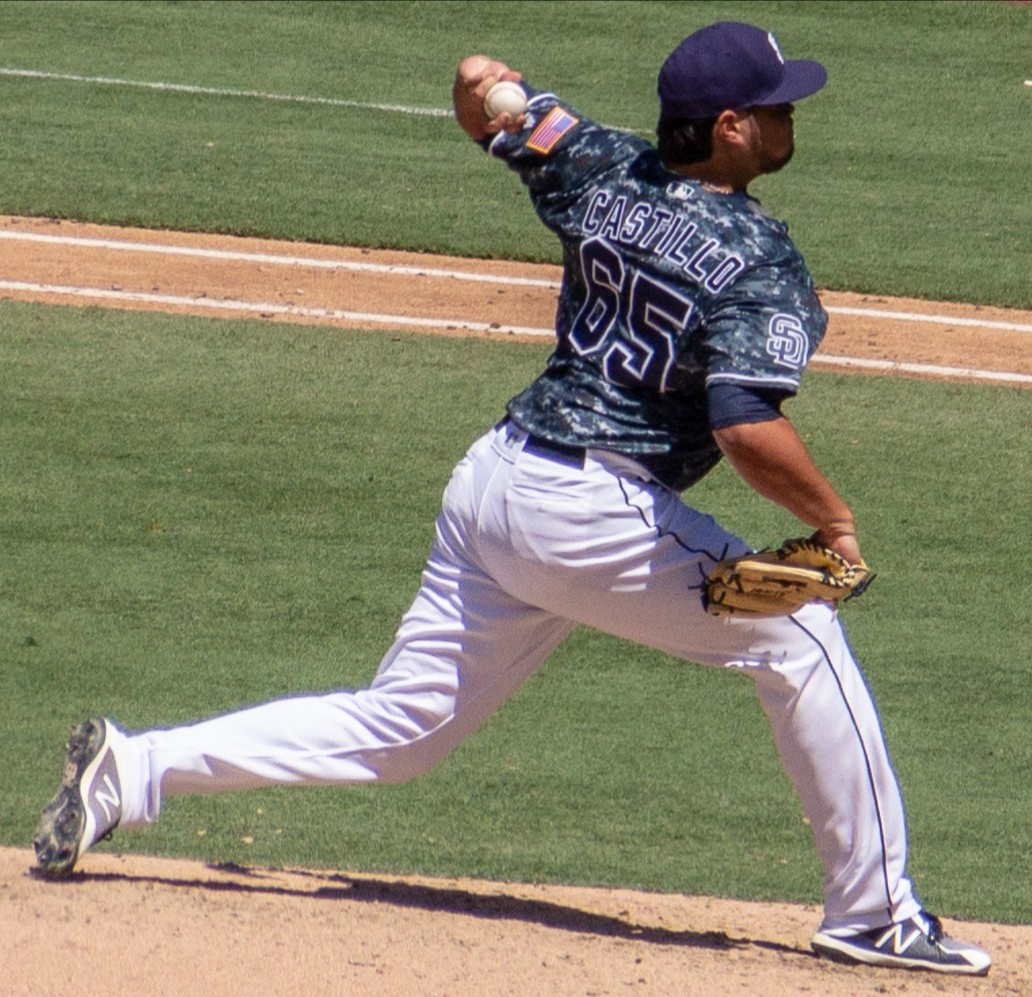
- Castillo with the San Diego Padres in 2018

Chiba Lotte Marines – No. 11
- Pitcher
- Born: January 10, 1996 (age 30); Valencia, Venezuela
- Bats: Left Throws: Left

Professional debut
- MLB: June 2, 2018, for the San Diego Padres
- NPB: March 28, 2026, for the Chiba Lotte Marines

MLB statistics (through 2025 season)
- Win–loss record: 5–5
- Earned run average: 4.11
- Strikeouts: 85

NPB statistics (through August 19, 2026)
- Win–loss record: 0–1
- Earned run average: 1.59
- Strikeouts: 2
- Stats at Baseball Reference

Teams
- San Diego Padres (2018–2019, 2022–2023); Arizona Diamondbacks (2025); New York Mets (2025); Seattle Mariners (2025); Baltimore Orioles (2025); Chiba Lotte Marines (2026–present)

José Gregorio Castillo Tovar (born January 10, 1996) is a Venezuelan professional baseball pitcher for the Chiba Lotte Marines of Nippon Professional Baseball (NPB). He has previously played in Major League Baseball (MLB) for the San Diego Padres, Arizona Diamondbacks, New York Mets, Seattle Mariners, and Baltimore Orioles. He made his MLB debut in 2018.

== Career ==
=== Tampa Bay Rays ===
Castillo signed with the Tampa Bay Rays as an international free agent on July 6, 2012. He made his professional debut with the rookie-level Gulf Coast League Rays in 2013, posting a 2-2 record and 5.87 ERA in 12 games. Castillo returned to the GCL Rays in 2014, recording a 3.86 ERA with four strikeouts across 4 2/3 innings pitched.

=== San Diego Padres ===
The Rays traded Castillo, Wil Myers, Ryan Hanigan and Gerardo Reyes to the San Diego Padres in exchange for René Rivera, Burch Smith and Jake Bauers on December 19, 2014. He split the 2015 season between the Low-A Tri-City Dust Devils and Single-A Fort Wayne TinCaps, accumulating a 4-2 record and 3.74 ERA with 51 strikeouts in 79 1/3 innings pitched across 19 appearances (18 starts).

Castillo split the 2016 season between Tri-City, Fort Wayne, and the High-A Lake Elsinore Storm. In 20 appearances out of the bullpen for the three affiliates, he posted a cumulative 2-2 record and 2.03 ERA with 49 strikeouts and two saves over 40 innings of work.

Castillo was selected as a member of the Venezuela national baseball team at the 2017 World Baseball Classic. He split the regular season between Lake Elsinore and the Double-A San Antonio Missions, accumulating a 4-2 record and 2.88 ERA with 59 strikeouts across 47 relief appearances. On November 21, 2017, the Padres added Castillo to their 40-man roster to protect him from the Rule 5 draft.

Castillo was called up and made his major league debut on June 2, 2018, and pitched a 1-2-3 inning with three strikeouts, including strikeouts of Cincinnati Reds All-Stars Joey Votto and Eugenio Suárez. He ended the season 3–3 with an ERA of 3.29 in 37 games; in 38 1/3 innings, he struck out 52 batters.

Castillo began the 2019 season on the 60-day injured list due to a left flexor strain. He only pitched in 2/3 of an inning for the Padres in 2019, allowing no runs and striking out two, before suffering an injury to his left middle finger and ending the season on the 60-day injured list. Due to the 2020 MLB season being shortened to 60 games because of the COVID-19 pandemic, Castillo ended up missing the entire season due to a left lat strain and a torn ligament in his hand. On March 4, 2021, it was announced that Castillo would require Tommy John surgery after exiting a simulated game on March 2 because of forearm tightness. On March 6, Castillo was placed on the 60-day injured list.

On November 30, 2021, Castillo was non-tendered by the Padres, making him a free agent. On January 14, 2022, he re-signed with the Padres. He had his contract selected on August 23. On November 18, Castillo signed a one-year contract with the Padres, avoiding arbitration.

Castillo began the 2023 season with the Triple–A El Paso Chihuahuas. In 22 contests for El Paso, he struggled to a 9.82 ERA with 22 strikeouts and two saves in 18 1/3 innings pitched. In his only appearance for San Diego, he only recorded one out while surrendering four runs on two hits and two walks with no strikeouts. On July 20, 2023, Castillo was designated for assignment following Robert Suárez's activation from the injured list.

=== Miami Marlins ===
On July 25, 2023, Castillo was traded to the Miami Marlins in exchange for cash considerations. On August 10, he was removed from the 40–man roster and sent outright to the Triple–A Jacksonville Jumbo Shrimp. In 14 games for Jacksonville, he posted a 5.59 ERA with 26 strikeouts in 19 1/3 innings pitched. On October 5, Castillo elected free agency.

=== Arizona Diamondbacks ===
On November 27, 2023, Castillo signed a minor league contract with the Arizona Diamondbacks. He made 21 appearances for the Triple–A Reno Aces in 2024, compiling a 4.35 ERA with 21 strikeouts across 20 2/3 innings pitched. Castillo elected free agency following the season on November 4, 2024.

On November 27, 2024, Castillo re–signed with the Diamondbacks on a new minor league contract. He began the 2025 season with Triple-A Reno, recording a 1.69 ERA with seven strikeouts over his first five games. On May 1, 2025, the Diamondbacks selected Castillo's contract, adding him to their active roster. In five appearances for Arizona, he struggled to an 11.37 ERA with three strikeouts across 6 1/3 innings pitched. Castillo was designated for assignment by the Diamondbacks on May 12.

=== New York Mets ===
On May 15, 2025, Castillo was traded to the New York Mets in exchange for cash considerations. In 13 appearances for New York, he posted an 0-1 record and 2.38 ERA with 14 strikeouts across 11 1/3 innings pitched. Castillo was designated for assignment by the Mets on June 25. He cleared waivers and was sent outright to the Triple-A Syracuse Mets on June 29. On July 25, the Mets added Castillo back to their active roster. He was designated for assignment a second time on July 27. Castillo cleared waivers and was sent outright back to Syracuse on July 31. He had his contract selected back to the major league roster on August 25. He was designated for assignment for a third time on August 30, after two more appearances.

=== Seattle Mariners ===
On September 3, 2025, Castillo was claimed off waivers by the Seattle Mariners. He made three scoreless appearances for Seattle, striking out one and recording one win across three innings pitched. On September 12, Castillo was designated for assignment by the Mariners.

=== Baltimore Orioles ===
On September 15, 2025, Castillo was claimed off waviers by the Baltimore Orioles. In five appearances for the Orioles, Castillo recorded a 2.45 ERA with seven strikeouts across 7 1/3 innings pitched.

On November 6, 2025, Castillo was claimed off waivers by the New York Mets. On November 21, he was non-tendered by New York and became a free agent.

=== Chiba Lotte Marines ===
On November 30, 2025, Castillo signed with the Chiba Lotte Marines of Nippon Professional Baseball.
