= Joe Ross (baseball) =

American baseball player (born 1993)

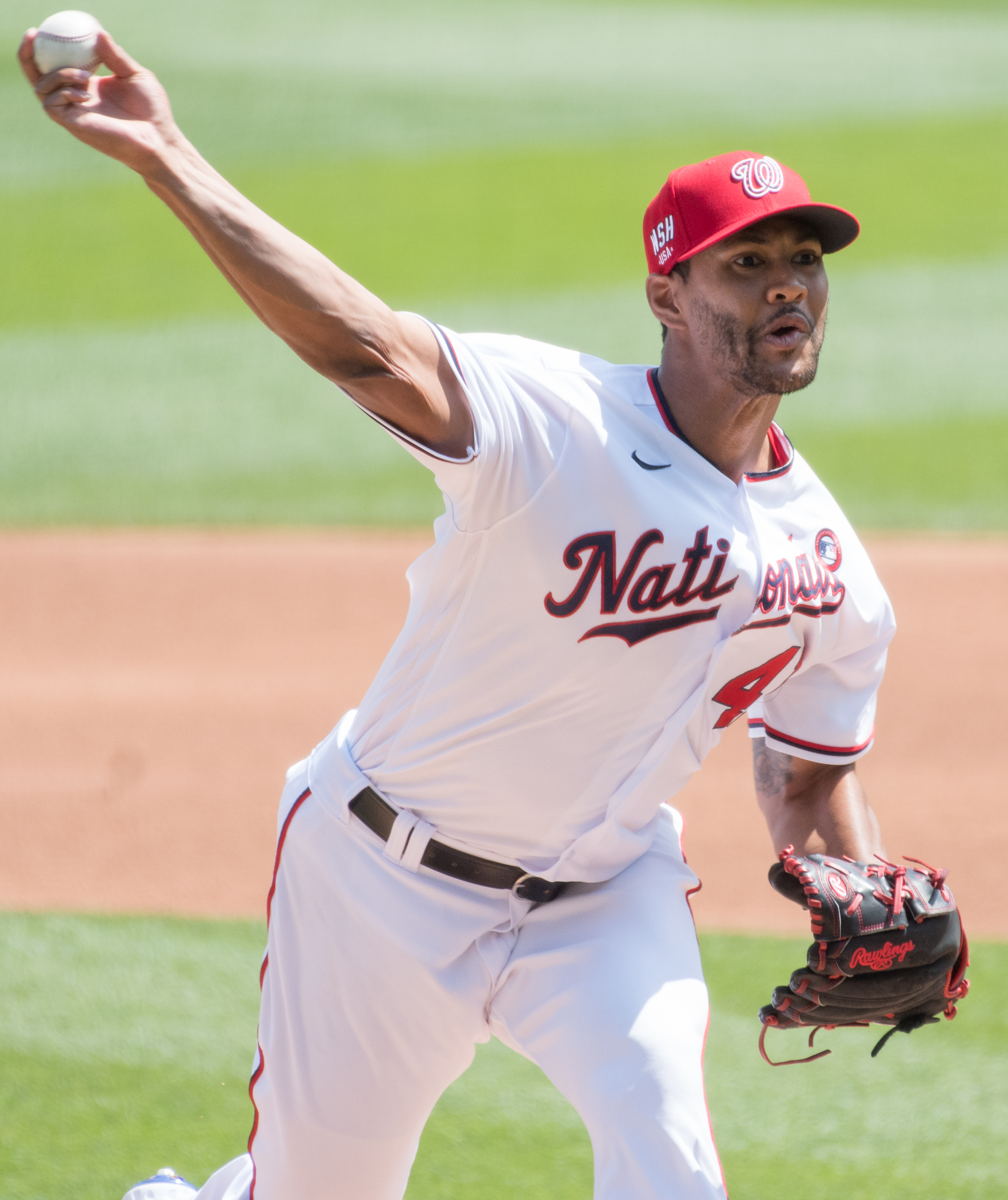
- Ross with the Washington Nationals in 2021

Free agent
- Pitcher
- Born: May 21, 1993 (age 33); Berkeley, California, U.S.
- Bats: Right Throws: Right

MLB debut
- June 6, 2015, for the Washington Nationals

MLB statistics (through 2026 season)
- Win–loss record: 31–36
- Earned run average: 4.38
- Strikeouts: 515
- Stats at Baseball Reference

Teams
- Washington Nationals (2015–2019, 2021); Milwaukee Brewers (2024); Philadelphia Phillies (2025); Arizona Diamondbacks (2026); Texas Rangers (2026)

Career highlights and awards
- World Series champion (2019)

Joseph Andrew Ross (born May 21, 1993) is an American professional baseball pitcher who is a free agent. He has previously played in MLB for the Washington Nationals, Milwaukee Brewers, Philadelphia Phillies, Arizona Diamondbacks, and Texas Rangers. The San Diego Padres selected Ross in the first round of the 2011 MLB draft (25th overall). He made his MLB debut in 2015 with the Nationals.

== Early life ==
Ross was born May 21, 1993, in Berkeley, California, Both of his parents worked in children's medicine: his father Willie as a pediatrician, and his mother Jean as an emergency room nurse. Ross and his siblings played youth baseball at Greenman Field in Oakland, and they would practice hitting together in the family garage. A fan of the Oakland Athletics, Ross made frequent visits to the Oakland Coliseum as a child. At Bishop O'Dowd High School, Ross was both a pitcher and shortstop, although he ultimately transitioned out of the latter position. In his final season of high school baseball, Ross had a 0.79 earned run average (ERA), 101 strikeouts, and only 17 walks in 70 2/3 innings pitched.

== Professional career ==
=== Draft and minor leagues (2011–2014) ===
The San Diego Padres of Major League Baseball (MLB) selected Ross with the 25th overall pick of the 2011 MLB draft. Although he had committed to playing college baseball for the UCLA Bruins, Ross signed with the Padres on August 15, receiving a $2.75 million signing bonus in the process. After signing, Ross reported to the Rookie-level AZL Padres of the Arizona League. He pitched in one game during the 2011 season, allowing two hits in a scoreless inning. At the end of the minor league season, Ross spent time in the Arizona Instructional League, where he adapted to the smaller strike zone in professional baseball.

Ross was one of several young Padres prospects who began the 2012 season with the Single-A Fort Wayne TinCaps of the Midwest League. He struggled in the Midwest League, posting an 0–3 win–loss record and 9.53 ERA in his first three starts. He dropped his season ERA to 6.26 over his next three starts, but went on the disabled list with shoulder tendinitis on May 12. He began a rehab assignment at the end of June, first with the AZL Padres and then with the Low-A Eugene Emeralds of the Northwest League.

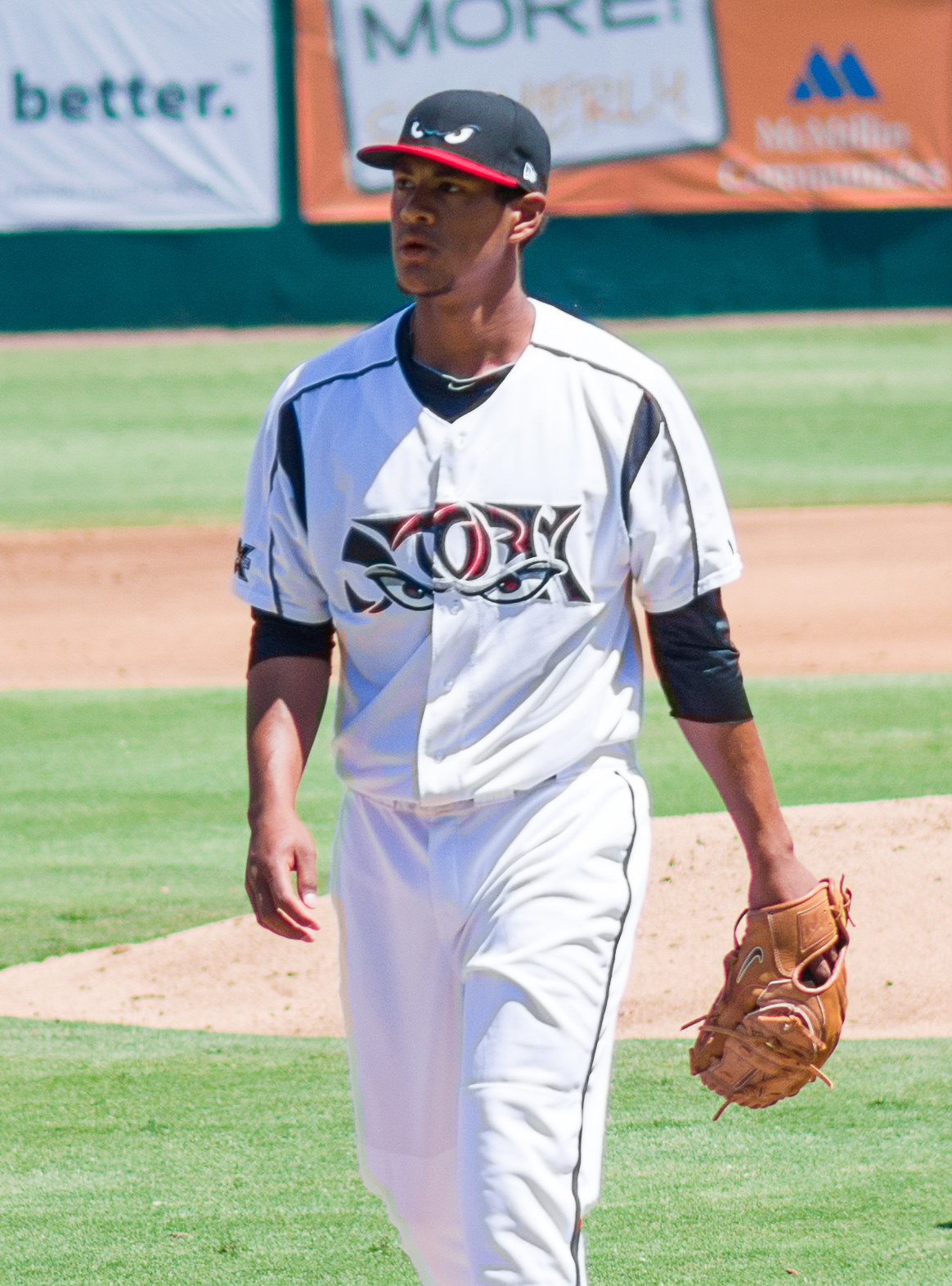
Ross with the Lake Elsinore Storm in 2014

Ross returned for the 2013 season in Fort Wayne.

Ross started the 2014 season with the Lake Elsinore Storm of the High–A California League. He was promoted to the Double-A San Antonio Missions during the season.

=== Washington Nationals (2015–2021) ===
On December 19, 2014, the Padres traded Ross and a player to be named later, Trea Turner, to the Washington Nationals as part of a three-team trade, in which the Padres traded Jake Bauers, Burch Smith, and René Rivera to the Tampa Bay Rays, and Washington traded Steven Souza and Travis Ott to Tampa Bay.

On June 6, 2015, Ross was called up to the Majors for the first time and he made his Major League debut that day as a starting pitcher. Ross outdueled Jimmy Nelson and A. J. Burnett in his second and third starts, respectively, earning wins for the Washington Nationals. He struck out 11 batters in his third appearance, snapping an eight-game winning streak by the Pittsburgh Pirates. On August 6, manager Matt Williams announced Ross would remain in the rotation and veteran starter Doug Fister would move to the bullpen, in recognition of the rookie's strong performance since his promotion. Ross' promotion lasted barely a month before Williams said on September 8 that reliever Tanner Roark would take over his spot in the rotation and Ross would move to the bullpen in an effort to keep him from exceeding an undisclosed "innings limit" for the season.

Although Ross started the 2016 season in the Nationals' rotation, he lost much of the season due to right shoulder inflammation. He was placed on the disabled list on July 3, 2016, and was activated again on September 18. Upon returning from the disabled list, Ross struggled to pitch deep into games, more than once forming a tandem with rookie right-hander Reynaldo López to pitch the first few innings of a game before López took over in long relief. Ross started Game 4 of the 2016 NLDS with the Nats up 2–1 in the series, giving up four runs on 55 pitches over 2 2/3 innings.

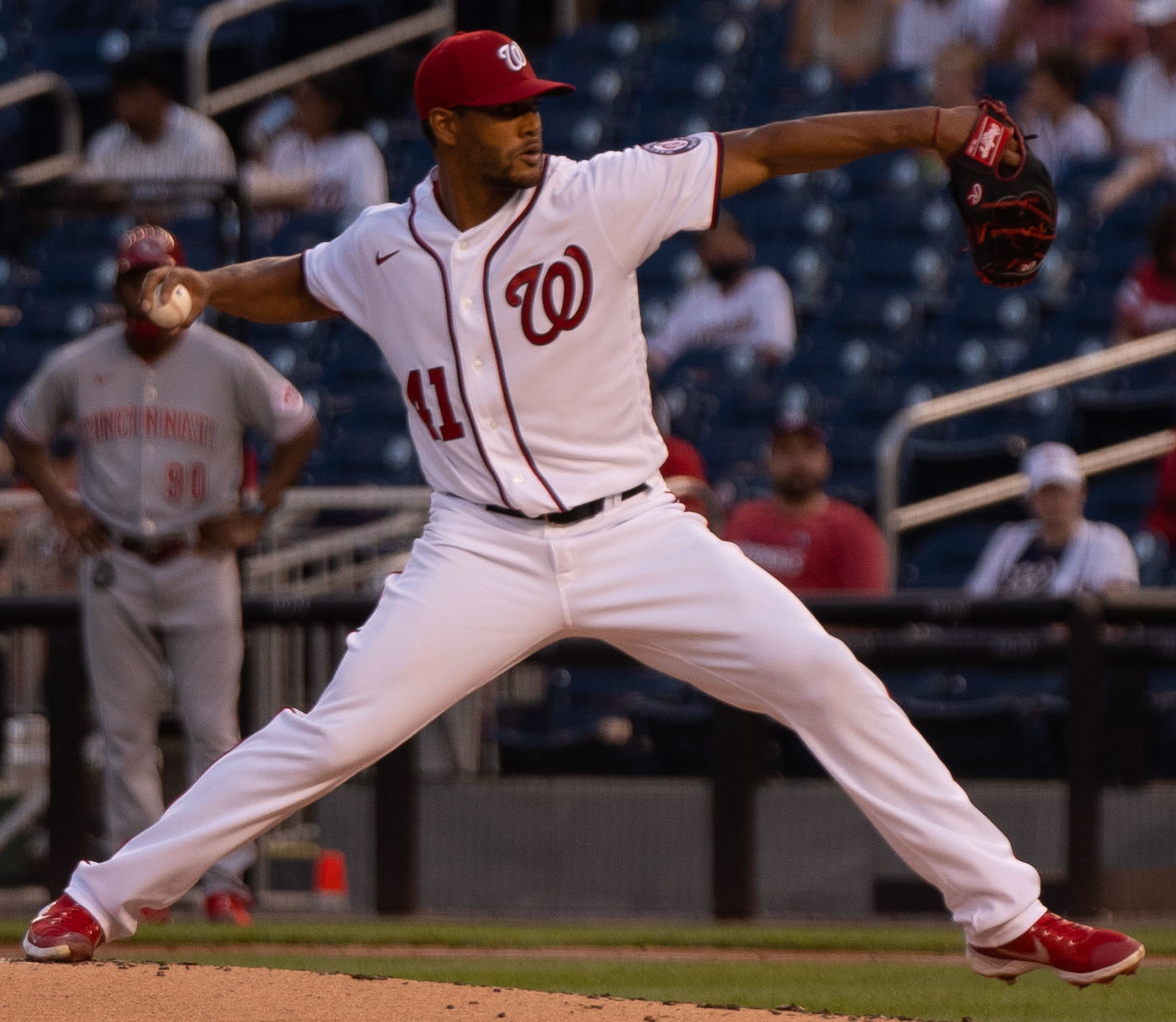
Ross in May 2021

Ross was an up-and-down contributor for the Nationals in the first half of the 2017 season. He started the year pitching for the Triple-A Syracuse Chiefs, but after Nationals starter Jeremy Guthrie was shelled for 10 earned runs in less than an inning in what would be his only appearance of the season, Ross was called up. Upon struggling in the early going, he was optioned back to Syracuse on May 1 in favor of Jacob Turner. Ross returned to the major league rotation on May 23, pitching well against the Seattle Mariners. Through the first half of the season, Ross received more run support than any other pitcher in the major leagues, with the Nationals averaging more than 10 runs in games Ross started. Out of 13 starts by Ross at the major league level in 2017, the Nationals scored at least 10 runs in eight of them. However, in the last of these starts, against the Atlanta Braves on July 9, Ross exited in the fourth inning as the velocity of his fastball dipped so low into the mid-80s that the stadium radar gun was registering them as changeups. On July 15, 2017, medical tests confirmed that his elbow was diagnosed with a torn ulnar collateral ligament. It was further announced that he would undergo ulnar collateral ligament reconstruction ("Tommy John") surgery, ruling him out for the remainder of the season and at least part of the 2018 season. In 2017 he was 5–3 with a 5.01 ERA.

After recovering from his surgery, Ross attempted to make his first MLB start in 14 months on September 7, 2018, facing the Chicago Cubs on a rainy evening at Nationals Park. The game began after a 1-hour 21-minute delay, but the teams played for only 23 minutes before the game was stopped again with two outs in the top of the second inning and the score tied 0–0. Another 2-hour 54-minute delay ensued before the game was postponed. In his 1 2/3-inning outing, Ross threw 24 pitches, gave up one single and hit one batter, but retired the other five Cubs he faced, and his fastball was clocked consistently at 95–96 mph, occasionally reaching 97 mph, which was better than his pre-surgery velocity. In 2018 in three games he was 0–2 with a 5.06 ERA.

In 2019 he was 4–4 with a 5.48 ERA. Ross started game 5 of the 2019 World Series for the Nationals in place of Max Scherzer, who was dealing with a back injury. He allowed 4 runs in 5 innings and was credited with the loss as the Astros won 7–1. Ross received a World Series ring for his efforts after the Nationals defeated the Astros in 7 games.

On June 29, 2020, Ross announced he would not play in the shortened 2020 season during the COVID-19 pandemic.

On August 17, 2021, Ross was placed on the injured list after suffering a partial tear of his ulnar collateral ligament in his right elbow. On May 31, 2022, it was announced that Ross would require Tommy John surgery, ending his season.

=== San Francisco Giants ===
On January 30, 2023, Ross signed a minor league contract with the San Francisco Giants organization. He played in 8 games split between the rookie–level Arizona Complex League Giants, Single–A San Jose Giants, and Triple–A Sacramento River Cats, accumulating a 5.14 ERA with 10 strikeouts across 14 innings pitched. Ross elected free agency following the season on November 6.

=== Milwaukee Brewers (2024) ===
On December 12, 2023, Ross signed a one-year deal with the Milwaukee Brewers. He began the season pitching out of Milwaukee's rotation, and compiled a 2–4 record and 4.50 ERA with 35 strikeouts across 9 starts. Ross was placed on the injured list with a low back strain on May 21, 2024, and transferred to the 60–day injured list on June 26. He was activated on July 30.

=== Philadelphia Phillies ===
On December 23, 2024, Ross signed a one–year, $4 million contract with the Philadelphia Phillies. He made 37 appearances (one start) for Philadelphia during the 2025 campaign, compiling a 2–1 record and 5.12 ERA with 39 strikeouts over 51 innings of work. Ross was released by the Phillies on August 26, 2025.

=== Chicago Cubs ===
On September 1, 2025, Ross signed a minor league contract with the Chicago Cubs organization. He made five appearances for the Triple-A Iowa Cubs, recording a 2.57 ERA with three strikeouts over seven innings of work. Ross elected free agency following the season on November 6.

=== Arizona Diamondbacks ===
On February 14, 2026, Ross signed a minor league contract with the Arizona Diamondbacks. On March 25, the Diamondbacks selected Ross' contract after he made the team's Opening Day roster. He made three appearances for Arizona, but struggled to a 19.64 ERA with two strikeouts across 3 2/3 innings pitched. On April 3, Ross was designated for assignment by the Diamondbacks. He elected free agency after clearing waivers on April 5. On April 8, Ross re-signed with the Diamondbacks organization on a minor league contract. He made 12 appearances for the Triple-A Reno Aces, posting an 0–1 record and 4.29 ERA with 12 strikeouts over 21 innings of work. On May 18, Ross was released by Arizona.

=== Texas Rangers ===
On May 22, 2026, Ross signed a minor league contract with the Texas Rangers organization. He was assigned to the Triple-A Round Rock Express, recording a 2.92 ERA with eight strikeouts across 12 1/3 innings pitched. On June 13, the Rangers selected Ross' contract, adding him to their active roster. In five appearances for Texas, he logged an 0–1 record and 4.50 ERA with five strikeouts over eight innings of work. On June 29, Ross was designated for assignment by the Rangers. He elected free agency after clearing waivers on July 1. On July 3, Ross re-signed with the Rangers on a minor league contract. He elected free agency on November 2.

== Personal life ==
Ross has an older brother, Tyson Ross, who pitched in MLB from 2010 to 2019. His father is a pediatrician and his mother an emergency room nurse in Oakland. His sister, Frankie, is a pediatrician and played soccer at Portland State University. Ross is of Korean descent by way of his maternal grandmother.
