= 2015 Washington Nationals season =

2015 Washington Nationals
- League: National League
- Division: East
- Ballpark: Nationals Park
- City: Washington, D.C.
- Record: 83–79 (.512)
- Divisional place: 2nd
- Owners: Lerner Enterprises
- General managers: Mike Rizzo
- Managers: Matt Williams
- Television: MASN; WUSA (CBS affiliate) (Bob Carpenter, FP Santangelo, Johnny Holliday, Ray Knight, Dan Kolko)
- Radio: WJFK 106.7 FM; Washington Nationals Radio Network (Charlie Slowes, Dave Jageler)

The 2015 Washington Nationals season was the Nationals' 11th season as the baseball franchise of Major League Baseball in the District of Columbia, the eighth season at Nationals Park, and the 47th since the original team was started in Montreal, Quebec, Canada. The team finished second in the National League East with a record of 83–79. Manager Matt Williams and the entire coaching staff were dismissed after the season.

== Offseason ==
=== Transactions ===
On December 12, 2014, the Nationals traded Ross Detwiler to the Texas Rangers for Abel De Los Santos and minor-leaguer Chris Bostick.

On December 19, 2014, the Nationals took part in a three-team trade. Washington sent Travis Ott and Steven Souza Jr., to the Tampa Bay Rays, the Rays sent Ryan Hanigan, Wil Myers, and minor-leaguers Jose Castillo and Gerardo Reyes to the San Diego Padres, and the Padres sent René Rivera, Burch Smith, and minor-leaguer Jake Bauers to the Rays. The Padres sent Joe Ross and a player to be named later to the Nationals, and completed the trade on June 14, 2015, by sending Trea Turner to the Nationals.

On January 14, 2015, the Nationals traded Tyler Clippard to the Oakland Athletics for Yunel Escobar and traded minor-leaguer Daniel Rosenbaum to the Boston Red Sox for Dan Butler.

On January 22, 2015, the Nationals signed right-handed reliever Evan Meek and utility man Kila Ka'aihue to minor-league deals with invitations to spring training.

On March 30, 2015, they traded Jerry Blevins to the New York Mets for Matt den Dekker and traded Sandy León to the Boston Red Sox for cash considerations.

=== Spring training ===
The Nationals held their 2015 spring training in Viera, Florida, with home games played at Space Coast Stadium. A number of players went down with injuries during spring workouts and play, including starting pitcher Stephen Strasburg, infielders Yunel Escobar and Anthony Rendon, left fielder Jayson Werth, center fielder Denard Span, and closer Drew Storen.

=== Team news ===
The Nationals lost first baseman Adam LaRoche, second baseman Asdrúbal Cabrera, relievers Ryan Mattheus, Ross Ohlendorf, and Rafael Soriano, infielder Greg Dobbs, outfielder Nate Schierholtz, and utility man Scott Hairston to free agency after the 2014 season. The Washington Post noted that despite some high-profile departures, particularly the loss of LaRoche, the team's core remained largely intact through 2015.

The Nationals made several key roster decisions with its returning players during the off-season. Most notably, Ryan Zimmerman was moved from third to first base, Jayson Werth and Bryce Harper swapped positions in the outfield to put Werth in left and Harper in right field, and Tanner Roark was moved out of the rotation to the bullpen.

Catcher Wilson Ramos did not participate in the Venezuelan Professional Baseball League over the winter, as he had done in the past. He said he wanted to rest his body after a grueling 2014 season.

Infielder Kevin Frandsen was released on April 1, days before the start of the regular season.

== Regular season ==
=== Opening Day ===
The Nationals opened their season on April 6 at Nationals Park against the New York Mets. As multiple starters were still recovering from offseason surgeries or injuries sustained during Spring training, the Nationals were forced to get creative with their lineup in order to fill the holes: Michael A. Taylor stood in for the recovering Denard Span in center field, and Tyler Moore was placed in left field while Jayson Werth was still rehabilitating an injured shoulder. Yunel Escobar, originally slated to play at second base, was bumped to third as Anthony Rendon continued nursing an MCL sprain. The sudden vacancy at second was filled by the veteran Dan Uggla, who had impressed the coaching staff during Spring training.

The Nationals were mostly quiet on offense throughout the game except for Harper, who went 2-for-4 on the day. Harper opened up the score by smashing a solo home run over the right-field wall in the fourth inning, giving his team a 1–0 lead. but a pair of errors by the shortstop Ian Desmond in the sixth and seventh innings allowed the Mets to score three runs, causing the Nationals to lose the game 3–1. The Mets' starting pitcher Bartolo Colón was credited with the win, and reliever Buddy Carlyle notched the first save in his career. Nationals starting pitcher Max Scherzer was credited with the loss, despite having an ERA of 0.00 as all three Mets runs came indirectly from Desmond's two errors.

==== Opening Day lineup ====
Opening Day Starters
| Name | Position |
|---|---|
| Michael A. Taylor | Center fielder |
| Yunel Escobar | Third baseman |
| Bryce Harper | Right fielder |
| Ryan Zimmerman | First baseman |
| Wilson Ramos | Catcher |
| Ian Desmond | Shortstop |
| Dan Uggla | Second baseman |
| Tyler Moore | Left fielder |
| Max Scherzer | Starting pitcher |

=== Season standings ===
==== National League East ====
NL East
| Team | W | L | Pct. | GB | Home | Road |
|---|---|---|---|---|---|---|
| New York Mets | 90 | 72 | .556 | — | 49‍–‍32 | 41‍–‍40 |
| Washington Nationals | 83 | 79 | .512 | 7 | 46‍–‍35 | 37‍–‍44 |
| Miami Marlins | 71 | 91 | .438 | 19 | 41‍–‍40 | 30‍–‍51 |
| Atlanta Braves | 67 | 95 | .414 | 23 | 42‍–‍39 | 25‍–‍56 |
| Philadelphia Phillies | 63 | 99 | .389 | 27 | 37‍–‍44 | 26‍–‍55 |

==== National League Wild Card ====
Division leaders
| Team | W | L | Pct. |
|---|---|---|---|
| St. Louis Cardinals | 100 | 62 | .617 |
| Los Angeles Dodgers | 92 | 70 | .568 |
| New York Mets | 90 | 72 | .556 |

Wild Card teams (Top 2 teams qualify for postseason)
| Team | W | L | Pct. | GB |
|---|---|---|---|---|
| Pittsburgh Pirates | 98 | 64 | .605 | +1 |
| Chicago Cubs | 97 | 65 | .599 | — |
| San Francisco Giants | 84 | 78 | .519 | 13 |
| Washington Nationals | 83 | 79 | .512 | 14 |
| Arizona Diamondbacks | 79 | 83 | .488 | 18 |
| San Diego Padres | 74 | 88 | .457 | 23 |
| Miami Marlins | 71 | 91 | .438 | 26 |
| Milwaukee Brewers | 68 | 94 | .420 | 29 |
| Colorado Rockies | 68 | 94 | .420 | 29 |
| Atlanta Braves | 67 | 95 | .414 | 30 |
| Cincinnati Reds | 64 | 98 | .395 | 33 |
| Philadelphia Phillies | 63 | 99 | .389 | 34 |

=== Record vs. opponents ===
2015 National League record Source: MLB Standings Grid – 2015
| Team | AZ | ATL | CHC | CIN | COL | LAD | MIA | MIL | NYM | PHI | PIT | SD | SF | STL | WSH | AL |
|---|---|---|---|---|---|---|---|---|---|---|---|---|---|---|---|---|
| Arizona | — | 3–3 | 2–4 | 6–1 | 13–6 | 6–13 | 5–2 | 5–2 | 2–5 | 2–4 | 1–5 | 9–10 | 11–8 | 0–7 | 3–4 | 11–9 |
| Atlanta | 3–3 | — | 1–6 | 3–4 | 1–6 | 3–3 | 10–9 | 5–2 | 8–11 | 11–8 | 2–4 | 2–5 | 3–4 | 4–2 | 5–14 | 6–14 |
| Chicago | 4–2 | 6–1 | — | 13–6 | 4–2 | 3–4 | 3–3 | 14–5 | 7–0 | 2–5 | 11–8 | 3–3 | 5–2 | 8–11 | 4–3 | 10–10 |
| Cincinnati | 1–6 | 4–3 | 6–13 | — | 2–4 | 1–6 | 3–4 | 9–10 | 0–7 | 4–2 | 11–8 | 2–4 | 2–5 | 7–12 | 5–1 | 7–13 |
| Colorado | 6–13 | 6–1 | 2–4 | 4–2 | — | 8–11 | 2–5 | 5–1 | 0–7 | 5–2 | 1–6 | 7–12 | 11–8 | 3–4 | 3–3 | 5–15 |
| Los Angeles | 13–6 | 3–3 | 4–3 | 6–1 | 11–8 | — | 4–2 | 4–3 | 3–4 | 5–2 | 1–5 | 14–5 | 8–11 | 2–5 | 4–2 | 10–10 |
| Miami | 2–5 | 9–10 | 3–3 | 4–3 | 5–2 | 2–4 | — | 4–2 | 8–11 | 9–10 | 1–6 | 2–5 | 5–2 | 1–5 | 9–10 | 7–13 |
| Milwaukee | 2–5 | 2–5 | 5–14 | 10–9 | 1–5 | 3–4 | 2–4 | — | 3–3 | 7–0 | 10–9 | 5–2 | 1–5 | 6–13 | 3–4 | 8–12 |
| New York | 5–2 | 11–8 | 0–7 | 7–0 | 7–0 | 4–3 | 11–8 | 3–3 | — | 14–5 | 0–6 | 2–4 | 3–3 | 3–4 | 11–8 | 9–11 |
| Philadelphia | 4–2 | 8–11 | 5–2 | 2–4 | 2–5 | 2–5 | 10–9 | 0–7 | 5–14 | — | 2–5 | 5–1 | 1–5 | 2–5 | 7–12 | 8–12 |
| Pittsburgh | 5–1 | 4–2 | 8–11 | 8–11 | 6–1 | 5–1 | 6–1 | 9–10 | 6–0 | 5–2 | — | 5–2 | 6–1 | 9–10 | 3–4 | 13–7 |
| San Diego | 10–9 | 5–2 | 3–3 | 4–2 | 12–7 | 5–14 | 5–2 | 2–5 | 4–2 | 1–5 | 2–5 | — | 8–11 | 4–3 | 2–5 | 7–13 |
| San Francisco | 8–11 | 4–3 | 2–5 | 5–2 | 8–11 | 11–8 | 2–5 | 5–1 | 3–3 | 5–1 | 1–6 | 11–8 | — | 2–4 | 4–3 | 13–7 |
| St. Louis | 7–0 | 2–4 | 11–8 | 12–7 | 4–3 | 5–2 | 5–1 | 13–6 | 4–3 | 5–2 | 10–9 | 3–4 | 4–2 | — | 4–2 | 11–9 |
| Washington | 4–3 | 14–5 | 3–4 | 1–5 | 3–3 | 2–4 | 10–9 | 4–3 | 8–11 | 12–7 | 4–3 | 5–2 | 3–4 | 2–4 | — | 8–12 |

=== April ===
The Nationals struggled to stay afloat in their first month of the season. The team lost on Opening Day to the New York Mets, with Max Scherzer getting his first regular-season start as a Washington National and taking the loss despite pitching well, with shortstop Ian Desmond and second baseman Dan Uggla contributing to the defeat with defensive miscues in the middle infield. The Nationals managed to bounce back from the poor result with a win over the Mets in the second game of the series, earning Jordan Zimmermann his first win and Drew Storen his first save of the year. However, with its normal top three men in the lineup still not ready due to a spate of injuries, the offense struggled to score runs as the team lost the opening series at home to the Mets, with New York ace Matt Harvey outdueling Stephen Strasburg in Harvey's return after Tommy John surgery. The Nationals had similar results in the following series against the Philadelphia Phillies and the Boston Red Sox. Even when they scored multiple runs, poor fielding would often sabotage the team's chances of victory. The Nationals ended the month with a league-worst 24 recorded errors, nine of them attributed solely to Desmond.

Outfielders Jayson Werth and Denard Span eventually finished their minor-league injury rehab assignments and rejoined the team, with Werth coming up on April 13 and Span returning on April 19. However, more players would go on the disabled list over the course of the month. Right-handed relief pitcher Craig Stammen tore a flexor tendon in his pitching arm and needed surgery to repair it, abruptly ending his 2015 campaign just a couple weeks into the season. Left-hander Felipe Rivero, called up to add depth to the bullpen, only made one appearance in a loss to the Phillies before going on the disabled list with gastrointestinal bleeding. Reed Johnson, signed late in spring training to provide bench depth, was hurt late in the month, straining his calf while avoiding a pickoff throw to first base. Meanwhile, Casey Janssen, Nate McLouth, and Anthony Rendon all stayed on the disabled list throughout the month, with changing timetables for their return. The Nationals also traded away left-handed reliever Xavier Cedeño after a string of poor performances out of the bullpen.

The Nationals appeared to hit their lowest point as they suffered a six-game losing streak, starting from an April 22 loss to the St. Louis Cardinals and slumping into last place in the National League East division. On April 28, pitching prospect A. J. Cole made an unexpected major-league debut against the Atlanta Braves after Scherzer injured his thumb. Cole was chased off the mound after two innings, allowing nine runs off nine hits and one walk, with one strikeout. Despite being down 9–1 after two innings, the team fought back and won the game 13–12, capped by a go-ahead three-run homer by Uggla, a former Brave, in the ninth inning. The effort broke the Nationals' previous record comeback from June 17, 2006, when the team came back from a 9–2 deficit to beat the Yankees 11–9.

The Nationals also set another record the very next game, posting back-to-back 13-run games after repeating their offensive performance and demolishing the Braves 13–4 in the rubber match of the series. However, Johnson suffered a leg injury during the game and ended up being placed on the disabled list for most of the season.

=== May ===
The Nationals rebounded from a discouraging April to win eight of the nine series they played in May. Many of these games would be won by small run margins, which led Drew Storen to a league-leading 16 saves by the end of the month. At one point, the team had so many consecutive save opportunities that manager Matt Williams opted to rest Storen and gave starter-turned-reliever Tanner Roark his first career save on May 4 against the Miami Marlins. Rookie A. J. Cole later notched his own first save during a 10–0 blowout of the San Diego Padres on May 15, having pitched three straight innings in relief, during a brief call-up due to a forearm injury to starting pitcher Doug Fister that placed Fister on the disabled list.

Other rookies notched their own notable firsts throughout this month: left-handed pitchers Matt Grace and Sammy Solis acquired their first major-league wins on May 4 and May 10, respectively. Utility player Clint Robinson, a 30-year-old rookie, became the first Nationals position player ever to pitch in a regular-season game, making his Major League Baseball pitching debut in a May 12 loss to the Arizona Diamondbacks and tossing a scoreless inning in relief, including a three-pitch strikeout of veteran infielder Aaron Hill. Rookie outfielder Michael Taylor, who subbed in for an ejected Bryce Harper in a May 13 matchup against the Diamondbacks, hit his first career grand slam off Addison Reed in the top of the ninth inning to win the game for his team. Wilmer Difo, an infielder who started the year at the team's High-A affiliate Potomac Nationals, was called up on May 19 and hit a single up the middle against the New York Yankees on his first-ever major-league at-bat.

For a large part of the month, Harper led the National League in nearly every offensive category, including batting average, home runs, runs batted in, and wins above replacement. Harper was awarded as "NL Player of the Week" two weeks in a row. However, he was also ejected twice during the month for arguing with the home plate umpire, once on May 13 in Arizona and again on May 20 as Nationals Park hosted the Yankees. The second ejection, by veteran umpire Marvin Hudson, faced criticism from The Washington Post and the Nationals, with Williams saying after the game, "I can't explain it. I don't believe there's anything that warrants throwing him out of the game right there."

Unfortunately for the team, the injury bug kept eating its way through the starting lineup: Fister was diagnosed with a flexor strain after a losing performance against the San Diego Padres on May 14, forcing Roark to start in his place while he recovered and prompting the Nationals to call up Cole. After being hit by a pitch by Padres starter Odrisamer Despaigne on May 15, veteran outfielder Jayson Werth was discovered to have two fractures in his wrist, keeping him sidelined until August at the earliest. Stephen Strasburg pitched poorly in several games and was often pulled out early, until the team finally placed him on the disabled list following a short start against the Cincinnati Reds on May 29 due to neck tightness. Meanwhile, infielder Anthony Rendon's rehab hit a snag after he strained an oblique while rehabbing from an earlier MCL sprain, pushing his own return to June.

All the injuries came to a head in the series against the Reds to close out the month. The offense struggled to score runs, and when the team did lead the bullpen struggled to keep their opponents in check. The Nationals were swept for the first and only time in May. In addition, Harper was hit by a pitch in the back on May 29 and sat out the middle game to recover. The Nationals' only left-handed starting pitcher, Gio González, was hit by pitches twice at the plate in the May 30 game, including once in his throwing arm, which led to him getting pulled earlier than planned after surrendering two runs when he next took the mound. Center fielder Denard Span hurt his knee making a play in the outfield in the last game on May 31, putting him on a day-to-day injury watch as well. Grace made a disastrous relief appearance in the last game of the Reds series, surrendering four earned runs while failing to retire any of the five batters he faced before he was pulled.

Though they were now leading the NL East, the Nationals ended the month only a half-game above the Mets.

=== June ===
Rookie left-handed reliever Felipe Rivero was reactivated from the disabled list on June 1, replacing Matt Grace on the bullpen roster. However, injuries continued to take their toll on the Nationals. Anthony Rendon finally returned to play second base on June 5, but he went back on the disabled list on June 26 with a quadriceps strain. Slugger Ryan Zimmerman, the Nationals' regular first baseman, was placed on the disabled list on June 11 after attempting to play through plantar fasciitis in his left foot with poor results for the first two months of the season. With Doug Fister and Stephen Strasburg still dealing with nagging injuries, the Nationals called up Joe Ross, a right-handed pitcher, from the Double-A Harrisburg Senators to temporarily join the rotation. He made his first start against the Chicago Cubs on June 6, pitching well but taking the loss due to lack of run support. Ross notched his first major league win on June 13, besting Jimmy Nelson and the Milwaukee Brewers at Miller Park in a 7–2 game. The Nationals also acquired David Carpenter as a relief pitcher from the New York Yankees on June 11.

The Nationals did enjoy spectacular pitching performances during June, especially from ace Max Scherzer. In a 4–0 victory over the Brewers at Miller Park on June 14, Scherzer pitched a complete-game one-hitter in which he had 16 strikeouts, a new personal best that also set a new Nationals single-game strikeout record, exceeding the previous team record of 14 strikeouts Strasburg set in his Major League Baseball debut on June 8, 2010. Scherzer retired the first 18 Brewers he faced—also a Nationals record—and only two Brewers reached base, via a single and a walk. Only three balls left the infield, and Scherzer had 27 swings-and-misses among his 119 pitches, another personal best and the most by any Major League Baseball pitcher during the 2015 season up to that time. Eight of his strikeouts came on four or fewer pitches. It was Scherzer's second career shutout and only the third time that a Nationals pitcher had pitched a one-hit shutout, the previous two having been by Gio González and Jordan Zimmermann in 2013. Scherzer also became only the third Major League Baseball pitcher in history to pitch a one-hit shutout with 16 or more strikeouts and one walk or less, joining Nolan Ryan and Kerry Wood.

On June 16, the Nationals had 23 hits in a 16–4 win over the Tampa Bay Rays at Tropicana Field, setting a record for the most hits by the team in a single game since the franchise moved to Washington for the 2005 season. Late in the game, the rookie Ross pinch-hit for designated hitter Yunel Escobar, the first time a pitcher had pinch-hit for a designated hitter in a Major League Baseball game since 1992.

On June 18, Yunel Escobar went 5-for-5 at the plate in a game against the Rays at Nationals Park, the third 5-for-5 game of his career. It also was his third 5-for-5 game in the 2015 season, making him the first player in the history of the Montreal-Washington franchise to have three 5-for-5 games in a season and only the 20th Major League Baseball player to do so since 1914.

In his first start since his one-hit shutout in Milwaukee, Scherzer pitched the second no-hitter in Nationals history—as well as the sixth in the history of the franchise since it began play in Montreal in 1969 (Note: The other no-hitters in Montreal–Washington franchise history were by Bill Stoneman against the Philadelphia Phillies on April 17, 1969 for Montreal, by Stoneman against the New York Mets on October 2, 1972 for Montreal, by Charlie Lea against the San Francisco Giants on May 10, 1981 for Montreal, by Dennis Martínez on July 28, 1991 in a perfect game against the Los Angeles Dodgers for Montreal, and by Jordan Zimmermann against the Miami Marlins on September 28, 2014 for Washington. (See Svrluga, Barry, "Masterpieces", The Washington Post, September 29, 2014, Page D9.)) and the fourth in history for a Washington, D.C., Major League Baseball team (Note: The only other no-hitters for a Washington, D.C., major-league baseball team were by Walter Johnson for the original Washington Senators against the Boston Red Sox on July 1, 1920, by Bobby Burke of the original Washington Senators against the Boston Red Sox in a game at Griffith Stadium on August 8, 1931, and by Jordan Zimmermann of the Washington Nationals against the Miami Marlins on September 28, 2014. (See Svrluga, Barry, "Masterpieces", The Washington Post, September 29, 2014, Page D9.))—on June 20, 2015, shutting down the Pittsburgh Pirates in a 6–0 win at Nationals Park. Scherzer's perfect game bid was denied by José Tábata, whom he hit with a pitch on a two-ball, two-strike count with two outs in the ninth inning to become the only Pirates base runner of the game. Tábata faced some criticism after the game by fans and analysts who believed he leaned into the pitch, although Scherzer said he did not blame Tábata for breaking up the perfect game. Scherzer had 10 strikeouts in the game and, although it was only the third complete game of his career, it was his second complete game in a row. In the two games, in which he had a combined 26 strikeouts, his opponents had gone 1-for-55 against him, making him the first Major League Baseball player to allow one hit or fewer in consecutive complete games since Jim Tobin of the Boston Braves in 1944.

In a 9–2 victory over Pittsburgh at Nationals Park on June 21, the Nationals scored nine runs in the first inning. It set a new Nationals record for runs scored in the first inning and tied the Nationals record for runs scored in any inning. The Pirates did not score until the ninth inning, ending a 24-inning streak of scoreless innings pitched by Nationals pitchers Joe Ross, David Carpenter, Drew Storen, Max Scherzer, Gio González, and Matt Thornton during the three games against Pittsburgh, a new Nationals record for consecutive scoreless innings pitched.

In the seventh inning of a 5–2 win over the Philadelphia Phillies at Citizens Bank Park in Philadelphia, on June 26, the Phillies scored a run off Nationals starting pitcher Max Scherzer, ending a streak of 48 consecutive scoreless innings posted by Nationals starting pitchers Ross, Gonzalez, Strasburg, Zimmermann, Fister, and Scherzer that began in the third inning of a 4–1 win over the Pittsburgh Pirates at Nationals Park on June 19. It was the longest streak of consecutive scoreless innings by starting pitchers in the history of the Montreal–Washington franchise, and the second-longest by any Major League Baseball team since the beginning of the "expansion era" in 1961. (Note: The only longer scoreless-inning streak by starting pitchers in Major League Baseball since the beginning of the 1961 season was 54 innings set by the Baltimore Orioles in 1974. (See Johnson, Chris, "Max Scherzer dominates Phillies for 100th career win," www.masnsports.com, June 27, 2015, 12:27 a.m. EDT.)) The run given up on June 26 also ended Scherzer's personal scoreless-inning streak of 24 2/3 innings, but he became the first major league pitcher since Doyle Alexander in 1976 to pitch a perfect game through the first six innings in three consecutive starts.

Scherzer was named National League Pitcher of the Month for June 2015, the second consecutive month he had received the award. He became the seventeenth major-league pitcher to receive the honor in two consecutive months and the first since Clayton Kershaw of the Los Angeles Dodgers did it in June and July 2014. The award for May 2015 had made Scherzer the fifth Nationals pitcher (Note: The other four Washington Nationals that had been named National League Pitcher of the Month at the time were Chad Cordero, Stephen Strasburg, Gio González, and Jordan Zimmermann, each of whom had received the award once.) to receive the award, and the award for June 2015 made him the first Nationals pitcher to win it twice, the first Nationals pitcher to win it in two consecutive months, and the first pitcher in Montreal–Washington franchise history to win it in consecutive months since Jeff Fassero received it in June and July 1996 while playing for the Montreal Expos.

=== July ===
Ace Max Scherzer was named to the National League team in the All-Star Game on July 14, but he chose not to skip his start before the exhibition game—a hard-fought win over the Baltimore Orioles on July 12 in which he threw 115 pitches—and did not pitch in it. Star outfielder Bryce Harper did play in the All-Star Game after finishing number one overall in fan votes received, a new record at more than 13.9 million, though he went hitless.

The Nationals' season-long struggle with injuries continued. Center fielder Denard Span was placed on the disabled list effective July 7 after attempting to play through persistent back spasms and skipping a few games to rest. Newly acquired right-handed reliever David Carpenter landed on the disabled list with inflammation in his throwing shoulder on July 12, shortly after returning from paternity leave.

After the All-Star Break, baseball resumed on July 17 with a very odd evening at Nationals Park in the first of three games the Nationals hosted against the Los Angeles Dodgers. At 8:19 p.m. EDT with one out in the bottom of the fourth inning, a bank of lights went out, forcing a 1-hour-22-minute stoppage of play. After the lighting finally was restored, the teams played for nine more minutes before the lights went out for a second time. The second delay lasted 40 minutes, after which play resumed. Twelve minutes later, the lights went out for a third time, and the game was suspended with five innings completed and the Nationals ahead 3–2. It was the first game in the history of Nationals Park that was suspended for any reason other than weather. Although rumors spread that the outage somehow was related to a pair of Taylor Swift concerts held at Nationals Park two days earlier, the Nationals announced the following morning that a faulty circuit breaker appeared to have caused the lighting failure. The game was completed on the afternoon following its suspension, resulting in a 5–3 Washington victory.

On July 18, after the completion of the suspended game, the Nationals and Dodgers also played their previously scheduled game for the date. Dodgers starting pitcher Clayton Kershaw, whom the Nationals had not beaten since the 2010 season, had a dominating three-hit performance in the 4–2 Dodger victory, retiring 17 of the last 18 batters he faced and striking out 14 Nationals over eight scoreless innings. No opposing pitcher had ever struck out that many Nationals in a single game since the team's arrival in Washington for the 2005 season. The Nationals swung and missed 30 times against Kershaw, more swings-and-misses than any major-league pitcher had induced in a single game over the past seven years. The next day saw a pitchers' duel between the Dodgers' Zack Greinke, who had not given up a run in a month and had the best ERA in Major League Baseball, and Max Scherzer, who had not issued a walk in a month and had the second-best ERA. Greinke gave up only three hits in eight innings and struck out 11 Nats to beat Scherzer, who gave up only one run – on a wild pitch – during six innings of work. The Dodgers won the game 5–0, and Greinke extended his scoreless streak to 43 2/3 innings, the longest in Major League Baseball since Orel Hershiser's 59-inning streak, also for the Dodgers, in 1988.

Star infielder Anthony Rendon returned from the disabled list on July 25 after missing 25 games with a quadriceps strain. He was joined on July 28 by outfielder Jayson Werth and first baseman Ryan Zimmerman, who missed 61 and 49 games respectively in lengthy disabled list stints.

Expecting a big boost from the return of their previously injured players, the Nationals were less active than their main division rivals, the Mets, at the trade deadline. However, they made a major move by trading with another division rival team, the Philadelphia Phillies, for closer Jonathan Papelbon in exchange for minor league starting pitcher Nick Pivetta. As a result of the trade, closer Drew Storen was tasked with the setup role after Papelbon was given assurances by the Nationals that he would handle save situations.

=== August ===
The Nationals continued to lose ground to the New York Mets, who swept them in a series at Citi Field in Queens and then retook sole possession of the division lead on August 4.

The slumping Nationals also made changes to their rotation in early August. On August 6, after rookie right-hander Joe Ross led the Nationals to a win over the Arizona Diamondbacks, manager Matt Williams announced Ross would remain in the rotation going forward and starter Doug Fister, who had been struggling all season, would move to the bullpen. Stephen Strasburg also returned, taking the mound for the first time since July 4 after a stint on the disabled list, to pitch seven innings in a 6–1 Nationals victory over the Colorado Rockies at Nationals Park on August 8, giving up only three hits and striking out 12. Although he had only six hits during the entire 2014 season, Strasburg went 3-for-3 at the plate in the August 8 game. His three singles made him the first Nationals player ever to strike out 10 or more opponents and have three hits of his own in the same game.

With two outs in the seventh inning of a 3–2 loss to the Rockies at Coors Field on August 21, Nationals center fielder Michael A. Taylor hit a two-run home run to deep left center field off Rockies starting pitcher Yohan Flande measured at 493 feet (150 meters). It went 10 feet (3.0 meters) farther than any other home run in Major League Baseball during the 2015 season up to that time.

Outfielder Reed Johnson experienced an unusual setback in his recovery, sneezing and ending up with a broken rib. Regular center fielder Denard Span returned from a lengthy stint on the disabled list on August 25, but he played just two games before going back on the disabled list and undergoing season-ending hip surgery. Fellow veteran Ryan Zimmerman, the Nationals' starting first baseman, fared better in his return from the disabled list, batting in 28 runs in August to tie a team record.

By the end of the month, the Nationals were barely above .500 for the season at 66–64 and hung 6.5 games behind the Mets in the division.

=== September ===
The Nationals defeated the Atlanta Braves 15–1 on September 3, setting records for the highest number of runs the Nationals had ever scored in a game at Nationals Park and for the largest margin of victory for the franchise since it moved to Washington for the 2005 season. During the game, center fielder Bryce Harper walked four times in his four plate appearances. He scored four runs and had one RBI without ever swinging at any of the 20 pitches thrown to him, becoming the first Major League Baseball player to do so since at least 1920, when tracking of the RBI statistic began. He saw the second-greatest number of pitches in a game without swinging since 2005, exceeded only by Juan Uribe, who saw 21 pitches in a game without swinging while playing for the San Francisco Giants in 2010. He became the first Major League Baseball player with four or more walks, four or more runs, and at least one RBI in the same game since Derrek Lee in 2002 with the Florida Marlins, only the fourth player in history to record at least four walks and at least four runs scored in a single game with no official at-bats, and the first in history to do so while also recording an RBI. He also had had four walks and four runs in an August 18 game against the Colorado Rockies, and by repeating this performance on September 3 he became the first Major League Baseball player to have four or more walks and four or more runs in two games in the same season since Joe DiMaggio of the New York Yankees in 1950. Only Paul Goldschmidt of the Arizona Diamondbacks, who had three four-walk games during the 2015 season, had more four-walk games than Harper during the year.

After rookie starting pitcher Joe Ross was shelled during a September 6 start against the Braves, manager Matt Williams indicated he would be shut down for the season due to fatigue. He was replaced in the rotation by former starter Tanner Roark and made his first appearance out of Washington's bullpen on September 12.

The Mets swept the Nationals in a close-fought three-game series in Nationals Park, coming from behind to win in each game as the Nationals' bullpen faltered. Williams was booed after a loss to the Mets on September 8 during his postgame press conference. After allowing the eventual game-winning home run to Yoenis Céspedes on September 9, reliever Drew Storen slammed his hand on a clubhouse locker and broke his thumb, bringing an end to his season. First baseman Ryan Zimmerman was also forced to sit out the rest of the season due to injury after straining an oblique muscle in the midst of an 11-game hitting streak with six home runs.

Storen's replacement as closer, newly acquired Jonathan Papelbon, ran into his own problems in September. He blew his first save of the season, one year to the day after his last blown save as a member of the Philadelphia Phillies, in a game against his former team when he allowed a solo home run to Freddy Galvis on September 14. He blew a second consecutive save opportunity on an unearned run on September 18, against the Miami Marlins. Days later, he was ejected from a close game against the Baltimore Orioles on September 23 after throwing two pitches above Orioles slugger Manny Machado's shoulders while Machado was at bat. Harper appeared to criticize his teammate after the game, saying "somebody drilled" Machado for hitting a home run earlier in the game and adding, "It's pretty tired." Papelbon was suspended by Major League Baseball for three games over the incident, but he appealed the suspension and was allowed to continue playing through the appeal. On September 27, Papelbon berated Harper after the slugger popped out during a game against the Philadelphia Phillies, telling him he had not run out hard enough to first base. The two exchanged words in the dugout before Papelbon lunged at Harper and grabbed him by the throat, and the teammates briefly grappled before being separated. Harper left the game without speaking to Williams, who sent Papelbon out to pitch the ninth, in which he gave up five runs and took the loss. Asked why he kept Papelbon in the game even after the fight, Williams explained, "He's our closer." He later said he had been unaware of the extent of the altercation. The next day, the Nationals announced Papelbon would accept the earlier three-game suspension as well as a four-game team suspension, effectively ending his season.

=== October ===
With Drew Storen injured and Jonathan Papelbon suspended, rookie left-hander Felipe Rivero assumed the role of closer for the last week of the season, recording his first career save against the Braves on October 1.

Ace Max Scherzer threw his second no-hitter of the season on October 3, the first since Nolan Ryan in 1973 to pitch multiple no-hitters during the regular season. He struck out 17 Mets during the 2–0 Nationals victory, with nine going down swinging in a row before Curtis Granderson popped up for the final out. Only one opposing batter reached base, on a throwing error by third baseman Yunel Escobar. Scherzer's no-hitter was hailed as one of the greatest pitching performances in Major League Baseball history, coming in with a game score of 104—second only to Kerry Wood's one-hitter in 1998 with a game score of 105, among nine-inning games.

Amid a historic age-22 season, outfielder Bryce Harper was in a close race for the National League batting title (with Dee Gordon), on-base percentage title (with Joey Votto), and home run title (with Nolan Arenado) up until the final day of the season on October 4. The Mets defeated the Nationals 1–0 and Harper fell behind Gordon for the batting title, but he clinched the OBP title over Votto with a double in his final at-bat of the season and finished tied with Arenado at 42 home runs apiece. He went on to win the National League Most Valuable Player Award, the youngest ever ballplayer to receive the honor by a unanimous vote, and the National League Hank Aaron Award, as well as a Silver Slugger Award. Scherzer finished fifth in NL Cy Young Award voting.

Manager Matt Williams and his entire coaching staff were dismissed on October 5, the day after the regular season ended.

=== Notable transactions ===
- April 22, 2015: The Nationals traded Xavier Cedeño to the Los Angeles Dodgers for cash considerations.
- May 5, 2015: The Nationals purchased minor-leaguer Darin Mastroianni from the Philadelphia Phillies.
- June 1, 2015: The Nationals purchased minor-leaguer P. J. Walters from the Los Angeles Dodgers.
- June 11, 2015: The Nationals traded minor-leaguer Tony Renda to the New York Yankees for David Carpenter.
- July 28, 2015: The Nationals traded minor-leaguer Nick Pivetta to the Philadelphia Phillies for Jonathan Papelbon and cash. The Nationals designated Emmanuel Burriss for assignment and outrighted him to the minor leagues.

=== Major league debuts ===
- A. J. Cole (April 28, 2015)
- Abel De Los Santos (July 21, 2015)
- Wilmer Difo (May 19, 2015)
- Matt Grace (April 22, 2015)
- Felipe Rivero (April 17, 2015)
- Joe Ross (June 6, 2015)
- Pedro Severino (September 20, 2015)
- Sammy Solis (April 30, 2015)
- Trea Turner (August 21, 2015)

=== Culture and entertainment ===
In 2015, the Nationals entered a three-year marketing partnership with the White House Historical Association in which the President of the United States honored in the association's annual Christmas ornament each year also would appear that season as a Racing President in the Presidents Race at Nationals Park. In accordance with the agreement, the Nationals announced midway through the 2015 season that a likeness of Calvin Coolidge ("Cal" for short), the 30th President of the United States, would become the sixth Racing President, as well as the first one to enter the race while an MLB season was in progress, joining George Washington ("George"), Thomas Jefferson ("Tom"), Abraham Lincoln ("Abe"), Theodore Roosevelt ("Teddy"), and William Howard Taft ("Bill"). Cal debuted on July 3, 2015, the eve of his 143rd birthday, during a game against the San Francisco Giants, and won his first race. Cal was retired after the season.

=== Attendance ===
The Nationals drew 2,619,843 fans at Nationals Park during 2015, their third-highest attendance since arriving in Washington in 2005. It placed them fifth in attendance for the season among the 15 National League teams, their highest attendance ranking for a single season at the time. Their highest attendance at a home game was on April 6, when they drew 42,295 for a game against the New York Mets on Opening Day, while their lowest was 23,192 for the first game of a doubleheader against the Toronto Blue Jays on June 2. Their average home attendance was 32,344 per game, third-highest since their arrival in Washington.

=== Game log ===
Legend
| | Nationals win |
| | Nationals loss |
| | Postponement |
| | Eliminated from playoff spot |
| **Bold** | Nationals team member |

2015 game log
April (10–13)

| # | Date | Opponent | Score | Win | Loss | Save | Attendance | Record |
|---|---|---|---|---|---|---|---|---|
| 1 | April 6 | Mets | 1–3 | Colón (1–0) | **Scherzer** (0–1) | Carlyle (1) | 42,295 | 0–1 |
| 2 | April 8 | Mets | 2–1 | **Zimmermann** (1–0) | deGrom (0–1) | **Storen** (1) | 25,999 | 1–1 |
| 3 | April 9 | Mets | 3–6 | Harvey (1–0) | **Strasburg** (0–1) | | 25,327 | 1–2 |
| 4 | April 10 | @ Phillies | 1–4 | García (1–0) | **Gonzalez** (0–1) | Papelbon (2) | 19,047 | 1–3 |
| 5 | April 11 | @ Phillies | 2–3 (10) | McGowan (1–0) | **Roark** (0–1) | | 23,740 | 1–4 |
| 6 | April 12 | @ Phillies | 4–3 (10) | **Barrett** (1–0) | Diekman (0–1) | **Storen** (2) | 30,094 | 2–4 |
| 7 | April 13 | @ Red Sox | 4–9 | Porcello (1–1) | **Zimmermann** (1–1) | | 37,203 | 2–5 |
| 8 | April 14 | @ Red Sox | 7–8 | Mujica (1–0) | **Treinen** (0–1) | Uehara (1) | 35,258 | 2–6 |
| 9 | April 15 | @ Red Sox | 10–5 | **Gonzalez** (1–1) | Miley (0–1) | | 33,493 | 3–6 |
| 10 | April 16 | Phillies | 5–2 | **Fister** (1–0) | Hamels (0–2) | **Storen** (3) | 24,768 | 4–6 |
| 11 | April 17 | Phillies | 7–2 | **Scherzer** (1–1) | O'Sullivan (0–1) | | 31,608 | 5–6 |
| 12 | April 18 | Phillies | 3–5 | Harang (2–1) | **Zimmermann** (1–2) | Papelbon (3) | 35,330 | 5–7 |
| 13 | April 19 | Phillies | 4–1 | **Strasburg** (1–1) | Buchanan (0–3) | **Storen** (4) | 36,631 | 6–7 |
| 14 | April 21 | Cardinals | 2–1 (10) | **Barrett** (2–0) | Villanueva (1–1) | | 27,021 | 7–7 |
| 15 | April 22 | Cardinals | 5–7 | Siegrist (1–0) | **Treinen** (0–2) | Rosenthal (5) | 25,771 | 7–8 |
| 16 | April 23 | Cardinals | 1–4 | Wacha (3–0) | **Scherzer** (1–2) | Rosenthal (6) | 26,990 | 7–9 |
| 17 | April 24 | @ Marlins | 2–3 | Morris (2–0) | **Roark** (0–2) | Cishek (1) | 16,259 | 7–10 |
| 18 | April 25 | @ Marlins | 0–8 | Koehler (2–2) | **Strasburg** (1–2) | | 18,129 | 7–11 |
| 19 | April 26 | @ Marlins | 2–6 | Haren (2–1) | **Gonzalez** (1–2) | | 21,433 | 7–12 |
| 20 | April 27 | @ Braves | 4–8 | Stults (1–1) | **Fister** (1–1) | | 16,658 | 7–13 |
| 21 | April 28 | @ Braves | 13–12 | **Treinen** (1–2) | Grilli (0–1) | **Storen** (5) | 14,833 | 8–13 |
| 22 | April 29 | @ Braves | 13–4 | **Zimmermann** (2–2) | Wood (1–1) | | 12,595 | 9–13 |
| 23 | April 30 | @ Mets | 8–2 | **Strasburg** (2–2) | deGrom (2–3) | | 21,689 | 10–13 |

May (18–9)

| # | Date | Opponent | Score | Win | Loss | Save | Attendance | Record |
|---|---|---|---|---|---|---|---|---|
| 24 | May 1 | @ Mets | 0–4 | Harvey (5–0) | **Scherzer** (1–3) | Familia (10) | 33,178 | 10–14 |
| 25 | May 2 | @ Mets | 1–0 | **Gonzalez** (2–2) | Niese (2–2) | **Storen** (6) | 39,730 | 11–14 |
| 26 | May 3 | @ Mets | 1–0 | **Fister** (2–1) | Gee (0–2) | **Storen** (7) | 41,048 | 12–14 |
| 27 | May 4 | Marlins | 6–4 | **Grace** (1–0) | Morris (3–1) | **Roark** (1) | 24,731 | 13–14 |
| 28 | May 5 | Marlins | 1–2 | Latos (1–3) | **Strasburg** (2–3) | Cishek (3) | 25,332 | 13–15 |
| 29 | May 6 | Marlins | 7–5 | **Scherzer** (2–3) | Koehler (2–3) | **Storen** (8) | 31,417 | 14–15 |
| 30 | May 8 | Braves | 9–2 | **Gonzalez** (3–2) | Stults (1–3) | | 31,288 | 15–15 |
| 31 | May 9 | Braves | 8–6 | **Storen** (1–0) | Martin (1–1) | | 39,193 | 16–15 |
| 32 | May 10 | Braves | 5–4 | **Solis** (1–0) | Martin (1–2) | **Storen** (9) | 31,938 | 17–15 |
| 33 | May 11 | @ Diamondbacks | 11–1 | **Scherzer** (3–3) | Collmenter (3–4) | | 16,406 | 18–15 |
| 34 | May 12 | @ Diamondbacks | 6–14 | De La Rosa (4–2) | **Strasburg** (2–4) | | 19,053 | 18–16 |
| 35 | May 13 | @ Diamondbacks | 9–6 | **Barrett** (3–0) | Reed (0–2) | **Storen** (10) | 19,026 | 19–16 |
| 36 | May 14 | @ Padres | 3–8 | Ross (2–3) | **Fister** (2–2) | | 22,710 | 19–17 |
| 37 | May 15 | @ Padres | 10–0 | **Zimmermann** (3–2) | Despaigne (2–2) | **Cole** (1) | 26,166 | 20–17 |
| 38 | May 16 | @ Padres | 4–1 | **Scherzer** (4–3) | Cashner (1–7) | **Storen** (11) | 45,282 | 21–17 |
| 39 | May 17 | @ Padres | 10–5 | **Strasburg** (3–4) | Kennedy (2–3) | | 37,032 | 22–17 |
| 40 | May 19 | Yankees | 8–6 (10) | **Grace** (2–0) | Miller (0–1) | | 37,355 | 23–17 |
| 41 | May 20 | Yankees | 3–2 | **Zimmermann** (4–2) | Warren (2–3) | **Storen** (12) | 37,648 | 24–17 |
| 42 | May 22 | Phillies | 2–1 | **Scherzer** (5–3) | O'Sullivan (1–3) | **Storen** (13) | 35,893 | 25–17 |
| 43 | May 23 | Phillies | 1–8 | Hamels (5–3) | **Strasburg** (3–5) | | 41,722 | 25–18 |
| 44 | May 24 | Phillies | 4–1 | **Gonzalez** (4–2) | Harang (4–4) | **Storen** (14) | 41,044 | 26–18 |
| 45 | May 25 | @ Cubs | 2–1 | **Roark** (1–2) | Grimm (1–1) | **Storen** (15) | 38,463 | 27–18 |
| 46 | May 26 | @ Cubs | 2–3 | Rondon (3–0) | **Grace** (2–1) | | 30,440 | 27–19 |
| 47 | May 27 | @ Cubs | 3–0 | **Scherzer** (6–3) | Lester (4–3) | **Storen** (16) | 34,215 | 28–19 |
| 48 | May 29 | @ Reds | 2–5 | DeSclafani (3–4) | **Jordan** (0–1) | Chapman (8) | 28,877 | 28–20 |
| 49 | May 30 | @ Reds | 5–8 | Hoover (3–0) | **Janssen** (0–1) | Chapman (9) | 36,294 | 28–21 |
| 50 | May 31 | @ Reds | 2–8 | Hoover (4–0) | **Barrett** (3–1) | | 31,874 | 28–22 |

June (15–12)

| # | Date | Opponent | Score | Win | Loss | Save | Attendance | Record |
|---|---|---|---|---|---|---|---|---|
| – | June 1 | Blue Jays | Postponed (rain) Rescheduled for June 2 as part of a doubleheader | | | | | |
| 51 | June 2 (1) | Blue Jays | 2–0 | **Zimmermann** (5–2) | Dickey (2–6) | **Storen** (17) | 23,192 | 29–22 |
| 52 | June 2 (2) | Blue Jays | 3–7 | Estrada (2–3) | **Scherzer** (6–4) | | 25,765 | 29–23 |
| 53 | June 3 | Blue Jays | 0–8 | Buehrle (7–4) | **Jordan** (0–2) | | 25,765 | 29–24 |
| 54 | June 4 | Cubs | 1–2 | Arrieta (5–4) | **Gonzalez** (4–3) | Rondon (10) | 35,465 | 29–25 |
| 55 | June 5 | Cubs | 7–5 | **Roark** (2–2) | Wada (0–1) | **Storen** (18) | 36,124 | 30–25 |
| 56 | June 6 | Cubs | 2–4 | Hammel (5–2) | **Ross** (0–1) | Strop (2) | 38,214 | 30–26 |
| 57 | June 7 | Cubs | 3–6 | Hendricks (2–2) | **Zimmermann** (5–3) | Motte (1) | 40,939 | 30–27 |
| 58 | June 9 | @ Yankees | 1–6 | Tanaka (4–1) | **Scherzer** (6–5) | | 36,613 | 30–28 |
| 59 | June 10 | @ Yankees | 5–4 (11) | **Treinen** (2–2) | Capuano (0–4) | **Storen** (19) | 39,847 | 31–28 |
| 60 | June 11 | @ Brewers | 5–6 | Smith (2–0) | **Barrett** (3–2) | Rodríguez (13) | 26,371 | 31–29 |
| 61 | June 12 | @ Brewers | 4–8 | Fiers (3–6) | **Zimmermann** (5–4) | | 31,815 | 31–30 |
| 62 | June 13 | @ Brewers | 7–2 | **Ross** (1–1) | Nelson (3–7) | | 36,800 | 32–30 |
| 63 | June 14 | @ Brewers | 4–0 | **Scherzer** (7–5) | Jungmann (1–1) | | 34,964 | 33–30 |
| 64 | June 15 | @ Rays | 1–6 | Ramírez (6–2) | **Gonzalez** (4–4) | | 10,216 | 33–31 |
| 65 | June 16 | @ Rays | 16–4 | **Roark** (3–2) | Colomé (3–3) | | 11,491 | 34–31 |
| 66 | June 17 | Rays | 0–5 | Andriese (2–1) | **Zimmermann** (5–5) | | 28,929 | 34–32 |
| 67 | June 18 | Rays | 3–5 | Archer (8–4) | **Fister** (2–3) | Boxberger (16) | 29,242 | 34–33 |
| 68 | June 19 | Pirates | 4–1 | **Ross** (2–1) | Burnett (6–3) | **Storen** (20) | 38,935 | 35–33 |
| 69 | June 20 | Pirates | 6–0 | **Scherzer** (8–5) | Liriano (4–6) | | 41,104 | 36–33 |
| 70 | June 21 | Pirates | 9–2 | **Gonzalez** (5–4) | Morton (5–1) | | 40,015 | 37–33 |
| 71 | June 23 | Braves | 3–1 | **Strasburg** (4–5) | Wood (4–5) | **Storen** (21) | 28,344 | 38–33 |
| 72 | June 24 | Braves | 2–1 (11) | **Rivero** (1–0) | Eveland (0–1) | | 36,141 | 39–33 |
| 73 | June 25 | Braves | 7–0 | **Fister** (3–3) | Wisler (1–1) | | 37,874 | 40–33 |
| 74 | June 26 | @ Phillies | 5–2 | **Scherzer** (9–5) | Harang (4–10) | **Storen** (22) | 22,292 | 41–33 |
| – | June 27 | @ Phillies | Postponed (rain) (Note: The game on June 27, 2015, began but was called off after the completion of the top of the second inning with the score tied at 0-0.) Rescheduled for June 28 as part of a doubleheader | | | | | |
| 75 | June 28 (1) | @ Phillies | 3–2 | **Strasburg** (5–5) | Correia (0–2) | **Storen** (23) | 27,126 (Note: The two games on June 28 were played as a single-admission doubleheader with attendance counted only for the two games combined.) | 42–33 |
| 76 | June 28 (2) | @ Phillies | 5–8 | González (3–2) | **Roark** (3–3) | Papelbon (14) | 27,126 | 42–34 |
| 77 | June 30 | @ Braves | 6–1 | **Zimmermann** (6–5) | Miller (5–4) | | 23,961 | 43–34 |

July (11–13)

| # | Date | Opponent | Score | Win | Loss | Save | Attendance | Record |
|---|---|---|---|---|---|---|---|---|
| 78 | July 1 | @ Braves | 1–4 | Wisler (2–1) | **Fister** (3–4) | Grilli (22) | 19,393 | 43–35 |
| 79 | July 2 | @ Braves | 1–2 | Grilli (3–3) | **Scherzer** (9–6) | | 18,585 | 43–36 |
| 80 | July 3 | Giants | 2–1 | **Gonzalez** (6–4) | Peavy (0–3) | **Storen** (24) | 41,693 | 44–36 |
| 81 | July 4 | Giants | 9–3 | **Roark** (4–3) | Bumgarner (8–5) | | 40,029 | 45–36 |
| 82 | July 5 | Giants | 3–1 | **Zimmermann** (7–5) | Kontos (2–1) | **Storen** (25) | 33,157 | 46–36 |
| 83 | July 6 | Reds | 2–3 | Parra (1–1) | **Janssen** (0–2) | Chapman (17) | 23,673 | 46–37 |
| 84 | July 7 | Reds | 0–5 | Cueto (6–5) | **Scherzer** (9–7) | | 31,898 | 46–38 |
| – | July 8 | Reds | Postponed (rain) Rescheduled for September 28 | | | | | |
| 85 | July 10 | @ Orioles | 2–3 | Britton (1–0) | **Roark** (4–4) | | 46,289 | 46–39 |
| 85 | July 11 | @ Orioles | 7–4 | **Zimmermann** (8–5) | González (7–6) | **Storen** (26) | 44,495 | 47–39 |
| 87 | July 12 | @ Orioles | 3–2 | **Scherzer** (10–7) | Chen (4–5) | **Storen** (27) | 46,247 | 48–39 |
**All–Star Break (July 13–16)**
| – | July 17 | Dodgers | Suspended (light failure) (Note: Three light failures occurred at sold-out Nationals Park during the evening of July 17, the first causing a delay of 1 hour 22 minutes, followed by nine minutes of play before the second failure caused another delay of 40 minutes. When a third failure occurred after another 12 minutes of play, the game was suspended after the completion of five innings with the score Washington 3, Los Angeles 2. Its completion, starting at the top of the sixth inning, was scheduled for July 18, to be followed by the game previously scheduled for July 18. (See Janes, Chelsea, "," washingtonpost.com, July 17, 2015, 11:45 p.m. EDT.)) Completion scheduled for July 18 | | | | | |
| 88 | July 18 (1) (Note: The completion of the game suspended on July 17, resumed at the top of the sixth inning with a score of Washington 3, Los Angeles 2.) | Dodgers | 5–3 | **Janssen** (1–2) | Báez (2–2) | **Storen** (28) | 40,709 (Note: This reflects the attendance on July 17. Tickets for the suspended July 17 game were not honored for its completion on July 18 or for the game originally scheduled for July 18. The July 18 completion of the July 17 game and the regularly scheduled game on July 18 were played as a single-admission event.) | 49–39 |
| 89 | July 18 (2) (Note: This was the originally scheduled game for July 18, played after the completion of the game suspended on July 17.) | Dodgers | 2–4 | Kershaw (7–6) | **Fister** (3–5) | | 41,426 (Note: The July 18 completion of the July 17 game and the regularly scheduled game on July 18 were played as a single-admission event.) | 49–40 |
| 90 | July 19 | Dodgers | 0–5 | Greinke (9–2) | **Scherzer** (10–8) | | 40,293 | 49–41 |
| 91 | July 20 | Mets | 7–2 | **Gonzalez** (7–4) | Harvey (8–7) | | 31,326 | 50–41 |
| 92 | July 21 | Mets | 2–7 | DeGrom (10–6) | **Ross** (2–2) | | 37,721 | 50–42 |
| 93 | July 22 | Mets | 4–3 | **Thornton** (1–0) | Parnell (1–1) | **Storen** (29) | 41,291 | 51–42 |
| 94 | July 23 | @ Pirates | 3–7 | Liriano (6–6) | **Fister** (3–6) | | 37,799 | 51–43 |
| 95 | July 24 | @ Pirates | 5–7 | Worley (4–5) | **Solis** (1–1) | Melancon (31) | 38,371 | 51–44 |
| 96 | July 25 | @ Pirates | 9–3 | **Gonzalez** (8–4) | Burnett (8–4) | | 38,185 | 52–44 |
| 97 | July 26 | @ Pirates | 1–3 | Cole (14–4) | **Ross** (2–3) | Melancon (32) | 37,597 | 52–45 |
| 98 | July 28 | @ Marlins | 1–4 | Fernández (4–0) | **Zimmermann** (8–6) | Ramos (17) | 23,988 | 52–46 |
| 99 | July 29 | @ Marlins | 7–2 | **Fister** (4–6) | Koehler (8–7) | | 19,513 | 53–46 |
| 100 | July 30 | @ Marlins | 1–0 | **Scherzer** (11–8) | Haren (7–7) | **Papelbon** (18) | 30,068 | 54–46 |
| 101 | July 31 | @ Mets | 1–2 (12) | Torres (4–4) | **Rivero** (1–1) | | 36,164 | 54–47 |

August (12–17)

| # | Date | Opponent | Score | Win | Loss | Save | Attendance | Record |
|---|---|---|---|---|---|---|---|---|
| 102 | August 1 | @ Mets | 2–3 | Robles (3–2) | **Thornton** (1–1) | Familia (28) | 42,996 | 54–48 |
| 103 | August 2 | @ Mets | 2–5 | Syndergaard (6–5) | **Zimmermann** (8–7) | Clippard (18) | 35,374 | 54–49 |
| 104 | August 3 | Diamondbacks | 4–6 | Godley (3–0) | **Fister** (4–7) | Ziegler (19) | 30,888 | 54–50 |
| 105 | August 4 | Diamondbacks | 5–4 | **Storen** (2–0) | Hernandez (0–2) | **Papelbon** (19) | 26,112 | 55–50 |
| 106 | August 5 | Diamondbacks | 4–11 | De La Rosa (9–5) | **Barrett** (3–3) | | 37,572 | 55–51 |
| 107 | August 6 | Diamondbacks | 8–3 | **Ross** (3–3) | Hellickson (7–8) | | 32,838 | 56–51 |
| 108 | August 7 | Rockies | 4–5 | Oberg (3–2) | **Storen** (2–1) | Kahnle (1) | 33.622 | 56–52 |
| 109 | August 8 | Rockies | 6–1 | **Strasburg** (6–5) | Butler (3–9) | | 37,115 | 57–52 |
| 110 | August 9 | Rockies | 4–6 | Axford (4–5) | **Storen** (2–2) | Kahnle (2) | 33,157 | 57–53 |
| 111 | August 10 | @ Dodgers | 8–3 | **Gonzalez** (9–4) | Anderson (6–7) | | 45,722 | 58–53 |
| 112 | August 11 | @ Dodgers | 0–5 | Greinke (12–2) | **Ross** (3–4) | | 49,384 | 58–54 |
| 113 | August 12 | @ Dodgers | 0–3 | Kershaw (10–6) | **Zimmermann** (8–8) | Jansen (22) | 44,911 | 58–55 |
| 114 | August 13 | @ Giants | 1–3 | Vogelsong (8–8) | **Strasburg** (6–6) | Casilla (28) | 42,109 | 58–56 |
| 115 | August 14 | @ Giants | 5–8 | Affeldt (2–2) | **Scherzer** (11–9) | | 41,675 | 58–57 |
| 116 | August 15 | @ Giants | 6–12 | Peavy (3–5) | **Gonzalez** (9–5) | | 41,916 | 58–58 |
| 117 | August 16 | @ Giants | 0–5 | Bumgarner (14–6) | **Ross** (3–5) | | 41,904 | 58–59 |
| 118 | August 18 | @ Rockies | 15–6 | **Zimmermann** (9–8) | Miller (1–2) | | 24,320 | 59–59 |
| 119 | August 19 | @ Rockies | 4–1 | **Strasburg** (7–6) | Betancourt (2–4) | **Papelbon** (20) | 24,863 | 60–59 |
| 120 | August 20 | @ Rockies | 2–3 | Flande (3–1) | **Scherzer** (11–10) | Axford (17) | 25,211 | 60–60 |
| 121 | August 21 | Brewers | 3–10 | Nelson (10–9) | **Gonzalez** (9–6) | Lohse (1) | 29,916 | 60–61 |
| 122 | August 22 | Brewers | 6–1 | **Ross** (4–5) | Jungmann (7–5) | | 33,171 | 61–61 |
| 123 | August 23 | Brewers | 9–5 | **Zimmermann** (10–8) | Garza (6–14) | | 28,039 | 62–61 |
| 124 | August 25 | Padres | 8–3 | **Strasburg** (8–6) | Shields (9–6) | | 34,199 | 63–61 |
| 125 | August 26 | Padres | 5–6 | Ross (9–9) | **Gonzalez** (9–7) | Kimbrel (36) | 29,332 | 63–62 |
| 126 | August 27 | Padres | 4–2 | **Ross** (5–5) | Cashner (5–13) | **Papelbon** (21) | 28,908 | 64–62 |
| 127 | August 28 | Marlins | 3–4 | Conley (2–1) | **Scherzer** (11–11) | Ramos (23) | 30,892 | 64–63 |
| 128 | August 29 | Marlins | 5–1 | **Zimmermann** (11–8) | Koehler (8–13) | | 31,519 | 65–63 |
| 129 | August 30 | Marlins | 7–4 | **Fister** (5–7) | Hand (4–4) | **Papelbon** (22) | 34,488 | 66–63 |
| 130 | August 31 | @ Cardinals | 5–8 | Siegrist (6–1) | **Janssen** (1–3) | Rosenthal (42) | 42,081 | 66–64 |

September (14–14)

| # | Date | Opponent | Score | Win | Loss | Save | Attendance | Record |
|---|---|---|---|---|---|---|---|---|
| 131 | September 1 | @ Cardinals | 5–8 | Harris (2–1) | **Janssen** (1–4) | | 42,589 | 66–65 |
| 132 | September 2 | @ Cardinals | 4–3 | **Martin** (1–0) | Broxton (1–4) | **Papelbon** (23) | 41,489 | 67–65 |
| 133 | September 3 | Braves | 15–1 | **Zimmermann** (12–8) | Wisler (5–6) | | 28,677 | 68–65 |
| 134 | September 4 | Braves | 5–2 (10) | **Papelbon** (3–1) | Marksberry (0–3) | | 23,536 | 69–65 |
| 135 | September 5 | Braves | 8–2 | **Gonzalez** (10–7) | Miller (5–13) | | 28,646 | 70–65 |
| 136 | September 6 | Braves | 8–4 | **Rivero** (2–1) | Banuelos (1–4) | | 29,281 | 71–65 |
| 137 | September 7 | Mets | 5–8 | Álvarez (1–0) | **Treinen** (2–3) | Familia (37) | 34,210 | 71–66 |
| 138 | September 8 | Mets | 7–8 | Reed (3–2) | **Papelbon** (3–2) | Familia (38) | 27,507 | 71–67 |
| 139 | September 9 | Mets | 3–5 | deGrom (13–7) | **Strasburg** (8–7) | Familia (39) | 27,530 | 71–68 |
| 140 | September 11 | @ Marlins | 1–2 | Dunn (2–5) | **Janssen** (1–5) | Ramos (26) | 17,167 | 71–69 |
| 141 | September 12 | @ Marlins | 0–2 | Fernández (5–0) | **Roark** (4–5) | Ramos (27) | 20,235 | 71–70 |
| 142 | September 13 | @ Marlins | 5–0 | **Scherzer** (12–11) | Hand (4–6) | | 20,131 | 72–70 |
| 143 | September 14 | @ Phillies | 8–7 (11) | **Papelbon** (4–2) | Garcia (3–5) | **Fister** (1) | 15,402 | 73–70 |
| 144 | September 15 | @ Phillies | 4–0 | **Strasburg** (9–7) | Buchanan (2–9) | | 15,325 | 74–70 |
| 145 | September 16 | @ Phillies | 12–2 | **Gonzalez** (11–7) | Asher (0–4) | | 15,753 | 75–70 |
| 146 | September 17 | Marlins | 4–6 | Cosart (2–4) | **Roark** (4–6) | Ramos (28) | 23,606 | 75–71 |
| 147 | September 18 | Marlins | 5–4 (10) | **Janssen** (2–5) | Ellington (1–1) | | 27,495 | 76–71 |
| 148 | September 19 | Marlins | 5–2 | **Zimmermann** (13–8) | Hand (4–7) | **Papelbon** (24) | 32,768 | 77–71 |
| 149 | September 20 | Marlins | 13–3 | **Strasburg** (10–7) | Nicolino (3–4) | | 28,444 | 78–71 |
| – | September 21 | Orioles | Postponed (rain) Rescheduled for September 24 | | | | | |
| 150 | September 22 | Orioles | 1–4 | Jiménez (12–9) | **Gonzalez** (11–8) | O'Day (4) | 27,338 | 78–72 |
| 151 | September 23 | Orioles | 3–4 | Tillman (10–11) | **Scherzer** (12–12) | O'Day (5) | 27,991 | 78–73 |
| 152 | September 24 | Orioles | 4–5 | Wright (3–5) | **Treinen** (2–4) | O'Day (6) | 28,456 | 78–74 |
| 153 | September 25 | Phillies | 2–8 | Eickhoff (2–3) | **Zimmermann** (13–9) | | 31,019 | 78–75 |
| 154 | September 26 | Phillies | 2–1 (12) | **Thornton** (2–1) | Murray (0–1) | | 32,086 | 79–75 |
| 155 | September 27 | Phillies | 5–12 | Hinojosa (2–0) | **Papelbon** (4–3) | | 28,661 | 79–76 |
| 156 | September 28 | Reds | 5–1 | **Scherzer** (13–12) | Finnegan (4–2) | | 24,420 | 80–76 |
| 157 | September 29 | @ Braves | 1–2 | Wisler (7–8) | **Roark** (4–7) | Vizcaíno (8) | 15,272 | 80–77 |
| 158 | September 30 | @ Braves | 0–2 | Pérez (7–6) | **Zimmermann** (13–10) | Vizcaíno (9) | 13,860 | 80–78 |

October (3–1)

| # | Date | Opponent | Score | Win | Loss | Save | Attendance | Record |
|---|---|---|---|---|---|---|---|---|
| 159 | October 1 | @ Braves | 3–0 | **Strasburg** (11–7) | Weber (0–3) | **Rivero** (1) | 37,790 | 81–78 |
| – | October 2 | @ Mets | Postponed (rain) Rescheduled for October 3 as part of a doubleheader | | | | | |
| 160 | October 3 (1) | @ Mets | 3–1 | **Martin** (2–0) | Reed (3–3) | **Rivero** (2) | 39,465 | 82–78 |
| 161 | October 3 (2) | @ Mets | 2–0 | **Scherzer** (14–12) | Harvey (13–8) | | 41,480 | 83–78 |
| 162 | October 4 | @ Mets | 0–1 | Clippard (5–4) | **Treinen** (2–5) | Familia (43) | 41,631 | 83–79 |

== Roster ==
2015 Washington Nationals
Roster
| Pitchers: 30 Aaron Barrett; 48 David Carpenter; 29 Xavier Cedeño; 69 A. J. Cole; 62 Abel De Los Santos; 33 Doug Fister; 47 Gio González; 60 Matt Grace; 55 Taylor Hill; 44 Casey Janssen; 38 Taylor Jordan; 52 Rafael Martin; 58 Jonathan Papelbon; 57 Tanner Roark; 41 Joe Ross; 31 Max Scherzer; 36 Sammy Solis; 35 Craig Stammen; 22 Drew Storen; 37 Stephen Strasburg; 46 Matt Thornton; 64 Blake Treinen; 73 Felipe Vázquez; 27 Jordan Zimmermann | Catchers: 59 José Lobatón; 40 Wilson Ramos; 23 Pedro Severino; Infielders: 16 Emmanuel Burriss; 20 Ian Desmond; 1 Wilmer Difo; 5 Yunel Escobar; 8 Danny Espinosa; 12 Tyler Moore; 6 Anthony Rendon; 25 Clint Robinson; 7 Trea Turner; 26 Dan Uggla; 11 Ryan Zimmerman | Outfielders: 21 Matt den Dekker; 34 Bryce Harper; 4 Reed Johnson; 2 Denard Span; 3 Michael Taylor; 28 Jayson Werth | Manager: 9 Matt Williams; Coaches: 14 Bob Henley (third base); 53 Randy Knorr (bench); 24 Matt LeCroy (bullpen); 54 Steve McCatty (pitching); 39 Rick Schu (hitting); 32 Tony Tarasco (first base); 49 Mark Weidemaier (defensive positioning) |

== Statistics ==
=== Batting ===
Through October 4, 2015
Note: G = Games played; AB = At bats; R = Runs scored; H = Hits; 2B = Doubles; 3B = Triples; HR = Home runs; RBI = Runs batted in; BB = Base on balls; SO = Strikeouts; AVG = Batting average; SB = Stolen bases

| Player | G | AB | R | H | 2B | 3B | HR | RBI | BB | SO | AVG | SB |
|---|---|---|---|---|---|---|---|---|---|---|---|---|
| Aaron Barrett, P | 40 | 0 | 0 | 0 | 0 | 0 | 0 | 0 | 0 | 0 | – | 0 |
| Emmanuel Burriss, 2B | 5 | 3 | 2 | 2 | 0 | 0 | 0 | 0 | 2 | 0 | .667 | 0 |
| David Carpenter, P | 8 | 0 | 0 | 0 | 0 | 0 | 0 | 0 | 0 | 0 | – | 0 |
| Xavier Cedeño, P | 5 | 0 | 0 | 0 | 0 | 0 | 0 | 0 | 0 | 0 | – | 0 |
| A. J. Cole, P | 3 | 2 | 0 | 0 | 0 | 0 | 0 | 0 | 0 | 0 | .000 | 0 |
| Ian Desmond, SS | 156 | 583 | 69 | 136 | 27 | 2 | 19 | 62 | 45 | 187 | .233 | 13 |
| Abel De Los Santos, P | 2 | 0 | 0 | 0 | 0 | 0 | 0 | 0 | 0 | 0 | – | 0 |
| Matt den Dekker, OF | 55 | 99 | 12 | 25 | 6 | 1 | 5 | 12 | 9 | 20 | .253 | 0 |
| Wilmer Difo, 2B | 15 | 11 | 1 | 2 | 0 | 0 | 0 | 0 | 0 | 2 | .182 | 0 |
| Yunel Escobar, 3B | 139 | 535 | 75 | 168 | 25 | 1 | 9 | 56 | 45 | 70 | .314 | 2 |
| Danny Espinosa, 2B | 118 | 367 | 59 | 88 | 21 | 1 | 13 | 37 | 33 | 106 | .240 | 5 |
| Doug Fister, P | 29 | 31 | 2 | 7 | 1 | 0 | 0 | 0 | 2 | 15 | .226 | 0 |
| Gio González, P | 31 | 43 | 1 | 4 | 1 | 0 | 0 | 2 | 1 | 18 | .093 | 0 |
| Matt Grace, P | 26 | 0 | 0 | 0 | 0 | 0 | 0 | 0 | 0 | 0 | – | 0 |
| Bryce Harper, RF | 153 | 521 | 118 | 172 | 38 | 1 | 42 | 99 | 124 | 131 | .330 | 6 |
| Taylor Hill, P | 6 | 0 | 0 | 0 | 0 | 0 | 0 | 0 | 0 | 0 | – | 0 |
| Casey Janssen, P | 48 | 0 | 0 | 0 | 0 | 0 | 0 | 0 | 0 | 0 | – | 0 |
| Reed Johnson, OF | 17 | 22 | 0 | 5 | 1 | 0 | 0 | 3 | 0 | 6 | .227 | 0 |
| Taylor Jordan, P | 4 | 6 | 0 | 2 | 0 | 0 | 0 | 0 | 0 | 2 | .333 | 0 |
| José Lobatón, C | 44 | 136 | 11 | 27 | 4 | 0 | 3 | 20 | 15 | 40 | .199 | 0 |
| Rafael Martin, P | 13 | 0 | 0 | 0 | 0 | 0 | 0 | 0 | 0 | 0 | – | 0 |
| Tyler Moore, 1B, LF | 97 | 187 | 14 | 38 | 12 | 0 | 6 | 27 | 11 | 45 | .203 | 0 |
| Jonathan Papelbon, P | 22 | 0 | 0 | 0 | 0 | 0 | 0 | 0 | 0 | 0 | – | 0 |
| Wilson Ramos, C | 128 | 475 | 41 | 109 | 16 | 0 | 15 | 68 | 21 | 101 | .229 | 0 |
| Anthony Rendon, 2B, 3B | 80 | 311 | 43 | 82 | 16 | 0 | 5 | 25 | 36 | 70 | .264 | 1 |
| Felipe Rivero, P | 49 | 0 | 0 | 0 | 0 | 0 | 0 | 0 | 0 | 0 | – | 0 |
| Tanner Roark, P | 40 | 27 | 1 | 5 | 2 | 0 | 0 | 0 | 0 | 9 | .185 | 0 |
| Clint Robinson, OF, 1B | 126 | 309 | 44 | 84 | 15 | 1 | 10 | 34 | 37 | 52 | .272 | 0 |
| Joe Ross, P | 17 | 27 | 2 | 3 | 0 | 0 | 0 | 0 | 0 | 11 | .111 | 0 |
| Max Scherzer, P | 33 | 69 | 4 | 15 | 0 | 0 | 0 | 0 | 2 | 23 | .217 | 0 |
| Pedro Severino, C | 2 | 4 | 1 | 1 | 1 | 0 | 0 | 0 | 0 | 1 | .250 | 0 |
| Sammy Solis, P | 18 | 2 | 0 | 1 | 0 | 0 | 0 | 0 | 0 | 0 | .500 | 0 |
| Denard Span, CF | 61 | 246 | 38 | 74 | 17 | 0 | 5 | 22 | 25 | 26 | .301 | 11 |
| Craig Stammen, P | 5 | 0 | 0 | 0 | 0 | 0 | 0 | 0 | 0 | 0 | – | 0 |
| Drew Storen, P | 58 | 0 | 0 | 0 | 0 | 0 | 0 | 0 | 0 | 0 | – | 0 |
| Stephen Strasburg, P | 23 | 38 | 1 | 5 | 0 | 0 | 0 | 0 | 2 | 17 | .132 | 0 |
| Michael A. Taylor, CF | 138 | 472 | 49 | 108 | 15 | 2 | 14 | 63 | 35 | 158 | .229 | 16 |
| Matt Thornton, P | 60 | 0 | 0 | 0 | 0 | 0 | 0 | 0 | 0 | 0 | – | 0 |
| Blake Treinen, P | 60 | 2 | 0 | 0 | 0 | 0 | 0 | 0 | 0 | 1 | .000 | 0 |
| Trea Turner, SS, 2B | 27 | 40 | 5 | 9 | 1 | 0 | 1 | 1 | 4 | 12 | .225 | 2 |
| Dan Uggla, 2B | 67 | 120 | 12 | 22 | 4 | 2 | 2 | 16 | 19 | 40 | .183 | 0 |
| Jayson Werth, LF | 88 | 331 | 51 | 73 | 16 | 1 | 12 | 42 | 38 | 84 | .221 | 0 |
| Ryan Zimmerman, 1B | 95 | 346 | 43 | 86 | 25 | 1 | 16 | 73 | 33 | 79 | .249 | 1 |
| Jordan Zimmermann, P | 33 | 63 | 4 | 10 | 1 | 0 | 0 | 3 | 0 | 18 | .159 | 0 |
| Team totals | 162 | 5428 | 703 | 1363 | 265 | 13 | 177 | 665 | 539 | 1344 | .251 | 57 |

=== Pitching ===
Through October 4, 2015
Note: W = Wins; L = Losses; ERA = Earned run average; G = Games pitched; GS = Games started; SV = Saves; IP = Innings pitched; H = Hits allowed; R = Runs allowed; ER = Earned runs allowed; HR = Home runs allowed; BB = Walks allowed; K = Strikeouts

| Player | W | L | ERA | G | GS | SV | IP | H | R | ER | HR | BB | K |
|---|---|---|---|---|---|---|---|---|---|---|---|---|---|
| Aaron Barrett | 3 | 3 | 4.60 | 40 | 0 | 0 | 29.1 | 28 | 15 | 15 | 1 | 7 | 35 |
| David Carpenter | 0 | 0 | 1.50 | 8 | 0 | 0 | 6.0 | 5 | 1 | 1 | 1 | 2 | 4 |
| Xavier Cedeño | 0 | 0 | 6.00 | 5 | 0 | 0 | 3.0 | 3 | 2 | 2 | 1 | 2 | 4 |
| A. J. Cole | 0 | 0 | 5.79 | 3 | 1 | 1 | 9.1 | 14 | 11 | 6 | 1 | 1 | 9 |
| Abel De Los Santos | 0 | 0 | 5.40 | 2 | 0 | 0 | 1.2 | 2 | 1 | 1 | 1 | 1 | 3 |
| Doug Fister | 5 | 7 | 4.19 | 25 | 15 | 1 | 103.0 | 120 | 56 | 48 | 14 | 24 | 63 |
| Gio González | 11 | 8 | 3.79 | 31 | 31 | 0 | 175.2 | 181 | 79 | 74 | 8 | 69 | 169 |
| Matt Grace | 2 | 1 | 4.24 | 26 | 0 | 0 | 17.0 | 26 | 11 | 8 | 0 | 8 | 14 |
| Taylor Hill | 0 | 0 | 3.75 | 6 | 0 | 0 | 12.0 | 14 | 5 | 5 | 2 | 4 | 9 |
| Casey Janssen | 2 | 5 | 4.95 | 48 | 0 | 0 | 40.0 | 38 | 22 | 22 | 5 | 8 | 27 |
| Taylor Jordan | 0 | 2 | 5.29 | 4 | 1 | 0 | 17.0 | 20 | 10 | 10 | 0 | 6 | 11 |
| Rafael Martin | 2 | 0 | 5.11 | 13 | 0 | 0 | 12.1 | 12 | 9 | 7 | 4 | 5 | 25 |
| Tyler Moore | 0 | 0 | 0.00 | 1 | 0 | 0 | 0.2 | 0 | 0 | 0 | 0 | 0 | 0 |
| Jonathan Papelbon | 2 | 2 | 3.04 | 22 | 0 | 7 | 23.2 | 22 | 13 | 8 | 4 | 4 | 16 |
| Felipe Rivero | 2 | 1 | 2.79 | 49 | 0 | 2 | 48.1 | 35 | 15 | 15 | 2 | 11 | 43 |
| Tanner Roark | 4 | 7 | 4.38 | 40 | 12 | 1 | 111.0 | 119 | 55 | 54 | 17 | 26 | 70 |
| Clint Robinson | 0 | 0 | 0.00 | 1 | 0 | 0 | 1.0 | 1 | 0 | 0 | 0 | 0 | 1 |
| Joe Ross | 5 | 5 | 3.64 | 16 | 13 | 0 | 76.2 | 64 | 33 | 31 | 7 | 21 | 69 |
| Max Scherzer | 14 | 12 | 2.79 | 33 | 33 | 0 | 228.2 | 176 | 74 | 71 | 27 | 34 | 276 |
| Sammy Solis | 1 | 1 | 3.38 | 18 | 0 | 0 | 21.1 | 25 | 11 | 8 | 2 | 4 | 17 |
| Craig Stammen | 0 | 0 | 0.00 | 5 | 0 | 0 | 4.0 | 2 | 0 | 0 | 0 | 3 | 3 |
| Drew Storen | 2 | 2 | 3.44 | 58 | 0 | 29 | 55.0 | 45 | 23 | 21 | 4 | 16 | 67 |
| Stephen Strasburg | 11 | 7 | 3.46 | 23 | 23 | 0 | 127.1 | 115 | 56 | 49 | 14 | 26 | 155 |
| Matt Thornton | 2 | 1 | 2.18 | 60 | 0 | 0 | 41.1 | 33 | 12 | 10 | 2 | 11 | 23 |
| Blake Treinen | 2 | 5 | 3.86 | 60 | 0 | 0 | 67.2 | 62 | 32 | 29 | 4 | 32 | 65 |
| Jordan Zimmermann | 13 | 10 | 3.66 | 33 | 33 | 0 | 201.2 | 204 | 89 | 82 | 24 | 39 | 164 |
| Team totals | 83 | 79 | 3.62 | 162 | 162 | 41 | 1434.2 | 1366 | 635 | 577 | 145 | 364 | 1342 |

=== Team leaders ===
Qualifying players only.

==== Batting ====
| Stat | Player | Total |
|---|---|---|
| Avg. | Bryce Harper | .330 |
| HR | Bryce Harper | 42 |
| RBI | Bryce Harper | 99 |
| R | Bryce Harper | 118 |
| H | Bryce Harper | 172 |
| SB | Michael A. Taylor | 16 |

==== Pitching ====
| Stat | Player | Total |
|---|---|---|
| W | Max Scherzer | 14 |
| L | Max Scherzer | 12 |
| ERA | Max Scherzer | 2.79 |
| SO | Max Scherzer | 267 |
| SV | Drew Storen | 29 |
| IP | Max Scherzer | 228.2 |

== Awards and honors ==
=== All-Stars ===
- Bryce Harper, OF
- Max Scherzer, P

Bryce Harper was a starting outfielder for the National League in the 2015 Major League Baseball All-Star Game. It was the third All-Star Game appearance of his four-year major league career, and his second appearance as a starter. In 2015 all-star fan voting, he received a National League-record 13.86 million votes, nearly four million more than the second-highest National League vote-getter, Buster Posey of the San Francisco Giants. (Note: Harper was one of three outfielders voted into the 2015 Major League Baseball All-Star Game as starters, alongside Matt Holliday of the St. Louis Cardinals and Giancarlo Stanton of the Miami Marlins. Due to injuries, neither Holliday nor Stanton played in the game.)

Max Scherzer was selected for the National League All-Star Team by player vote, the third selection of his career to the all-star team and his first as a National League player. He was a strong candidate to start for the National League in the game, but a Major League Baseball rule prohibiting pitchers who pitch in a game the day before the all-star break from pitching in the All-Star Game two nights later precluded him from appearing in the game after he pitched for the Nationals in a 3–2 victory over the Baltimore Orioles on July 13. Scherzer nonetheless traveled to the game and was honored as an all-star.

=== Annual awards ===
==== Hank Aaron Award ====
On October 31, 2015, Bryce Harper became the first player in the history of the Montreal-Washington franchise to win the National League Hank Aaron Award, which recognizes the most outstanding offensive performer in the league.

==== Players' Choice Award ====
On November 9, 2015, Bryce Harper received the Players' Choice Award for Outstanding Player in the National League. He became only the third player in Montreal-Washington franchise history (Note: Pedro Martínez won a Players Choice Award as the National League's Outstanding Pitcher while with the Montreal Expos in 2003.) and the second in Washington Nationals history to win a Players' Choice Award, and the first to do so since Dmitri Young won the Players' Choice Award for Comeback Player of the Year in 2007.

==== Silver Slugger ====
- Silver Slugger Award: Bryce Harper, OF

On November 12, 2015, it was announced that Bryce Harper had won the Silver Slugger for the first time in his career. It was the tenth Silver Slugger awarded to a National since the team arrived in Washington in 2005. It was also the fourth season in a row, and the sixth time in seven seasons, that at least one National had won a Silver Slugger.

==== Most Valuable Player ====
On November 19, 2015, Bryce Harper was announced as the winner of the 2015 National League Most Valuable Player Award. The youngest player ever to be selected as a unanimous choice, receiving all 30 first-place votes, he became the first player in the history of the Montreal-Washington franchise to win the award, and the first player for a Washington, D.C., Major League Baseball team to win it since shortstop Roger Peckinpaugh won the 1925 American League Most Valuable Player Award with the original Washington Senators. The 2015 season was the first one in which Harper had stayed healthy all year since debuting in the major leagues in 2012, allowing him to play in a career-high 153 games. He posted a .330 batting average, .460 on-base percentage, and .649 slugging percentage, led the major leagues with a 1.109 on-base plus slugging percentage, had a National League-high 195 OPS+, walked 124 times, hit 42 home runs, scored 118 runs, drove in 99 runs, and had a 9.5 fWAR. Only seven other players – Babe Ruth, Barry Bonds, Lou Gehrig, Mickey Mantle, and Ted Williams among them – had ever had batting averages, home runs, on-base percentages and slugging percentages in a single season equal to or better than Harper's in 2015. He was the first player in Major League Baseball history to combine at least 42 home runs and 124 walks in one season by age 22.

==== Esurance MLB Awards ====
- Best Major Leaguer: Bryce Harper
- Best Everyday Player: Bryce Harper

The Esurance MLB Awards were awarded for the first time in 2015. On November 20, 2015, Bryce Harper won two of them, for Best Major Leaguer and for Best Everyday Player.

== Farm system ==
| Level | Team | League | Manager |
|---|---|---|---|
| AAA | Syracuse Chiefs | International League | Billy Gardner Jr. |
| AA | Harrisburg Senators | Eastern League | Brian Daubach |
| A-Advanced | Potomac Nationals | Carolina League | Tripp Keister |
| A | Hagerstown Suns | South Atlantic League | Patrick Anderson |
| A-Short Season | Auburn Doubledays | New York–Penn League | Gary Cathcart |
| Rookie | GCL Nationals | Gulf Coast League | Michael Barrett |
| Rookie | DSL Nationals | Dominican Summer League | Sandy Martínez |
