= Taylor Gushue =

American baseball player (born 1993)

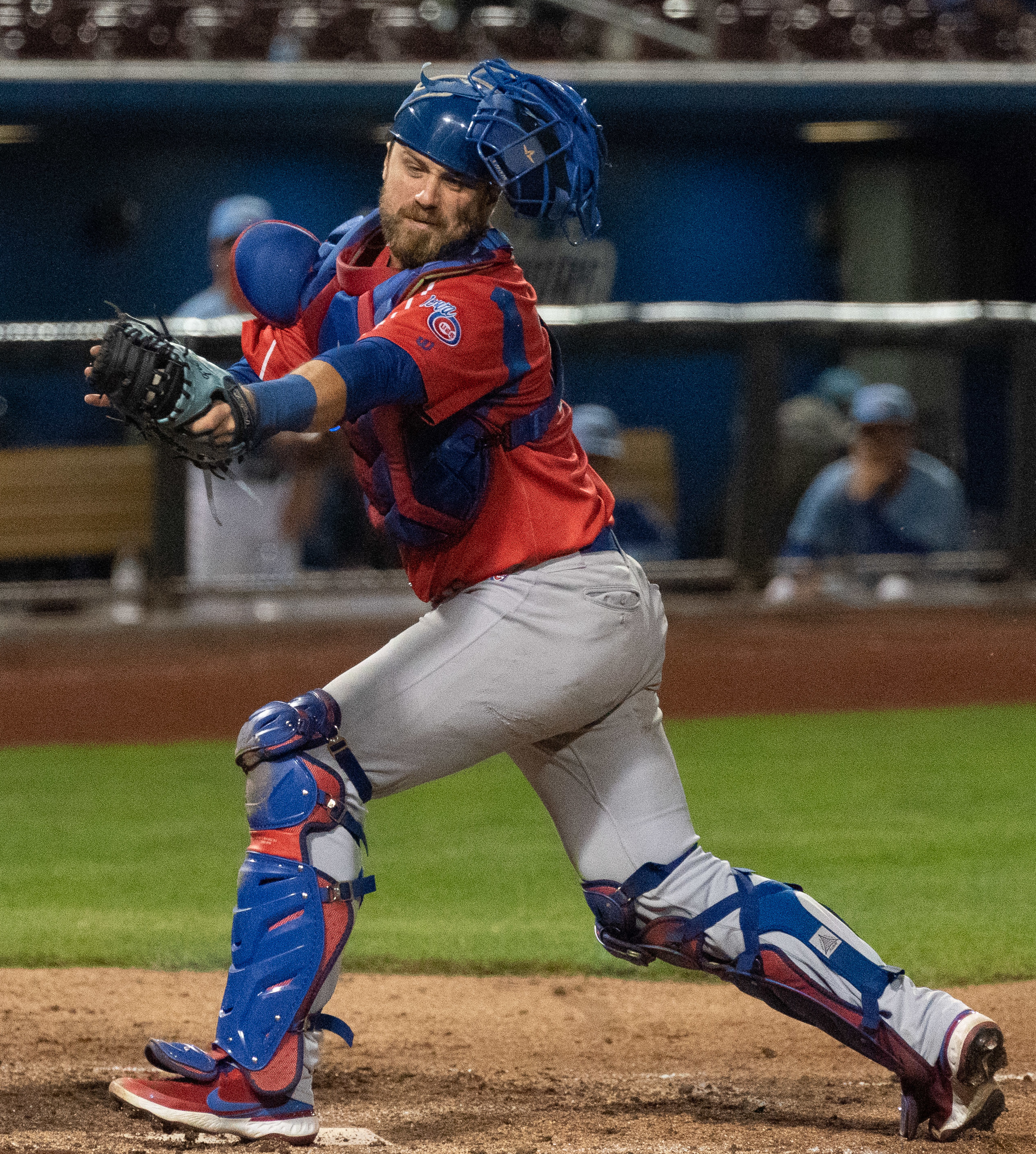
- Gushue with the Iowa Cubs in 2021
- Catcher / First baseman
- Born: December 19, 1993 (age 32); Boca Raton, Florida, U.S.
- Batted: Switch Threw: Right

MLB debut
- June 30, 2021, for the Chicago Cubs

Last MLB appearance
- July 4, 2021, for the Chicago Cubs

MLB statistics
- Batting average: .000
- Home runs: 0
- Runs batted in: 0
- Stats at Baseball Reference

Teams
- Chicago Cubs (2021)

Taylor Stone Gushue (born December 19, 1993) is an American former professional baseball catcher. He played in Major League Baseball (MLB) for the Chicago Cubs. He was drafted by the Pittsburgh Pirates in the 4th round of the 2014 Major League Baseball draft.

== Career ==
=== Amateur career ===
A native of Boca Raton, Florida, Gushue attended Calvary Christian Academy in Fort Lauderdale, Florida, and the University of Florida. In 2013, he played collegiate summer baseball with the Yarmouth–Dennis Red Sox of the Cape Cod Baseball League.

=== Pittsburgh Pirates ===
A fourth-round pick of the Pittsburgh Pirates in the 2014 Major League Baseball (MLB) draft, Gushue signed for a $388,800 signing bonus. Though drafted as a catcher, Gushue had also played first base at Florida. After signing, he was assigned to the Jamestown Jammers where he batted .241/.336/.402 with five home runs and 29 RBIs.

In 2015, he played with the West Virginia Power, batting .231/.288/.342 with five home runs and 47 RBIs in 99 games.

In 2016, he played with the Bradenton Marauders, where batted .226/.282/.357 with eight home runs and 38 RBIs.

=== Washington Nationals ===
On September 26, 2016, Gushue was traded to the Washington Nationals in exchange for infielder Christopher Bostick.

While not considered a remarkable hitter in the Pirates organization, Gushue demonstrated an immediate power surge in the Nationals organization, where he started 2017 with the High–A Potomac Nationals. He was named a Carolina League All-Star, alongside teammates Víctor Robles and Kelvin Gutiérrez. Midseason prospect rankings produced by MLB Pipeline saw Gushue vault into the Nationals' top 30 prospects, ranking as their third-best catching prospect behind Raudy Read and Pedro Severino and coming in at 25th overall among Washington prospects. Gushue led the Potomac Nationals in home runs with 18 on the season along with slashing .241/.327/.437 with 67 RBI. He finished the season with the Double–A Harrisburg Senators, playing four games with them. He went on to play for 13 games for the Mesa Solar Sox in the Arizona Fall League after the season.

Gushue was invited to participate in 2018 and 2019 spring training with the Nationals. In 2018, playing for the Triple–A Syracuse Chiefs and the Double–A Harrisburg Senators, he batted .213/.292/.364 with 10 home runs and 44 RBI. In 2019, playing for the Triple–A Fresno Grizzlies, Gushue batted .312/.358/.517 with 11 home runs and 39 RBI. After the season, on October 10, he was selected for the United States national baseball team in the 2019 WBSC Premier 12 tournament in November 2019.

Gushue did not play in a game in 2020 due to the cancellation of the minor league season because of the COVID-19 pandemic. On November 2, 2020, he elected free agency.

=== Chicago Cubs ===
On November 16, 2020, Gushue signed a minor league contract with the Chicago Cubs organization. He was assigned to the Triple-A Iowa Cubs to begin the 2021 season, where he slashed .272/.328/.440 with 5 home runs and 27 RBI in 36 games. On June 30, 2021, Gushue was selected to the 40-man roster and promoted to the major leagues for the first time following an injury to José Lobatón. He made his MLB debut that day as an injury replacement for Patrick Wisdom. Gushue went 0-4 in 2 games with Chicago before he was designated for assignment on July 5. He was outrighted to Iowa on July 8. Gushue became a free agent following the 2021 season.

=== Washington Nationals (second stint) ===
On February 10, 2022, Gushue signed a minor league contract to return to the Washington Nationals. In 76 games split between the Double-A Harrisburg Senators and Triple-A Rochester Red Wings, he slashed .217/.349/.392 with 10 home runs and 35 RBI. Gushue elected free agency following the season on November 10.
