= Sammy Solís =

American baseball player (born 1988)

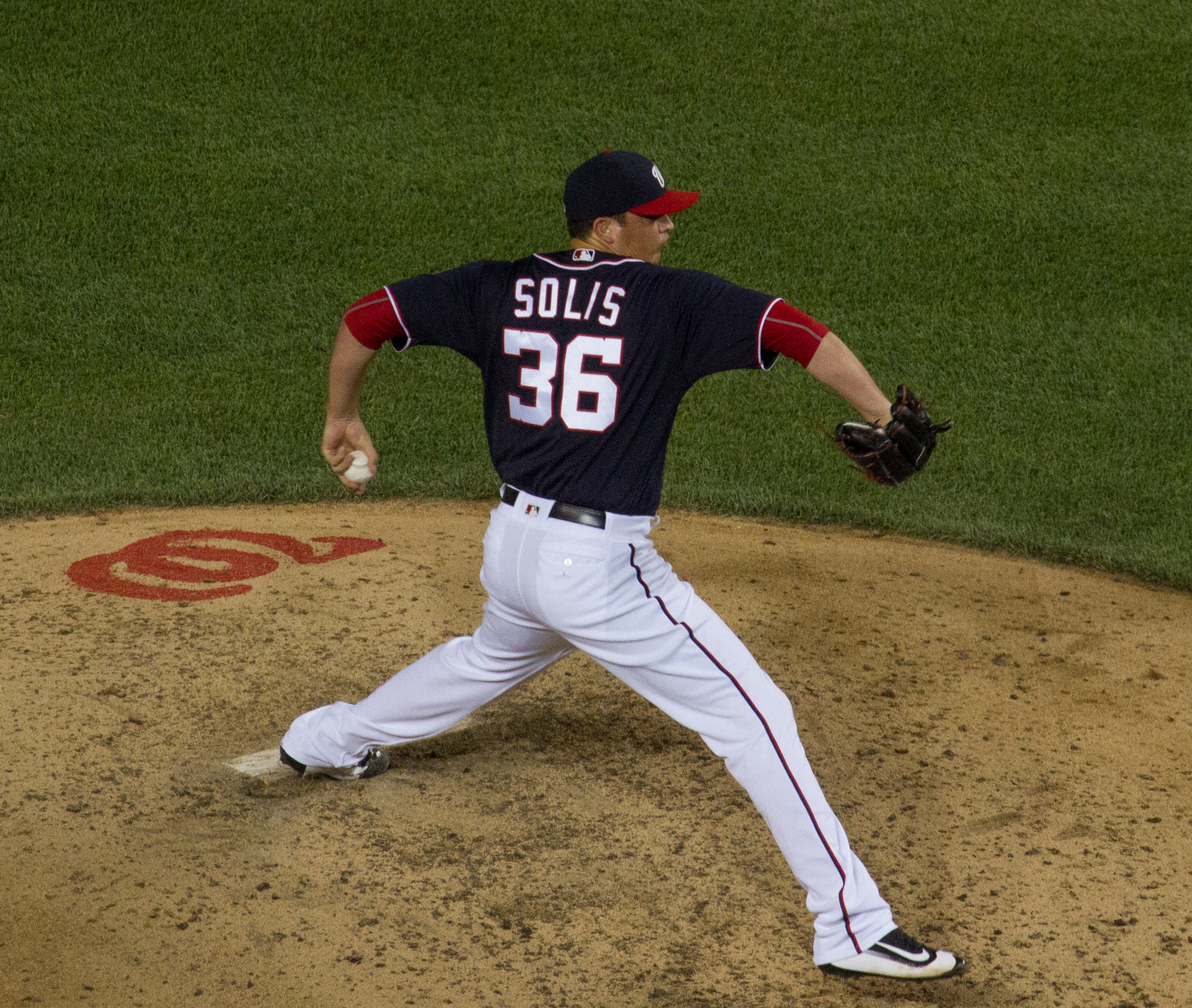
- Solís with the Washington Nationals on July 1, 2016.
- Pitcher
- Born: August 10, 1988 (age 37); Minneapolis, Minnesota, U.S.
- Batted: Right Threw: Left

Professional debut
- MLB: April 30, 2015, for the Washington Nationals
- NPB: July 7, 2019, for the Yokohama DeNA BayStars

Last appearance
- MLB: September 28, 2018, for the Washington Nationals
- NPB: July 19, 2019, for the Yokohama DeNA BayStars

MLB statistics
- Win–loss record: 5–7
- Earned run average: 4.51
- Strikeouts: 136

NPB statistics
- Win–loss record: 0–0
- Earned run average: 2.08
- Strikeouts: 2
- Stats at Baseball Reference

Teams
- Washington Nationals (2015–2018); Yokohama DeNA BayStars (2019)

Samuel Solís (born August 10, 1988) is an American former professional baseball pitcher. He played in Major League Baseball (MLB) for the Washington Nationals and in Nippon Professional Baseball (NPB) for the Yokohama DeNA BayStars.

== Career ==
=== High school and college ===
Solís attended Agua Fria High School in Avondale, Arizona. Playing for the school's baseball team, he had a 7–3 win–loss record and a 1.77 earned run average (ERA) with 117 strikeouts and 29 walks with 25 hits allowed in 59 1/3 innings pitched in his sophomore year. He shared West Valley High School Baseball Player of the Year honors with Kole Calhoun. In his junior year, he had a 4–4 record and a 1.93 ERA, and recorded 87 strikeouts with 23 walks and 45 hits in 63 2/3 innings. While in his junior year, he competed in the American Amateur Baseball Congress and won the 2006 Connie Mack World Series. As a senior, Solís had an 8–2 record, a 2.40 ERA, and 98 strikeouts to 43 hits and 23 walks in 61 1/3 innings. He was again named West Valley's High School Baseball Co-Player of the Year, along with Cody Cress. Solís finished his high school career with a 25–8 win–loss record and 398 strikeouts, the second-most in Arizona Class 4A history. Solis was also a dual sport athlete playing the varsity football team alongside Minnesota Vikings defensive end Everson Griffen.

Baseball America ranked Solís as the 53rd-best prospect available in the 2007 Major League Baseball (MLB) Draft. The Arizona Diamondbacks selected Solís in the 18th round of the draft, but he did not sign in order to play college baseball. Solís attended the University of San Diego, where he played for the San Diego Toreros baseball team. As a freshman, Solís had a 3–1 record and a 3.83 earned run average (ERA) in 17 games pitched, which included seven games started. He pitched for the Chatham A's of the Cape Cod Baseball League in the summer of 2008, where he pitched largely out of the rotation and was named a league all-star. Expected to pitch more in 2009 due to San Diego teammate Brian Matusz signing a professional contract, Solís instead injured his back while weightlifting. He returned as a redshirt sophomore in 2010, and had a 9–2 record and a 3.42 ERA with 92 strikeouts and 82 hits allowed in 92 innings pitched. He was named All-West Coast Conference.

=== Washington Nationals ===
The Washington Nationals selected Solís in the second round, with the 51st overall selection of the 2010 MLB draft, and Solís received a $1 million signing bonus to sign with Washington. Pitching for the Scottsdale Scorpions of the Arizona Fall League (AFL) after the 2010 regular season, Solís won the AFL championship. He again pitched in the AFL after the 2011 regular season, when he damaged the ulnar collateral ligament (UCL) in his elbow. Before the 2012 season, MLB.com rated Solís as the 86th-best prospect in baseball. He had Tommy John surgery to repair the UCL in March 2012 and missed the 2012 season. He returned to Potomac in 2013, and was assigned to the AFL after the 2013 season.

After the 2013 season, the Nationals added Solís to their 40-man roster. He was shut down in June 2014 with discomfort in his elbow after making one start for the Harrisburg Senators of the Class AA Eastern League. Solís began the 2015 season with Harrisburg. He was promoted to the major leagues on April 29, and made his major league debut the next day.

Solís started the 2016 season at Triple-A Syracuse, but he was called up April 27 after reliever Matt Belisle was injured and placed on the disabled list. Solís himself spent time on the disabled list in 2016, briefly being listed with knee soreness on July 17 and then being sidelined with left shoulder inflammation from August 17 to September 26. Solís was regarded as having what an SB Nation writer called "something of a breakout season" in 2016, pitching to a 2.41 ERA in 41 innings and proving equally effective against hitters on both sides of the plate. He appeared in all five games of the 2016 National League Division Series against the Los Angeles Dodgers.

Injuries once again plagued Solís in the Nationals' 2017 season. Although he started the year in the major league bullpen, he landed on the disabled list on April 19 with left elbow inflammation and struggled after being activated July 1 after an extended rehabilitation stint in the minor leagues. Solís was optioned back to Syracuse over the All-Star Break after several poor performances in relief.

During the 2018 season, Solís appeared in a career-high 56 games for the Nationals, primarily as a situational left-handed pitcher against left-handed batters. He had difficulty against left-handed batters during the year; they had a .993 on-base plus slugging percentage in 88 match-ups against him, hitting five home runs, two doubles, and two triples. He allowed 28 runs in 39 1/3 innings pitched with 18 walks and 44 strikeouts and finished the season with a record of 1–2 and a career-worst 6.41 ERA.

Solís was scheduled to reach non-tender free agency on November 30, 2018, but the Nationals avoided that by signing him to a one-year deal that day, partly because his success against left-handed batters prior to 2018 suggested that he might again succeed against them in the future. He made four appearances for the Nationals during spring training in 2019, but the Nationals concluded that he would not make the 2019 team and unconditionally released him on March 9, 2019. At the time of his release he had a career ERA of 4.51 with 136 strikeouts and 56 walks in 127 2/3 innings pitched, a .701 OPS against right-handed hitters, and a .759 OPS against left-handed batters.

=== San Diego Padres ===
On March 11, 2019, Solis signed a minor league deal with the San Diego Padres. He was released on May 30, 2019.

=== Yokohama DeNA BayStars ===
On May 31, 2019, Solis signed with Yokohama DeNA BayStars of the Nippon Professional Baseball (NPB). On October 16, the BayStars announced that the team would not sign Solís for the next season. On December 2, he became a free agent.

=== Acereros de Monclova ===
On April 9, 2021, Solís signed with the Acereros de Monclova of the Mexican League. He was on the Mexico national baseball team roster for the 2020 Summer Olympics (in July 2021), but a positive COVID-19 result disqualified him. In 25 appearances for Monclova, Solís compiled a 3-0 record and 2.57 ERA with 24 strikeouts over 21 innings of work. He became a free agent following the season.

== Personal life ==
Solís is of both Irish and Mexican descent. He has three sisters and a brother, with two of his siblings having been adopted. When he was in high school, his family opened an orphanage in South Africa for children who lost their parents to the AIDS epidemic.
