= Matt Grace =

American baseball player (born 1988)

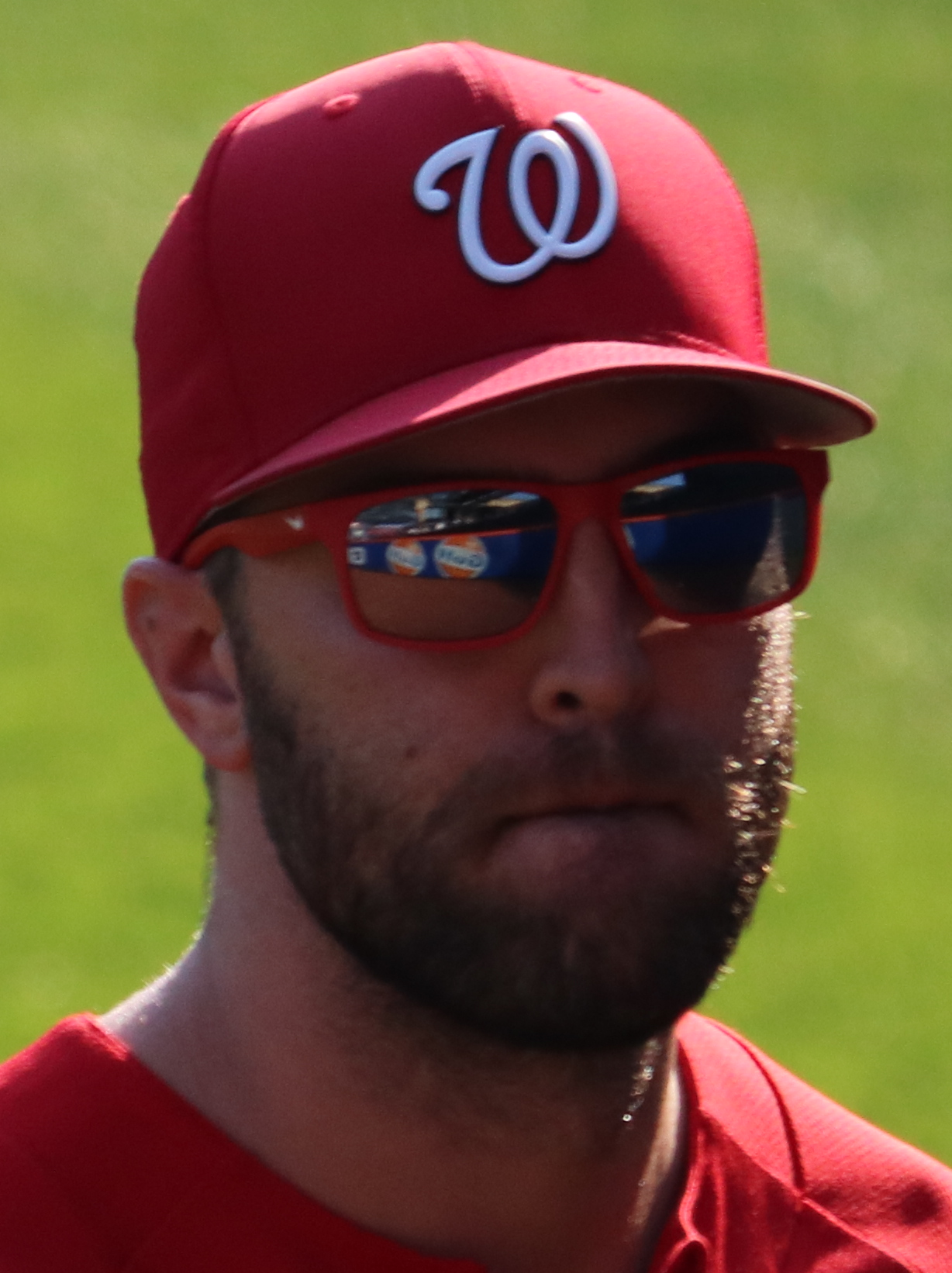
- Grace with the Nationals in 2018
- Pitcher
- Born: December 14, 1988 (age 37); Palos Verdes, California, U.S.
- Batted: Left Threw: Left

MLB debut
- April 22, 2015, for the Washington Nationals

Last MLB appearance
- August 26, 2020, for the Arizona Diamondbacks

MLB statistics
- Win–loss record: 5–5
- Earned run average: 4.57
- Strikeouts: 134
- Stats at Baseball Reference

Teams
- Washington Nationals (2015–2019); Arizona Diamondbacks (2020)

Matthew Aaron Grace (born December 14, 1988) is an American former professional baseball pitcher. He previously played in Major League Baseball (MLB) for the Washington Nationals and Arizona Diamondbacks.

== Career ==
=== Amateur career ===
Grace graduated from Palos Verdes High School and then played college baseball at the University of California, Los Angeles (UCLA) for the UCLA Bruins from 2008 to 2010. He was mostly a relief pitcher, but started six games during his career. Over his three-year career at UCLA, he pitched in 72 games, going 4–4 with a 3.92 earned run average (ERA) and 75 strikeouts. In 2009, he played collegiate summer baseball with the Cotuit Kettleers of the Cape Cod Baseball League.

=== Washington Nationals ===
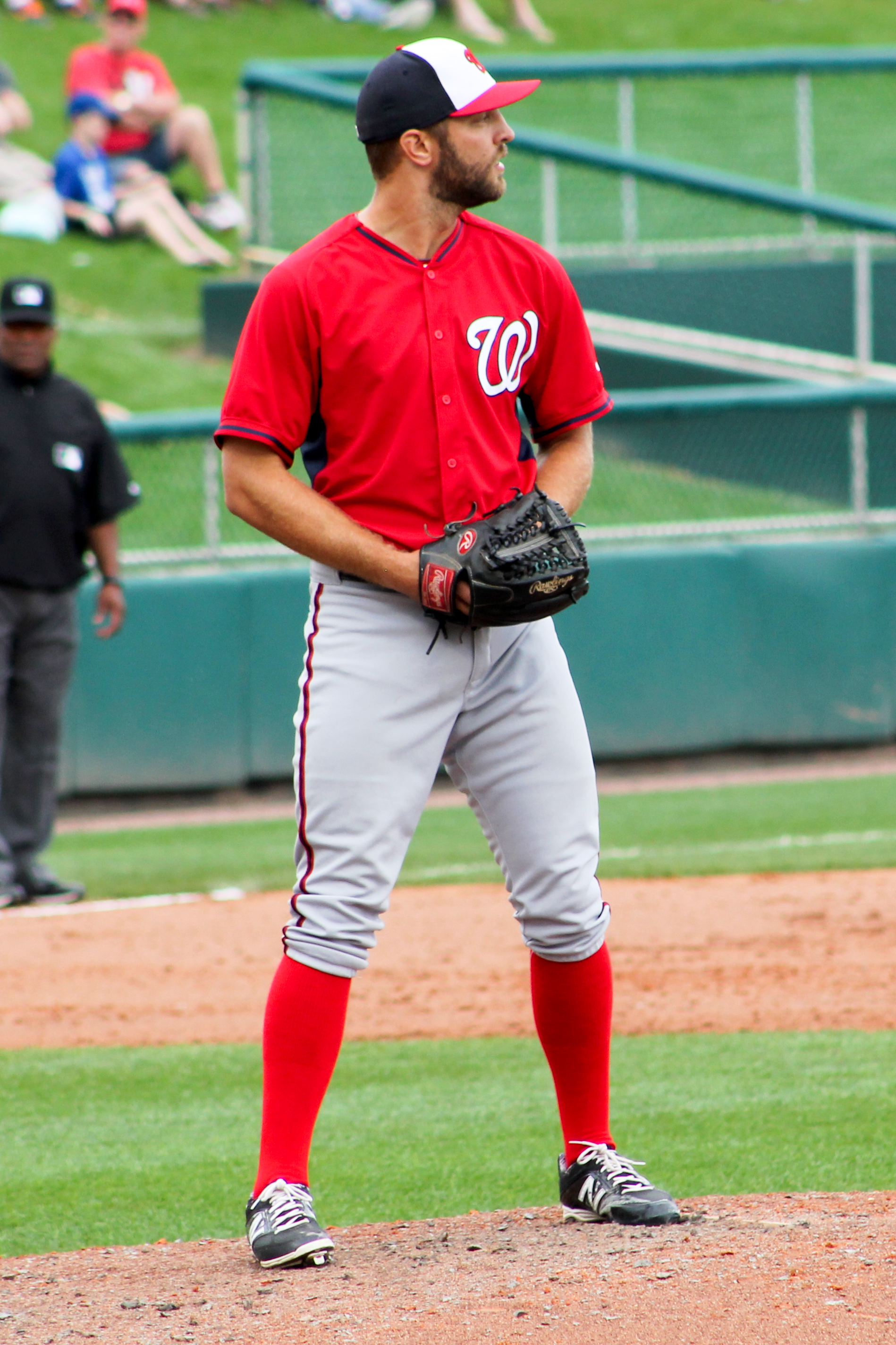
Grace with the Nationals in 2015

Grace was drafted by the Washington Nationals in the eighth round of the 2010 Major League Baseball draft. He was converted into a starting pitcher with the Nationals and made his professional debut that season with the Gulf Coast Nationals. After spending three seasons without success starting, Grace was moved back to relieving before the 2013 season. Grace spent 2014 with the Double-A Hagerstown Suns and Triple-A Syracuse Chiefs.

Grace made his major league debut with the Nationals on April 22, 2015, pitching a scoreless inning in relief against the St. Louis Cardinals. After an outing against the Cincinnati Reds on May 31, 2015, in which he gave up four runs without recording an out, the Nationals optioned Grace back to Syracuse. Grace spent most of the remainder of the 2015 season and then the 2016 season with the Chiefs, being promoted for brief stints in both seasons after rosters expanded in September.

In the 2017 season, a shaky first-half performance by the Nationals' bullpen and a string of injuries to major league pitchers meant Grace served as a regular up-and-down reliever, shuttling between the Nationals and the Chiefs as needed. On July 14, 2017, Grace was called upon with the bases loaded and two outs in the ninth inning of a 5–0 game against the Reds, in his first appearance at Great American Ball Park since May 31, 2015, and induced a game-ending groundout to secure his first major league save.

On August 30, 2019, the Nationals designated Grace for assignment after he posted a 6.36 earned run average across 46 2/3 innings in 51 appearances during the 2019 season. He was outrighted to the Class-AAA Fresno Grizzlies after clearing waivers. He elected free agency on October 1, 2019.

=== Arizona Diamondbacks ===
Grace signed a minor league contract with the Arizona Diamondbacks, who invited to major league spring training, on November 18, 2019. The Diamondbacks added Grace to the active roster on August 19, 2020. On August 27, 2020, Grace was designated for assignment after he posted a 54.00 earned run average across 1 inning over 3 games. Grace elected free agency on October 6, 2020.
