= Rafael Martin =

American baseball player (born 1984)

Rafael Martín
- Pitcher
- Born: May 16, 1984 (age 42); San Fernando, California, U.S.
- Batted: Right Threw: Right

MLB debut
- April 15, 2015, for the Washington Nationals

Last MLB appearance
- September 30, 2016, for the Washington Nationals

MLB statistics
- Win–loss record: 2–0
- Earned run average: 4.50
- Strikeouts: 30
- Stats at Baseball Reference

Teams
- Washington Nationals (2015–2016)

Rafael Martín Romero (born May 16, 1984) is an American former professional baseball pitcher. He has played in Major League Baseball (MLB) for the Washington Nationals.

== Early life ==
Martin was born in California but spent parts of his childhood in Mexico until the 7th grade. Martin attended Jurupa Valley High School in Jurupa Valley, California. He played for the school's varsity baseball team for one year. Though coaches at University of Redlands and Riverside Community College offered Martin the opportunity to walk on to their college baseball teams, they did not offer scholarships, and Martin opted not to attend college. He went to work for a contractor in Fontana, California, becoming a crew foreman and dispatcher.

== Career ==
=== Saraperos de Saltillo (first stint) ===
Martin attended a tryout with the Saraperos de Saltillo of the Mexican League in 2007. He signed with them and made his professional baseball debut that year. On the season, Martin pitched to a 2.65 ERA with 17 strikeouts in 34.0 innings. In 2008, Martin recorded a 4.19 ERA and 6–2 record in 35 games for the Saraperos, notching 38 strikeouts as well. In 2009, Martin appeared in 54 games for Saltillo, accumulating a 6–3 record and 4.12 ERA in 63.1 innings pitched.

=== Washington Nationals ===
The Washington Nationals signed Martin out of the Mexican League in 2010. In 2011, Martin pitched for the Potomac Nationals of the High–A Carolina League and the Harrisburg Senators of the Double–A Eastern League. The Nationals assigned him to the Arizona Fall League after the regular season. He struggled with elbow and shoulder injuries in 2012. Martin split the 2013 season between Potomac and the GCL Nationals, pitching to an excellent 0.87 ERA with 39 strikeouts in 21 games. In 2014, he pitched for the Syracuse Chiefs of the Triple–A International League. He had a 0.80 ERA for Syracuse, allowing a run in only two of his 38 appearances.

The Nationals invited Martin to spring training in 2015. They assigned him to Syracuse to start the year, but selected his contract and promoted him to the major leagues on April 14. The following day, Martin made his major league debut, facing the Boston Red Sox at Fenway Park. He started the seventh inning; after allowing a fly out and a single, he proceeded to strike out the next five consecutive batters over two innings. In 13 games for the Nationals in 2015, Martin recorded a 5.11 ERA with 25 strikeouts in 12.1 innings of work. Martin spent much of the 2016 season in Triple-A Syracuse, and was named an International League All-Star. In 8 major league games, Martin recorded a 2.45 ERA with 5 strikeouts in 3.2 innings.

Martin was assigned to Syracuse to begin the 2017 season, and recorded a 5.18 ERA and 7.77 K/9 for the team in 24.1 innings before he was designated for assignment on June 5, 2017. On June 9, Martin was outrighted and remained in Syracuse to finish the year. He elected free agency following the season on November 6.

=== Saraperos de Saltillo (second stint) ===
On March 21, 2018, Martin signed with the Saraperos de Saltillo of the Mexican Baseball League. He allowed 14 runs in 49.1 innings of work in 2018. In 2019, Martin pitched to a 4.98 ERA with 54 strikeouts in 43 games for Saltillo. Martin did not play in a game in 2020 due to the cancellation of the LMB season because of the COVID-19 pandemic.

== Personal life ==
In June 2021, Martin was diagnosed with Guillain–Barré syndrome.
