= Abel De Los Santos =

Dominican baseball player (born 1992)

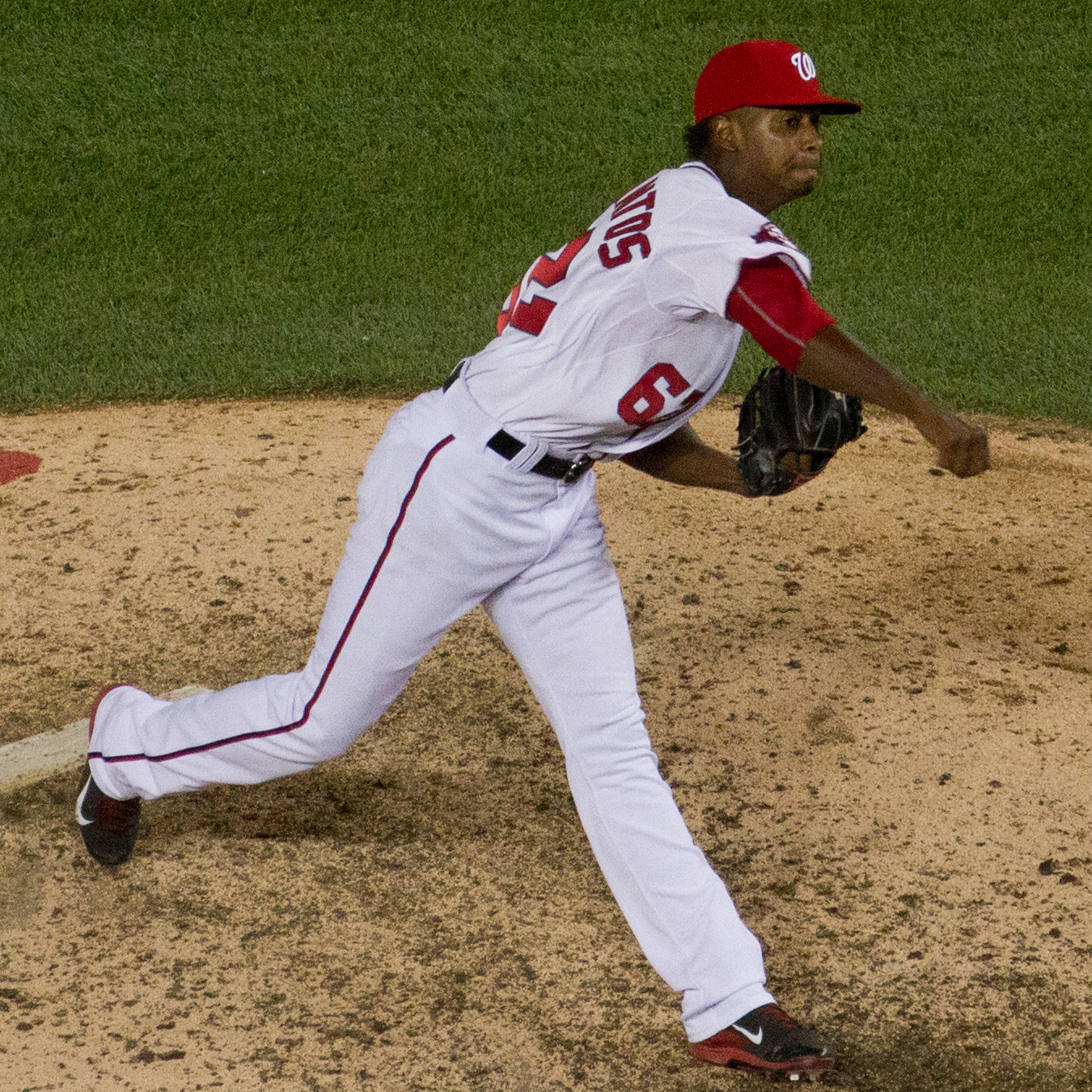
- De Los Santos with the Washington Nationals
- Pitcher
- Born: November 21, 1992 (age 33); Puerto Plata, Dominican Republic
- Batted: Right Threw: Right

MLB debut
- July 21, 2015, for the Washington Nationals

Last MLB appearance
- September 30, 2016, for the Cincinnati Reds

MLB statistics
- Win–loss record: 0–0
- Earned run average: 9.82
- Strikeouts: 5
- Stats at Baseball Reference

Teams
- Washington Nationals (2015); Cincinnati Reds (2016)

Abel De Los Santos Mejía (born November 21, 1992) is a Dominican former professional baseball pitcher. He played in Major League Baseball (MLB) for the Washington Nationals and Cincinnati Reds.

== Career ==
=== Texas Rangers ===
De Los Santos signed with the Texas Rangers as an international free agent in 2009. Initially a starting pitcher, the Rangers converted him into a relief pitcher in 2013.

=== Washington Nationals ===
After the 2014 season, the Rangers traded De Los Santos and Chris Bostick to the Washington Nationals for Ross Detwiler.

De Los Santos began the 2015 season with the Harrisburg Senators of the Double–A Eastern League. The Nationals promoted De Los Santos to the major leagues on July 20. He made his major league debut the next day. De Los Santos appeared in two games for the Nationals, before they optioned him to Harrisburg on July 25.

=== Cincinnati Reds ===
De Los Santos was claimed off waivers by the Cincinnati Reds on July 19, 2016. The Reds promoted De Los Santos to the major leagues from the Pensacola Blue Wahoos of the Double-A Southern League on September 12.

=== Los Angeles Angels of Anaheim ===
On October 28, 2016, De Los Santos was claimed off waivers by the Los Angeles Angels. De Los Santos was designated for assignment by the Angels on November 18, and sent outright to Triple-A on November 23. He split the 2017 season between three Angels affiliates, the rookie-level AZL Angels, the Double-A Mobile BayBears, and the Triple-A Salt Lake Bees, accumulating a 2.95 ERA with 44 strikeouts in 28 total appearances. He elected free agency on November 6, 2017.

=== Tecolotes de los Dos Laredos ===
On August 13, 2018, De Los Santos signed with the Tecolotes de los Dos Laredos of the Mexican League. De Los Santos struggled to a 7.59 ERA in 10 games for Dos Laredos. He became a free agent following the season.

=== Brantford Red Sox ===
On April 3, 2019, De Los Santos signed with the Brantford Red Sox of the Intercounty Baseball League. De Los Santos worked to a 5.15 ERA with 42 strikeouts in 50 2/3 innings of work across 10 games (8 of them starts). He became a free agent after the year.
