= Christopher Bostick =

American baseball player (born 1993)

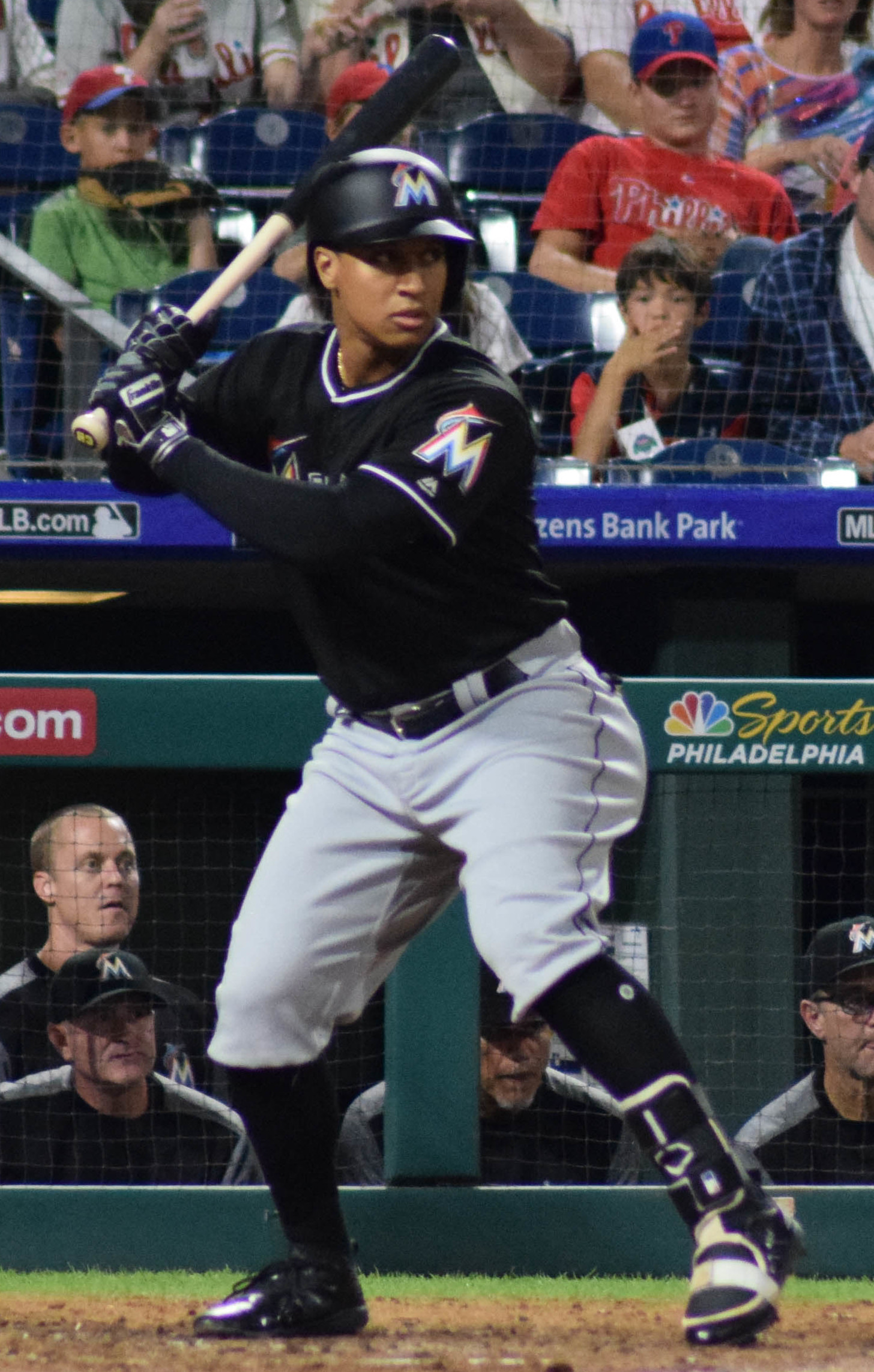
- Bostick with the Miami Marlins in 2018
- Second baseman / Outfielder
- Born: March 24, 1993 (age 33); Rochester, New York, U.S.
- Batted: Right Threw: Right

MLB debut
- May 8, 2017, for the Pittsburgh Pirates

Last MLB appearance
- September 30, 2018, for the Miami Marlins

MLB statistics
- Batting average: .256
- Home runs: 0
- Run batted in: 3
- Stats at Baseball Reference

Teams
- Pittsburgh Pirates (2017–2018); Miami Marlins (2018)

Christopher Michael Bostick (born March 24, 1993) is an American former professional baseball outfielder and second baseman. He played in Major League Baseball (MLB) for the Pittsburgh Pirates and Miami Marlins.

== Career ==
Bostick grew up in Gates, New York, and attended the Aquinas Institute in Rochester, New York. Playing for the school's baseball team, he had a .507 batting average as a junior and a .510 average as a senior. In his senior year, he was named the New York State Class B Player of the Year. He committed to attend St. John's University on a college baseball scholarship.

=== Oakland Athletics ===
The Oakland Athletics selected Bostick in the 44th round, with the 1,366th overall selection, of the 2011 MLB draft. He opted to sign with the Athletics rather than attend college, and received a $125,000 signing bonus.

Bostick made his professional debut with the Arizona Athletics of the Rookie-level Arizona League in 2011, and played for the Vermont Lake Monsters of the Low–A New York–Penn League in 2012. He appeared in the New York–Penn League All-Star Game. The Athletics assigned Bostick to the Beloit Snappers of the Single–A Midwest League in 2013.

=== Texas Rangers ===
On December 3, 2013, the Athletics traded Bostick and Michael Choice to the Texas Rangers for outfielder Craig Gentry and pitcher Josh Lindblom. Playing for the Myrtle Beach Pelicans of the High–A Carolina League, Bostick had a .251 batting average, a .322 on-base percentage, and a .412 slugging percentage.

=== Washington Nationals ===
After the 2014 season, the Rangers traded Bostick and Abel De Los Santos to the Washington Nationals for Ross Detwiler. Bostick began the 2015 season with the Potomac Nationals of the Carolina League, and was promoted to the Harrisburg Senators of the Double–A Eastern League in June, and then played for the Salt River Rafters in the Arizona Fall League following the 2015 season, where he had ten extra base hits in 71 at bats. The Nationals added him to their 40-man roster after the 2015 season. After beginning the 2016 season with Harrisburg, he received a promotion to the Syracuse Chiefs of the Triple–A International League in June.

=== Pittsburgh Pirates ===
The Nationals designated Bostick for assignment in September 2016. They traded him to the Pittsburgh Pirates for Taylor Gushue and cash considerations. He began the 2017 season with the Indianapolis Indians of the International League, and was promoted to the major leagues on May 8. He batted 8-for-27 (.296) for the Pirates in 2017.

The Pirates designated Bostick for assignment on August 7, 2018.

=== Miami Marlins ===
On August 12, 2018, the Miami Marlins acquired Bostick from Pittsburgh in exchange for cash considerations. In 16 games for the Triple–A New Orleans Baby Cakes, he hit .281/.338/.297 with no home runs and six RBI. In 13 games for the Marlins, Bostick batted .214/.313/.286 with two RBI. He was removed from the 40–man roster and sent outright to New Orleans on October 12. Bostick elected to become a free agent following the season on November 2.

=== Baltimore Orioles ===
On November 14, 2018, Bostick signed a minor league deal with the Baltimore Orioles and was assigned to the Triple-A Norfolk Tides of the International League for the 2019 season. In 106 games for Norfolk, Bostick hit .258/.323/.421 with 12 home runs and 50 RBI. He became a free agent following the season on November 4, 2019.
