= Pedro Severino =

Dominican baseball player (born 1993)

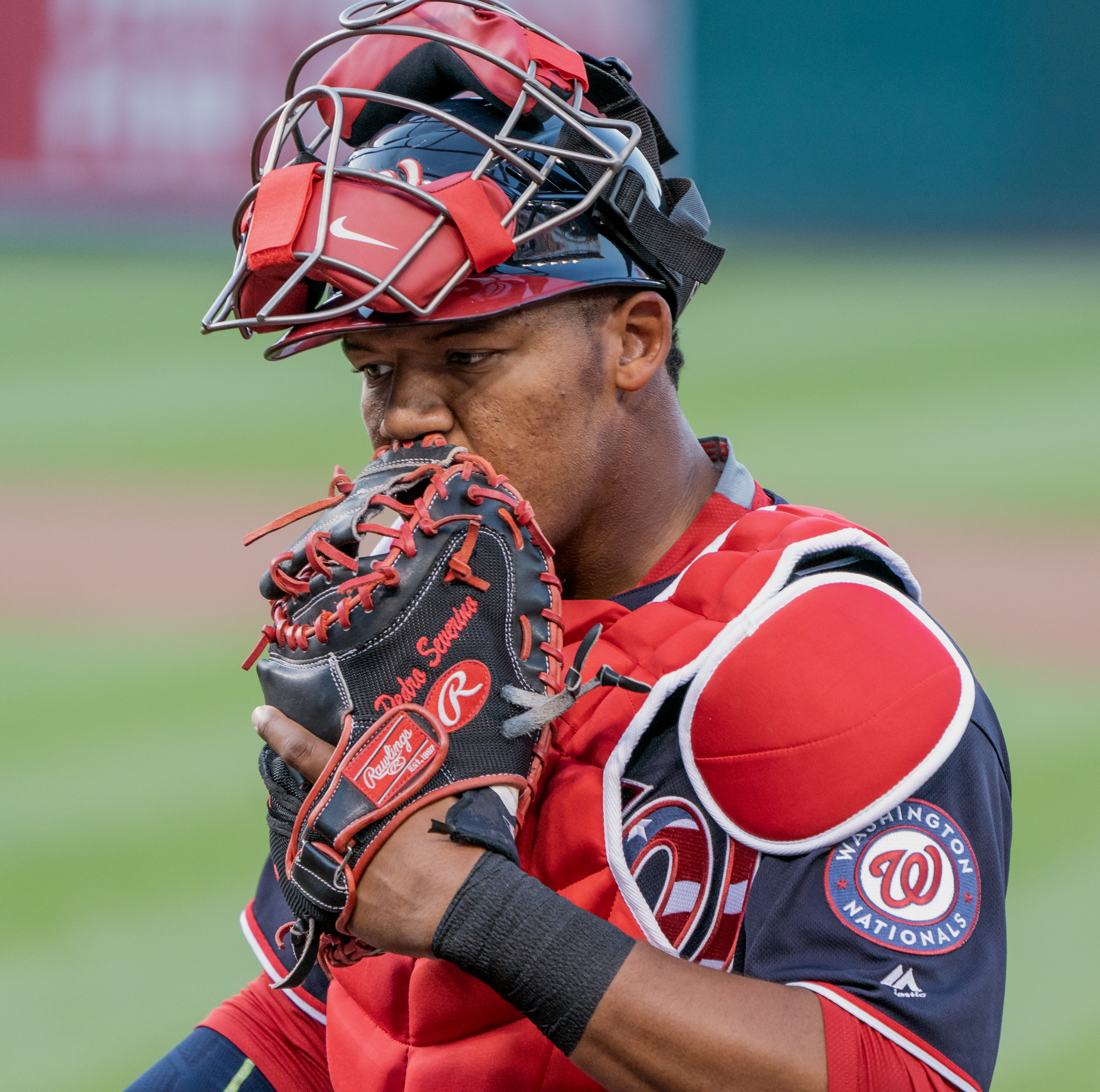
- Severino with the Washington Nationals in 2018
- Catcher
- Born: July 20, 1993 (age 33); Bonao, Dominican Republic
- Batted: Right Threw: Right

MLB debut
- September 20, 2015, for the Washington Nationals

Last MLB appearance
- August 2, 2022, for the Milwaukee Brewers

Career statistics
- Batting average: .235
- Home runs: 33
- Runs batted in: 134
- Stats at Baseball Reference

Teams
- Washington Nationals (2015–2018); Baltimore Orioles (2019–2021); Milwaukee Brewers (2022)

Pedro Severino De León (born July 20, 1993) is a Dominican former professional baseball catcher. He has previously played in Major League Baseball (MLB) for the Washington Nationals, Baltimore Orioles, and Milwaukee Brewers.

== Professional career ==
=== Washington Nationals ===
Severino began playing baseball in the Dominican Republic as a pitcher, outfielder, and third baseman. In 2009, at the age of 15, his team needed a catcher, so a coach asked Severino to fill in. The coach noticed Severino's potential at catcher when he threw out a baserunner attempting to steal second base, and asked him to keep catching. He considered quitting, but his father encouraged him to try catching.

In 2010, the Nationals signed Severino for a $55,000 signing bonus as a catcher. He debuted in 2011 for the Gulf Coast Nationals of the Rookie-level Gulf Coast League (GCL), where he struggled to gain the trust of his pitchers due to his youth and inability to understand English. He began to learn English, and worked on his catching development. After repeating the GCL in 2012, Severino played for the Hagerstown Suns of the Class A South Atlantic League (SAL) in 2013, where he was the team's youngest player. He batted .241, but threw out 40% of basestealers, and was named a SAL all-star. In 2014, Severino played for the Potomac Nationals of the Class A-Advanced Carolina League, where the average player was three years older than him. After the season, the Nationals assigned Severino to the Arizona Fall League.

In 2015, Severino played for the Harrisburg Senators of the Class AA Eastern League. The Nationals promoted him to the major leagues on September 1, 2015. He made his major league debut on September 20, hitting a double against the outfield wall off Miami Marlins reliever Jose Urena in his first plate appearance and coming around to score.

Severino began the 2016 season as the primary catcher for the Syracuse Chiefs in the Class AAA International League. He was called up to the majors in April 2016 for a brief stint after Wilson Ramos was placed on the bereavement list and again in July after Jose Lobaton was sent to the disabled list with an injury. He hit his first major league home run while pinch-hitting at Coors Field on August 17 against Colorado Rockies reliever Matt Carasiti. He finished his rookie season with a .321/.441/.607 batting line across 16 major league games.

In 2017 for the Nationals, Severino appeared in 17 games, but struggled to a batting line of 172/.226/.207. He fared better with the Low-A Auburn Doubledays and Triple-A Syracuse, batting a combined .248/.297/.342 with five home runs and 29 runs batted in (RBIs) between the two teams. In 2018, Severino played in 70 games for Washington, slashing .269/.294/.462 with career-highs in home runs (2) and RBIs (15). Severino was designated for assignment by Washington on March 21, 2019.

=== Baltimore Orioles ===
Severino was claimed off waivers by the Baltimore Orioles on March 23, 2019. He became the team's starting catcher when Jesús Sucre was designated for assignment on April 28, 2019. He set a career high with three home runs in a game in a 12–11 win over the Texas Rangers at Globe Life Park in Arlington on June 4, 2019.

In 2020 for the Orioles, Severino slashed .250/.322/.388 with 5 home runs and 21 RBIs. He had the slowest home run trot of all major league players, at 28 seconds.

Severino caught John Means' no-hitter against the Seattle Mariners on May 5, 2021. The only baserunner was on a dropped third strike by Pedro, the first time a perfect game has been lost in such a way. Severino played in 113 games for the Orioles in 2021, hitting .248 with 11 home runs and 46 RBIs. On November 3, 2021, the Orioles outrighted Severino to the Triple-A Norfolk Tides. However, he rejected this, making him a free agent.

=== Milwaukee Brewers ===
On November 21, 2021, the Milwaukee Brewers signed Severino to a one-year contract for $1.9 million. On April 4, 2022, Severino was suspended for 80 games after testing positive for Clomiphene, which was a violation of MLB's performance-enhancing drugs policy. He returned to the Brewers on July 3. Severino batted 4-for-18 (.222) in eight games before he was designated for assignment by the Brewers on August 3. He cleared waivers and was sent outright to the Triple-A Nashville Sounds on August 5. Severino elected free agency following the season on October 6.

=== San Diego Padres ===
On December 15, 2022, Severino signed a minor league deal with the San Diego Padres organization. He began the 2023 season with the Triple-A El Paso Chihuahuas, where he played in 18 games and hit .286/.400/.476 with 3 home runs, 8 RBI, and 3 stolen bases. On May 17, 2023, Severino requested and was granted his release by the Padres.

=== Seattle Mariners ===
On May 23, 2023, Severino signed a minor league contract with the Seattle Mariners. In 46 games for the Triple–A Tacoma Rainiers, he batted .230/.287/.399 with seven home runs and 28 RBI. Severino elected free agency following the season on November 6.

=== Sultanes de Monterrey ===
On February 17, 2025, Severino signed with the Sultanes de Monterrey of the Mexican League. He spent the entire season on the reserve list and did not appear in a game for Monterrey.
