= 2019 Los Angeles Dodgers season =

2019 Los Angeles Dodgers
- National League West champions
- League: National League
- Division: West
- Ballpark: Dodger Stadium
- City: Los Angeles, California
- Record: 106–56 (.654)
- Divisional place: 1st
- Owners: Guggenheim Baseball Management
- President: Stan Kasten
- President of baseball operations: Andrew Friedman
- Managers: Dave Roberts
- Television: Spectrum SportsNet LA; KTLA 5 (occasional simulcasts) (Joe Davis, Tim Neverett, Orel Hershiser, Nomar Garciaparra) (Spanish audio feed) (Pepe Yñiguez, Fernando Valenzuela, Manny Mota)
- Radio: KLAC-AM; Los Angeles Dodgers Radio Network (Charley Steiner, Tim Neverett, Rick Monday); KTNQ (Jaime Jarrín, Jorge Jarrin)

The 2019 Los Angeles Dodgers season was the 130th season for the franchise in Major League Baseball, and their 62nd season in Los Angeles, California. They played their home games at Dodger Stadium. On September 4, the Dodgers broke the National League record for most home runs in a season with their 250th home run, breaking the old mark set by the 2000 Houston Astros. The record would later be broken by the 2023 Atlanta Braves. The Dodgers became the first team to clinch a playoff berth by winning their seventh straight National League West title on September 10, the earliest they had clinched in franchise history. They finished the regular season with a record of 106–56, breaking the franchise record for wins in a season previously held by the 1953 Dodgers. Their 106–56 record was the second best in the MLB, just one game less than the Houston Astros who had a record of 107–55. The Dodgers lost to the eventual World Series champion Washington Nationals in the NLDS in five games, ending their streak of three straight NLCS appearances. With the Nationals going on to win the World Series, the Dodgers became the second franchise to be eliminated by the eventual World Series champions in four consecutive postseasons, with the New York Yankees from 2001 to 2004 being the first.

== Offseason ==
=== Front Office / Coaching staff ===
Third base coach Chris Woodward left his position with the Dodgers after the 2018 season to become the Manager of the Texas Rangers and shortly afterwards hitting coach Turner Ward left the team to take on a similar position with the Cincinnati Reds. Assistant hitting coach Luis Ortiz also left the team to take on a role as hitting coach for the Texas Rangers.

On November 6, general manager Farhan Zaidi left the Dodgers to become the President of Baseball Operations for the San Francisco Giants.

On November 28, the Dodgers finalized their coaching staff. They named Dino Ebel as the new third base coach, Robert Van Scoyoc as the hitting coach, Aaron Bates as assistant hitting coach and Chris Gimenez as game planning coach. They also promoted Brant Brown to the new position of hitting strategist. On December 3, they agreed to a four-year contract extension with manager Dave Roberts, running through the 2022 season.

The Dodgers announced in December that they would not be hiring a new general manager during the off-season, though they did hire Jeff Kingston to be Assistant general manager.

In March they promoted Brandon Gomes to also be an assistant GM and Will Rhymes to Gomes old position as Director of Player Development.

=== Broadcast team ===
On December 17, 2018, the Dodgers announced that Tim Neverett would be joining the broadcast team. He would work select television and radio games in place of Charley Steiner who had chosen to scale back his work schedule. In addition, Kevin Kennedy would be leaving his part-time role with the team.

=== Roster departures ===
On October 29, 2018, the day after the Dodgers season ended with a World Series loss, seven players became free agents. They included pitchers John Axford, Daniel Hudson, Ryan Madson and Hyun-jin Ryu, catcher Yasmani Grandal and infielders Brian Dozier and Manny Machado. In addition, second baseman Chase Utley, who had one more year remaining on his contract, retired. Ryu accepted the Dodgers $17.9 million qualifying offer and remained with the team for 2019. On November 20, the Dodgers released RHP Tom Koehler and designated LHP Zac Rosscup, RHP Erik Goeddel and IF/OF Tim Locastro for assignment. Switch Pitcher Pat Venditte was designated for assignment on November 28.

=== Trades ===
On November 28, the Dodgers acquired left-handed pitcher Adam McCreery from the Atlanta Braves for cash. On December 21, 2018, the Dodgers traded outfielders Matt Kemp and Yasiel Puig, left-handed pitcher Alex Wood, catcher/infielder Kyle Farmer and cash considerations to the Cincinnati Reds in exchange for right-handed pitcher Homer Bailey and two minor leaguers, Jeter Downs and Josiah Gray. They released Bailey the same day. On January 11, the Dodgers acquired catcher Russell Martin from the Toronto Blue Jays in exchange for minor league prospects Andrew Sopko and Ronny Brito. The Blue Jays also sent cash to the Dodgers in the deal.

=== Signings ===
On November 1, 2018, the Dodgers bought out corner infielder David Freese's 2019 option for $500,000 and then re-signed him for one year and $4.5 million. The following day, they reached a deal with starting pitcher Clayton Kershaw, to avoid him opting out of his previous deal they agreed to a three-year, $93 million contract. This agreement extends his previous contract by one year and $28 million. On December 21, the Dodgers announced that they had signed right-handed pitcher Joe Kelly to a three-year, $27 million contract, which included an option for a fourth year. On January 26, 2019, the Dodgers signed outfielder A. J. Pollock to a four-year, $55 million contract that included a player option for a fifth year.

Off-season 40-man roster moves

Departing Player	Date	Transaction	New Team	Arriving player	Old team	Date	Transaction
John Axford	October 29	Free agent	Toronto Blue Jays	Yadier Álvarez	Tulsa Drillers	November 20	Added to 40-man roster
Brian Dozier	October 29	Free agent	Washington Nationals	Matt Beaty	Oklahoma City Dodgers	November 20	Added to 40-man roster
Yasmani Grandal	October 29	Free agent	Milwaukee Brewers	Edwin Ríos	Oklahoma City Dodgers	November 20	Added to 40-man roster
Daniel Hudson	October 29	Free agent	Los Angeles Angels	Josh Sborz	Oklahoma City Dodgers	November 20	Added to 40-man roster
Manny Machado	October 29	Free agent	San Diego Padres	Keibert Ruiz	Tulsa Drillers	November 20	Added to 40-man roster
Ryan Madson	October 29	Free agent	Did not sign	Adam McCreery	Atlanta Braves	November 28	Trade
Chase Utley	October 29	Retirement	N/A	Joe Kelly	Boston Red Sox	December 21	Free agent signing
Erik Goeddel	November 20	Designated for Assignment	Did not sign	Homer Bailey	Cincinnati Reds	December 21	Trade
Tom Koehler	November 20	Released	Pittsburgh Pirates	Jaime Schultz	Tampa Bay Rays	January 8	Trade
Tim Locastro	November 20	Designated for Assignment	New York Yankees	Russell Martin	Toronto Blue Jays	January 11	Trade
Zac Rosscup	November 20	Designated for Assignment	Seattle Mariners	A. J. Pollock	Arizona Diamondbacks	January 26	Free agent signing
Pat Venditte	November 28	Designated for Assignment	San Francisco Giants				
Kyle Farmer	December 21	Trade	Cincinnati Reds				
Matt Kemp	December 21	Trade	Cincinnati Reds				
Yasiel Puig	December 21	Trade	Cincinnati Reds				
Alex Wood	December 21	Trade	Cincinnati Reds				
Homer Bailey	December 21	Released	Kansas City Royals				

== Spring training ==
The Dodgers began spring training on February 12, 2019, when pitchers and catchers reported to camp at Camelback Ranch in Glendale, Arizona. On March 10, the Dodgers released right-handed relief pitcher Josh Fields when they claimed left-handed pitcher Donnie Hart off waivers from the Baltimore Orioles. Clayton Kershaw was expected to be the Dodgers opening day starter for a ninth straight season, but he experienced shoulder inflammation early in camp which kept him from pitching in spring training games and led to him beginning the season on the injured list. Near the end of spring training, Rich Hill came down with a strained MCL, leading to the Dodgers announcing that Hyun-jin Ryu would start on opening day and that Ross Stripling would also begin the season in the rotation.

== Season standings ==
=== National League West ===
NL West
Team	W	L	Pct.	GB	Home	Road
Los Angeles Dodgers	106	56	.654	—	59‍–‍22	47‍–‍34
Arizona Diamondbacks	85	77	.525	21	44‍–‍37	41‍–‍40
San Francisco Giants	77	85	.475	29	35‍–‍46	42‍–‍39
Colorado Rockies	71	91	.438	35	43‍–‍38	28‍–‍53
San Diego Padres	70	92	.432	36	36‍–‍45	34‍–‍47

=== National League Wild Card ===
Wild Card standings

Division leaders
Team	W	L	Pct.
Los Angeles Dodgers	106	56	.654
Atlanta Braves	97	65	.599
St. Louis Cardinals	91	71	.562

Wild Card teams (Top 2 teams qualify for postseason)
Team	W	L	Pct.	GB
Washington Nationals	93	69	.574	+4
Milwaukee Brewers	89	73	.549	—
New York Mets	86	76	.531	3
Arizona Diamondbacks	85	77	.525	4
Chicago Cubs	84	78	.519	5
Philadelphia Phillies	81	81	.500	8
San Francisco Giants	77	85	.475	12
Cincinnati Reds	75	87	.463	14
Colorado Rockies	71	91	.438	18
San Diego Padres	70	92	.432	19
Pittsburgh Pirates	69	93	.426	20
Miami Marlins	57	105	.352	32

=== Record vs. opponents ===
NL Records

2019 National League record Source: MLB Standings Grid – 2019
Team	AZ	ATL	CHC	CIN	COL	LAD	MIA	MIL	NYM	PHI	PIT	SD	SF	STL	WSH	AL
Arizona	—	4–3	2–4	3–3	9–10	8–11	3–4	2–5	2–5	4–2	6–1	11–8	10–9	3–3	4–3	14–6
Atlanta	3–4	—	5–2	3–4	3–3	2–4	15–4	3–3	11–8	9–10	5–2	5–2	5–2	4–2	11–8	13–7
Chicago	4–2	2–5	—	8–11	3–3	3–4	6–1	9–10	5–2	2–5	11–8	4–3	4–2	9–10	2–4	12–8
Cincinnati	3–3	4–3	11–8	—	3–3	1–5	6–1	8–11	3–4	3–4	7–12	5–2	4–3	7–12	1–5	9–11
Colorado	10–9	3–3	3–3	3–3	—	4–15	5–2	5–2	2–4	3–4	2–5	11–8	7–12	2–5	3–4	8–12
Los Angeles	11–8	4–2	4–3	5–1	15–4	—	5–1	4–3	5–2	5–2	6–0	13–6	12–7	3–4	4–3	10–10
Miami	4–3	4–15	1–6	1–6	2–5	1–5	—	2–5	6–13	10–9	3–3	4–2	3–3	3–4	4–15	9–11
Milwaukee	5–2	3–3	10–9	11–8	2–5	3–4	5–2	—	5–1	4–3	15–4	3–4	2–4	9–10	4–2	8–12
New York	5–2	8–11	2–5	4–3	4–2	2–5	13–6	1–5	—	7–12	5–1	3–3	3–4	2–5	12–7	15–5
Philadelphia	2–4	10–9	5–2	4–3	4–3	2–5	9–10	3–4	12–7	—	4–2	3–3	3–4	4–2	5–14	11–9
Pittsburgh	1–6	2–5	8–11	12–7	5–2	0–6	3–3	4–15	1–5	2–4	—	6–1	5–2	5–14	3–4	12–8
San Diego	8–11	2–5	3–4	2–5	8–11	6–13	2–4	4–3	3–3	3–3	1–6	—	9–10	4–2	4–3	11–9
San Francisco	9–10	2–5	2–4	3–4	12–7	7–12	3–3	4–2	4–3	4–3	2–5	10–9	—	3–4	1–5	11–9
St. Louis	3–3	2–4	10–9	12–7	5–2	4–3	4–3	10–9	5–2	2–4	14–5	2–4	4–3	—	5–2	9–11
Washington	3–4	8–11	4–2	5–1	4–3	3–4	15–4	2–4	7–12	14–5	4–3	3–4	5–1	2–5	—	14–6

== Regular season ==
Opening Day starters
Name	Position
Joc Pederson	Left fielder
Corey Seager	Shortstop
Justin Turner	Third baseman
Max Muncy	First baseman
A. J. Pollock	Center fielder
Cody Bellinger	Right fielder
Kiké Hernández	Second baseman
Austin Barnes	Catcher
Hyun-jin Ryu	Starting pitcher

=== March ===
The season began on March 28 with a home series against the Arizona Diamondbacks. Hyun-Jin Ryu made the Opening Day start and allowed only one run while striking out eight in six innings. Meanwhile, the Dodgers offense hit an MLB opening day record eight home runs, with two each by Joc Pederson and Enrique Hernández. The Dodgers began the season with a 12–5 victory. In the second game, Ross Stripling struck out five over five scoreless innings and A. J. Pollock had four hits, including a double and a homer, as the Dodgers jumped out to a 3–0 lead. However, reliever Joe Kelly allowed a three-run homer to Christian Walker in the seventh and the game went into extra innings where the Diamondbacks won 5–4 thanks to a game-winning hit by Carson Kelly in the 13th inning. The Dodgers hit four more home runs in the third game of the season, including two by Cody Bellinger, as they routed the Diamondbacks, 18–5. Kenta Maeda in his debut, allowed three solo homers in 6 2/3 innings for the win. It was the first game in Dodger Stadium where both lead-off hitters (Joc Pederson for the Dodgers and Jarrod Dyson for the Diamondbacks) hit home runs in their first at-bats. Walker Buehler struggled in his debut, allowing five runs on five hits without striking anyone out in only three innings on March 31, but a two-run double by Pollock in the eighth helped the Dodgers come from behind to win 8–7. The 43-run total was a club record for a four-game series.

=== April ===
Julio Urías got the start on April 1 in the opener of a three-game series against the San Francisco Giants. He struck out seven while allowing only three hits in five scoreless innings. However, Joe Kelly allowed four runs on four hits in 1 2/3 innings and the Giants won 4–2. Ryu struck out five and allowed two runs in seven innings in the next game while Cody Bellinger hit a grand slam home run and the Dodgers won 6–5. They hit at least one home run in each of their first six games, matching the franchise record set in 1954. They broke that record when Enrique Hernández homered in the next game, and then a two-run double by David Freese helped the Dodgers to a 5–3 comeback victory over the Giants to end the homestand.

On April 5, the Dodgers began their first road trip of the season with a trip to Coors Field to play the Colorado Rockies. Bellinger hit a three-run homer in the Dodgers 10–6 win in the opener. He set Dodgers franchise records with six homers and 16 RBI through the first eight games of the season and became only the third player in MLB history to accomplish that, joining Eddie Mathews (1954) and Alex Rodriguez (2007). Alex Verdugo homered and tripled as the Dodgers took the next game, 7–2. Bellinger hit his seventh home run as the Dodgers finished off a sweep of the Rockies with a 12–6 win. The Dodgers scored 84 runs in their first 10 games, the third most in MLB history behind only the 1932 Yankees and the 1999 Indians. The Dodgers next traveled to Busch Stadium for a four-game series against the St. Louis Cardinals. They lost the opener 4–3 as their five-game winning streak and 10 game homer streak both came to an end. In the following game the team was hitless in nine at-bats with runners in scoring position, stranding 13 base runners in a 4–0 shutout loss. Joc Pederson and Max Muncy hit back-to-back home runs on April 10 but those were the only runs the Dodgers scored in a 7–2 loss to the Cardinals. The Cardinals finished off their first four-game sweep of the Dodgers since 2010 with an 11–7 win in the finale.

The Dodgers returned home on April 12 to face the Milwaukee Brewers. Former Dodger Yasmani Grandal had three hits, including a two-run homer as the Brewers took game one, 8–5. Zach Davies shut down the Dodgers in the next game, striking out six in seven innings as the Brewers won 4–1. The Dodgers six-game losing streak came to an end on April 14, when Ross Stripling allowed only one run on four hits in eight innings and they beat the Brewers 7–1. Clayton Kershaw made his 2019 debut the following day in the opener of a three-game series against the Cincinnati Reds. He allowed two runs (on a two-run first inning homer by former Dodger Yasiel Puig) in seven innings, and the Dodgers won 4–3 on a two-run walk-off homer by Joc Pederson. They won the next game too, 6–1, thanks to Alex Verdugo, who had three hits and three RBI in the game. They finished off the sweep of the Reds with a 3–2 victory on April 17. A three-run home run by A. J. Pollock accounted for all the Dodgers scoring. They also tied an MLB record with the 32nd consecutive home game with a home run, matching the 1999 Colorado Rockies.

The Dodgers next traveled to begin a series with the Brewers at Miller Park. Julio Urías struck out nine in six scoreless innings while Cody Bellinger and Max Muncy homered in the 3–1 win in the series opener. Enrique Hernández hit a three-run homer in the next game as the Dodgers came from behind to win 5–3. Christian Yelich hit two home runs in the next game as the Brewers snapped the Dodgers' six-game winning streak with a 5–0 shutout win. The Dodgers wrapped up the series with a 6–5 victory. Pederson hit two homers and Bellinger added a go-ahead homer in the ninth inning for the win. The Dodgers lost to the Chicago Cubs in the opener of a three-game series at Wrigley Field on April 23, 7–2. A pair of three-run home runs, by Javier Báez and Jason Heyward, in the sixth inning gave the Cubs a 7–6 win over the Dodgers in the second game of the series. The Dodgers did take the last game of the series, 2–1.

The Dodgers returned home on April 26 to play the Pittsburgh Pirates and won the opener, 6–2. Austin Barnes homered, doubled, and drove in three runs in the game while Hyun-jin Ryu struck out 10 in seven innings. Bellinger hit his 13th homer in the game to set a new MLB record with 88 total bases before the month of May. In the next game, Clayton Kershaw struck out eight in seven innings and picked up his first win of the season when Pederson's two-run triple in the seventh inning led the Dodgers to a 3–1 comeback victory. Despite the win, the Dodgers failed to homer in the game, snapping their 33-game home streak. Rich Hill made his season debut on April 28, allowing five runs in six innings. Bellinger hit his 14th home run of the season and drove in three runs as the Dodgers came from behind to win, 7–6 to complete the sweep.

The Dodgers traveled to Oracle Park on April 29 to play the Giants and lost the opening game 3–2 thanks to a three-run double by Evan Longoria in the seventh inning. They finished off the month with a 10–3 win and became the first team in the majors to reach 20 wins.

=== May ===
Madison Bumgarner struck out six in eight innings while only allowing one run on four hits as the Giants beat the Dodgers 2–1 on May 1. The Dodgers won their next game, 4–3, over the San Diego Padres at Petco Park. A three-run home run by Max Muncy led to a 5-run sixth inning as the Dodgers came from behind to win 7–6 the next day. Hunter Renfroe hit a pinch-hit grand slam off Kenley Jansen to give the Padres an 8–5 win in the series finale.

The Dodgers returned home on May 6 and beat the Atlanta Braves, 5–3. Walker Buehler struck out eight in seven innings in the win. In the next game, Hyun-jin Ryu pitched a four hit, complete game, shutout and Justin Turner hit three home runs and drove in six RBI in a 9–0 rout. The Dodgers hit three home runs in the following game, a 9–4 win, and finished off a three-game sweep of the Braves. They next split a four-game series with the Washington Nationals. In the first game they were shutout 6–0 as Patrick Corbin struck out eight in seven innings. They returned the favor by shutting out the Nationals, 5–0, the next day. Joc Pederson hit two homers in the game. In the third game, Buehler struck out seven in seven scoreless innings but a grand slam homer by Gerardo Parra off reliever Dylan Floro in the eighth led the Nationals to a 5–2 win. Ryu took a no-hitter into the eighth inning in the next game, while striking out nine and Corey Seager hit a grand slam as the Dodgers won 6–0. The Dodgers beat the Padres 6–3 on May 14 as Pederson and Cody Bellinger both homered. Kenta Maeda struck out 12 batters in 6 2/3 scoreless innings while only allowing three hits and also singled in both of the Dodgers runs as they beat the Padres 2–0.

The Dodgers next began a three-game series against the Cincinnati Reds at Great American Ballpark. Rich Hill became the oldest Dodgers pitcher since Dazzy Vance to strike out 10 or more batters in game when he pitched six scoreless innings and the Dodgers hit four homers in a 6–0 win. The Dodgers managed just two hits in the next game, as the Reds shut them out 4–0. The Dodgers took the final game of the series, 8–3. Ryu extended his scoreless streak to 31 innings as he struck out five in seven innings. Clayton Kershaw struck out eight in 6 1/3 innings and extended his unbeaten streak to 19 consecutive starts as the Dodgers beat the Tampa Bay Rays, 7–3, at Tropicana Field. In the following game, Hill allowed one run in six innings with seven strikeouts but the Rays erupted for seven runs, including a three-run homer by Avisaíl García in the seventh inning off the Dodgers bullpen en route to an 8–1 win. A grand slam home run by David Freese in the first inning, helped power the Dodgers to a 10–2 rout of the Pittsburgh Pirates at PNC Park on May 24. Ryu's scoreless streak came to an end in the second inning of the next game, but the Dodgers still won, 7–2. Justin Turner reached base all six times he came up in the next game, with a walk and five hits as the Dodgers finished off a sweep of the Pirates with an 11–7 win.

The Dodgers returned home on Memorial Day to play the New York Mets in a four-game series. In the first game, Bellinger homered and had two outfield assists in a 9–5 win. In the following game, a grand slam by Michael Conforto in the 7th inning lifted the Mets to a 7–3 win. In the third game, the Dodgers came from behind to score four-runs, including back-to-back homers by Pederson and Muncy, off Mets closer Edwin Díaz in the ninth inning to win 9–8. In the series finale, Ryu and Kenley Jansen combined for nine strikeouts with only four hits as the Dodgers shut out the Mets 2–0. The Dodgers slugged four homers to end the month of May with a 6–3 victory over the Philadelphia Phillies.

=== June ===
Will Smith hit a walk-off homer (his first homer of his career) as the Dodgers beat the Phillies, 4–3, on June 1. Rich Hill struck out nine batters while only allowing three hits in seven scoreless innings while Joc Pederson and David Freese homered as the Dodgers finished off their sweep of the Phillies with an 8–0 win.

The Dodgers began their next road trip at Chase Field against the Arizona Diamondbacks. Walker Buehler struck out 11 while allowing only one run on two hits in eight innings while Corey Seager hit a three-run homer as they won 3–1. In the next game, Hyun-jin Ryu allowed only three hits in seven scoreless innings to pick up his ninth win in the Dodgers 9–0 victory. A walk-off hit by David Peralta in the 11th inning gave the Diamondbacks a 3–2 win in the series finale. The Dodgers then dropped a 2–1 game to the San Francisco Giants at Oracle Park on June 7. Corey Seager had four hits and four RBI as the Dodgers picked up a 7–2 win. The next game was a pitching duel between Buehler and Madison Bumgarner with the only run scored a solo homer by Max Muncy of Bumgarner in the first inning. They next traveled to Angel Stadium for a quick two-game series with the Los Angeles Angels. The Dodgers took the lead in the first game but the Angels tied it up with a two-run homer by Mike Trout and then pulled ahead to win 5–3. The Angels also won by the same score in the following game thanks to a four-run first inning highlighted by a solo homer by Shohei Ohtani and a three-run homer by Justin Bour.

After an off-day, the Dodgers returned home for a four-game series with the Chicago Cubs. Prior to the series they learned that Seager would be out for the next month with a hamstring injury. The Dodgers hit four home runs in the opener, including two by Cody Bellinger, en route to a 7–3 win. Justin Turner hit his 100th career homer in the next game as the Dodgers won 5–3. In the third game of the series, Buehler allowed only two hits in seven scoreless innings but the Dodgers lost 2–1 when Anthony Rizzo hit a two-run home run off Kenley Jansen in the ninth inning. They won the next game 3–2 thanks to another strong outing by Ryu, a home run by Bellinger, and a go-ahead RBI single by Russell Martin in the eighth. The Giants next came to town for another four-game series. The Dodgers were only able to score one run off Giants starter Tyler Beede, who picked up his first major league win as the Giants won 3–2 in the series opener. In the following game, Clayton Kershaw pitched seven shutout innings while only allowing three hits and the Dodgers jumped on the Giants to win 9–0. Enrique Hernández hit a grand slam in the seventh inning. On June 19, the Dodgers became the first team in the majors to win 50 games thanks to a 9–2 win. Chris Taylor hit two homers, doubled, and drove in four runs. In the series finale, the Dodgers jumped out to a 7–1 lead thanks to three home runs only to hold on for a 9–8 win when the Giants scored four runs in the ninth inning off the bullpen. The Colorado Rockies were the next team to visit Dodger Stadium, for a three-game weekend series. Walker Buehler pitched his first career complete game, allowing only three hits and two runs (on two solo homers) while striking out a personal best 16 batters. The Dodgers won the game, 4–2, on a walk-off two-run home run by Matt Beaty. The Dodgers won the following day, 5–4, on another walk-off homer, this time by Alex Verdugo in the 11th inning. The Dodgers made it three straight games with walk-off homers by rookies when Will Smith hit a three-run homer on June 23 to give the Dodgers a 6–3 win and a sweep of the Rockies.

After the long home stand, the Dodgers went on the road on June 24, beginning with a series at Chase Field against the Diamondbacks. The game was tied at four heading into the bottom of the eighth, when the Diamondbacks scored four runs off of Dylan Floro to end the Dodgers winning streak, 8–5. The Dodgers picked up their 55th win the next day, with a 3–2 win, matching the best start in Los Angeles franchise history. In the final game of the series, the Dodgers started Tony Gonsolin, who was making his MLB debut. He allowed four runs in the first inning without recording an out and six total in his four innings of work as the Diamondbacks routed the Dodgers 8–2 for the series win. Next the Dodgers began a four-game series at Coors Field against the Rockies by winning a 12–8 contest. The Dodgers hit six home runs in the game, including two by Max Muncy. However, in the next game, the Rockies erupted for eight runs in the fifth inning to beat the Dodgers, 13–9, for their first win against them in more than nine months. They beat them again the following day, 5–3, as Jon Gray quieted the Dodgers bats. The bats came back alive in the next game, breaking out with a six-run sixth inning, to finish a series split with a 10–5 win.

=== July ===
The Dodgers returned home on July 2 for a quick two-game series with the Arizona Diamondbacks. The Dodgers trailed by a run and were down to their last out in the first game when Diamondbacks closer Greg Holland lost control and walked four straight batters to tie the game. T. J. McFarland then came in and walked Cody Bellinger to give the Dodgers a 5–4 win. It was the first time a major league game had ended on five straight walks and the first time in team history the Dodgers had won four straight home games on walk-offs. They picked up their fifth straight walk off win the next day when Bellinger homered in the 10th inning (his second homer of the game) to give the Dodgers another 5–4 win and complete the sweep. They became the first team since the 2004 Oakland Athletics with five straight home walk offs and Bellinger set a new Dodgers franchise record with his 29th home run before the All-Star break. The Dodgers welcomed the San Diego Padres for a four-game series and took the series opener 5–1 behind home runs from Max Muncy and Bellinger and six scoreless innings from Hyun-Jin Ryu. Clayton Kershaw struck out nine in seven innings while only allowing two runs but the Padres beat the Dodgers, 3–2, on a solo homer by Hunter Renfroe in the eighth inning. The loss snapped a nine-game winning streak by the Dodgers at home The Padres won again the next night, as Renfroe and Manuel Margot homered in their 3–1 win. Fernando Tatís Jr. homered twice in the next game as the Padres took the series with a 5–3 win. Despite the loss, the first time all season they had lost three straight at home, the Dodgers headed into the All-Star break with a 13 1/2 game lead in the division and the best record in baseball.

At the 2019 Major League Baseball All-Star Game, Joc Pederson participated in the Home Run Derby, losing to Vladimir Guerrero Jr. in a semi-final match that went to a swing-off tie-breaker. Kershaw, Ryu, Bellinger, Muncy and Walker Buehler represented the Dodgers in the All-Star Game.

The Dodgers opened the second half of the season at Fenway Park in a World Series rematch against the Boston Red Sox. Eduardo Rodríguez struck out 10 batters while shutting down the Dodgers offense while a three-run homer by Xander Bogaerts ignited a five-run seventh inning that allowed the Red Sox to pull away for an 8–1 win. The Dodgers snapped their four-game losing streak the next game thanks to four home runs, including one by A. J. Pollock who rejoined the roster after having been on the injured list since April. The Dodgers won 11–2. The Dodgers took the final game of the series, 7–4, in 12 innings. The team next traveled to Citizens Bank Park to begin a four-game series with the Philadelphia Phillies. They routed the Phillies 16–2 in the series opener behind four home runs, including two from Bellinger. Kershaw allowed one run in six innings, striking out seven batters in the game. The following game, the Phillies jumped out to an early 6–1 lead thanks to three homers and a pair of Dodgers errors but the Dodgers fought back thanks to five homers of their own to take the lead into the ninth only for the Phillies to score three runs off of Kenley Jansen and beat the Dodgers, 9–8, on a walk-off double by Bryce Harper. In game three of the series, the Dodgers sat through a two-hour and 37-minute rain delay in the top of the third to win 7–2 behind two 2-run homers by David Freese and Justin Turner. In the final game of the series, Enrique Hernández hit two homers with four RBIs but the Dodgers bullpen allowed four runs in the seventh inning and the Phillies came from behind again to win 7–6 and split the series.

After a 4–3 road trip, the Dodgers returned home to start a five-game homestand, beginning with a three-game series against the Miami Marlins. Ryu allowed one run in seven innings, striking out seven batters, in the first game as the Dodgers won 2–1. In the next game, Kershaw allowed only two hits and one walk while striking out 10 in six scoreless innings as the Dodgers jumped out to a 6–1 lead. However, the bullpen again faltered, giving up five runs in the top of the eighth inning. The Dodgers rebounded with a three-run homer by Matt Beaty in the bottom of the inning and won the game, 10–6. The Dodgers routed the Marlins 9–0 to finish off a series sweep. Muncy, Pederson and Pollock homered and Buehler pitched seven scoreless innings, striking out eleven batters. The Dodgers finished up the homestand by being swept in a quick two-game series by the Los Angeles Angels. Mike Trout homered and threw out Max Muncy at the plate in the Angels 5–4 win in the first game while Kole Calhoun homered and doubled twice in the Angels 3–2 win in the second game. By winning all four games between the two teams on the season, the Angels swept the Freeway Series for the first time since Interleague play began in 1997.

On July 26, the Dodgers began a three-game weekend series against the Washington Nationals at Nationals Park. They won the series opener 4–2 on a go-ahead three-run homer by Justin Turner. Ryu allowed one run on 6 2/3 innings, striking out four. The Dodgers won the next game, 9–3. Will Smith had three hits, a home run and two doubles, and drove in six RBI, the most RBI in a game by a Dodger rookie since James Loney in 2006. The Nationals broke out in the series finale to win 11–4, thanks partly to some sloppy defense by the Dodgers. That trend would continue at Coors Field in the series opener against the Colorado Rockies with the Dodgers losing 9–1. They bounced back to win the second game of the series 9–4 behind home runs from Pollock, Turner, Russell Martin and newly acquired Kristopher Negrón. Tony Gonsolin recorded a four inning save in his second major league game. In the series finale, Ryu pitched six scoreless innings, striking out one batter and giving up three hits. Will Smith broke open a scoreless game with a three-run homer in the ninth inning and Negrón added a two-run homer as the Dodgers won 5–1.

=== August ===
The Dodgers began August with a 10-game homestand, starting with a four-game series with the San Diego Padres. In the series opener, Will Smith hit a go-ahead grand slam in the sixth inning and they cruised to an 8–2 victory. The Dodgers top pitching prospect, Dustin May, made his debut in the next game. He pitched well until running out of steam in the sixth inning and surrendering the lead. Overall he pitched 5 2/3 innings, allowing four runs (three earned) on nine hits with three strikeouts as the Dodgers lost the game 5–2. In the next game, Walker Buehler pitched a complete game, allowing only a home run by Manuel Margot while striking out 15 batters as the Dodgers won 4–1. Buehler became only the third pitcher in MLB history with multiple starts of at least 15 strikeouts and no walks in the same season. In the series finale, Max Muncy hit a walk-off double for the Dodgers 11–10 win.

The Dodgers continued their homestand with a three-game series with the St. Louis Cardinals. In the series opener, the Dodgers routed the Cardinals 8–0 behind six scoreless innings from Tony Gonsolin, who got his first major league win, as well as home runs from Cody Bellinger and Joc Pederson. In the second game of the series, the Dodgers edged the Cardinals 3–1 behind Clayton Kershaw, who pitched seven innings, allowing one run and one walk while striking out nine batters. In the series finale, May struck out seven in 5 2/3 innings while only allowing one run, but the Cardinals starter Jack Flaherty only gave up four hits while striking out 10 in seven scoreless innings. The Dodgers came from behind to win 2–1 on a walk-off two-run single by Russell Martin. After an off-day, the Dodgers took on the Arizona Diamondbacks for three games. Buehler shut them out for six innings with eight strikeouts and the Dodgers had a 2–0 lead going into the ninth when Carson Kelly hit a two-run homer off Kenley Jansen to tie the game. Kelly hit another homer in the 11th to give the Diamondbacks a 3–2 win. Kenta Maeda pitched seven scoreless innings in the next game, with six strikeouts, and picked up his first win since May 31 in the Dodgers' 4–0 victory. Hyun-jin Ryu returned after a brief stay on the injured list to pitch seven scoreless innings and Justin Turner homered twice as the Dodgers wrapped up the homestand with a 9–3 win.

On August 13, the Dodgers began a six-game road trip, starting with a three-game series at Marlins Park against the Miami Marlins. The Dodgers recorded 13 extra base hits in the opener (matching a franchise record set on September 18, 2006), including two homers by Will Smith and three doubles by A. J. Pollock, as they rolled to a 15–1 victory. Dustin May recorded his first major league win. In the following game, Kershaw allowed only two hits in seven shutout innings, with 10 strikeouts as the Dodgers won 9–1, with Kershaw tying Sandy Koufax for most career wins by a Dodger left-handed pitcher (165). Edwin Ríos hit his first two major-league home runs in the game. Bellinger hit his 40th home run of the season in the series finale, becoming the youngest player in Dodgers history to accomplish that feat. However, the Marlins avoided a sweep with a 13–7 win. The Dodgers hit 14 home runs in the three-game series, a franchise record. The team headed to SunTrust Park for a three-game series against the Atlanta Braves. In the series opener, the Dodgers hit four more home runs, including a go-ahead three-run home run from Max Muncy at the top of the 7th inning, to win 8–3. They set an MLB record with 22 home runs in five games. In the second game of the series, Ryu allowed go-ahead back to back home runs by Josh Donaldson and Adam Duvall in the sixth inning and the Braves came from behind to win 4–3. A go-ahead grand slam by Rafael Ortega in the sixth inning off May gave the Braves another come-from-behind win, 5–3.

The Dodgers returned home on August 20 for a three-game interleague series with the Toronto Blue Jays. In the series opener, the Dodgers routed the Blue Jays 16–3 behind five home runs. Clayton Kershaw pitched six quality innings, allowing three earned runs on three home runs (two by Bo Bichette), while striking out six batters and walking three. With his 166th career win, Kershaw passed Koufax for the most career wins by a Dodger left-hander. The Dodgers won the next game 2–1 on a walk-off home run by Muncy in the 10th inning. Walker Buehler threw seven scoreless innings, striking eight batters and giving up five hits. In the series finale, the Dodgers rallied from a two-run deficit in the 9th inning to sweep the Blue Jays 3–2 on Enrique Hernández's walk-off single. The Dodgers next welcomed the New York Yankees to town for Players Weekend, a matchup of the two teams with the best records in baseball. In the series opener, the Yankees dismantled the Dodgers 10–2 behind five home runs, including two by Didi Gregorius. Ryu was charged with seven runs in 4 2/3 innings, his worst start of the season. Justin Turner's two-run home run in the next game accounted for all the Dodgers runs in a 2–1 victory over the Yankees. In the series finale, Kershaw went seven innings, giving up three earned runs on three solo home runs to the Yankees as the Dodgers offense was quiet in a 5–1 loss.

The Dodgers headed to San Diego and Arizona for a seven-game road trip, starting with a three-game series against the Padres. In the series opener, a critical error was made by A.J. Pollock in the sixth inning that led to three Padres runs and they won 4–3. In the next game, the Dodgers rebounded to rout the Padres 9–0 behind six scoreless innings by Buehler (with 11 strikeouts) and home runs by Pederson and Pollock. In the final game of the series, the Dodgers scored two runs in the 10th inning to edge the Padres 6–4 after Kenley Jansen gave up his seventh blown save of the season. The Dodgers next traveled to Arizona to play the Diamondbacks for a four-game series. In the opener, Ryu struggled again, giving up seven earned runs as the Dodgers lost 11–5. In the next game, the Diamondbacks rallied to win 5–4 behind two two-run home runs by Eduardo Escobar and Joshua Rojas as well as a go-ahead run on a balk in the eighth inning. The Diamondbacks also won the next game, 6–5. Kershaw pitched a season low five innings, giving up five earned runs, including a go-ahead two-run double by Nick Ahmed, making it the first time he didn't complete at least six innings all season.

=== September ===
The Dodgers avoided being swept by the Diamondbacks with a 4–3 win in 11 innings to start off September behind four solo home runs, including a game-tying homer by Cody Bellinger in the ninth inning and a go-ahead homer by Joc Pederson in the 11th inning. The Dodgers broke the team record for home runs in a season, which had just been set the previous season.

The Dodgers returned home on September 2 to play the Colorado Rockies for a three-game series. They began by routing the Rockies 16–9 behind seven home runs, including two each by Pederson and Chris Taylor. Top prospect Gavin Lux was called up to make his major league debut at second base, and had two hits in five at-bats with a double and three runs scored. In the second game, the Dodgers edged the Rockies 5–3 behind a go-ahead three-run home run by Russell Martin in the 7th inning. Pederson hit two more home runs, drive in three runs, and scored three runs in the series finale as the Dodgers swept the Rockies 7–3. They broke the National League record for most home runs in a season with their 250th homer, breaking the old mark set by the 2000 Houston Astros. The record would later be broken by the 2023 Atlanta Braves. A. J. Pollock hit three home runs in the opening game of a three-game series against the San Francisco Giants. However, the Dodgers lost 5–4 as Clayton Kershaw failed to get out of the fifth inning for the first time all season. In the next game, the Giants held the Dodgers offense to only four singles and shut them out 1–0. This was the first time the Dodgers had been shutout since May and only the fourth time all season. The Dodgers wrapped up the home stand with a 5–0 shutout of the Giants on September 8, to avoid the sweep. A two-run homer by Matt Beaty and a three-run homer by Corey Seager accounted for all of the Dodgers runs.

The Dodgers next embarked on a six-game road trip, beginning with a three-game interleague series against the Baltimore Orioles. In the series opener, Seager hit two home runs and drove in five runs while Walker Buehler pitched seven scoreless innings with eleven strikeouts (giving him a career high 200 on the season) as they defeated the Orioles 7–3. With the victory, the Dodgers clinched their seventh straight National League West division title in their 146th game, the earliest in franchise history. The Dodgers lost the next game, 7–3, with the big blow being a three-run home-run by Jonathan Villar. That homer was the 6,106th of 2019, a new single-season record. In the series finale, the Dodgers scored three runs in the sixth inning, including the two go-ahead runs on a strikeout passed ball by Pedro Severino, to edge the Orioles 4–2. The Dodgers next travel to New York to play the New York Mets for three games. In the opener, Lux and Edwin Ríos hit home runs to help the Dodgers rout the Mets 9–2. The next game was a scoreless duel through seven innings between Hyun-jin Ryu and Jacob deGrom. The Mets then loaded in the bases in the eighth off of two hit batters and a walk before Rajai Davis hit a pinch hit three-run double to give the Mets the 3–0 victory. The Dodgers finished the road trip with a 3–2 victory over the Mets. An RBI single by Jedd Gyorko in the ninth inning accounted for the winning run.

The Dodgers returned home on September 17 to begin their final homestand of the regular season, starting with a brief two game interleague series with the Tampa Bay Rays. They scored five runs in the seventh inning to defeat the Rays 7–5. Corey Seager drove in four runs in the game, with two doubles. The Rays took the second game, 8–7, in eleven innings after Kenley Jansen allowed his career worst eighth blown save. The Dodgers defeated the Rockies 12–5 in their next game. They scored seven-runs in the 4th inning which included a three-run homer by A.J. Pollock. They set a new team single-season record for runs scored with 844. The Dodgers lost the next game to the Rockies, 4–2 with Ryan McMahon and Josh Fuentes hitting home runs. In the final home game of the season, the Dodgers hit four home runs to defeat the Rockies, 7–4, for their 100th win of the season. Ryu pitched seven quality innings, giving up three earned runs and striking out six batters, while hitting his first career home run and Bellinger hit his second grand slam of the season.

The Dodgers next traveled to Petco Park for a three-game series against the San Diego Padres. A grand slam by Max Muncy and a solo home run by Joc Pederson led them to a 6–3 win in the series opener, which clinched the best record in the National League. In the next game, the Dodgers hit four more home runs, including a go-ahead one by Edwin Ríos in the seventh inning, to edge the Padres in a 6–4 win. Pederson hit two home runs and drove in three runs while Jansen record his 300th career save. Kershaw pitched six scoreless innings and Muncy drove in the lone run as the Dodgers swept the Padres with a 1–0 win. The Dodgers traveled to San Francisco to conclude the regular season with a three-game series against the Giants. They scored five runs on three home runs in the second inning as they routed the Giants, 9–2, to begin the series. In the following game, Ryu struck out seven in seven scoreless innings (clinching the 2019 National League E.R.A. title with 2.32) and also drove in a run as the Dodgers won 2–0 to tie their franchise record for wins with 105 (previously set by the 1953 Brooklyn Dodgers). The Dodgers broke that record with their 9–0 win over the Giants in the regular season finale.

=== Game log ===
2019 Game Log (106–56)
March (3–1)

#	Date	Opponent	Score	Win	Loss	Save	Attendance	Record
1	March 28	Diamondbacks	**W** 12–5	**Ryu** (1–0)	Greinke (0–1)	–	53,086	1–0
2	March 29	Diamondbacks	L 4–5 (13)	Andriese (1–0)	**García** (0–1)	Holland (1)	42,266	1–1
3	March 30	Diamondbacks	**W** 18–5	**Maeda** (1–0)	Godley (0–1)	–	50,626	2–1
4	March 31	Diamondbacks	**W** 8–7	**Floro** (1–0)	Hirano (0–1)	**Jansen** (1)	43,815	3–1

April (17–11)

#	Date	Opponent	Score	Win	Loss	Save	Attendance	Record
5	April 1	Giants	L 2–4	Gott (1–0)	**Kelly** (0–1)	Smith (2)	40,477	3–2
6	April 2	Giants	**W** 6–5	**Ryu** (2–0)	Bumgarner (0–2)	**Jansen** (2)	42,887	4–2
7	April 3	Giants	**W** 5–3	**Alexander** (1–0)	Moronta (0–1)	**Jansen** (3)	51,170	5–2
8	April 5	@ Rockies	**W** 10–6	**Maeda** (2–0)	Anderson (0–2)	–	48,404	6–2
9	April 6	@ Rockies	**W** 7–2	**Buehler** (1–0)	Gray (0–2)	**Jansen** (4)	47,880	7–2
10	April 7	@ Rockies	**W** 12–6	**Kelly** (1–1)	Bettis (0–2)	–	41,232	8–2
11	April 8	@ Cardinals	L 3–4	Mikolas (1–1)	**Kelly** (1–2)	Hicks (2)	35,858	8–3
12	April 9	@ Cardinals	L 0–4	Brebbia (1–0)	**Stripling** (0–1)	–	36,353	8–4
13	April 10	@ Cardinals	L 2–7	Flaherty (1–0)	**Maeda** (2–1)	–	36,244	8–5
14	April 11	@ Cardinals	L 7–11	Gallegos (1–0)	**Báez** (0–1)	–	38,200	8–6
15	April 12	Brewers	L 5–8	Albers (1–0)	**Urías** (0–1)	–	43,643	8–7
16	April 13	Brewers	L 1–4	Davies (2–0)	**Ferguson** (0–1)	Guerra (1)	53,922	8–8
17	April 14	Brewers	**W** 7–1	**Stripling** (1–1)	Chacín (2–2)	–	45,235	9–8
18	April 15	Reds	**W** 4–3	**Jansen** (1–0)	Iglesias (0–3)	–	52,974	10–8
19	April 16	Reds	**W** 6–1	**Maeda** (3–1)	Mahle (0–1)	–	45,406	11–8
20	April 17	Reds	**W** 3–2	**Buehler** (2–0)	Gray (0–3)	**Jansen** (5)	42,691	12–8
21	April 18	@ Brewers	**W** 3–1	**Urías** (1–1)	Albers (1–1)	**Jansen** (6)	33,281	13–8
22	April 19	@ Brewers	**W** 5–3	**Báez** (1–1)	Hader (0–1)	**Jansen** (7)	36,776	14–8
23	April 20	@ Brewers	L 0–5	Anderson (2–0)	**Ryu** (2–1)	–	40,402	14–9
24	April 21	@ Brewers	**W** 6–5	**Jansen** (2–0)	Hader (0–2)	–	32,054	15–9
25	April 23	@ Cubs	L 2–7	Quintana (3–1)	**Maeda** (3–2)	–	35,536	15–10
26	April 24	@ Cubs	L 6–7	Brach (2–0)	**Alexander** (1–1)	Strop (3)	35,374	15–11
27	April 25	@ Cubs	**W** 2–1	**Báez** (2–1)	Lester (1–1)	**Jansen** (8)	35,451	16–11
28	April 26	Pirates	**W** 6–2	**Ryu** (3–1)	Archer (1–2)	–	50,748	17–11
29	April 27	Pirates	**W** 3–1	**Kershaw** (1–0)	Musgrove (1–2)	**Jansen** (9)	47,877	18–11
30	April 28	Pirates	**W** 7–6	**Urías** (2–1)	Rodríguez (0–2)	**Jansen** (10)	52,875	19–11
31	April 29	@ Giants	L 2–3	Dyson (1–0)	**Stripling** (1–2)	Smith (7)	32,212	19–12
32	April 30	@ Giants	**W** 10–3	**Buehler** (3–0)	Pomeranz (1–3)	–	32,017	20–12

May (19–7)

#	Date	Opponent	Score	Win	Loss	Save	Attendance	Record
33	May 1	@ Giants	L 1–2	Smith (1–0)	**Urías** (2–2)	–	31,969	20–13
34	May 3	@ Padres	**W** 4–3	**Alexander** (2–1)	Yates (0–1)	**Jansen** (11)	44,425	21–13
35	May 4	@ Padres	**W** 7–6	**Stripling** (2–2)	Yates (0–2)	**Jansen** (12)	44,558	22–13
36	May 5	@ Padres	L 5–8	Warren (2–0)	**Jansen** (2–1)	–	44,473	22–14
37	May 6	Braves	**W** 5–3	**Buehler** (4–0)	Gausman (1–3)	**Urías** (1)	43,393	23–14
38	May 7	Braves	**W** 9–0	**Ryu** (4–1)	Fried (4–2)	–	47,337	24–14
39	May 8	Braves	**W** 9–4	**Kershaw** (2–0)	Foltynewicz (0–2)	–	53,707	25–14
40	May 9	Nationals	L 0–6	Corbin (3–1)	**Hill** (0–1)	–	42,851	25–15
41	May 10	Nationals	**W** 5–0	**Maeda** (4–2)	Sánchez (0–6)	**Urías** (2)	43,533	26–15
42	May 11	Nationals	L 2–5	Scherzer (2–4)	**Báez** (2–2)	Doolittle (6)	53,647	26–16
43	May 12	Nationals	**W** 6–0	**Ryu** (5–1)	Strasburg (3–3)	–	45,667	27–16
44	May 14	Padres	**W** 6–3	**Kershaw** (3–0)	Paddack (3–2)	**Jansen** (13)	46,460	28–16
45	May 15	Padres	**W** 2–0	**Maeda** (5–2)	Strahm (1–3)	**Jansen** (14)	41,671	29–16
46	May 17	@ Reds	**W** 6–0	**Hill** (1–1)	DeSclafani (2–2)	–	27,456	30–16
47	May 18	@ Reds	L 0–4	Mahle (1–5)	**Buehler** (4–1)	–	31,156	30–17
48	May 19	@ Reds	**W** 8–3	**Ryu** (6–1)	Roark (3–3)	–	31,016	31–17
49	May 21	@ Rays	**W** 7–3	**Kershaw** (4–0)	Wood (1–1)	–	15,862	32–17
50	May 22	@ Rays	L 1–8	Pagán (1–0)	**Floro** (1–1)	–	12,826	32–18
51	May 24	@ Pirates	**W** 10–2	**Buehler** (5–1)	Feliz (2–1)	–	32,388	33–18
52	May 25	@ Pirates	**W** 7–2	**Ryu** (7–1)	Musgrove (3–5)	–	25,852	34–18
53	May 26	@ Pirates	**W** 11–7	**Maeda** (6–2)	Archer (1–5)	–	25,260	35–18
54	May 27	Mets	**W** 9–5	**Kershaw** (5–0)	Bashlor (0–2)	**Jansen** (15)	47,816	36–18
55	May 28	Mets	L 3–7	Matz (4–3)	**García** (0–2)	–	45,713	36–19
56	May 29	Mets	**W** 9–8	**Alexander** (3–1)	Díaz (1–3)	–	40,559	37–19
57	May 30	Mets	**W** 2–0	**Ryu** (8–1)	Vargas (1–3)	**Jansen** (16)	47,846	38–19
58	May 31	Phillies	**W** 6–3	**Maeda** (7–2)	Arrieta (5–5)	**Jansen** (17)	54,307	39–19

June (18–10)

#	Date	Opponent	Score	Win	Loss	Save	Attendance	Record
59	June 1	Phillies	**W** 4–3	**Urías** (3–2)	Neris (1–2)	–	53,507	40–19
60	June 2	Phillies	**W** 8–0	**Hill** (2–1)	Velasquez (2–3)	–	49,162	41–19
61	June 3	@ Diamondbacks	**W** 3–1	**Buehler** (6–1)	Ray (4–3)	**Jansen** (18)	24,124	42–19
62	June 4	@ Diamondbacks	**W** 9–0	**Ryu** (9–1)	Clarke (1–2)	–	29,784	43–19
63	June 5	@ Diamondbacks	L 2–3 (11)	Godley (2–4)	**Alexander** (3–2)	–	22,753	43–20
64	June 7	@ Giants	L 1–2	Moronta (3–4)	**Kershaw** (5–1)	Smith (14)	35,157	43–21
65	June 8	@ Giants	**W** 7–2	**Hill** (3–1)	Samardzija (3–5)	–	37,784	44–21
66	June 9	@ Giants	**W** 1–0	**Buehler** (7–1)	Bumgarner (3–6)	**Jansen** (19)	34,298	45–21
67	June 10	@ Angels	L 3–5	Buttrey (4–2)	**Kelly** (1–3)	Robles (8)	45,477	45–22
68	June 11	@ Angels	L 3–5	Peña (4–1)	**Maeda** (7–3)	Robles (9)	45,404	45–23
69	June 13	Cubs	**W** 7–3	**Kershaw** (6–1)	Lester (5–5)	**Urías** (3)	44,970	46–23
70	June 14	Cubs	**W** 5–3	**Hill** (4–1)	Hendricks (7–5)	**Jansen** (20)	46,631	47–23
71	June 15	Cubs	L 1–2	Ryan (2–1)	**Jansen** (2–2)	Strop (8)	51,596	47–24
72	June 16	Cubs	**W** 3–2	**Stripling** (3–2)	Cishek (1–4)	**Jansen** (21)	53,817	48–24
73	June 17	Giants	L 2–3	Beede (1–2)	**Maeda** (7–4)	Smith (19)	42,479	48–25
74	June 18	Giants	**W** 9–0	**Kershaw** (7–1)	Anderson (2–2)	–	48,219	49–25
75	June 19	Giants	**W** 9–2	**Floro** (2–1)	Pomeranz (2–7)	–	43,802	50–25
76	June 20	Giants	**W** 9–8	**Chargois** (1–0)	Bumgarner (3–7)	**Jansen** (22)	43,742	51–25
77	June 21	Rockies	**W** 4–2	**Buehler** (8–1)	Díaz (1–2)	–	54,044	52–25
78	June 22	Rockies	**W** 5–4 (11)	**Kelly** (2–3)	Tinoco (0–1)	–	53,096	53–25
79	June 23	Rockies	**W** 6–3	**Jansen** (3–2)	Oberg (5–1)	–	50,023	54–25
80	June 24	@ Diamondbacks	L 5–8	López (1–1)	**Floro** (2–2)	Holland (11)	24,675	54–26
81	June 25	@ Diamondbacks	**W** 3–2	**Urías** (4–2)	Ray (5–5)	**Jansen** (23)	27,927	55–26
82	June 26	@ Diamondbacks	L 2–8	Clarke (2–3)	**Gonsolin** (0–1)	–	28,752	55–27
83	June 27	@ Rockies	**W** 12–8	**Báez** (3–2)	Davis (1–3)	–	47,452	56–27
84	June 28	@ Rockies	L 9–13	Senzatela (7–5)	**Ryu** (9–2)	–	46,065	56–28
85	June 29	@ Rockies	L 3–5	Gray (9–5)	**Kershaw** (7–2)	Davis (12)	48,101	56–29
86	June 30	@ Rockies	**W** 10–5	**Floro** (3–2)	Bettis (1–4)	–	47,713	57–29

July (14–10)

#	Date	Opponent	Score	Win	Loss	Save	Attendance	Record
87	July 2	Diamondbacks	**W** 5–4	**García** (1–2)	Holland (1–1)	–	52,969	58–29
88	July 3	Diamondbacks	**W** 5–4 (10)	**Kelly** (3–3)	López (1–2)	–	53,327	59–29
89	July 4	Padres	**W** 5–1	**Ryu** (10–2)	Lamet (0–1)	–	53,801	60–29
90	July 5	Padres	L 2–3	Stammen (6–4)	**García** (1–3)	Yates (28)	49,790	60–30
91	July 6	Padres	L 1–3	Wingenter (1–1)	**Maeda** (7–5)	Yates (29)	53,610	60–31
92	July 7	Padres	L 3–5	Lucchesi (7–4)	**Stripling** (3–3)	Yates (30)	44,171	60–32
–	July 9	90th All-Star Game	National League vs. American League (Progressive Field, Cleveland, Ohio)					
93	July 12	@ Red Sox	L 1–8	Rodríguez (10–4)	**Maeda** (7–6)	–	36,579	60–33
94	July 13	@ Red Sox	**W** 11–2	**Stripling** (4–3)	Sale (3–9)	–	36,607	61–33
95	July 14	@ Red Sox	**W** 7–4 (12)	**Floro** (4–2)	Velázquez (1–4)	**Kelly** (1)	36,700	62–33
96	July 15	@ Phillies	**W** 16–2	**Kershaw** (8–2)	Eflin (7–9)	–	30,025	63–33
97	July 16	@ Phillies	L 8–9	Suárez (1–0)	**Jansen** (3–3)	–	31,076	63–34
98	July 17	@ Phillies	**W** 7–2	**Báez** (4–2)	Nicasio (1–3)	–	31,067	64–34
99	July 18	@ Phillies	L 6–7	Suárez (2–0)	**Floro** (4–3)	Neris (18)	38,043	64–35
100	July 19	Marlins	**W** 2–1	**Ryu** (11–2)	Gallen (0–2)	**Jansen** (24)	52,471	65–35
101	July 20	Marlins	**W** 10–6	**Báez** (5–2)	Hernández (1–4)	–	53,778	66–35
102	July 21	Marlins	**W** 9–0	**Buehler** (9–1)	Yamamoto (4–1)	–	47,469	67–35
103	July 23	Angels	L 4–5	Peña (8–3)	**Maeda** (7–7)	Robles (15)	53,725	67–36
104	July 24	Angels	L 2–3	Barría (4–3)	**Stripling** (4–4)	Robles (16)	53,731	67–37
105	July 26	@ Nationals	**W** 4–2	**Kelly** (4–3)	Sipp (1–2)	**Jansen** (25)	37,491	68–37
106	July 27	@ Nationals	**W** 9–3	**Kershaw** (9–2)	Ross (0–3)	–	39,616	69–37
107	July 28	@ Nationals	L 4–11	Strasburg (14–4)	**Buehler** (9–2)	–	32,425	69–38
108	July 29	@ Rockies	L 1–9	Gray (10–7)	**Maeda** (7–8)	–	43,574	69–39
109	July 30	@ Rockies	**W** 9–4	**Sadler** (1–0)	Freeland (2–9)	**Gonsolin** (1)	45,300	70–39
110	July 31	@ Rockies	**W** 5–1	**Kelly** (5–3)	Davis (1–5)	—	42,025	71–39

August (17–11)

#	Date	Opponent	Score	Win	Loss	Save	Attendance	Record
111	August 1	Padres	**W** 8–2	**Kershaw** (10–2)	Lucchesi (7–6)	–	53,181	72–39
112	August 2	Padres	L 2–5	Lauer (6–8)	**May** (0–1)	Yates (32)	50,780	72–40
113	August 3	Padres	**W** 4–1	**Buehler** (10–2)	Quantrill (4–3)	–	54,010	73–40
114	August 4	Padres	**W** 11–10	**Báez** (6–2)	Yates (0–3)	–	44,110	74–40
115	August 5	Cardinals	**W** 8–0	**Gonsolin** (1–1)	Wacha (6–5)	–	45,254	75–40
116	August 6	Cardinals	**W** 3–1	**Kershaw** (11–2)	Mikolas (7–12)	**Jansen** (26)	53,070	76–40
117	August 7	Cardinals	**W** 2–1	**Sadler** (2–0)	Martínez (2–2)	–	48,994	77–40
118	August 9	Diamondbacks	L 2–3 (11)	Chafin (2–2)	**Urías** (4–3)	Bradley (3)	49,538	77–41
119	August 10	Diamondbacks	**W** 4–0	**Maeda** (8–8)	Young (4–2)	–	52,606	78–41
120	August 11	Diamondbacks	**W** 9–3	**Ryu** (12–2)	Leake (9–9)	–	44,619	79–41
121	August 13	@ Marlins	**W** 15–1	**May** (1–1)	Yamamoto (4–4)	–	8,729	80–41
122	August 14	@ Marlins	**W** 9–1	**Kershaw** (12–2)	Hernández (2–5)	–	8,810	81–41
123	August 15	@ Marlins	L 7–13	Smith (8–6)	**Buehler** (10–3)	–	8,471	81–42
124	August 16	@ Braves	**W** 8–3	**Kolarek** (5–3)	Newcomb (5–3)	**Urías** (4)	41,413	82–42
125	August 17	@ Braves	L 3–4	Newcomb (6–3)	**Ryu** (12–3)	Melancon (3)	43,619	82–43
126	August 18	@ Braves	L 3–5	Swarzak (3–3)	**May** (1–2)	Melancon (4)	37,617	82–44
127	August 20	Blue Jays	**W** 16–3	**Kershaw** (13–2)	Reid-Foley (2–4)	–	52,030	83–44
128	August 21	Blue Jays	**W** 2–1 (10)	**Báez** (7–2)	Mayza (1–3)	–	44,106	84–44
129	August 22	Blue Jays	**W** 3–2	**Sadler** (3–0)	Law (0–2)	–	49,796	85–44
130	August 23	Yankees	L 2–10	Paxton (10–6)	**Ryu** (12–4)	–	53,775	85–45
131	August 24	Yankees	**W** 2–1	**Gonsolin** (2–1)	Sabathia (5–8)	**Jansen** (27)	53,803	86–45
132	August 25	Yankees	L 1–5	Germán (17–3)	**Kershaw** (13–3)	–	53,828	86–46
133	August 26	@ Padres	L 3–4	Lauer (7–8)	**May** (1–3)	Yates (38)	26,712	86–47
134	August 27	@ Padres	**W** 9–0	**Buehler** (11–3)	Quantrill (6–5)	–	27,952	87–47
135	August 28	@ Padres	**W** 6–4 (10)	**Jansen** (4–3)	Yates (0–5)	**Sadler** (1)	26,871	88–47
136	August 29	@ Diamondbacks	L 5–11	Andriese (5–4)	**Ryu** (12–5)	–	22,581	88–48
137	August 30	@ Diamondbacks	L 4–5	Bradley (4–5)	**García** (1–4)	–	34,149	88–49
138	August 31	@ Diamondbacks	L 5–6	Ray (12–7)	**Kershaw** (13–4)	Bradley (10)	50,180	88–50

September (18–6)

#	Date	Opponent	Score	Win	Loss	Save	Attendance	Record
139	September 1	@ Diamondbacks	**W** 4–3 (11)	**Sadler** (4–0)	Clarke (4–5)	**Báez** (1)	34,439	89–50
140	September 2	Rockies	**W** 16–9	**Buehler** (12–3)	Lambert (2–6)	**Maeda** (1)	45,910	90–50
141	September 3	Rockies	**W** 5–3	**Ferguson** (1–1)	Shaw (2–2)	**Jansen** (28)	52.231	91–50
142	September 4	Rockies	**W** 7–3	**Kolarek** (6–3)	Senzatela (8–10)	–	45,761	92–50
143	September 6	Giants	L 4–5	Samardzija (10–11)	**Kershaw** (13–5)	Smith (32)	53,317	92–51
144	September 7	Giants	L 0–1	Beede (4–9)	**Gonsolin** (2–2)	Gustave (1)	53,870	92–52
145	September 8	Giants	**W** 5–0	**Maeda** (9–8)	Rodríguez (5–9)	–	52,310	93–52
146	September 10	@ Orioles	**W** 7–3	**Buehler** (13–3)	Blach (1–3)	–	12,356	94–52
147	September 11	@ Orioles	L 3–7	Armstrong (1–1)	**Ferguson** (1–2)	–	11,438	94–53
148	September 12	@ Orioles	**W** 4–2	**Gonsolin** (3–2)	Bundy (6–14)	**Jansen** (29)	12,746	95–53
149	September 13	@ Mets	**W** 9–2	**Kershaw** (14–5)	Syndergaard (10–8)	–	36,097	96–53
150	September 14	@ Mets	L 0–3	Lugo (6–3)	**Kelly** (5–4)	Wilson (3)	39,264	96–54
151	September 15	@ Mets	**W** 3–2	**Jansen** (5–3)	Lugo (6–4)	**Maeda** (2)	31,521	97–54
152	September 17	Rays	**W** 7–5	**Maeda** (10–8)	Fairbanks (1–3)	**Jansen** (30)	48,663	98–54
153	September 18	Rays	L 7–8 (11)	Poche (5–5)	**Sborz** (0–1)	Fairbanks (2)	48,253	98–55
154	September 20	Rockies	**W** 12–5	**Kershaw** (15–5)	Lambert (3–7)	–	53,704	99–55
155	September 21	Rockies	L 2–4	Gonzalez (2–6)	**Buehler** (13–4)	Díaz (5)	50,705	99–56
156	September 22	Rockies	**W** 7–4	**Ryu** (13–5)	Senzatela (10–11)	–	47.948	100–56
157	September 24	@ Padres	**W** 6–3	**Gonsolin** (4–2)	Bolaños (0–2)	**Jansen** (31)	29,708	101–56
158	September 25	@ Padres	**W** 6–4	**Floro** (5–3)	Bednar (0–1)	**Jansen** (32)	30,552	102–56
159	September 26	@ Padres	**W** 1–0	**Kershaw** (16–5)	Lucchesi (10–10)	**Maeda** (3)	26,285	103–56
160	September 27	@ Giants	**W** 9–2	**Buehler** (14–4)	Cueto (1–2)	–	36,554	104–56
161	September 28	@ Giants	**W** 2–0	**Ryu** (14–5)	Webb (2–3)	**Jansen** (33)	37,518	105–56
162	September 29	@ Giants	**W** 9–0	**May** (2–3)	Rodríguez (6–11)	–	41,909	106–56

Legend: = Win = Loss = Postponement
Bold = Dodgers team member

== Postseason ==
=== National League Division Series ===
The Dodgers, with the best record in the National League during the regular season, began the postseason by hosting the Washington Nationals in the Division Series. Walker Buehler struck out eight while allowing only one hit and three walks in six scoreless innings in the first game, while the Dodgers got home runs from Gavin Lux and Joc Pederson and three RBI by Max Muncy to win 6–0. Game 2 saw Clayton Kershaw start for the Dodgers against Stephen Strasburg. The Nationals jumped out to an early lead with an RBI single in the first, then added two more in the second. Kershaw pitched six innings, allowed three runs on six hits, two hit batters, and one walk with four strikeouts. The Dodgers finally scored on a sacrifice fly by in the sixth. Strasburg struck out 10 in six innings allowing only one run on three hits and the Nationals evened up the series with the 4–2 win. Hyun-jin Ryu started game 3 and allowed only a two-run homer by Juan Soto in five innings. The Dodgers exploded for seven runs in the sixth inning to come from behind and win 10–4. Justin Turner hit a three-run homer and Russell Martin hit a two-run homer in the game. In game 4, the Dodgers jumped out to an early lead on a home run by Turner in the first inning, but the Nationals tied it on a sacrifice fly in the third and went ahead in the fifth on a RBI single by Anthony Rendon and then a three-run homer by Ryan Zimmerman. The Nationals won 6–1 to even the series up at two games and force a deciding game five. In the final game of the series, Buehler started and allowed only one run in 6 2/3 innings while the Dodgers got a two-run homer by Muncy and a solo homer by Kiké Hernández to take a 3–0 lead after two innings. However, the Nationals got back to back homers by Rendon and Soto in the eighth inning off Kershaw to tie the score. It remained tied into the 10th when Howie Kendrick hit a grand slam off Joe Kelly to end the Dodgers season with a 7–3 loss.

=== Postseason game log ===
2019 Postseason Game Log: (2–3)
National League Division Series (2–3)

#	Date	Opponent	Score	Win	Loss	Save	Attendance	Record
1	October 3	Nationals	W 6–0	Buehler (1–0)	Corbin (0–1)	—	53,095	1–0
2	October 4	Nationals	L 2–4	Strasburg (1–0)	Kershaw (0–1)	Hudson (1)	53,086	1–1
3	October 6	@ Nationals	W 10–4	Ryu (1–0)	Corbin (0–2)	—	43,423	2–1
4	October 7	@ Nationals	L 1–6	Scherzer (1–0)	Urías (0–1)	—	36,847	2–2
5	October 9	Nationals	L 3–7 (10)	Hudson (1–0)	Kelly (0–1)	—	54,159	2–3

=== Postseason Rosters ===
Playoff Rosters
National League Division Series

- Pitchers: 7 Julio Urías 17 Joe Kelly 18 Kenta Maeda 21 Walker Buehler 22 Clayton Kershaw 44 Rich Hill 52 Pedro Báez 56 Adam Kolarek 68 Ross Stripling 74 Kenley Jansen 85 Dustin May 99 Hyun-jin Ryu
- Catchers: 16 Will Smith 55 Russell Martin
- Infielders: 3 Chris Taylor 5 Corey Seager 10 Justin Turner 13 Max Muncy 14 Enrique Hernández 25 David Freese 45 Matt Beaty 48 Gavin Lux
- Outfielders: 11 A. J. Pollock 31 Joc Pederson 35 Cody Bellinger

== Roster ==
2019 Los Angeles Dodgers
Roster
Pitchers: 75 Scott Alexander; 52 Pedro Báez; 21 Walker Buehler; 47 J. T. Chargois; 64 Caleb Ferguson; 51 Dylan Floro; 63 Yimi García; 46 Tony Gonsolin; 44 Rich Hill; 74 Kenley Jansen; 17 Joe Kelly; 22 Clayton Kershaw; 56 Adam Kolarek; 18 Kenta Maeda; 85 Dustin May; 59 Zac Rosscup; 99 Hyun-jin Ryu; 65 Casey Sadler; 77 Dennis Santana; 76 Josh Sborz; 50 Jaime Schultz; 48 Brock Stewart; 68 Ross Stripling; 7 Julio Urías	Catchers: 15 Austin Barnes; 58 Rocky Gale; 55 Russell Martin; 16 Will Smith; Infielders: 45 Matt Beaty; 25 David Freese; 26 Jedd Gyorko; 14 Enrique Hernández; 48 Gavin Lux; 13 Max Muncy; 43 Edwin Ríos; 5 Corey Seager; 3 Chris Taylor; 10 Justin Turner; 28 Tyler White	Outfielders: 35 Cody Bellinger; 41 Kyle Garlick; 9 Kristopher Negrón; 31 Joc Pederson; 11 A. J. Pollock; 27 Alex Verdugo; Other batters: 72 Travis d'Arnaud	Manager: 30 Dave Roberts; Coaches: 33 Aaron Bates (assistant hitting); 37 Brant Brown (hitting strategist); 82 Steve Cilladi (bullpen catcher); 12 Dino Ebel (third base); 8 Bob Geren (bench); 38 Chris Gimenez (game planning coach); 40 Rick Honeycutt (pitching); 29 George Lombard (first base); 23 Mark Prior (bullpen); 6 Robert Van Scoyoc (hitting)

== Statistics ==
=== Batting ===
List does not include pitchers. Stats in bold are the team leaders..

Note: G = Games played; AB = At bats; R = Runs; H = Hits; 2B = Doubles; 3B = Triples; HR = Home runs; RBI = Runs batted in; BB = Walks; SO = Strikeouts; SB = Stolen bases; AVG = Batting average; OBP = On base percentage; SLG = Slugging; OPS = On Base + Slugging

Player	G	AB	R	H	2B	3B	HR	RBI	BB	SO	SB	AVG	OBP	SLG	OPS
Cody Bellinger	**156**	**558**	**121**	**170**	34	3	**47**	**115**	**95**	108	**15**	**.305**	**.406**	**.629**	**1.035**
Corey Seager	134	489	82	133	**44**	1	19	87	44	98	1	.272	.335	.483	.817
Max Muncy	141	487	101	122	22	1	35	98	90	**149**	4	.251	.374	.515	.889
Justin Turner	135	479	80	139	24	0	27	67	51	88	2	.290	.372	.509	.881
Joc Pederson	149	450	83	112	16	3	36	74	50	111	1	.249	.339	.538	.876
Enrique Hernández	130	414	57	98	19	1	17	64	36	97	4	.237	.304	.411	.715
Chris Taylor	124	366	52	96	29	**4**	12	52	37	115	8	.262	.333	.462	.794
Alex Verdugo	106	343	43	101	22	2	12	44	26	49	4	.294	.342	.475	.817
A. J. Pollock	86	308	49	82	15	1	15	47	23	74	5	.266	.327	.468	.795
Matt Beaty	99	249	36	66	19	1	9	46	17	33	5	.265	.317	.458	.775
Austin Barnes	75	212	28	43	12	1	5	25	23	56	3	.203	.293	.340	.633
Russell Martin	83	209	29	46	5	0	6	20	30	60	1	.220	.337	.330	.667
Will Smith	54	170	30	43	9	0	15	42	18	52	2	.253	.337	.571	.907
David Freese	79	162	35	51	13	0	11	29	23	44	0	.315	.403	.599	1.002
Gavin Lux	23	75	12	18	4	1	2	9	7	24	2	.240	.305	.400	.705
Kristopher Negrón	30	54	9	14	1	0	2	7	3	17	0	.259	.298	.389	.687
Kyle Garlick	30	48	8	12	4	0	3	6	5	19	0	.250	.321	.521	.842
Edwin Ríos	28	47	10	13	2	1	4	8	9	21	0	.277	.393	.617	1.010
Jedd Gyorko	24	36	1	5	1	0	0	2	3	10	0	.139	.205	.167	.372
Tyler White	12	22	2	1	0	0	0	2	4	4	0	.045	.192	.045	.238
Rocky Gale	5	15	1	2	0	0	0	0	0	7	0	.133	.133	.133	.267
Travis d'Arnaud	1	1	0	0	0	0	0	0	0	0	0	.000	.000	.000	.000
Non-Pitcher Totals	162	5194	869	1367	295	20	277	844	594	1236	57	.263	.345	.488	.833
**Team totals**	**162**	**5493**	**886**	**1414**	**302**	**20**	**279**	**861**	**607**	**1356**	**57**	**.257**	**.338**	**.472**	**.810**

=== Pitching ===
Stats in bold are the team leaders.

Note: W = Wins; L = Losses; ERA = Earned run average; G = Games pitched; GS = Games started; SV = Saves; IP = Innings pitched; H = Hits allowed; R = Runs allowed; ER = Earned runs allowed; BB = Walks allowed; K = Strikeouts

Player	W	L	ERA	G	GS	SV	IP	H	R	ER	BB	K
Hyun-jin Ryu	14	5	**2.32**	29	29	0	**182.2**	**160**	53	47	24	163
Walker Buehler	14	4	3.26	30	**30**	0	182.1	153	**77**	66	37	**215**
Clayton Kershaw	**16**	5	3.03	29	28	0	178.1	145	63	60	41	189
Kenta Maeda	10	**8**	4.04	37	26	3	153.2	114	70	**69**	**51**	169
Ross Stripling	4	4	3.47	32	15	0	90.2	84	40	35	20	93
Julio Urías	4	3	2.49	37	8	4	79.2	59	28	22	27	85
Pedro Báez	7	2	3.10	**71**	0	1	69.2	43	30	24	23	69
Kenley Jansen	5	3	3.71	62	0	**33**	63.0	51	28	26	16	80
Yimi García	1	4	3.61	64	0	0	62.1	40	28	25	14	66
Rich Hill	4	1	2.45	13	13	0	58.2	48	20	16	18	72
Joe Kelly	5	4	4.56	55	0	1	51.1	49	31	26	22	62
Dylan Floro	5	3	4.24	50	0	0	46.2	46	25	22	14	42
Caleb Ferguson	1	2	4.84	46	2	0	44.2	39	26	24	27	54
Tony Gonsolin	4	2	2.93	11	6	1	40.0	26	15	13	15	37
Dustin May	2	3	3.63	14	4	0	34.2	33	17	14	5	32
Casey Sadler	4	0	2.33	24	1	1	27.0	25	9	7	8	20
J. T. Chargois	1	0	6.33	21	0	0	21.1	21	16	15	5	28
Scott Alexander	3	2	3.63	28	0	0	17.1	17	7	7	7	9
Adam Kolarek	2	0	0.77	26	0	0	11.2	9	3	1	2	9
Josh Sborz	0	1	8.00	7	0	0	9.0	10	8	8	4	7
Dennis Santana	0	0	7.20	3	0	0	5.0	6	4	4	4	6
Jaime Schultz	0	0	7.20	4	0	0	5.0	6	4	4	3	3
Russell Martin	0	0	0.00	4	0	0	4.0	2	0	0	0	2
Brock Stewart	0	0	18.00	3	0	0	4.0	9	8	8	2	3
Zac Rosscup	0	0	6.00	7	0	0	3.0	6	3	2	3	4
**Team totals**	**106**	**56**	**3.37**	**162**	**162**	**44**	**1445.2**	**1201**	**613**	**541**	**392**	**1519**

== Awards and honors ==
Recipient	Award	Date awarded	Ref.
Cody Bellinger	National League Player of the Week (April 1–7)	April 8, 2019	
Cody Bellinger	National League Player of the Month (April)	May 2, 2019	
Hyun-jin Ryu	National League Player of the Week (May 6–12)	May 13, 2019	
Hyun-jin Ryu	National League Pitcher of the Month (May)	June 3, 2019	
Cody Bellinger	National League All-Star Team	June 27, 2019	
Walker Buehler	National League All-Star Team	June 30, 2019	
Clayton Kershaw	National League All-Star Team	June 30, 2019	
Hyun-Jin Ryu	National League All-Star Team	June 30, 2019	
Max Muncy	National League All-Star Team	July 5, 2019	
Justin Turner	Roy Campanella Award	September 20, 2019	
Corey Seager	National League Player of the Week (September 16–22)	September 23, 2019	
Cody Bellinger	Fielding Bible Award (Right Field)	October 31, 2019	
Cody Bellinger	Fielding Bible Award (Multi-Positional)	October 31, 2019	
Cody Bellinger	Rawlings Gold Glove Award (NL Right field)	November 3, 2019	
Cody Bellinger	Silver Slugger Award (NL Outfielder)	November 3, 2019	
Cody Bellinger	National League Most Valuable Player Award	November 14, 2019	
Cody Bellinger	All-MLB Team	December 10, 2019	
Hyun-jin Ryu	All-MLB Team (2nd Team)	December 10, 2019	

== Transactions ==
=== March ===
- On March 28, placed LHP Clayton Kershaw on the 10-day injured list, retroactive to March 25, with left shoulder inflammation. Placed LHP Rich Hill on the 10-day injured list, retroactive to March 25, with a left knee sprain. Placed LHP Tony Cingrani on the 10-day injured list, retroactive to March 25, with left shoulder impingement.

=== April ===
- On April 5, LHP Donnie Hart was claimed off waivers by the Milwaukee Brewers.
- On April 7, optioned RHP Brock Stewart to AAA Oklahoma City and recalled RHP Dennis Santana from AAA Oklahoma City.
- On April 9, placed LHP Hyun-jin Ryu on the 10-day injured list with a left groin strain and recalled RHP J. T. Chargois from AAA Oklahoma City.
- On April 10, placed C Russell Martin on the 10-day injured list with inflammation in his lower back and recalled C Rocky Gale from AAA Oklahoma City.
- On April 11, optioned RHP J. T. Chargois to AAA Oklahoma City and recalled RHP Jaime Schultz from AAA Oklahoma City.
- On April 14, optioned RHP Dennis Santana to AAA Oklahoma City and recalled RHP Josh Sborz from AAA Oklahoma City.
- On April 15, activated LHP Clayton Kershaw from the 10-day injured list and optioned RHP Jaime Schultz to AAA Oklahoma City.
- On April 20, activated LHP Hyun-jin Ryu from the 10-day injured list and optioned RHP Josh Sborz to AAA Oklahoma City.
- On April 27, activated C Russell Martin from the 10-day injured list and optioned C Rocky Gale to AAA Oklahoma City.
- On April 28, activated LHP Rich Hill from the 10-day injured list and placed LHP Caleb Ferguson on the 10-day injured list with a strained left oblique.
- On April 30, placed OF A. J. Pollock on the 10-day injured list with right elbow inflammation and recalled IF Matt Beaty from AAA Oklahoma City.

=== May ===
- On May 5, signed free agent C Travis d'Arnaud and optioned IF Matt Beaty to AAA Oklahoma City.
- On May 10, traded C Travis d'Arnaud to the Tampa Bay Rays for cash and recalled C Rocky Gale from AAA Oklahoma City.
- On May 14, placed LHP Julio Urías on the restricted list and recalled RHP J. T. Chargois from AAA Oklahoma City.
- On May 16, activated LHP Caleb Ferguson from the 10-day injured list and optioned RHP J. T. Chargois and C Rocky Gale to AAA Oklahoma City.
- On May 17, placed RHP Kenta Maeda on the 10-day injured list with a left adductor contusion, recalled IF Matt Beaty from AAA Oklahoma City and purchased the contract of OF Kyle Garlick from AAA Oklahoma City.
- On May 21, reinstated LHP Julio Urías from the restricted list and optioned OF Kyle Garlick to AAA Oklahoma City.
- On May 24, placed RHP Joe Kelly on the bereavement list and recalled OF Kyle Garlick from AAA Oklahoma City.
- On May 26, activated RHP Kenta Maeda from the 10-day disabled list and optioned OF Kyle Garlick to AAA Oklahoma City.
- On May 27, activated RHP Joe Kelly from the bereavement list, optioned LHP Caleb Ferguson to AAA Oklahoma City, placed C Austin Barnes on the 10-day disabled list with a left groin strain and purchased the contract of C Will Smith from AAA Oklahoma City.

=== June ===
- On June 5, placed IF Matt Beaty on the 10-day injured list, retroactive to June 3, with a left hip flexor strain and recalled OF Kyle Garlick from AAA Oklahoma City.
- On June 6, activated C Austin Barnes from the 10-day injured list and optioned C Will Smith to AAA Oklahoma City.
- On June 11, placed LHP Scott Alexander on the 10-day injured list with left forearm inflammation and recalled LHP Caleb Ferguson from AAA Oklahoma City.
- On June 13, placed SS Corey Seager on the 10-day injured list with a left hamstring strain and activated IF Matt Beaty from the 10-day injured list.
- On June 20, placed LHP Rich Hill on the 10-day injured list with a left forearm strain, recalled RHP J. T. Chargois and RHP Josh Sborz from AAA Oklahoma City and optioned IF Matt Beaty to AAA Oklahoma City.
- On June 21, placed RHP Josh Sborz on the 10-day injured list with lower back soreness and recalled IF Matt Beaty from AAA Oklahoma City.
- On June 23, placed IF David Freese on the 10-day injured list with a left hamstring strain and recalled C Will Smith from AAA Oklahoma City.
- On June 26, purchased the contract of RHP Tony Gonsolin from AAA Oklahoma City, optioned C Will Smith to AAA Oklahoma City and transferred LHP Tony Cingrani from the 10-day injured list to the 60-day injured list.
- On June 27, optioned RHP Tony Gonsolin and LHP Caleb Ferguson to AAA Oklahoma City, recalled IF Edwin Ríos from AAA Oklahoma City, purchased the contract of LHP Zac Rosscup from AAA Oklahoma City and transferred OF A. J. Pollock from the 10-day injured list to the 60-day injured list.

=== July ===
- On July 1, activated RHP Josh Sborz from the 10-day injured list and optioned him to AAA Oklahoma City.
- On July 3, acquired RHP Casey Sadler from the Tampa Bay Rays in exchange for minor league pitcher Nathan Witt and optioned him to AAA Oklahoma City. Transferred LHP Rich Hill from the 10-day injured list to the 60-day injured list.
- On July 8, activated IF David Freese from the 10-day injured list and optioned IF Edwin Ríos and OF Kyle Garlick to AAA Oklahoma City.
- On July 10, activated SS Corey Seager from the 10-day injured list and optioned IF/OF Matt Beaty to AAA Oklahoma City.
- On July 12, traded LHP Adam McCreery and minor league C Josh Thole to the Los Angeles Angels for cash considerations and activated OF A. J. Pollock from the 60-day injured list.
- On July 15, placed IF/OF Chris Taylor on the 10-day injured list with a fractured left forearm, recalled RHP Casey Sadler and IF/OF Matt Beaty from AAA Oklahoma City and designated LHP Zac Rosscup for assignment.
- On July 18, optioned RHP Casey Sadler to AAA Oklahoma City and recalled LHP Caleb Ferguson from AAA Oklahoma City.
- On July 19, placed RHP Dylan Floro on the 10-day injured list with neck inflammation and recalled RHP Casey Sadler from AAA Oklahoma City.
- On July 23, outrighted catcher Rocky Gale to the minor leagues.
- On July 25, acquired 1B Tyler White from the Houston Astros in exchange for minor league pitcher Andre Scrubb and placed 1B David Freese on the 10-day injured list with a left hamstring strain.
- On July 26, Optioned C Austin Barnes to AAA Oklahoma City and recalled C Will Smith from AAA Oklahoma City.
- On July 27, placed RHP Ross Stripling on the 10-day injured list with right bicep tendinitis and recalled RHP Jaime Schultz from AAA Oklahoma City.
- On July 28, acquired IF/OF Kristopher Negrón from the Seattle Mariners in exchange for minor league infielder Daniel Castro.
- On July 29, placed IF/OF Enrique Hernández on the 10-day injured list with a left hand sprain, optioned RHP Jaime Schultz to AAA Oklahoma City, recalled RHP Josh Sborz from AAA Oklahoma City and activated IF/OF Kristopher Negrón.
- On July 30, optioned RHP Josh Sborz to AAA Oklahoma City and recalled RHP Tony Gonsolin from AAA Oklahoma City.
- On July 31, optioned RHP Tony Gonsolin to AAA Oklahoma City and activated RHP Dylan Floro from the 10-day injured list. Acquired IF Jedd Gyorko (as well as international cap space and cash considerations) from the St. Louis Cardinals for LHP Tony Cingrani and acquired LHP Adam Kolarek from the Tampa Bay Rays in exchange for minor league outfielder Niko Hulsizer. RHP Brock Stewart was claimed off waivers by the Toronto Blue Jays.

=== August ===
- On August 1, optioned LHP Caleb Ferguson to AAA Oklahoma City and activated LHP Adam Kolarek.
- On August 2, selected the contract of RHP Dustin May from AAA Oklahoma City, recalled RHP Tony Gonsolin from AAA Oklahoma City, optioned RHP Dylan Floro to AAA Oklahoma City, placed LHP Hyun-jin Ryu on the 10-day injured list with neck soreness and transferred LHP Scott Alexander from the 10-day injured list to the 60-day injured list.
- On August 6, placed OF Alex Verdugo on the 10-day injured list with a right oblique strain, optioned RHP Tony Gonsolin to AAA Oklahoma City and recalled LHP Caleb Ferguson and IF Edwin Ríos from AAA Oklahoma City.
- On August 11, optioned RHP Casey Sadler to AAA Oklahoma City and activated LHP Hyun-jin Ryu from the 10-day injured list.
- On August 13, placed 1B Tyler White on the 10-day injured list with a right trap strain and recalled OF Kyle Garlick from AAA Oklahoma City.
- On August 16, optioned RHP J. T. Chargois to AAA Oklahoma City and recalled RHP Josh Sborz from AAA Oklahoma City.
- On August 17, placed LHP Julio Urías on the restricted list and recalled RHP Casey Sadler from AAA Oklahoma City.
- On August 18, activated 3B Jedd Gyorko from the 60-day injured list, optioned RHP Josh Sborz and IF Edwin Ríos to AAA Oklahoma City and recalled RHP Tony Gonsolin from AAA Oklahoma City.
- On August 20, activated IF/OF Enrique Hernández and IF/OF Chris Taylor from the 10-day injured list, recalled RHP Dylan Floro from AAA Oklahoma City, optioned RHP Casey Sadler and OF Kyle Garlick to AAA Oklahoma City and placed IF/OF Kristopher Negrón on the 10-day injured list with neck stiffness.
- On August 21, placed RHP Dylan Floro on the 10-day injured list with a left intercostal strain and recalled RHP Casey Sadler from AAA Oklahoma City.
- On August 24, placed C Russell Martin on the bereavement list and recalled C Austin Barnes from AAA Oklahoma City.
- On August 27, activated C Russell Martin from the bereavement list and optioned C Austin Barnes to AAA Oklahoma City.
- On August 30, placed IF Max Muncy on the 10-day injured list with a wrist fracture and activated IF/OF Kristopher Negrón from the 10-day injured list.

=== September ===
- On September 1, activated RHP Ross Stripling, RHP Dylan Floro and IF David Freese from the 10-day injured list.
- On September 2, activated LHP Julio Urías from the restricted list, recalled RHP Josh Sborz from AAA Oklahoma City, selected the contract of IF Gavin Lux from AAA Oklahoma City and transferred IF Tyler White from the 10-day injured list to the 60-day injured list.
- On September 6, recalled C Austin Barnes from AAA Oklahoma City.
- On September 10, recalled IF Edwin Ríos from AAA Oklahoma City.
- On September 12, activated LHP Rich Hill from the 60-day injured list and designated RHP Jaime Schultz for assignment.
- On September 13, activated IF Max Muncy from the 10-day injured list.

== Farm system ==
Level	Team	League	Manager	W	L	Position
AAA	Oklahoma City Dodgers	Pacific Coast League	Travis Barbary	62	77	4th place
AA	Tulsa Drillers	Texas League	Scott Hennessey	78	61	2nd place Lost in playoffs
High A	Rancho Cucamonga Quakes	California League	Mark Kertenian	81	57	1st place Lost in playoffs
A	Great Lakes Loons	Midwest League	John Shoemaker	81	55	1st place Lost in playoffs
Adv. Rookie	Ogden Raptors	Pioneer League	Austin Chubb	54	22	1st place Lost in playoffs
Rookie	Arizona League Dodgers Mota	Arizona League	Jair Fernandez	33	23	1st place Lost in playoffs
Rookie	Arizona League Dodgers Lasorda	Arizona League	Danny Dorn	27	29	3rd place
Foreign Rookie	DSL Dodgers Bautista	Dominican Summer League	Keyter Collado	37	32	3rd place
Foreign Rookie	DSL Dodgers Shoemaker	Dominican Summer League	Fumi Ishibashi	35	34	3rd place

=== Mid-Season All-Stars ===
- All-Star Futures Game

Pitcher Dustin May
Shortstop Gavin Lux

- Pacific Coast League All-Stars.

Pitcher Kevin Quackenbush
Catcher Will Smith

- Texas League All-Stars

Pitcher Dustin May
Pitcher Shea Spitzbarth
Catcher Keibert Ruiz
Shortstop Gavin Lux
Third Baseman Cristian Santana
Outfielder Cody Thomas
Infielder Zach McKinstry
Infielder Chris Parmelee

- California League All-Stars

Pitcher Wills Montgomerie
Pitcher Logan Salow
Pitcher Edwin Uceta
Catcher Connor Wong
Shortstop Jeter Downs
Third Baseman Devin Mann
Outfielder Donovan Casey

- Midwest League All-Stars

Pitcher Jose Chacin
Pitcher Brett de Geus
Pitcher Austin Drury
First baseman Dillon Paulson
Third baseman Miguel Vargas
Outfielder Niko Hulsizer

- Pioneer League All-Stars.

Pitcher Kevin Malisheski
Pitcher Corey Merrill
Infielder Brandon Lewis
Infielder Sam McWilliams
Outfielder John Littell
Outfielder Andy Pages

- Dominican Summer League All-Stars

Pitcher Christian Suarez
Infielder Kiumel Bastardo

=== Post-Season All-Stars ===
- Texas League All-Stars.

Pitcher Dustin May
Shortstop Gavin Lux

- California League All-Stars

Second Baseman Devin Mann
Outfielder Donovan Casey
Utility Jeter Downs

- Midwest League All-Stars

Manager John Shoemaker
Third baseman Miguel Vargas

- Arizona League All-Stars

Right-handed relief pitcher Adolfo Ramirez

- Baseball America Minor League All-Stars.

Second Baseman Gavin Lux (first team)
Shortstop Jeter Downs (second team)

- Baseball America Triple-A All-Stars.

Shortstop Gavin Lux

- Baseball America Double-A All-Stars.

Shortstop Gavin Lux

- Baseball America High Class-A All-Stars.

Second Baseman Devin Mann
Shortstop Jeter Downs

- Baseball America Low Class-A All-Stars.

Third Baseman Miguel Vargas

- Baseball America Rookie League All-Stars.

Pitcher Melvin Jimenez
Third Baseman Brandon Lewis
Outfielder Andy Pages

- Baseball America Dominican Summer League All-Stars.

Pitcher Heisell Baro
Pitcher Jerming Rosario

=== Notes ===
- Gavin Lux was selected as Baseball America's Minor League Player of the Year.
- Gavin Lux and Josiah Gray were named the Dodgers Minor League player and pitcher of the year.
- The Tulsa Drillers qualified for the Texas League playoffs on August 26 and clinched the second half division title on September 1. They defeated the Arkansas Travelers in the first round of the playoffs but lost to the Amarillo Sod Poodles in the championship series.
- The Rancho Cucamonga Quakes clinched the California League South Division championship on June 11, guaranteeing a fifth straight appearance in the postseason. They lost to the Lake Elsinore Storm in the first round of the playoffs.
- The Great Lakes Loons clinched a Midwest League playoff spot on June 12. They defeated the Lake County Captains in three games in the first round of the playoffs but were defeated in the Eastern Division Finals by the South Bend Cubs.
- The Ogden Raptors won their division title and advanced to the Pioneer League playoffs and they then defeated the Grand Junction Rockies in the first round of the playoffs. However, they lost in the championship series to the Idaho Falls Chukars.
- The Arizona League Dodgers Mota team qualified for the Arizona League playoffs by winning the second half division title. However, they lost to the Arizona League Rangers in the first round of the playoffs and were eliminated.

== Major League Baseball draft ==
The Dodgers received a compensation pick as a result of their failure to sign J. T. Ginn in the 2018 draft. They lost their second round pick as a result of signing free agent A. J. Pollock and gained a second round compensation pick as a result of losing Yasmani Grandal to free agency. With their two first round picks, they selected college infielders Kody Hoese and Michael Busch. As of the 2026 season, seven players from this draft have played in the majors.

2019 draft picks

Round	Name	Position	School	Signed	Career span	Highest level
1	Kody Hoese	3B	Tulane University	yes	2019–2025	AAA
1	Michael Busch	2B	University of North Carolina	yes	2019–present	MLB
2C	Jimmy Lewis	RHP	Lake Travis High School	yes	2021–2024	A
3	Ryan Pepiot	RHP	Butler University	yes	2019–present	MLB
4	Brandon Lewis	3B	University of California, Irvine	yes	2019–present	AA
5	Jack Little	RHP	Stanford University	yes	2019–present	MLB
6	Aaron Ochsenbein	RHP	Eastern Kentucky University	yes	2019–2023	AAA
7	Nick Robertson	RHP	James Madison University	yes	2019–present	MLB
8	Ryan Ward	LF	Bryant University	yes	2019–present	MLB
9	Alec Gamboa	LHP	Fresno City College	yes	2019–present	MLB
10	Zac Ching	SS	Virginia Commonwealth University	yes	2019–2022	A+
11	Logan Boyer	RHP	San Diego State University	yes	2021–2025	AAA
12	Mitchell Tyranski	LHP	Michigan State University	yes	2019–2025	AA
13	Jake Cantleberry	LHP	University of Missouri	yes	2019–2024	AA
14	Sean Mellen	LHP	Northeastern University	yes	2019–2023	AAA
15	Joe Vranesh	OF	Saint Mary's College of California	yes	2019–2022	A+
16	Andrew Baker	RHP	Chipola College	no Phillies–2021	2021–present	AAA
17	Brandon Wulff	OF	Stanford University	yes	2019–2021	A
18	Jeff Belge	LHP	St. John's University	yes	2019–2024	AA
19	Braidyn Fink	RHP	University of Oklahoma	yes	2021	A+
20	Zack Plunkett	RHP	University of Arkansas	yes	2019–2022	AA
21	Trey LaFleur	OF	J. M. Tate High School	no		
22	Jimmy Titus	SS	Bryant University	yes	2019–2021	A+
23	Cyrillo Watson	RHP	University of Illinois	yes	2019–2022	AAA
24	Chet Allison	OF	Fresno City College	yes	2019–2021	Rookie
25	Jonny DeLuca	OF	University of Oregon	yes	2019–present	MLB
26	Mark Mixon	RHP	University of Miami	yes	2019–2021	Rookie
27	Parker Brahms	RHP	Sacramento State University	no	2021–2025	A
28	Brennan Milone	SS	Woodstock High School	no Athletics–2022	2022–present	AAA
29	Breyln Jones	SS	Rutherford High School	yes	2022–present	Rookie
30	Josh Ibarra	RHP	Golden West College	no	2022	Ind
31	Kayler Yates	SS	Dixie High School	no		
32	Dan Sinatro	OF	Washington State University	yes	2019–2021	Rookie
33	Julio Carrion	3B	Chipola College	yes	2019–2023	AAA
34	Francisco Martinez	LHP	Puerto Rico Baseball Academy	yes	2019–2022	Rookie
35	Justin Washington	OF	Savannah State University	yes	2019–2022	A
36	Matthew Kanfer	OF	Pepperdine University	no		
37	Tres Gonzalez	OF	Mount Vernon Presbyterian School	no Pirates–2022	2022–present	AA
38	Tyler Ryan	C	University of the Pacific	yes	2019–2023	Rookie
39	Caden MacDonald	LHP	Pantego Christian Academy	no		
40	Ty Haselman	C	UCLA	no		
