= Jaime Schultz =

American baseball player (born 1991)

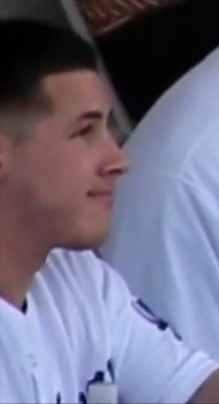
- Jaime Schultz in 2019
- Pitcher
- Born: June 20, 1991 (age 35); Albany, New York, U.S.
- Batted: Right Threw: Right

MLB debut
- May 29, 2018, for the Tampa Bay Rays

Last MLB appearance
- July 28, 2019, for the Los Angeles Dodgers

MLB statistics
- Win–loss record: 2-2
- Earned run average: 5.86
- Strikeouts: 38
- Stats at Baseball Reference

Teams
- Tampa Bay Rays (2018); Los Angeles Dodgers (2019)

Jaime Matthew Schultz (born June 20, 1991) is an American former professional baseball pitcher. He played in Major League Baseball (MLB) for the Tampa Bay Rays and Los Angeles Dodgers.

== Early years ==
Schultz attended Maple Hill High School in Castleton-on-Hudson, New York. Schultz was named to the All-New York State team for soccer, and also led the school's baseball and basketball teams to championships. For the baseball team, Schultz recorded 157 strikeouts in 71 innings pitched as a senior. He enrolled at High Point University, and was named to the All-Big South Conference's second team as a freshman, in 2010. He missed the 2011 season while recovering from Tommy John surgery. In 2012, he played collegiate summer baseball with the Chatham Anglers of the Cape Cod Baseball League.

== Career ==
=== Tampa Bay Rays ===
The Tampa Bay Rays selected Schultz in the 14th round of the 2013 Major League Baseball draft. After he signed with the Rays, he made his debut that same year for the Hudson Valley Renegades of the Low–A New York–Penn League and spent the whole season there, going 1-2 with a 3.05 ERA in 44.1 innings pitched. Schultz played for the Bowling Green Hot Rods of the Single–A Midwest League and Charlotte Stone Crabs of the High–A Florida State League in 2014, compiling a combined 4-1 record and 2.40 ERA in 14 starts between both teams. After the 2014 season, the Rays assigned Schultz to the Peoria Javelinas of the Arizona Fall League. Schultz spent the 2015 season with the Montgomery Biscuits of the Double–A Southern League where he posted a 9-5 record with a 3.67 ERA and 1.44 WHIP in 27 starts. Schultz was invited to spring training with the Rays in 2016 as a non-roster invitee. He spent the 2016 season with the Durham Bulls of the Triple–A International League. In 27 starts, he was 5-7 with a 3.58 ERA. On November 19, 2016, the Rays added Schultz to their 40-man roster to protect him from the Rule 5 draft. In 2017, he began the season back with Durham but was placed on the disabled list on April 8 and missed nearly three months. He pitched only 19.2 innings in 2017. He began 2018 with Durham. He was 1-1 with a 9.98 ERA with 29 strikeouts in 15.1 innings pitching out of the bullpen prior with Triple-A Durham prior to his call-up.

On May 27, 2018, Tampa Bay recalled Schultz. He made his major league debut on May 29 in relief in the seventh inning against the Oakland Athletics, pitching one scoreless inning in which he struck out the side on 14 pitches. However, he was sent back down to Durham after the game to make room for Nathan Eovaldi who was activated from the disabled list. He was recalled back to Tampa on July 8. He finished the season with a 2-2 record in 22 games, striking out 35 in 30 1/3 innings.

On January 4, 2019, Schultz was designated for assignment following the acquisition of Oliver Drake.

=== Los Angeles Dodgers ===
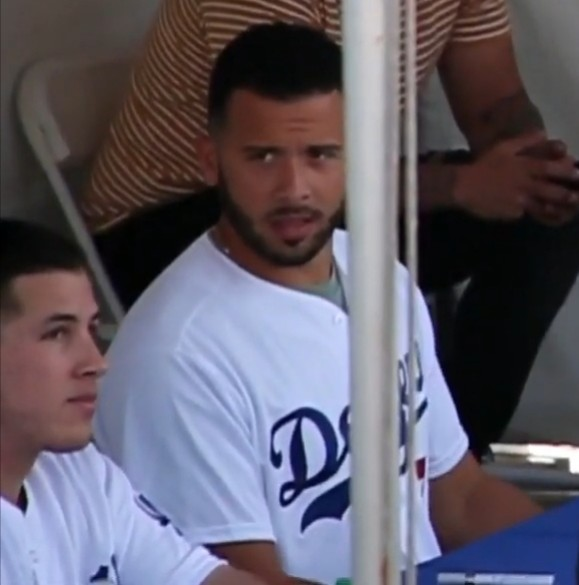
Schultz (Left) with Edwin Ríos in 2019 Dodgers' fanfest

On January 8, 2019, the Rays traded Schultz to the Los Angeles Dodgers in exchange for minor league pitcher Caleb Sampen. He appeared in only four games for the Dodgers, allowing four runs to score in five innings while spending most of the year with the Triple-A Oklahoma City Dodgers. In the minors he appeared in 47 games with a 5.85 ERA. The Dodgers designated him for assignment on September 12. Schultz elected free agency following the season on November 4.

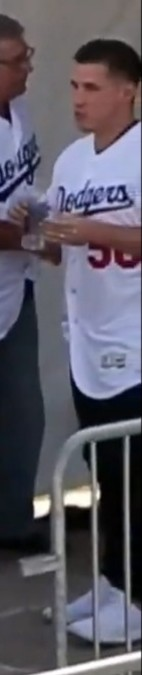
Schultz (Right) in 2019 Dodgers' fanfest

=== Oakland Athletics ===
On November 25, 2019, Schultz signed a minor league contract with the Oakland Athletics. Schultz did not play in a game in 2020 due to the cancellation of the minor league season because of the COVID-19 pandemic. He became a free agent on November 2, 2020.

=== Seattle Mariners ===
On February 1, 2021, Schultz signed a minor league deal with an invitation to Spring Training with the Seattle Mariners. Schultz worked to a 15.00 ERA in 5 appearances for the Triple-A Tacoma Rainiers before he was released by the organization on September 20. Schultz did not make a professional appearance in 2022 while he dealt with an oblique issue.

=== Gastonia Honey Hunters ===
On January 25, 2023, Schultz signed a minor league contract with the Tampa Bay Rays organization. He was released by the Rays on April 12.

On April 28, 2023, Schultz signed with the Gastonia Honey Hunters of the Atlantic League of Professional Baseball. In 27 games for Gastonia, he registered a 4.05 ERA with 44 strikeouts and 9 saves in 26 2/3 innings pitched.
