= Kyle Garlick =

American baseball player (born 1992)

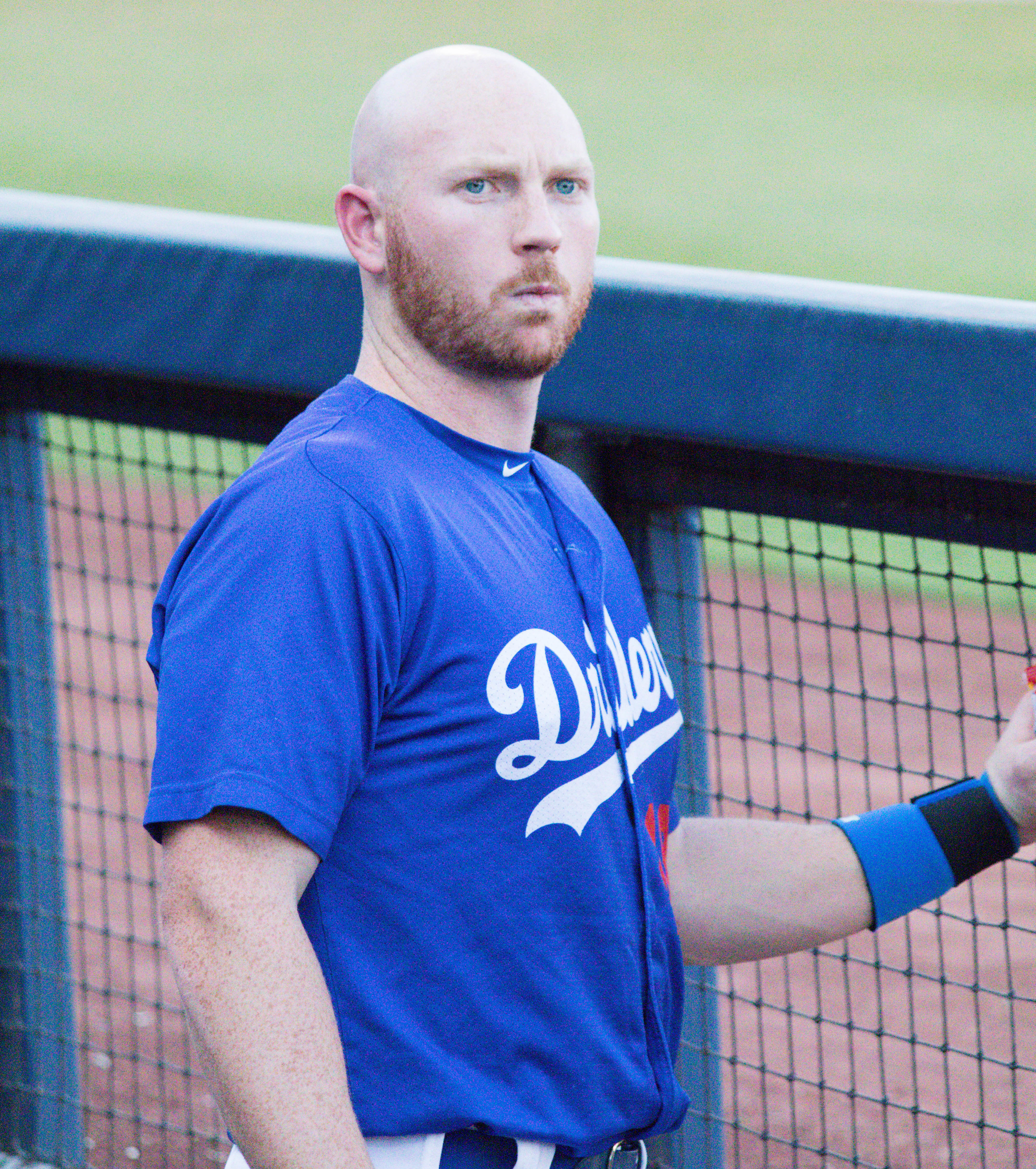
- Garlick with the Tulsa Drillers in 2016

Charros de Jalisco – No. 41
- Outfielder
- Born: January 26, 1992 (age 34); La Habra, California, U.S.
- Bats: Right Throws: Right

MLB debut
- May 19, 2019, for the Los Angeles Dodgers

MLB statistics (through 2023 season)
- Batting average: .225
- Home runs: 19
- Runs batted in: 41
- Stats at Baseball Reference

Teams
- Los Angeles Dodgers (2019); Philadelphia Phillies (2020); Minnesota Twins (2021–2023)

Kyle Bruce Garlick (born January 26, 1992) is an American professional baseball outfielder for the Charros de Jalisco of the Mexican League. He has previously played in Major League Baseball (MLB) for the Los Angeles Dodgers, Philadelphia Phillies, and Minnesota Twins. Prior to his professional career, Garlick played college baseball for the Cal Poly Pomona Broncos, where he set the single-season record for home runs.

== Amateur career ==
Garlick graduated from Chino Hills High School in Chino Hills, California. He enrolled at the University of Oregon and played college baseball for the Oregon Ducks for three years. An injury and a family health scare during his junior season led to him putting up sub-par numbers and not being selected for the 2014 MLB draft. He then transferred to California State Polytechnic University, Pomona (Cal Poly Pomona) and played for the Cal Poly Pomona Broncos in 2015. That year, he set the Broncos single-season home run record with his 17th home run, breaking Travis Taijeron's previous record of 16. He finished the year with a .358 batting average and 17 home runs.

== Professional career ==
=== Los Angeles Dodgers ===
The Los Angeles Dodgers selected Garlick in the 28th round of the 2015 Major League Baseball draft. He received a $1,000 signing bonus from the Dodgers. Garlick played in 60 games across four different levels in 2015, hitting .349. He began the following season with the Rancho Cucamonga Quakes of the High–A California League, where he hit three home runs, including an inside the park one, in a game against the Lancaster JetHawks on April 19. In 49 games with the Quakes, he hit .306 with 11 home runs and 37 runs batted in (RBIs). He was chosen to represent them at the mid-season all-star game, though he was unable to play in the game as a result of a promotion to the Tulsa Drillers of the Double-A Texas League.

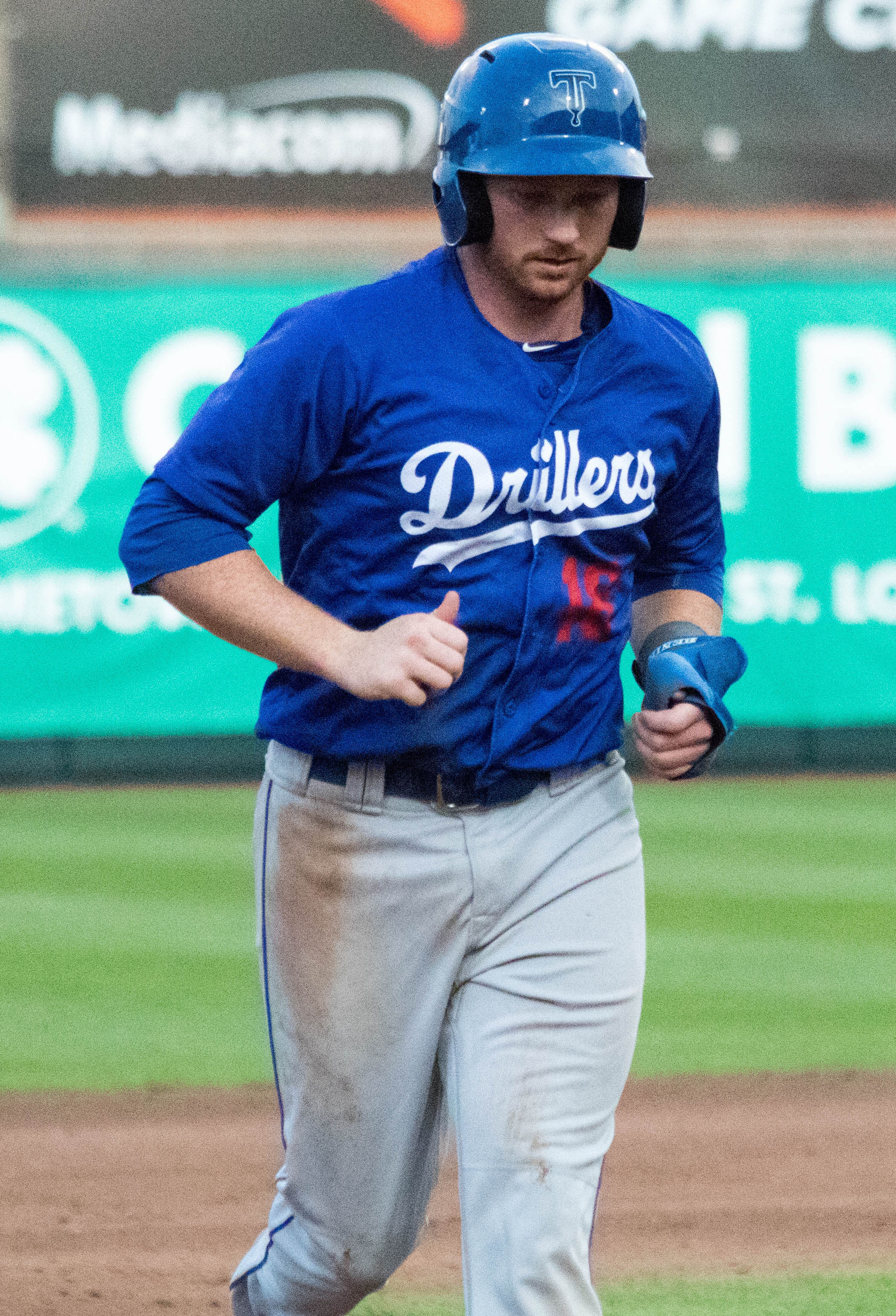
Garlick with the Tulsa Drillers

In 2017, Garlick was named to the mid-season Texas League all-star game, but missed that game as the result of a hand injury. He hit .239 in 74 games for the Drillers with 17 home runs and 42 RBIs. The next year, he started with Tulsa before an early season promotion to the Oklahoma City Dodgers of the Triple-A Pacific Coast League. Between the two levels, he hit .259 with 22 home runs and 60 RBIs.

The Dodgers promoted Garlick to the major leagues on May 17, 2019. He lined out to left field in his first MLB at-bat, as a pinch hitter on May 19 against the Cincinnati Reds. On June 8, 2019, Garlick recorded his first MLB hit, a pinch-hit double off of Jeff Samardzija of the San Francisco Giants. On June 19, 2019, Garlick hit his first major league home run off of Drew Pomeranz of the San Francisco Giants. He played in 30 games for the Dodgers in 2019, with three home runs, six RBIs, and a .250 batting average. He spent most of the season with Oklahoma City, where he hit .314 in 81 games with 23 homers and 59 RBIs.

On February 10, 2020, Garlick was designated for assignment after the Dodgers traded for Mookie Betts and David Price.

=== Philadelphia Phillies ===
On February 15, 2020, Garlick was traded to the Philadelphia Phillies in exchange for Tyler Gilbert. He played in 12 games for the Phillies, going 3–for–22 (.136) with a one RBI and one walk. On January 18, 2021, Garlick was designated for assignment by the Phillies following the signing of Archie Bradley.

=== Minnesota Twins ===
On January 22, 2021, Garlick was claimed off waivers by the Atlanta Braves. On February 5, Garlick was designated for assignment by the Braves after Marcell Ozuna was re–signed.

On February 11, 2021, Garlick was claimed off waivers by the Minnesota Twins. After a productive spring training, he earned a spot on the Twins' 2021 Opening Day roster. Garlick was placed on the 60-day injured list on July 24 with a sports hernia. In 36 games with the Twins, Garlick slashed .232/.280/.465 with 5 home runs and 10 RBI. He was outrighted off of the 40-man roster on November 19, 2021.

The Twins promoted Garlick back to the major leagues on April 15, 2022. In 66 games for the Twins, Garlick slashed .233/.284/.433 with career-highs in home runs (9) and RBI (18). Garlick was designated for assignment by the Twins on January 11, 2023, after the team re-signed Carlos Correa. On January 17, Garlick cleared waivers and was sent outright to the Triple-A St. Paul Saints.

On April 13, 2023, Garlick was once again promoted by the Twins to the Major League roster. In 14 games for Minnesota, he hit just .179/.233/.429 with 2 home runs and 4 RBI. He was designated for assignment on June 20, following the promotion of Oliver Ortega. On June 24, Garlick cleared waivers and was sent outright to Triple–A St. Paul. On October 2, Garlick elected free agency.

=== Arizona Diamondbacks ===
On February 23, 2024, Garlick signed a minor league contract with the Arizona Diamondbacks. In 136 appearances for the Triple-A Reno Aces, he batted .237/.329/.444 with 28 home runs and 105 RBI. Garlick elected free agency following the season on November 4.

=== Charros de Jalisco ===
On March 14, 2025, Garlick signed with the Charros de Jalisco of the Mexican League. In 86 games he hit .297/.399/.558 with 18 home runs, 64 RBIs and 8 stolen bases.

== Personal life ==
Garlick's mother, Cary, was diagnosed with breast cancer in 2014.
