= Edwin Ríos =

Puerto Rican baseball player (born 1994)

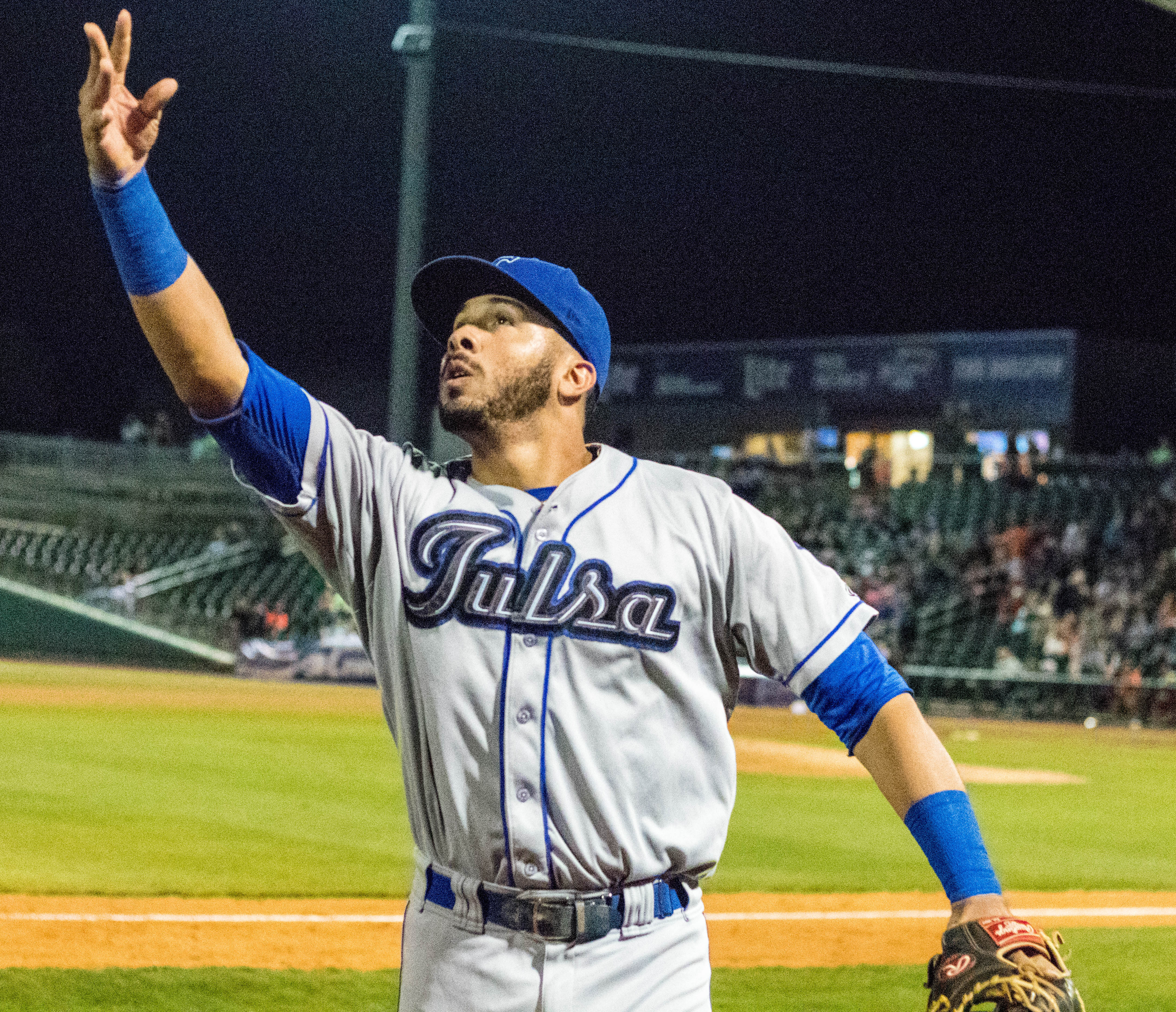
- Ríos with the Tulsa Drillers in 2017

Free agent
- Third baseman / First baseman
- Born: April 21, 1994 (age 32); Caguas, Puerto Rico
- Bats: Left Throws: Right

MLB debut
- June 27, 2019, for the Los Angeles Dodgers

MLB statistics (through 2024 season)
- Batting average: .202
- Home runs: 21
- Runs batted in: 45
- Stats at Baseball Reference

Teams
- Los Angeles Dodgers (2019–2022); Chicago Cubs (2023); Cincinnati Reds (2024)

Career highlights and awards
- World Series champion (2020)

Edwin Gabriel Ríos (born April 21, 1994) is a Puerto Rican professional baseball third baseman and first baseman who is a free agent. He has previously played in Major League Baseball (MLB) for the Los Angeles Dodgers, Chicago Cubs, and Cincinnati Reds. He played college baseball for Florida International University. Ríos was drafted by the Dodgers in the sixth round of the 2015 MLB draft and debuted for them in 2019.

== Early life and amateur career ==
Ríos was born in Caguas, Puerto Rico. His parents are Heyda Rosario and Edwin Rios. Early in life, his family moved to Kissimmee, Florida, where he played baseball at Osceola High School.

Ríos attended Florida International University (FIU), and played college baseball for the FIU Panthers. In his junior year in 2015, he batted .314/.421/.592 (second in Conference USA) with 18 home runs (leading the conference) and 56 runs batted in (RBIs; 2nd) in 223 at bats. In 2013 he played collegiate summer baseball with the Cotuit Kettleers of the Cape Cod Baseball League. He then returned to the league in 2014 to play for the Orleans Firebirds. Ríos was drafted by the Dodgers in the sixth round of the 2015 Major League Baseball draft.

== Professional career ==
=== Los Angeles Dodgers ===
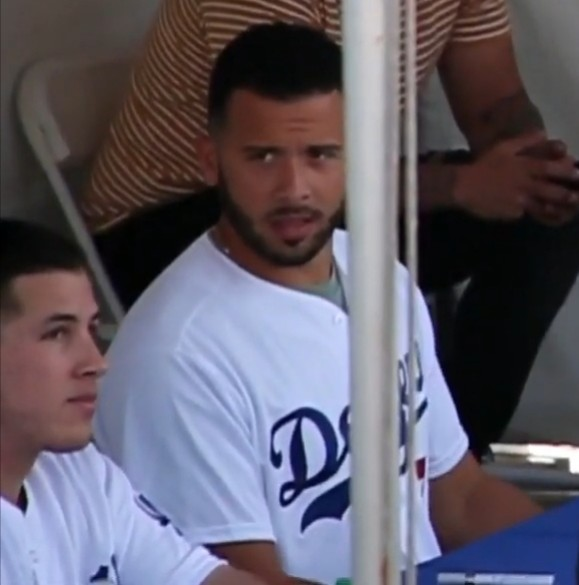
Ríos (right) with Jaime Schultz at 2019 Dodgers' fanfest

Ríos began his professional career with the rookie–level Arizona League Dodgers in 2015 but was quickly promoted to the rookie–level Ogden Raptors of the Pioneer Baseball League. He hit .253/.317/.467 with three home runs and 13 RBI in 22 games for the two teams.

He began 2016 with the Single–A Great Lakes Loons of the Midwest League, hitting .252 with six homers and 13 RBI in 33 games, earning a promotion to the High–A Rancho Cucamonga Quakes of the California League, where he hit .367/.394/.712 with 16 homers and 46 RBI in 177 at-bats over 42 games. Ríos was later promoted again, to the Double–A Tulsa Drillers of the Texas League. He was named the Dodgers organizational minor league player of the year for 2016.

Ríos was named as a starter in the Texas League mid-season All-Star Game in 2017. For the season, he played in 128 games between Tulsa and the Triple–A Oklahoma City Dodgers and hit .309/.362/.533 with 24 homers and 91 RBI in 393 at-bats. He was named a Baseball America Double-A All-Star, and an MiLB.com Dodgers Organization All-Star.

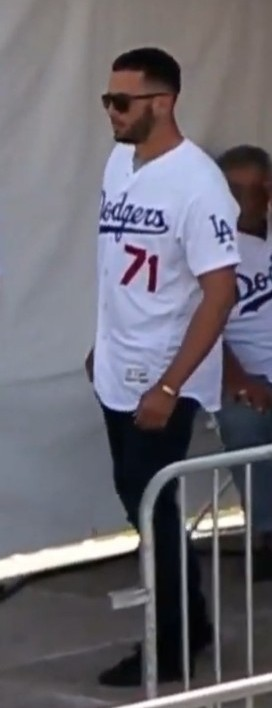
Ríos in 2019 Dodgers' fanfest

On November 20, 2018, the Dodgers added Ríos to their 40-man roster to protect him from the Rule 5 draft. He returned to Oklahoma City to begin 2019, and batted .270/.340/.575 with 31 home runs and 91 RBI in 393 at-bats. He was named an MiLB.com Dodgers Organization All-Star.

Ríos was promoted to the major leagues for the first time on June 27, 2019. He made his debut that night as a pinch hitter against the Colorado Rockies and grounded out to first base. His first major league hit was a triple off of Jon Gray of the Rockies on June 29. On August 14, Ríos hit his first two major league home runs off of Elieser Hernández of the Miami Marlins. He appeared in 28 games for the Dodgers in 2019, hitting .277/.393/.617 with four home runs and eight RBI in 47 at-bats. He played 12 games at first base, three at third base, one in left field, and one at DH.

Ríos hit the first-ever two-run home run by a batter leading off an inning in MLB history on July 29, 2020. The home run came in the top of the 13th inning in a game against the Houston Astros and ended up being the deciding factor in the game.

During the pandemic-shortened 2020 season, Ríos appeared in 32 games for the Dodgers, batting .250/.301/.645 with eight home runs and 17 RBI in 76 at-bats. He played 21 games at third base, six at first base, and one at DH. He was hitless in three at-bats with a walk in his one start in the National League Wild Card Series against the Milwaukee Brewers. He suffered a groin injury prior to the second round of the playoffs and was left off the roster. He rejoined the Dodgers roster for the 2020 NLCS, where he hit two home runs in nine at-bats against the Atlanta Braves. Ríos only had two at-bats in the 2020 World Series, both of which were strikeouts.

In 2021, Ríos batted .078/.217/.137, playing in 25 games with four hits in 51 at-bats with one home run. However, his season ended on May 11, when the Dodgers announced that he would undergo season-ending surgery on a partially torn labrum in his right shoulder.

Ríos began the 2022 season on the major league roster, appearing in 27 games and hitting .244 with seven homers and 17 RBI. He suffered a hamstring strain on June 3 and spent the next two and a half months on the injured list. When Ríos finally returned in mid-August there was no longer a spot on the major league club and he spent the rest of the season with Oklahoma City. In the minors, he played in 48 games and hit .259 with nine homers and 39 RBI.

On November 18, 2022, Ríos was non-tendered by the Dodgers and became a free agent.

=== Chicago Cubs ===
Ríos signed a one year, $1 million, Major League contract with the Chicago Cubs on February 17, 2023. In 18 games, he went 2–for–28 (.071) with 1 home run, 2 RBI, and 5 walks. On July 30, Ríos was removed from the 40–man roster and sent outright to the Triple–A Iowa Cubs. He elected free agency on October 13.

=== Cincinnati Reds ===
On February 13, 2024, Ríos signed a minor league contract with the Cincinnati Reds organization. He was released by the organization on June 16, but re–signed with the Reds on a new minor league contract two days later. In 50 games for the Triple–A Louisville Bats, he hit .243/.340/.486 with 11 home runs and 27 RBI. On July 5, the Reds selected Ríos's contract, adding him to the major league roster. In five games for Cincinnati, he went 1–for–9 (.111) with a walk. Ríos was designated for assignment by the Reds on July 19. He cleared waivers and elected free agency the following day. Ríos re-signed with Cincinnati on a new minor league contract on July 23. He elected free agency following the season on November 4.

On February 1, 2025, Ríos re-signed with the Reds organization on a minor league contract. He made 130 appearances for Triple-A Louisville, batting .246/.337/.468 with 26 home runs and 94 RBI. Ríos elected free agency following the season on November 6.

=== Leones de Yucatán ===
On February 26, 2026, Ríos signed with the Leones de Yucatán of the Mexican League. In 29 appearances for the Leones, he batted .257/.369/.386 with two home runs and 13 RBI. On May 22, Ríos was released by Yucatán.

=== El Águila de Veracruz ===
On May 31, 2026, Ríos signed with El Águila de Veracruz of the Mexican League. In four games for the team, Ríos went 0-for-12 at the plate (.000) with 10 strikeouts. On June 12, Ríos was released by Veracruz.
