= Devin Mann =

American baseball player (born 1997)

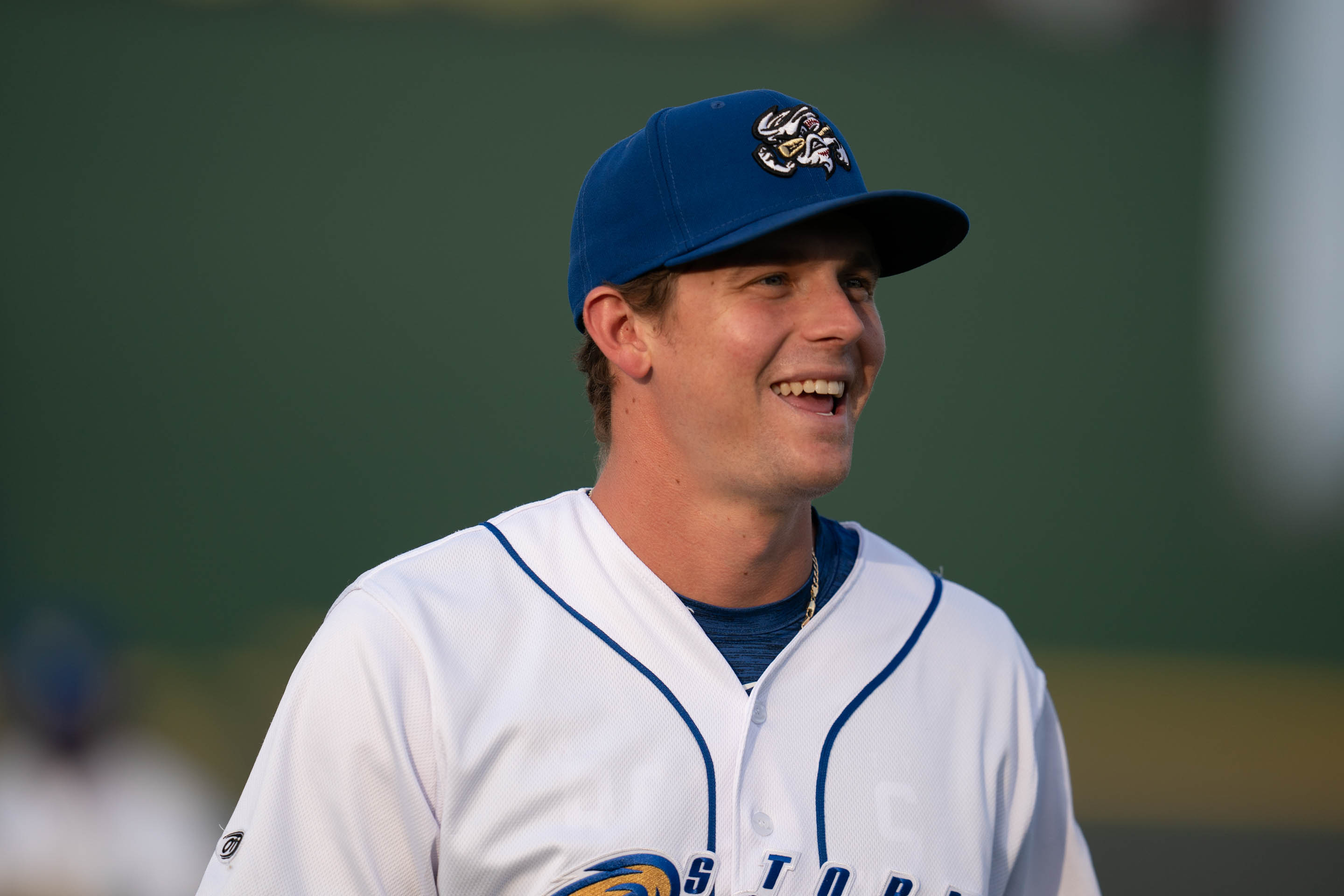
- Mann with the Omaha Storm Chasers in 2023

Free agent
- Second baseman
- Born: February 11, 1997 (age 29); Columbus, Indiana, U.S.
- Bats: Right Throws: Right

Devin Jacob Mann (born February 11, 1997) is an American professional baseball second baseman who is a free agent.

== Amateur career ==
Mann attended Columbus North High School in Columbus, Indiana, where he played baseball. In 2015, as a senior, he batted .410 with nine home runs, earning All-State honors. Undrafted in the 2015 Major League Baseball draft, he enrolled at the University of Louisville where he played college baseball.

In 2016, Mann's freshman season at Louisville, he played in 39 games, batting .303 with nine doubles and 17 RBI, earning a spot on the ACC All-Freshman team. That summer, he played in the New England Collegiate Baseball League with the Newport Gulls. As a sophomore at Louisville in 2017, Mann started 64 games, hitting .268 with eight home runs and 44 RBI. That summer, he played briefly in the Cape Cod Baseball League for the Orleans Firebirds. In 2018, his junior year, he slashed .303/.446/.504 with seven home runs, 52 RBI, and 15 stolen bases.

== Professional career ==
=== Los Angeles Dodgers ===
Mann was drafted by the Los Angeles Dodgers in the fifth round, with the 164th overall selection, of the 2018 Major League Baseball draft.

Mann signed with the Dodgers and made his professional debut with the Rookie-level Arizona League Dodgers before being promoted to the Great Lakes Loons of the Single-A Midwest League, where he finished the year. Over 65 games, he batted .240 with two home runs and thirty RBI. Mann spent 2019 with the Rancho Cucamonga Quakes of the High-A California League, with whom he was named an All-Star alongside being named the league's Player of the Month for June. Over 98 games with the Quakes for the year, Mann slashed .278/.358/.496 with 19 home runs and 63 RBI. He played in the Arizona Fall League for the Glendale Desert Dogs after the season. Mann did not play in a game in 2020 due to the cancellation of the minor league season because of the COVID-19 pandemic.

Mann was assigned to the Tulsa Drillers of the Double-A Central to begin the 2021 season, where he hit .244 with 14 home runs, 62 RBI, and 27 doubles over 110 appearances. He returned to Tulsa to begin the 2022 season before he was promoted to the Oklahoma City Dodgers of the Triple-A Pacific Coast League in early August. Between the two affiliates, Mann played in 118 games with a .264 batting average, 16 home runs, and 61 RBI. To open the 2023 season, he returned to Oklahoma City and slashed .307/.402/.541 with 14 home runs and 71 RBI.

=== Kansas City Royals ===
On August 1, 2023, Mann was traded with Derlin Figueroa to the Kansas City Royals in exchange for Ryan Yarbrough. He was assigned to the Omaha Storm Chasers of the Triple-A International League. Over 126 games between Oklahoma City and Omaha, Mann batted .276 with twenty home runs, 86 RBI, and 42 doubles.

Mann returned to Omaha for the 2024 season, making 101 appearances and batting .257/.358/.420 with 13 home runs and 52 RBI. He elected free agency following the season on November 4, 2024.

=== San Francisco Giants ===
On April 29, 2025, Mann signed a minor league contract with the San Francisco Giants. He made 64 appearances split between the Double-A Richmond Flying Squirrels and Triple-A Sacramento River Cats, hitting .224/.346/.336 with four home runs and 28 RBI. Mann was released by the Giants organization on August 5.
