= Tim Neverett =

American sportscaster (born 1966)

- Born: Timothy Joseph Neverett; March 19, 1966 (age 60); Nashua, New Hampshire, U.S.
- Education: Emerson College
- Sports commentary career
- Teams: Pittsburgh Pirates (2009–2015); Boston Red Sox (2016–2018); Los Angeles Dodgers (2019–present)
- Genre: Play-by-play
- Sport: Major League Baseball

Timothy Joseph Neverett (born March 19, 1966) is an American sportscaster who currently works as a television and radio play-by-play announcer for the Los Angeles Dodgers of Major League Baseball (MLB). He has previously worked as a play-by-play announcer for the Pittsburgh Pirates and Boston Red Sox. In addition to baseball, he has announced basketball and American football games, along with both the summer and winter Olympic Games.

== Career ==
At age 19, Neverett had a fill-in role as a play-by-play announcer for the Nashua Pirates, a Minor League Baseball team in New Hampshire. In 1992, Neverett moved to Las Vegas. He served as the play-by-play man for the San Diego Padres' and Los Angeles Dodgers' Triple-A affiliates. He also called International Hockey League games for the Las Vegas Thunder for five seasons. He called college baseball and football games for the UNLV Rebels.

Eventually, Neverett moved to Denver, where he worked for Fox Sports Rocky Mountain among other assignments. Neverett served in multiple capacities for FSN, providing play-by-play coverage and doing studio shows while also calling college football, basketball, lacrosse, hockey, track and field, arena football and filling in on Colorado Rockies telecasts. During this time, he was also hired to be one of the play-by-play announcers for college football and men's basketball for the MountainWest Sports Network and Versus. He also worked as a radio sports talk host at KLZ AM 560, hosted a weekend sports show for Sporting News Radio, and was the host of "This Week in the Mountain West" for the Mountain West Radio Network.

Neverett also announced events for four different Olympic Games on international television for Television New Zealand and One Sport, serving over 100 countries worldwide. He called baseball, softball, basketball and soccer during the 2004 Summer Olympics and the 2008 Summer Olympics as well as hockey and skiing events during the 2002 Winter Olympics and the 2006 Winter Olympics. Neverett has also covered the National Football League (NFL) and college football on the Sports USA Radio Network, and has called college basketball games for American Sports Network.

=== Pittsburgh Pirates ===
Neverett was hired as a play-by-play announcer for the Pittsburgh Pirates in 2009 and served in that role until the end of the 2015 season.

=== Boston Red Sox ===
For the 2016 through 2018 seasons, Neverett worked with Joe Castiglione to broadcast Boston Red Sox games on the Red Sox Radio Network; during this time, Neverett was an employee of WEEI-FM. On December 11, 2018, Neverett advised that he would be leaving the Red Sox radio broadcast team.

=== Los Angeles Dodgers ===
On December 17, 2018, the Los Angeles Dodgers announced that Neverett would join the team as television and radio play-by-play broadcaster for select games starting in 2019. He handles television play-by-play duties during lead announcer Joe Davis’ national assignments as well as back-up radio play-by-play duties.

He also handles most spring training broadcasts with former Dodger outfielder Rick Monday, simulcasting on Sportsnet LA and the Dodger Audio Network.

== Personal life ==
Neverett grew up in Nashua, New Hampshire and graduated from Emerson College in Boston, where he lettered in baseball for four seasons. He has three sons: Matt, Kyle and Drew.
