= Adam McCreery =

American baseball player (born 1992)

- Pitcher
- Born: December 31, 1992 (age 33); La Verne, California, U.S.
- Batted: Left Threw: Left

MLB debut
- August 9, 2018, for the Atlanta Braves

Last MLB appearance
- August 9, 2018, for the Atlanta Braves

MLB statistics
- Win–loss record: 0-0
- Earned run average: 18.00
- Strikeouts: 2
- Stats at Baseball Reference

Teams
- Atlanta Braves (2018)

Adam Glenn McCreery (born December 31, 1992) is an American former professional baseball pitcher. He has played in Major League Baseball (MLB) for the Atlanta Braves.

== Career ==
=== Amateur ===
McCreery attended Bonita High School in La Verne, California. He was drafted by the Minnesota Twins in the 14th round of the 2011 MLB draft, but did not sign and instead chose to play college baseball, first at Arizona State University for 2 seasons, then at Azusa Pacific University. In 2012, he played collegiate summer baseball with the Cotuit Kettleers of the Cape Cod Baseball League.

=== Atlanta Braves ===
He was then drafted by the Los Angeles Angels in the 22nd round of the 2014 MLB draft and signed. He made his professional debut that same season with the AZL Angels and spent the whole season there, going 1-1 with a 4.58 ERA in 19.2 innings pitched. He returned there in 2015 where he posted a 2.41 ERA in 18.2 innings pitched. He began 2016 in extended spring training.

In May 2016, the Angels traded McCreery to the Atlanta Braves for Jhoulys Chacín. He spent the season with both the Danville Braves and Rome Braves, pitching to a combined 2-3 record and 4.19 ERA in 22 relief appearances. In 2017, he pitched for Rome and the Florida Fire Frogs, compiling a combined 3-1 record and 2.74 ERA in 62.1 relief innings pitched.

The Braves added him to their 40-man roster after the 2017 season. He began 2018 with the Mississippi Braves. On August 5, 2018, McCreery joined the Gwinnett Stripers. He pitched in one International League game before a promotion to the major leagues on August 7. On August 9, 2018, McCreery made his major league debut against the Washington Nationals.

=== Los Angeles Dodgers ===
McCreery was traded to the Los Angeles Dodgers for cash considerations on November 28, 2018.

=== Los Angeles Angels ===
July 12, 2019, McCreery and Josh Thole were traded to the Los Angeles Angels in exchange for cash considerations. He was promoted to the major league roster on July 29, 2019 but one day later - July 30, 2019 - he was designated for assignment. McCreery was released on August 19.

=== Kansas City Monarchs ===
On February 22, 2021, McCreery signed with the Kansas City Monarchs of the American Association of Professional Baseball. However, he never appeared in a game for the club, and was released on August 25, 2021.
