= Rocky Gale =

American baseball player (born 1988)

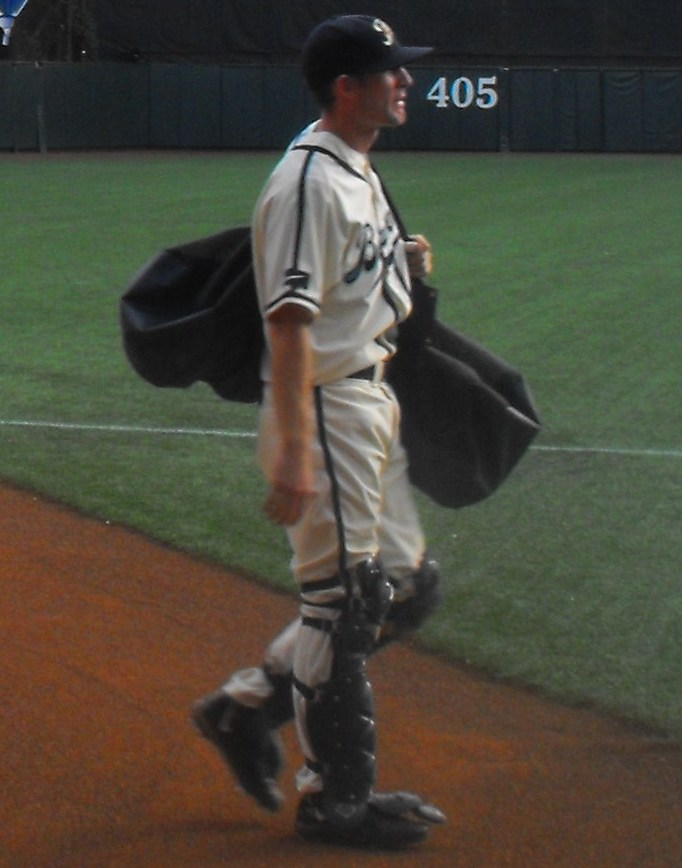
- Gale with the Portland Beavers in 2010
- Catcher
- Born: February 22, 1988 (age 38); Portland, Oregon, U.S.
- Batted: Right Threw: Right

MLB debut
- September 6, 2015, for the San Diego Padres

Last MLB appearance
- May 12, 2019, for the Los Angeles Dodgers

MLB statistics
- Batting average: .108
- Home runs: 1
- Runs batted in: 2
- Stats at Baseball Reference

Teams
- San Diego Padres (2015, 2017); Los Angeles Dodgers (2018–2019)

Rocky Michael Gale (born February 22, 1988) is an American former professional baseball catcher. He attended the University of Portland where he was named the West Coast Conference defensive player of the year before being drafted by the San Diego Padres in the 2010 MLB draft. He made his Major League Baseball (MLB) debut in 2015 for the Padres and also played in MLB for the Los Angeles Dodgers. He is currently a catching coordinator in the Dodgers farm system.

== Early life ==
Gale was born in Portland, Oregon on February 22, 1988. He grew up in Yoncalla, Oregon, later moving to Keizer, Oregon where he attended junior high school. After graduating from North Salem High School in Salem, Oregon, Gale was drafted by the Kansas City Royals in the 49^{th} round of the 2006 Major League Baseball draft, but did not sign. In 2006, Gale began attending the University of Portland where he played baseball with the Portland Pilots. Gale also played with the Corvallis Knights, a collegiate summer league team. Gale batted .254 during his freshman season, .261 in his sophomore season, .194 in his junior season and .347 in his senior as a member of the Pilots. After the season, he was named to the first-team all-West Coast Conference (WCC) team and was the conference's defensive player of the year. Gale was drafted by the San Diego Padres in the 24^{th} round of the 2010 Major League Baseball draft out of the University of Portland.

== Professional career ==
=== San Diego Padres ===
After being drafted by the Padres in 2010, Gale made his debut in professional baseball debut with the minor league Eugene Emeralds, a team which he grew up watching. During the season, Gale split playing time with the Emeralds other catcher, Emmanuel Quiles. Eugene manager Greg Riddoch said that Gale has a "tremendous makeup". Furthermore, Emeralds pitcher Dexter Carter commented that when working with Gale "he knows exactly what's going on". Gale's parents, who lived in the area, would drive to his games to watch him play. On the season, Gale batted .292 with 47 hits, five doubles and 16 runs batted in (RBIs) in 43 games played. He was called up to the Portland Beavers, who were members of the Triple-A Pacific Coast League (PCL), but did not play. On Labor Day 2011 Rocky hit his first Professional league home run.

In 2015, Gale played for the El Paso Chihuahuas of the PCL. The Padres promoted him to the major leagues on December 8, 2015. He hit his first major league home run in a 13–7 loss to the Arizona Diamondbacks on September 20, 2017. He was designated for assignment on February 20, 2018. He was released on February 22, 2018.

=== Los Angeles Dodgers ===
Gale signed a minor league contract with the Los Angeles Dodgers on February 25, 2018. He was assigned to the Oklahoma City Dodgers where he was selected to represent the Pacific Coast League at the Triple-A All-Star Game. The Dodgers called him up to the majors on September 2. He was outrighted off the roster on July 23, 2019.

=== Tampa Bay Rays ===
On July 31, 2019, Gale was traded to the Tampa Bay Rays in exchange for cash considerations. In 17 games for the Triple-A Durham Bulls, he batted .323/.344/.355 with no home runs and six RBI. Gale elected free agency following the season on November 4.

=== Los Angeles Dodgers (second stint) ===
Gale signed another minor league contract with the Los Angeles Dodgers on November 27, 2019. Gale did not play in a game in 2020 due to the cancellation of the minor league season because of the COVID-19 pandemic. He became a free agent on November 2, 2020.

=== Cincinnati Reds ===
On January 8, 2021, Gale signed a minor league contract with the Cincinnati Reds organization. Gale spent the 2021 season with the Triple-A Louisville Bats. He appeared in 26 games for Louisville, hitting .208 and driving in 3 runs. On October 2, Gale was released by the Reds.

== Personal life ==
Gale's father, Paul Gale, was a coach at Western Baptist College/Corban University in Salem, Oregon. He is currently a scout for the Houston Astros. Rocky Gale married his wife Leah in December 2009, after dating her since high school. His mother's name is Janice Gale, and he has two brothers, K. C. and Ross, and a sister, Hannah.
