= Brandon Lewis (baseball) =

American baseball player (born 1998)

Free agent
- Third baseman
- Born: October 23, 1998 (age 27); Granada Hills, California, U.S.
- Bats: Right Throws: Right

Brandon Michael Lewis (born October 23, 1998) is an American professional baseball third baseman who is a free agent.

== Career ==
=== Amateur ===
Lewis attended Bishop Alemany High School in Mission Hills, California. As a senior in 2016, he hit .366 with seven home runs. After high school, he enrolled at Los Angeles Pierce College where he batted .419 with nine home runs and 39 RBI in 2017 and .399 with 17 home runs and 55 RBI in 2018. Lewis transferred to the University of California, Irvine in 2019 where he batted .315 with 14 home runs and 54 RBI over 54 games.

=== Los Angeles Dodgers ===
Lewis was drafted by the Los Angeles Dodgers in the fourth round, with the 131st overall selection, of the 2019 Major League Baseball draft. Lewis signed with the Dodgers and spent his first professional season with the rookie–level Arizona League Dodgers, rookie–level Ogden Raptors, and Single–A Great Lakes Loons, batting .297 with 13 home runs and 46 RBI over 56 games.

Lewis did not play in a game in 2020 due to the cancellation of the minor league season because of the COVID-19 pandemic. In 2021, he split the year between the Single–A Rancho Cucamonga Quakes and Great Lakes, hitting .269 with thirty home runs and 86 RBI over 99 games. Lewis was assigned to the Double–A Tulsa Drillers for the 2022 season. Over 110 games, he batted .209 with 24 home runs and 71 RBI.

For the 2023 season, Lewis returned to Tulsa, where he hit .199 in 93 games with seven home runs and 30 RBI. He spent his third straight season with Tulsa in 2024, batting .208 with nine home runs and 39 RBI in 73 games. Lewis was released by the Dodgers organization on November 19, 2024.

=== Caliente de Durango ===
On April 16, 2025, Lewis signed with the Caliente de Durango of the Mexican League. In eight games for Durango, he went 3-for-18 (.167) with three walks. Lewis was released by the Caliente on April 30.

=== York Revolution ===
On May 7, 2025, Lewis signed with the York Revolution of the Atlantic League of Professional Baseball. In 105 appearances for the Revolution, he batted .255/.338/.429 with 15 home runs, 69 RBI, and nine stolen bases. With York, Lewis won the Atlantic League championship.

On April 8, 2026, Lewis re-signed with the Revolution. Across 44 games with York, he hit .347 with 19 home runs and 59 RBI. He hit 12 home runs in the month of May which was a Revolution record.

=== Philadelphia Phillies ===
On June 17, 2026, Lewis' contract was purchased by the Philadelphia Phillies organization. He made 29 appearances for the High–A Jersey Shore BlueClaws, batting .183/.271/.365 with five home runs and 15 RBI. Lewis was released by the Phillies on July 26.
