= 2019 San Francisco Giants season =

2019 San Francisco Giants
- League: National League
- Division: West
- Ballpark: Oracle Park
- City: San Francisco, California
- Record: 77–85 (.475)
- Divisional place: 3rd
- Owners: Charles B. Johnson (Majority shareholder); Greg E. Johnson (Chairman)
- President: Larry Baer
- President of baseball operations: Farhan Zaidi
- Managers: Bruce Bochy
- Television: KNTV (NBC Bay Area 11) (Jon Miller, Mike Krukow, Duane Kuiper, Amy Gutierrez); NBC Sports Bay Area (Duane Kuiper, Mike Krukow, Dave Flemming, Jon Miller, Shawn Estes, Javier López, Amy Gutierrez)
- Radio: KNBR (104.5 FM and 680 AM); San Francisco Giants Radio Network (Jon Miller, Dave Flemming, Duane Kuiper, Mike Krukow); KXZM (93.7 FM, Spanish) (Erwin Higueros, Tito Fuentes, Marvin Benard)
- Stats: ESPN.com; Baseball Reference

The 2019 season was the San Francisco Giants' 137th year in Major League Baseball and their 62nd year in San Francisco since their move from New York following the 1957 season. It was their 20th season at Oracle Park and the first under that name following the transfer of naming rights from AT&T. This season was the 13th and last for Bruce Bochy as manager of the Giants. It was the first season since at least 1901 that no Giants pitcher threw a 9 inning complete game. The Giants were officially eliminated from postseason contention for the third consecutive season after a loss to the Braves on September 20.

== Events ==
=== Offseason ===
- October 29, 2018 − The Giants exercised the 2019 contract option on LHP Madison Bumgarner and IF Pablo Sandoval.
- December 10, 2018 − The Giants claimed OF Mike Gerber off waivers from Detroit Tigers.
- December 21, 2018 − The Giants agreed to terms with P Pat Venditte.
- January 5, 2019 – The Giants acquired IF/OF Breyvic Valera in a trade with the Baltimore Orioles in exchange for cash considerations.
- January 14, 2019 – The Giants signed LHP Derek Holland to a one-year contract with a club option for 2020.
- January 23, 2019 – The Giants signed LHP Drew Pomeranz to a one-year contract.
- February 1, 2019 − The Giants claimed OF John Andreoli off waivers from Texas Rangers.
- February 5, 2019 – The Giants acquired RHP Jake Barrett in a trade with the Arizona Diamondbacks in exchange for cash considerations. OF John Andreoli was designated for assignment.
- February 12, 2019 − The Giants claimed RHP Jose Lopez off waivers from Cincinnati Reds. LHP Josh Osich was designated for assignment.
- February 13, 2019 – The Giants acquired RHP Trevor Gott in a trade with the Washington Nationals in exchange for cash considerations.
- February 22, 2019 − The Giants claimed IF Hanser Alberto off waivers from Baltimore Orioles. RHP Jake Barrett was designated for assignment.
- March 2, 2019 − The Giants claimed IF Merandy González off waivers from Miami Marlins.
- March 8, 2019 – The Giants acquired cash in a trade with the Detroit Tigers in exchange for minor leaguer C Cameron Rupp.
- March 21, 2019 – The Giants acquired IF/OF Connor Joe in a trade with the Cincinnati Reds in exchange for minor leaguer RHP Jordan Johnson and cash considerations. OF Drew Ferguson was designated for assignment.
- March 23, 2019 – The Giants acquired OF Michael Reed in a trade with the Minnesota Twins in exchange for OF John Andreoli and cash considerations. LHP Steven Okert was designated for assignment.
- March 23, 2019 – The Giants acquired cash in a trade with the Minnesota Twins in exchange for minor leaguer OF Matt Joyce.
- March 23, 2019 – The Giants acquired OF Mike Yastrzemski in a trade with the Baltimore Orioles in exchange for minor leaguer RHP Tyler Herb.
- March 24, 2019 – The Giants acquired C Erik Kratz in a trade with the Milwaukee Brewers in exchange for minor leaguer IF C. J. Hinojosa. RHP Jose Lopez was designated for assignment.

=== Regular season ===
- April 2, 2019 – The Giants acquired OF Kevin Pillar in a trade with the Toronto Blue Jays in exchange for minor leaguer RHP Juan De Paula and RHP Derek Law and INF Alen Hanson. OF Michael Reed was designated for assignment.
- April 8, 2019 – The Giants acquired 1B/OF Tyler Austin in a trade with the Minnesota Twins in exchange for minor leaguer OF Malique Ziegler. OF Connor Joe was designated for assignment.
- June 10, 2019 – The Giants acquired OF Alex Dickerson in a trade with the San Diego Padres in exchange for minor leaguer RHP Franklin van Gurp.
- July 26, 2019 – The Giants traded LHP Derek Holland to the Chicago Cubs in exchange for cash considerations.
- July 31, 2019 – The Giants acquired minor leaguers OF Jaylin Davis, RHP Kai-Wei Teng and RHP Prelander Berroa in a trade with the Minnesota Twins in exchange for RHP Sam Dyson.
- July 31, 2019 – The Giants acquired minor leaguer IF Mauricio Dubón in a trade with the Milwaukee Brewers in exchange for LHP Drew Pomeranz and RHP Ray Black.
- July 31, 2019 – The Giants acquired RHP Dan Winkler and minor leaguer RHP Tristan Beck in a trade with the Atlanta Braves in exchange for RHP Mark Melancon.
- July 31, 2019 – The Giants acquired 2B Scooter Gennett and cash considerations in a trade with the Cincinnati Reds in exchange for a player to be named later.
- August 6, 2019 – The Giants designated 2B Joe Panik for assignment.

== Season standings ==
=== National League West ===
NL West
Team	W	L	Pct.	GB	Home	Road
Los Angeles Dodgers	106	56	.654	—	59‍–‍22	47‍–‍34
Arizona Diamondbacks	85	77	.525	21	44‍–‍37	41‍–‍40
San Francisco Giants	77	85	.475	29	35‍–‍46	42‍–‍39
Colorado Rockies	71	91	.438	35	43‍–‍38	28‍–‍53
San Diego Padres	70	92	.432	36	36‍–‍45	34‍–‍47

=== National League Division Standings ===
Division leaders
Team	W	L	Pct.
Los Angeles Dodgers	106	56	.654
Atlanta Braves	97	65	.599
St. Louis Cardinals	91	71	.562

Wild Card teams (Top 2 teams qualify for postseason)
Team	W	L	Pct.	GB
Washington Nationals	93	69	.574	+4
Milwaukee Brewers	89	73	.549	—
New York Mets	86	76	.531	3
Arizona Diamondbacks	85	77	.525	4
Chicago Cubs	84	78	.519	5
Philadelphia Phillies	81	81	.500	8
San Francisco Giants	77	85	.475	12
Cincinnati Reds	75	87	.463	14
Colorado Rockies	71	91	.438	18
San Diego Padres	70	92	.432	19
Pittsburgh Pirates	69	93	.426	20
Miami Marlins	57	105	.352	32

=== Record vs. opponents ===
2019 National League record Source: MLB Standings Grid – 2019
Team	AZ	ATL	CHC	CIN	COL	LAD	MIA	MIL	NYM	PHI	PIT	SD	SF	STL	WSH	AL
Arizona	—	4–3	2–4	3–3	9–10	8–11	3–4	2–5	2–5	4–2	6–1	11–8	10–9	3–3	4–3	14–6
Atlanta	3–4	—	5–2	3–4	3–3	2–4	15–4	3–3	11–8	9–10	5–2	5–2	5–2	4–2	11–8	13–7
Chicago	4–2	2–5	—	8–11	3–3	3–4	6–1	9–10	5–2	2–5	11–8	4–3	4–2	9–10	2–4	12–8
Cincinnati	3–3	4–3	11–8	—	3–3	1–5	6–1	8–11	3–4	3–4	7–12	5–2	4–3	7–12	1–5	9–11
Colorado	10–9	3–3	3–3	3–3	—	4–15	5–2	5–2	2–4	3–4	2–5	11–8	7–12	2–5	3–4	8–12
Los Angeles	11–8	4–2	4–3	5–1	15–4	—	5–1	4–3	5–2	5–2	6–0	13–6	12–7	3–4	4–3	10–10
Miami	4–3	4–15	1–6	1–6	2–5	1–5	—	2–5	6–13	10–9	3–3	4–2	3–3	3–4	4–15	9–11
Milwaukee	5–2	3–3	10–9	11–8	2–5	3–4	5–2	—	5–1	4–3	15–4	3–4	2–4	9–10	4–2	8–12
New York	5–2	8–11	2–5	4–3	4–2	2–5	13–6	1–5	—	7–12	5–1	3–3	3–4	2–5	12–7	15–5
Philadelphia	2–4	10–9	5–2	4–3	4–3	2–5	9–10	3–4	12–7	—	4–2	3–3	3–4	4–2	5–14	11–9
Pittsburgh	1–6	2–5	8–11	12–7	5–2	0–6	3–3	4–15	1–5	2–4	—	6–1	5–2	5–14	3–4	12–8
San Diego	8–11	2–5	3–4	2–5	8–11	6–13	2–4	4–3	3–3	3–3	1–6	—	9–10	4–2	4–3	11–9
San Francisco	9–10	2–5	2–4	3–4	12–7	7–12	3–3	4–2	4–3	4–3	2–5	10–9	—	3–4	1–5	11–9
St. Louis	3–3	2–4	10–9	12–7	5–2	4–3	4–3	10–9	5–2	2–4	14–5	2–4	4–3	—	5–2	9–11
Washington	3–4	8–11	4–2	5–1	4–3	3–4	15–4	2–4	7–12	14–5	4–3	3–4	5–1	2–5	—	14–6

== Game log ==
2019 game log: 77–85 (Home: 35–46; Away: 42–39)
March: 1–3 (Home: 0–0; Away: 1–3)

#	Date	Opponent	Score	Win	Loss	Save	Attendance	Record
1	March 28	@ Padres	0–2	Lauer (1–0)	**Bumgarner** (0–1)	Yates (1)	44,655	0–1
2	March 29	@ Padres	1–4	Lucchesi (1–0)	**Holland** (0–1)	Yates (2)	33,769	0–2
3	March 30	@ Padres	3–2	**Rodríguez** (1–0)	Margevicius (0–1)	**Smith** (1)	41,899	1–2
4	March 31	@ Padres	1–3	Adam Warren (1–0)	**Vincent** (0–1)	Yates (3)	38,444	1–3

April: 11–15 (Home: 6–9; Away: 5–6)

#	Date	Opponent	Score	Win	Loss	Save	Attendance	Record
5	April 1	@ Dodgers	4–2	**Gott** (1–0)	Kelly (0–1)	**Smith** (2)	40,477	2–3
6	April 2	@ Dodgers	5–6	Ryu (2–0)	**Bumgarner** (0–2)	Jansen (2)	42,887	2–4
7	April 3	@ Dodgers	3–5	Alexander (1–0)	**Moronta** (0–1)	Jansen (3)	51,170	2–5
8	April 5	Rays	2–5	Glasnow (2–0)	**Rodríguez** (1–1)	Alvarado (3)	41,067	2–6
9	April 6	Rays	6–4	**Bergen** (1–0)	Yarbrough (1–1)	**Smith** (3)	31,828	3–6
10	April 7	Rays	0–3	Chirinos (2–0)	**Pomeranz** (0–1)	Alvarado (4)	31,574	3–7
11	April 8	Padres	5–6	Lauer (2–1)	**Moronta** (0–2)	Yates (6)	28,625	3–8
12	April 9	Padres	7–2	**Holland** (1–1)	Lucchesi (2–1)	–	28,506	4–8
13	April 10	Padres	1–3	Margevicius (1–1)	**Rodríguez** (1–2)	Yates (7)	28,584	4–9
14	April 11	Rockies	1–0	**Samardzija** (1–0)	Gray (0–3)	**Smith** (4)	29,727	5–9
15	April 12	Rockies	3–2 (18)	**Bergen** (2–0)	Johnson (0–1)	–	33,616	6–9
16	April 13	Rockies	5–2	**Bumgarner** (1–2)	Freeland (1–3)	**Dyson** (1)	32,607	7–9
17	April 14	Rockies	0–4	Márquez (2–1)	**Holland** (1–2)	–	35,513	7–10
18	April 16	@ Nationals	7–3	**Rodríguez** (2–2)	Strasburg (1–1)	–	22,334	8–10
19	April 17	@ Nationals	6–9	Hellickson (2–0)	**Samardzija** (1–1)	–	22,611	8–11
20	April 18	@ Nationals	2–4	Corbin (1–0)	**Pomeranz** (0–2)	Doolittle (2)	26,085	8–12
21	April 19	@ Pirates	1–4	Lyles (2–0)	**Bumgarner** (1–3)	Vázquez (6)	15,049	8–13
22	April 20	@ Pirates	1–3 (5)	Taillon (1–2)	**Holland** (1–3)	–	17,663	8–14
23	April 21	@ Pirates	3–2	**Rodríguez** (3–2)	Archer (1–1)	**Smith** (5)	12,396	9–14
24	April 23	@ Blue Jays	7–6	**Samardzija** (2–1)	Thornton (0–3)	**Smith** (6)	20,384	10–14
25	April 24	@ Blue Jays	4–0	**Pomeranz** (1–2)	Buchholz (0–1)	–	19,652	11–14
26	April 26	Yankees	3–7	Paxton (3–2)	**Bumgarner** (1–4)	–	34,950	11–15
27	April 27	Yankees	4–6	Happ (1–2)	**Holland** (1–4)	Chapman (5)	33,971	11–16
28	April 28	Yankees	5–11	Germán (5–1)	**Rodríguez** (3–3)	–	34,540	11–17
29	April 29	Dodgers	3–2	**Dyson** (1–0)	Stripling (1–2)	**Smith** (7)	32,212	12–17
30	April 30	Dodgers	3–10	Buehler (3–0)	**Pomeranz** (1–3)	–	32,017	12–18

May: 10–16 (Home: 4–9; Away: 6–7)

#	Date	Opponent	Score	Win	Loss	Save	Attendance	Record
31	May 1	Dodgers	2–1	**Smith** (1–0)	Urías (2–2)	–	31,960	13–18
32	May 3	@ Reds	12–11 (11)	**Moronta** (1–2)	Hughes (2–1)	**Smith** (8)	23,478	14–18
33	May 4	@ Reds	2–9	Roark (2–1)	**Rodríguez** (3–4)	–	24,104	14–19
34	May 5	@ Reds	6–5	**Watson** (1–0)	Iglesias (1–5)	**Smith** (9)	23,654	15–19
35	May 6	@ Reds	4–12	DeSclafani (2–1)	**Pomeranz** (1–4)	–	19,476	15–20
36	May 7	@ Rockies	14–4	**Bumgarner** (2–4)	Senzatela (2–2)	–	21,707	16–20
37	May 8	@ Rockies	11–12	Shaw (2–0)	**Beede** (0–1)	Davis (6)	25,368	16–21
–	May 9	@ Rockies	Postponed (rain): Makeup date July 15					
38	May 10	Reds	0–7	Castillo (4–1)	**Rodríguez** (3–5)	–	32,191	16–22
39	May 11	Reds	4–5	Garrett (2–1)	**Moronta** (1–3)	Iglesias (8)	32,829	16–23
40	May 12	Reds	6–5	**Watson** (2–0)	Hernandez (0–2)	**Smith** (10)	35,824	17–23
41	May 14	Blue Jays	3–7	Thornton (1–4)	**Vincent** (0–2)	–	31,230	17–24
42	May 15	Blue Jays	4–3	**Melancon** (1–0)	Tepera (0–2)	**Smith** (11)	31,828	18–24
43	May 17	@ Diamondbacks	0–7	Kelly (4–4)	**Samardzija** (2–2)	–	26,806	18–25
44	May 18	@ Diamondbacks	8–5	**Bumgarner** (3–4)	Godley (1–4)	–	25,014	19–25
45	May 19	@ Diamondbacks	3–2 (10)	**Dyson** (2–0)	Hirano (1–2)	**Smith** (12)	24,061	20–25
46	May 20	Braves	1–4	Soroka (5–1)	**Suárez** (0–1)	Newcomb (1)	29,815	20–26
47	May 21	Braves	4–3	**Gott** (2–0)	Jackson (2–1)		28,030	21–26
48	May 22	Braves	2–9	Fried (7–2)	**Samardzija** (2–3)		31,402	21–27
49	May 23	Braves	4–5 (13)	Jackson (3–1)	**Moronta** (1–4)		32,463	21–28
50	May 24	Diamondbacks	2–18	Ray (4–1)	**Pomeranz** (1–5)	Godley (2)	31,777	21–29
51	May 25	Diamondbacks	4–10	Clarke (1–1)	**Suárez** (0–2)	–	31,531	21–30
52	May 26	Diamondbacks	2–6	Weaver (4–3)	**Anderson** (0–1)	Holland (9)	37,017	21–31
53	May 28	@ Marlins	3–11	Richards (2–5)	**Samardzija** (2–4)	–	6,407	21–32
54	May 29	@ Marlins	2–4	Anderson (2–2)	**Bumgarner** (3–5)	Romo (11)	6,487	21–33
55	May 30	@ Marlins	3–1	**Moronta** (2–4)	Conley (1–5)	**Smith** (13)	7,371	22–33
56	May 31	@ Orioles	6–9	Cashner (6–2)	**Pomeranz** (1–6)	Bleier (2)	17,545	22–34

June: 14–13 (Home: 8–7; Away: 6–6)

#	Date	Opponent	Score	Win	Loss	Save	Attendance	Record
57	June 1	@ Orioles	8–2	**Anderson** (1–1)	Hess (1–7)	—	19,352	23–34
58	June 2	@ Orioles	8–1	**Samardzija** (3–4)	Ynoa (0–2)	—	16,991	24–34
59	June 4	@ Mets	9–3 (10)	**Melancon** (2–0)	Gsellman (1–1)	—	24,878	25–34
60	June 5	@ Mets	0–7	Vargas (2–3)	**Beede** (0–2)	—	23,357	25–35
61	June 6	@ Mets	3–7	Lugo (3–0)	**Melancon** (2–1)	—	28,857	25–36
62	June 7	Dodgers	2–1	**Moronta** (3–4)	Kershaw (5–1)	**Smith** (14)	35,157	26–36
63	June 8	Dodgers	2–7	Hill (3–1)	**Samardzija** (3–5)	—	37,784	26–37
64	June 9	Dodgers	0–1	Buehler (7–1)	**Bumgarner** (3–6)	Jansen (19)	34,098	26–38
65	June 11	Padres	6–5	**Melancon** (3–1)	Wingenter (0–1)	**Smith** (15)	28,535	27–38
66	June 12	Padres	4–2	**Anderson** (2–1)	Lucchesi (5–4)	**Smith** (16)	31,188	28–38
67	June 14	Brewers	5–3	**Pomeranz** (2–6)	Davies (7–1)	**Smith** (17)	35,106	29–38
68	June 15	Brewers	8–7	**Gott** (3–0)	Guerra (2–1)	**Smith** (18)	34,560	30–38
69	June 16	Brewers	3–5	Albers (3–2)	**Samardzija** (3–6)	Hader (17)	34,603	30–39
70	June 17	@ Dodgers	3–2	**Beede** (1–2)	Maeda (7–4)	**Smith** (19)	42,479	31–39
71	June 18	@ Dodgers	0–9	Kershaw (7–1)	**Anderson** (2–2)		48,219	31–40
72	June 19	@ Dodgers	2–9	Floro (2–1)	**Pomeranz** (2–7)	—	43,802	31–41
73	June 20	@ Dodgers	8–9	Chargois (1–0)	**Bumgarner** (3–7)	Jansen (22)	43,724	31–42
74	June 21	@ Diamondbacks	11–5	**Samardzija** (4–6)	Clarke (1–3)	—	29,312	32–42
75	June 22	@ Diamondbacks	7–4	**Gott** (4–0)	Godley (3–5)	**Smith** (20)	32,082	33–42
76	June 23	@ Diamondbacks	2–3 (10)	Andriese (4–4)	**Melancon** (3–2)	—	25,071	33–43
77	June 24	Rockies	0–2	Gray (8–5)	**Pomeranz** (2–8)	Davis (10)	30,018	33–44
78	June 25	Rockies	4–2	**Bumgarner** (4–7)	Gonzalez (0–1)	**Smith** (21)	31,458	34–44
79	June 26	Rockies	3–6	Márquez (8–3)	**Samardzija** (4–7)	Davis (11)	33,765	34–45
80	June 27	Diamondbacks	1–5	Young (1–0)	**Beede** (1–3)	—	30,790	34–46
81	June 28	Diamondbacks	6–3	**Anderson** (3–2)	Kelly (7–8)	—	35,391	35–46
82	June 29	Diamondbacks	3–4	Greinke (9–3)	**Dyson** (2–1)	Holland (12)	31,600	35–47
83	June 30	Diamondbacks	10–4	**Bumgarner** (5–7)	Ray (5–6)	—	31,778	36–47

July: 19–6 (Home: 7–3; Away: 12–3)

#	Date	Opponent	Score	Win	Loss	Save	Attendance	Record
84	July 1	@ Padres	13–2	**Samardzija** (5–7)	Allen (2–1)	—	25,274	37–47
85	July 2	@ Padres	10–4	**Beede** (2–3)	Strahm (3–7)	—	24,007	38–47
86	July 3	@ Padres	7–5	**Gott** (5–0)	Perdomo (1–1)	**Smith** (22)	33,905	39–47
87	July 5	Cardinals	4–9	Hudson (7–4)	**Pomeranz** (2–9)	—	37,603	39–48
88	July 6	Cardinals	8–4	**Dyson** (3–1)	Mikolas (5–9)	—	32,487	40–48
89	July 7	Cardinals	1–0	**Samardzija** (6–7)	Flaherty (4–6)	**Smith** (23)	33,841	41–48
–	July 9	**90th All-Star Game in Cleveland, OH**						
90	July 12	@ Brewers	10–7 (10)	**Smith** (2–0)	Albers (4–3)	—	40,186	42–48
91	July 13	@ Brewers	4–5	Jeffress (3–2)	**Moronta** (3–5)	—	42,324	42–49
92	July 14	@ Brewers	8–3	**Beede** (3–3)	Burnes (1–5)	—	43,259	43–49
93	July 15	@ Rockies	19–2	**Samardzija** (7–7)	Márquez (8–5)	—	26,434	44–49
94	July 15	@ Rockies	2–1	**Rodríguez** (4–5)	Gonzalez (0–2)	**Smith** (24)	34,424	45–49
95	July 16	@ Rockies	8–4 (10)	**Smith** (3–0)	Davis (1–4)	—	47,413	46–49
96	July 17	@ Rockies	11–8	**Holland** (2–4)	Gray (9–7)	**Melancon** (1)	40,157	47–49
97	July 18	Mets	3–2 (16)	**Jerez** (1–0)	Mazza (0–1)	—	36,862	48–49
98	July 19	Mets	1–0 (10)	**Dyson** (4–1)	Rhame (0–1)	—	32,861	49–49
99	July 20	Mets	4–11	Lockett (1–1)	**Samardzija** (7–8)	—	33,860	49–50
100	July 21	Mets	3–2 (12)	**Gott** (6–0)	Gsellman (1–2)	—	35,406	50–50
101	July 22	Cubs	5–4	**Gott** (7–0)	Strop (2–4)	**Dyson** (2)	37,119	51–50
102	July 23	Cubs	5–4 (13)	**Coonrod** (1–0)	Brach (3–3)	—	39,747	52–50
103	July 24	Cubs	1–4	Ryan (3–1)	**Beede** (3–4)	Kimbrel (7)	37,746	52–51
104	July 26	@ Padres	2–1 (11)	**Melancon** (4–2)	Allen (2–3)	**Smith** (25)	41,951	53–51
105	July 27	@ Padres	1–5	Quantrill (4–2)	**Anderson** (3–3)	—	41,371	53–52
106	July 28	@ Padres	7–6	**Bumgarner** (6–7)	Perdomo (1–3)	**Smith** (26)	35,087	54–52
107	July 30	@ Phillies	2–4	Smyly (2–5)	**Beede** (3–5)	Neris (19)	32,217	54–53
108	July 31	@ Phillies	5–1	**Samardzija** (8–8)	Velasquez (3–6)	—	31,313	55–53

August: 11–16 (Home: 5–9; Away: 6–7)

#	Date	Opponent	Score	Win	Loss	Save	Attendance	Record
109	August 1	@ Phillies	2–10	Álvarez (2–2)	**Rodríguez** (4–6)	—	28,524	55–54
110	August 2	@ Rockies	4–5	Díaz (4–2)	**Moronta** (3–6)	Oberg (4)	40,672	55–55
111	August 3	@ Rockies	6–5	**Coonrod** (2–0)	Estévez (1–2)	**Smith** (27)	47,540	56–55
112	August 4	@ Rockies	3–9	Freeland (3–9)	**Beede** (3–6)	—	40,084	56–56
113	August 5	Nationals	0–4	Fedde (2–2)	**Samardzija** (8–9)	—	32,366	56–57
114	August 6	Nationals	3–5	Sánchez (7–6)	**Menez** (0–1)	Doolittle (25)	31,628	56–58
115	August 7	Nationals	1–4	Ross (2–3)	**Anderson** (3–4)	—	30,958	56–59
116	August 8	Phillies	5–0	**Bumgarner** (7–7)	Nola (10–3)	—	37,667	57–59
117	August 9	Phillies	6–9	Álvarez (3–2)	**Watson** (2–1)	Neris (20)	36,275	57–60
118	August 10	Phillies	3–1	**Samardzija** (9–9)	Velasquez (4–7)	**Smith** (28)	39,106	58–60
119	August 11	Phillies	9–6	**Smith** (4–0)	Álvarez (3–3)	—	36,637	59–60
120	August 13	Athletics	3–2	**Bumgarner** (8–7)	Anderson (10–8)	**Smith** (29)	36,663	60–60
121	August 14	Athletics	5–9	Bailey (10–8)	**Beede** (3–7)	Hendriks (13)	39,511	60–61
122	August 15	@ Diamondbacks	7–0	**Rodríguez** (5–6)	Young (4–3)	—	19,037	61–61
123	August 16	@ Diamondbacks	10–9 (11)	**Smith** (5–0)	Lopez (1–5)	**Gott** (1)	23,642	62–61
124	August 17	@ Diamondbacks	11–6	**Webb** (1–0)	Clarke (4–4)	—	35,366	63–61
125	August 18	@ Diamondbacks	1–6	Kelly (9–12)	**Bumgarner** (8–8)	—	26,079	63–62
126	August 20	@ Cubs	3–5	Hamels (7–4)	**Abad** (0–1)	Kimbrel (10)	36,969	63–63
127	August 21	@ Cubs	11–12	Kintzler (3–2)	**Moronta** (6–2)	Kimbrel (11)	38,619	63–64
128	August 22	@ Cubs	0–1	Hendricks (9–9)	**Samardzija** (9–10)	Wick (2)	36,366	63–65
129	August 24	@ Athletics	10–5	**Coonrod** (3–0)	Petit (3–3)	—	53,367	64–65
130	August 25	@ Athletics	5–4	**Coonrod** (4–0)	Diekman (1–7)	**Smith** (30)	47,321	65–65
131	August 26	Diamondbacks	4–6	Young (6–3)	**Beede** (3–8)	Bradley (8)	29,169	65–66
132	August 27	Diamondbacks	2–3	Leake (10–10)	**Coonrod** (4–1)	Bradley (9)	28,262	65–67
133	August 29	Padres	3–5	Paddack (8–7)	**Rodríguez** (5–7)	Muñoz (1)	33,135	65–68
134	August 30	Padres	8–3	**Bumgarner** (9–8)	Lamet (2–3)	—	34,293	66–68
135	August 31	Padres	1–4	Stammen (7–6)	**Watson** (2–2)	Yates (39)	36,424	66–69

September: 11–16 (Home: 5–9; Away: 6–7)

#	Date	Opponent	Score	Win	Loss	Save	Attendance	Record
136	September 1	Padres	4–8	Lauer (8–8)	**Samardzija** (9–11)	—	38,701	66–70
137	September 2	@ Cardinals	1–3	Wainwright (10–9)	**Beede** (3–9)	Martínez (17)	40,732	66–71
138	September 3	@ Cardinals	0–1	Flaherty (9–7)	**Rodríguez** (5–8)	Martínez (18)	38,259	66–72
139	September 4	@ Cardinals	9–8	**Rogers** (1–0)	Gallegos (3–2)	**Smith** (31)	41,945	67–72
140	September 5	@ Cardinals	0–10	Hudson (15–6)	**Webb** (1–1)	Cabrera (1)	36,800	67–73
141	September 6	@ Dodgers	5–4	**Samardzija** (10–11)	Kershaw (13–5)	**Smith** (32)	53,317	68–73
142	September 7	@ Dodgers	1–0	**Beede** (4–9)	Gonsolin (2–2)	**Gustave** (1)	53,870	69–73
143	September 8	@ Dodgers	0–5	Maeda (9–8)	**Rodríguez** (5–9)	—	52,310	69–74
144	September 9	Pirates	4–6	Rodríguez (4–5)	**Abad** (0–2)	Vazquez (26)	26,826	69–75
145	September 10	Pirates	5–4	**Cueto** (1–0)	Keller (1–4)	**Anderson** (1)	26,877	70–75
146	September 11	Pirates	3–6	Feliz (3–4)	**Webb** (1–2)	Vázquez (27)	26,627	70–76
147	September 12	Pirates	2–4	Musgrove (10–12)	**Samardzija** (10–12)	Vazquez (28)	30,918	70–77
148	September 13	Marlins	1–0	**Beede** (5–9)	Alcántara (5–13)	**Anderson** (2)	33,418	71–77
149	September 14	Marlins	2–4	García (3–1)	**Anderson** (3–5)	Ureña (2)	38,663	71–78
150	September 15	Marlins	2–1	**Rogers** (2–0)	García (3–2)	**Smith** (33)	39,663	72–78
151	September 17	@ Red Sox	7–6 (15)	**Rodríguez** (6–9)	Kelley (0–2)	—	35,925	73–78
152	September 18	@ Red Sox	11–3	**Samardzija** (11–12)	Chacin (3–11)	—	35,697	74–78
153	September 19	@ Red Sox	4–5	Rodríguez (18–6)	**Bumgarner** (9–9)	Workman (15)	35,816	74–79
154	September 20	@ Braves	0–6	Foltynewicz (8–5)	**Beede** (5–10)	—	37,419	74–80
155	September 21	@ Braves	1–8	Fried (17–6)	**Cueto** (1–1)	—	40,899	74–81
156	September 22	@ Braves	4–1	**Webb** (2–2)	Keuchel (8–7)	**Smith** (34)	33,674	75–81
157	September 24	Rockies	5–8 (16)	Howard (2–0)	**Rodríguez** (6–10)	Shaw (1)	27,870	75–82
158	September 25	Rockies	2–1	**Smith** (6–0)	Johnson (0–2)	—	29,175	76–82
159	September 26	Rockies	8–3	**Coonrod** (5–1)	Tinoco (0–3)	—	30,350	77–82
160	September 27	Dodgers	2–9	Buehler (14–4)	**Cueto** (1–2)	—	36,554	77–83
161	September 28	Dodgers	0–2	Ryu (14–5)	**Webb** (2–3)	Jansen (33)	37,518	77–84
162	September 29	Dodgers	0–9	May (2–3)	**Rodríguez** (6–11)	—	41,909	77–85

Legend: = Win = Loss = Postponement
Bold = Giants team member

== Roster ==
2019 San Francisco Giants
Roster
Pitchers: 50 Fernando Abad; 64 Shaun Anderson; 45 Kyle Barraclough; 38 Tyler Beede; 60 Travis Bergen; 50 Ty Blach; 62 Ray Black; 40 Madison Bumgarner; 65 Sam Coonrod; 47 Johnny Cueto; 49 Sam Dyson; 75 Enderson Franco; 58 Trevor Gott; 74 Jandel Gustave; 45 Derek Holland; 63 Williams Jerez; 41 Mark Melancon; 51 Conner Menez; 54 Reyes Moronta; 60 Wandy Peralta; 37 Drew Pomeranz; 57 Dereck Rodríguez; 71 Tyler Rogers; 29 Jeff Samardzija; 67 Sam Selman; 61 Burch Smith; 13 Will Smith; 59 Andrew Suárez; 46 Pat Venditte; 61 Nick Vincent; 56 Tony Watson; 62 Logan Webb	Catchers: 16 Aramis Garcia; 5 Erik Kratz; 28 Buster Posey; 21 Stephen Vogt; Infielders: 14 Cristhian Adames; 2 Abiatal Avelino; 9 Brandon Belt; 35 Brandon Crawford; 19 Mauricio Dubón; 14 Scooter Gennett; 68 Zach Green; 46 Corban Joseph; 10 Evan Longoria; 12 Joe Panik; 48 Pablo Sandoval; 26 Chris Shaw; 7 Donovan Solano; 26 Yangervis Solarte	Outfielders: 19 Tyler Austin; 49 Jaylin Davis; 8 Alex Dickerson; 6 Steven Duggar; 34 Mike Gerber; 18 Connor Joe; 8 Gerardo Parra; 1 Kevin Pillar; 52 Michael Reed; 37 Joey Rickard; 53 Austin Slater; 51 Mac Williamson; 5 Mike Yastrzemski; Other batters: 8 Aaron Altherr	Manager: 15 Bruce Bochy; Coaches: 17 José Alguacil (first base); 21 Shawon Dunston (special assistant); 77 Matt Herges (bullpen); 31 Hensley Meulens (bench); 33 Alonzo Powell (hitting); 39 Rick Schu (assistant hitting); 99 Taira Uematsu (bullpen catcher); 66 Brant Whiting (bullpen catcher); 23 Ron Wotus (third base); 43 Curt Young (pitching)

== Player stats ==
=== Batting ===
Note: G = Games played; AB = At bats; R = Runs; H = Hits; 2B = Doubles; 3B = Triples; HR = Home runs; RBI = Runs batted in; SB = Stolen bases; BB = Walks; AVG = Batting average; SLG = Slugging average

Player	G	AB	R	H	2B	3B	HR	RBI	SB	BB	AVG	SLG
Kevin Pillar	156	595	82	157	37	3	21	87	14	18	.264	.442
Brandon Belt	156	526	76	123	32	3	17	57	4	83	.234	.403
Brandon Crawford	147	500	58	114	24	2	11	59	3	53	.228	.350
Evan Longoria	129	453	59	115	19	2	20	69	3	43	.254	.437
Buster Posey	114	405	43	104	24	0	7	38	0	34	.257	.368
Mike Yastrzemski	107	371	64	101	22	3	21	55	2	32	.272	.518
Joe Panik	103	344	33	81	17	1	3	27	4	36	.235	.317
Pablo Sandoval	108	272	42	73	23	0	14	41	1	18	.268	.507
Steven Duggar	73	261	26	61	12	2	4	28	1	16	.234	.341
Stephen Vogt	99	255	30	67	24	2	10	40	3	20	.263	.490
Donovan Solano	81	215	27	71	13	1	4	23	0	10	.330	.456
Austin Slater	68	168	20	40	9	3	5	21	1	22	.238	.417
Alex Dickerson	56	155	28	45	13	3	6	26	1	13	.290	.529
Tyler Austin	70	130	24	24	2	1	8	20	1	17	.185	.400
Mauricio Dubón	28	104	12	29	5	0	4	9	3	5	.279	.442
Gerardo Parra	30	86	8	17	3	0	1	6	2	8	.198	.267
Yangervis Solarte	28	73	9	15	5	0	1	7	0	4	.205	.315
Scooter Gennett	21	64	11	15	4	0	2	6	0	1	.234	.391
Mac Williamson	15	51	3	6	1	0	1	7	2	5	.118	.196
Joey Rickard	26	50	4	14	2	0	1	4	1	4	.280	.380
Jaylin Davis	17	42	2	7	0	0	1	3	1	3	.167	.238
Aramis Garcia	18	42	5	6	1	0	2	5	0	4	.143	.310
Erik Kratz	15	32	1	4	2	0	1	3	0	2	.125	.281
Mike Gerber	12	24	0	1	1	0	0	0	0	2	.042	.083
Cristhian Adames	10	22	1	7	1	0	0	2	0	2	.318	.364
Chris Shaw	16	18	0	1	0	0	0	0	0	2	.056	.056
Corban Joseph	8	16	0	1	0	0	0	2	0	1	.063	.063
Connor Joe	8	15	1	1	0	0	0	0	0	1	.067	.067
Zach Green	8	14	1	2	1	0	0	1	0	2	.143	.214
Michael Reed	4	8	0	0	0	0	0	0	0	0	.000	.000
Abiatal Avelino	4	7	0	2	0	0	0	1	0	1	.286	.286
Aaron Altherr	1	1	0	0	0	0	0	0	0	0	.000	.000
Pitcher totals	162	260	8	28	3	0	2	8	0	13	.108	.142
Team totals	162	5579	678	1332	300	26	167	655	47	475	.239	.392

=== Pitching ===
Note: W = Wins; L = Losses; ERA = Earned run average; G = Games pitched; GS = Games started; SV = Saves; IP = Innings pitched; H = Hits allowed; R = Runs allowed; ER = Earned runs allowed; BB = Walks allowed; SO = Strikeouts

Player	W	L	ERA	G	GS	SV	IP	H	R	ER	BB	SO
Madison Bumgarner	9	9	3.90	34	34	0	207.2	191	99	90	43	203
Jeff Samardzija	11	12	3.52	32	32	0	181.1	152	78	71	49	140
Tyler Beede	5	10	5.08	24	22	0	117.0	127	70	66	46	113
Dereck Rodríguez	6	11	5.64	28	16	0	99.0	108	74	62	36	71
Shaun Anderson	3	5	5.44	28	16	2	96.0	111	61	58	38	70
Drew Pomeranz	2	9	5.68	21	17	0	77.2	89	51	49	36	92
Derek Holland	2	4	5.90	31	7	0	68.2	68	49	45	35	71
Will Smith	6	0	2.76	63	0	34	65.1	46	20	20	21	96
Reyes Moronta	3	7	2.86	56	0	0	56.2	41	19	18	33	70
Tony Watson	2	2	4.17	60	0	0	54.0	56	26	25	12	41
Trevor Gott	7	0	4.44	50	0	1	52.2	41	26	26	17	57
Sam Dyson	4	1	2.47	49	0	2	51.0	39	17	14	7	47
Mark Melancon	4	2	3.50	43	0	1	46.1	49	19	18	16	44
Logan Webb	2	3	5.22	8	8	0	39.2	44	25	23	14	37
Andrew Suárez	0	2	5.79	21	2	0	32.2	39	23	21	14	25
Nick Vincent	0	2	5.58	18	1	0	30.2	36	20	19	8	30
Sam Coonrod	5	1	3.58	33	0	0	27.2	19	11	11	15	20
Jandel Gustave	0	0	2.96	23	0	1	24.1	18	11	8	9	14
Travis Bergen	2	0	5.49	21	0	0	19.2	18	12	12	9	18
Tyler Rogers	2	0	1.02	17	0	0	17.2	12	3	2	3	16
Conner Menez	0	1	5.29	8	3	0	17.0	13	10	10	12	22
Johnny Cueto	1	2	5.06	4	4	0	16.0	11	9	9	9	13
Fernando Abad	0	2	4.15	21	0	0	13.0	9	6	6	3	9
Sam Selman	0	0	4.35	10	0	0	10.1	6	5	5	6	10
Burch Smith	0	0	2.08	10	0	0	8.2	10	3	2	4	6
Kyle Barraclough	0	0	2.25	10	0	0	8.0	5	3	2	9	10
Williams Jerez	1	0	2.70	6	0	0	6.2	7	2	2	6	4
Ty Blach	0	0	14.21	2	0	0	6.1	14	10	10	4	3
Wandy Peralta	0	0	3.18	8	0	0	5.2	4	2	2	1	5
Enderson Franco	0	0	3.38	5	0	0	5.1	4	2	2	1	4
Pat Venditte	0	0	16.20	2	0	0	3.1	4	6	6	2	2
Ray Black	0	0	4.50	2	0	0	2.0	4	1	1	1	5
Pablo Sandoval	0	0	0.00	1	0	0	1.0	0	0	0	0	0
Team totals	77	85	4.38	162	162	41	1469.0	1395	773	715	519	1368

== Farm system ==
Level	Team	League	Manager
AAA	Sacramento River Cats	Pacific Coast League	
AA	Richmond Flying Squirrels	Eastern League	
A-Advanced	San Jose Giants	California League	
A	Augusta GreenJackets	South Atlantic League	
A-Short Season	Salem-Keizer Volcanoes	Northwest League	
Rookie	AZL Giants	Arizona League	
Rookie	DSL Giants	Dominican Summer League	
