= 2011 Major League Baseball draft =

Major League Draft

General information
- Date: June 6–8, 2011
- Location: Secaucus, New Jersey
- Network: MLB Network

Overview
- 1,530 total selections
- First selection: Gerrit Cole; Pittsburgh Pirates
- First round selections: 60

The 2011 Major League Baseball draft was held from June 6 through June 8, 2011, from Studio 42 of the MLB Network in Secaucus, New Jersey. The Pittsburgh Pirates selected Gerrit Cole out of the University of California, Los Angeles (UCLA), with the first overall pick.

== Draft order ==
The draft order was determined by the 2010 Major League Baseball season standings. The Pittsburgh Pirates received the first pick after having the worst record in 2010.

The Arizona Diamondbacks, San Diego Padres, and Milwaukee Brewers each received a compensation pick for failing to sign draft picks from the 2010 draft. Also, teams lost draft picks for signing certain free agents, while teams losing free agents received draft picks as compensation. The Elias Sports Bureau ranks all players based on performance over the past two seasons, with the top 20% being considered "Type A" and the next 20% considered "Type B". If a team offers a Type A free agent arbitration and he signs with another club, the player's former team obtains the new team's first- or second-round pick, depending on whether the new team is in the top 15 or bottom 15 in won–loss records in 2011, as well as a supplemental pick after the first round. If a team offers a Class B free agent arbitration and he signs with another club, the former team gets a supplemental pick after the first round.

On September 8, 2019, Danny Hultzen became the last of the first 29 picks to appear in an MLB game, when he made his debut for the Chicago Cubs.

	All-Star/All-MLB Team
*	Player did not sign

=== First round ===
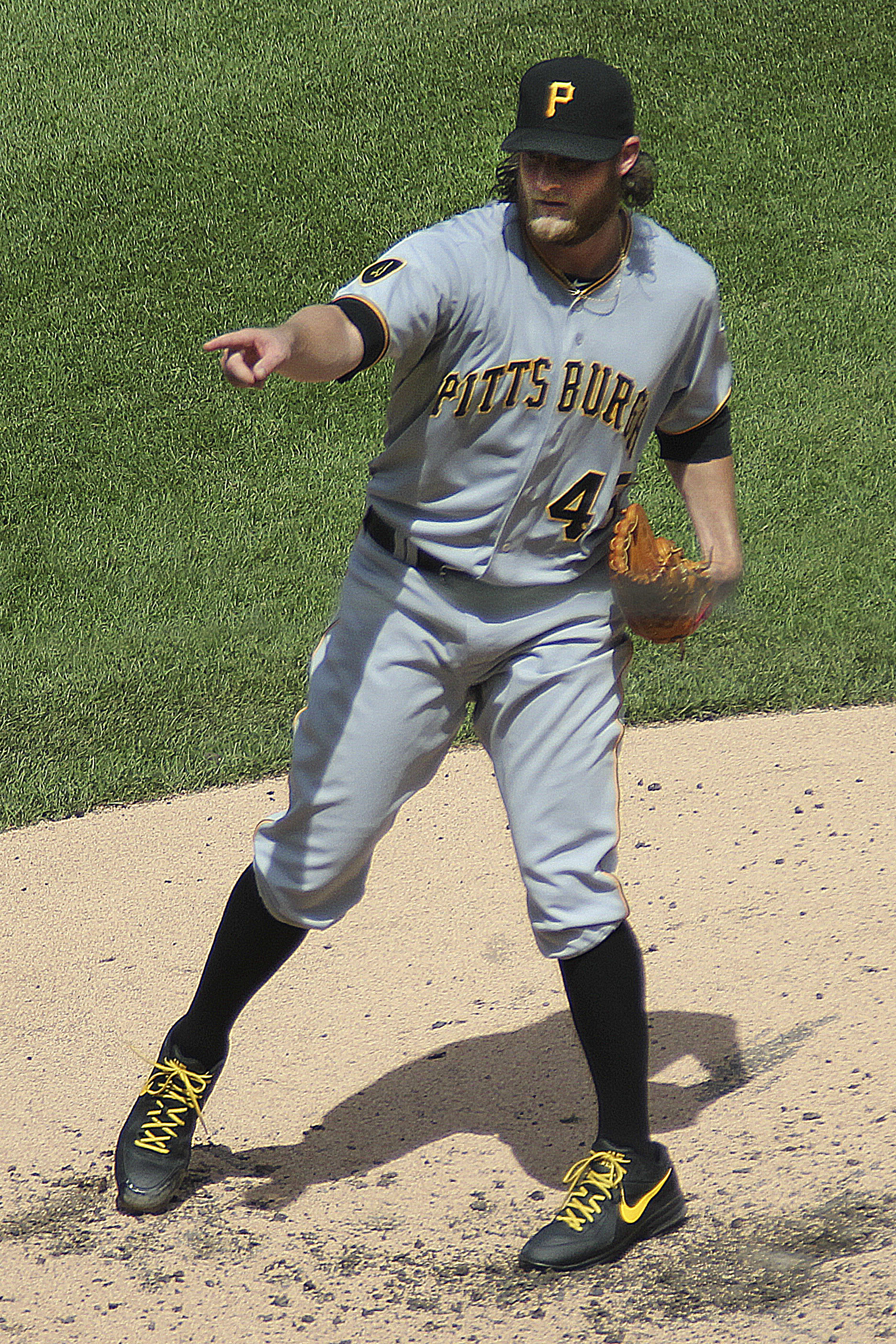
The Pittsburgh Pirates selected Gerrit Cole first overall. As of 2023, Cole is a 6× All-Star and an American League Cy Young Award winner.

Pick	Player	Team	Position	School
1	Gerrit Cole	Pittsburgh Pirates	Pitcher	UCLA
2	Danny Hultzen	Seattle Mariners	Pitcher	Virginia
3	Trevor Bauer	Arizona Diamondbacks	Pitcher	UCLA
4	Dylan Bundy	Baltimore Orioles	Pitcher	Owasso High School (OK)
5	Bubba Starling	Kansas City Royals	Outfielder	Gardner Edgerton High School (KS)
6	Anthony Rendon	Washington Nationals	Third baseman	Rice
7	Archie Bradley	Arizona Diamondbacks (Note: Compensation for unsigned 2010 pick Barret Loux)	Pitcher	Broken Arrow High School (OK)
8	Francisco Lindor	Cleveland Indians	Shortstop	Montverde Academy (FL)
9	Javier Báez	Chicago Cubs	Shortstop	Arlington Country Day School (FL)
10	Cory Spangenberg	San Diego Padres (Note: Compensation for unsigned 2010 pick Karsten Whitson)	Second baseman	Indian River State College (FL)
11	George Springer	Houston Astros	Outfielder	Connecticut
12	Taylor Jungmann	Milwaukee Brewers	Pitcher	Texas
13	Brandon Nimmo	New York Mets	Outfielder	Cheyenne East High School (WY)
14	José Fernández	Florida Marlins	Pitcher	Braulio Alonso High School (FL)
15	Jed Bradley	Milwaukee Brewers (Note: Compensation for unsigned 2010 pick Dylan Covey)	Pitcher	Georgia Tech
16	Chris Reed	Los Angeles Dodgers	Pitcher	Stanford
17	C. J. Cron	Los Angeles Angels of Anaheim	First baseman	Utah
18	Sonny Gray	Oakland Athletics	Pitcher	Vanderbilt
19	Matt Barnes	Boston Red Sox (Note: Pick from the Detroit Tigers for loss of Type A free agent Víctor Martínez)	Pitcher	Connecticut
20	Tyler Anderson	Colorado Rockies	Pitcher	Oregon
21	Tyler Beede*	Toronto Blue Jays	Pitcher	Lawrence Academy (MA)
22	Kolten Wong	St. Louis Cardinals	Second baseman	Hawaii
23	Alex Meyer	Washington Nationals (Note: Pick from the Chicago White Sox for loss of Type A free agent Adam Dunn)	Pitcher	Kentucky
24	Taylor Guerrieri	Tampa Bay Rays (Note: Pick from the Boston Red Sox for loss of Type A free agent Carl Crawford)	Pitcher	Spring Valley High School (SC)
25	Joe Ross	San Diego Padres	Pitcher	Bishop O'Dowd High School (CA)
26	Blake Swihart	Boston Red Sox (Note: Pick from the Texas Rangers for loss of Type A free agent Adrián Beltré)	Catcher	V. Sue Cleveland High School (NM)
27	Robert Stephenson	Cincinnati Reds	Pitcher	Alhambra High School (CA)
28	Sean Gilmartin	Atlanta Braves	Pitcher	Florida State
29	Joe Panik	San Francisco Giants	Shortstop	St. John's
30	Levi Michael	Minnesota Twins	Shortstop	North Carolina
31	Mikie Mahtook	Tampa Bay Rays (Note: Pick from the New York Yankees for loss of Type A free agent Rafael Soriano)	Outfielder	LSU
32	Jake Hager	Tampa Bay Rays	Shortstop	Sierra Vista High School (NV)
33	Kevin Matthews	Texas Rangers (Note: Pick from the Philadelphia Phillies for loss of Type A free agent Cliff Lee)	Pitcher	Richmond Hill High School (GA)

=== Supplemental first round ===
Pick	Player	Team	Position	School
34	Brian Goodwin	Washington Nationals (Note: Compensation for loss of Type A free agent Adam Dunn)	Outfielder	Miami Dade College
35	Jacob Anderson	Toronto Blue Jays (Note: Compensation for loss of Type A free agent Scott Downs)	Outfielder	Chino High School (CA)
36	Henry Owens	Boston Red Sox (Note: Compensation for loss of Type A free agent Víctor Martínez)	Left-handed pitcher	Edison High School (CA)
37	Zach Cone	Texas Rangers (Note: Compensation for loss of Type A free agent Cliff Lee)	Outfielder	Georgia
38	Brandon Martin	Tampa Bay Rays (Note: Compensation for loss of Type A free agent Carl Crawford)	Shortstop	Santiago High School (CA)
39	Larry Greene	Philadelphia Phillies (Note: Compensation for loss of Type A free agent Jayson Werth)	Outfielder	Berrien High School (GA)
40	Jackie Bradley Jr.	Boston Red Sox (Note: Compensation for loss of Type A free agent Adrián Beltré)	Outfielder	South Carolina
41	Tyler Goeddel	Tampa Bay Rays (Note: Compensation for loss of Type A free agent Grant Balfour)	Third baseman	Saint Francis High School (CA)
42	Jeff Ames	Tampa Bay Rays (Note: Compensation for loss of Type A free agent Rafael Soriano)	Right-handed pitcher	Lower Columbia College
43	Andrew Chafin	Arizona Diamondbacks (Note: Compensation for loss of Type B free agent Adam LaRoche)	Left-handed pitcher	Kent State
44	Michael Fulmer	New York Mets (Note: Compensation for loss of Type B free agent Pedro Feliciano)	Right-handed pitcher	Deer Creek High School (OK)
45	Trevor Story	Colorado Rockies (Note: Compensation for loss of Type B free agent Octavio Dotel)	Shortstop	Irving High School (TX)
46	Joe Musgrove	Toronto Blue Jays (Note: Compensation for loss of Type B free agent John Buck)	Right-handed pitcher	Grossmont High School (CA)
47	Keenyn Walker	Chicago White Sox (Note: Compensation for loss of Type B free agent J. J. Putz)	Outfielder	Central Arizona College
48	Michael Kelly	San Diego Padres (Note: Compensation for loss of Type B free agent Jon Garland)	Right-handed pitcher	West Boca Raton Community High School (FL)
49	Kyle Crick	San Francisco Giants (Note: Compensation for loss of Type B free agent Juan Uribe)	Right-handed pitcher	Sherman High School (TX)
50	Travis Harrison	Minnesota Twins (Note: Compensation for loss of Type B free agent Jesse Crain)	Third baseman	Tustin High School (CA)
51	Dante Bichette, Jr.	New York Yankees (Note: Compensation for loss of Type B free agent Javier Vázquez)	Third baseman	Orangewood Christian School (FL)
52	Blake Snell	Tampa Bay Rays (Note: Compensation for loss of Type B free agent Brad Hawpe)	Left-handed pitcher	Shorewood High School (WA)
53	Dwight Smith, Jr.	Toronto Blue Jays (Note: Compensation for loss of Type B free agent Miguel Olivo)	Outfielder	McIntosh High School (GA)
54	Brett Austin*	San Diego Padres (Note: Compensation for loss of Type B free agent Yorvit Torrealba)	Catcher	Providence High School (NC)
55	Hudson Boyd	Minnesota Twins (Note: Compensation for loss of Type B free agent Orlando Hudson)	Right-handed pitcher	Bishop Verot High School (FL)
56	Kes Carter	Tampa Bay Rays (Note: Compensation for loss of Type B free agent Randy Choate)	Outfielder	Western Kentucky
57	Kevin Comer	Toronto Blue Jays (Note: Compensation for loss of Type B free agent Kevin Gregg)	Right-handed pitcher	Seneca High School (NJ)
58	Jace Peterson	San Diego Padres (Note: Compensation for loss of Type B free agent Kevin Correia)	Shortstop	McNeese State
59	Grayson Garvin	Tampa Bay Rays (Note: Compensation for loss of Type B free agent Brad Hawpe)	Left-handed pitcher	Vanderbilt
60	James Harris	Tampa Bay Rays (Note: Compensation for loss of Type B free agent Chad Qualls)	Outfielder	Oakland Technical High School (CA)

== Other notable selections ==
As of September 2, 2019

Round	Pick	Player	Team	Position	School
2	61	Josh Bell	Pittsburgh Pirates	Outfielder	Jesuit College Preparatory School of Dallas (TX)
2	62	Brad Miller	Seattle Mariners	Shortstop	Clemson
2	65	Cam Gallagher	Kansas City Royals	Catcher	Manheim Township High School (PA)
2	66	Roman Quinn	Philadelphia Phillies	Shortstop	Port St. Joe High School (FL)
2	68	Daniel Vogelbach	Chicago Cubs	First Baseman	Bishop Verot High School (FL)
2	69	Adrian Houser	Houston Astros	Right-handed pitcher	Locust Grove High School (OK)
2	70	Jorge López	Milwaukee Brewers	Right-handed pitcher	Caguas Military Academy (PR)
2	71	Cory Mazzoni	New York Mets	Right-handed pitcher	North Carolina State
2	72	Adam Conley	Florida Marlins	Left-handed pitcher	Washington State
2	74	Daniel Norris	Toronto Blue Jays	Left-handed pitcher	Science Hill High School (TN)
2	76	James McCann	Detroit Tigers	Catcher	Arkansas
2	79	Charlie Tilson	St. Louis Cardinals	Outfielder	New Trier High School (IL)
2	80	Erik Johnson	Chicago White Sox	Right-handed pitcher	California
2	81	Williams Jerez	Boston Red Sox	Outfielder	Grand Street Campus (NY)
2	82	Austin Hedges	San Diego Padres	Catcher	Juniper Serra Catholic High School (CA)
2	85	Nick Ahmed	Atlanta Braves	Shortstop	Connecticut
2	86	Andrew Susac	San Francisco Giants	Catcher	Oregon State
3	91	Alex Dickerson	Pittsburgh Pirates	First Baseman	Indiana
3	92	Kevin Cron*	Seattle Mariners	First Baseman	Mountain Pointe High School (AZ)
3	94	Mike Wright	Baltimore Orioles	Right-handed pitcher	East Carolina
3	96	Matt Purke	Washington Nationals	Left-handed pitcher	Texas Christian
3	100	Drew Gagnon	Milwaukee Brewers	Right-handed pitcher	Long Beach State
3	101	Logan Verrett	New York Mets	Right-handed pitcher	Baylor
3	104	Nick Maronde	Los Angeles Angels of Anaheim	Left-handed pitcher	Florida
3	107	Peter O'Brien*	Colorado Rockies	Catcher	Bethune-Cookman
3	112	Matt Andriese	San Diego Padres	Right-handed pitcher	UC Riverside
3	114	Tony Cingrani	Cincinnati Reds	Left-handed pitcher	Rice
3	115	Kyle Kubitza	Atlanta Braves	Third Baseman	Texas State
3	120	Adam Morgan	Philadelphia Phillies	Left-handed pitcher	Alabama
3	121	Carter Capps	Seattle Mariners	Right-handed pitcher	Mount Olive College
4	122	Colten Brewer	Pittsburgh Pirates	Right-handed pitcher	Canton High School (TX)
4	123	John Hicks	Seattle Mariners	Catcher	Virginia
4	124	Evan Marshall	Arizona Diamondbacks	Right-handed pitcher	Kansas State
4	129	Tony Zych	Chicago Cubs	Right-handed pitcher	Louisville
4	131	Nick Ramirez	Milwaukee Brewers	First Baseman	Cal State Fullerton
4	132	Tyler Pill	New York Mets	Right-handed pitcher	Cal State Fullerton
4	135	Mike Clevinger	Los Angeles Angels of Anaheim	Right-handed pitcher	Seminole State College (FL)
4	142	Noé Ramirez	Boston Red Sox	Right-handed pitcher	Cal State Fullerton
4	146	J. R. Graham	Atlanta Braves	Right-handed pitcher	Santa Clara
4	151	Cody Asche	Philadelphia Phillies	Third Baseman	Nebraska
5	152	Tyler Glasnow	Pittsburgh Pirates	Right-handed pitcher	William S. Hart High School (CA)
5	154	Michael Pérez	Arizona Diamondbacks	Catcher	Colegio Vocacional Para Adultos (PR)
5	157	Matt Skole	Washington Nationals	Third Baseman	Georgia Tech
5	159	Tayler Scott	Chicago Cubs	Right-handed pitcher	Notre Dame Preparatory High School (AZ)
5	160	Nick Tropeano	Houston Astros	Right-handed pitcher	Stony Brook
5	161	Michael Reed	Milwaukee Brewers	Outfielder	Leander High School (TX)
5	162	Jack Leathersich	New York Mets	Left-handed pitcher	Massachusetts-Lowell
5	164	Scott McGough	Los Angeles Dodgers	Right-handed pitcher	Oregon
5	166	Beau Taylor	Oakland Athletics	Catcher	Central Florida
5	168	Taylor Featherston	Colorado Rockies	Shortstop	Texas Christian
5	170	Sam Gaviglio	St. Louis Cardinals	Right-handed pitcher	Oregon State
5	171	Scott Snodgress	Chicago White Sox	Left-handed pitcher	Stanford
5	172	Mookie Betts	Boston Red Sox	Shortstop	John Overton High School (TN)
5	174	Brandon Woodruff*	Texas Rangers	Right-handed pitcher	Wheeler High School (MS)
5	179	Greg Bird	New York Yankees	Catcher	Grandview High School (CO)
5	180	J. D. Davis*	Tampa Bay Rays	Third Baseman	Elk Grove High School (CA)
5	181	Mitch Walding	Philadelphia Phillies	Shortstop	St. Mary's High School (CA)
6	185	Nicky Delmonico	Baltimore Orioles	Third Baseman	Farragut High School (TN)
6	187	Taylor Hill	Washington Nationals	Right-handed pitcher	Vanderbilt
6	194	Scott Barlow	Los Angeles Dodgers	Right-handed pitcher	Golden Valley High School (CA)
6	197	Tyler Collins	Detroit Tigers	Outfielder	Howard College
6	199	Anthony DeSclafani	Toronto Blue Jays	Right-handed pitcher	Florida
6	201	Marcus Semien	Chicago White Sox	Shortstop	California
6	204	Derek Fisher*	Texas Rangers	Outfielder	Cedar Crest High School (PA)
6	207	Josh Osich	San Francisco Giants	Left-handed pitcher	Oregon State
6	208	Dereck Rodríguez	Minnesota Twins	Outfielder	Monsignor Edward Pace High School (FL)
6	209	Jake Cave	New York Yankees	Outfielder	Kecoughtan High School (VA)
7	218	Eric Haase	Cleveland Indians	Catcher	Divine Child High School (MI)
7	221	David Goforth	Milwaukee Brewers	Right-handed pitcher	Ole Miss
7	226	Blake Treinen	Oakland Athletics	Right-handed pitcher	South Dakota State
7	227	Brian Flynn	Detroit Tigers	Left-handed pitcher	Wichita State
7	230	Nick Martini	St. Louis Cardinals	Outfielder	Kansas State
7	231	Kevan Smith	Chicago White Sox	Catcher	Pittsburgh
7	233	Matt Wisler	San Diego Padres	Right-handed pitcher	Bryan High School (OH)
7	236	Cody Martin	Atlanta Braves	Right-handed pitcher	Gonzaga
7	237	Ray Black	San Francisco Giants	Right-handed pitcher	Pittsburgh
7	240	Ryan Carpenter	Tampa Bay Rays	Left-handed pitcher	Gonzaga
7	241	Ken Giles	Philadelphia Phillies	Right-handed pitcher	Yavapai College
8	243	Carson Smith	Seattle Mariners	Right-handed pitcher	Texas State
8	248	Stephen Tarpley*	Cleveland Indians	Left-handed pitcher	Gilbert High School (AZ)
8	252	Danny Muno	New York Mets	Shortstop	Fresno State
8	263	Kevin Quackenbush	San Diego Padres	Right-handed pitcher	South Florida
8	264	Kyle Hendricks	Texas Rangers	Right-handed pitcher	Dartmouth
8	266	Tommy La Stella	Atlanta Braves	Second Baseman	Coastal Carolina
8	268	Jason Wheeler	Minnesota Twins	Left-handed pitcher	Loyola Marymount
9	272	Clay Holmes	Pittsburgh Pirates	Right-handed pitcher	Slocomb High School (AL)
9	276	Aaron Brooks	Kansas City Royals	Right-handed pitcher	Cal State San Bernardino
9	283	Austin Barnes	Florida Marlins	Catcher	Arizona State
9	286	Jace Fry*	Oakland Athletics	Left-handed pitcher	Southridge High School (OR)
9	288	Ross Stripling*	Colorado Rockies	Right-handed pitcher	Texas A&M
9	289	Andrew Suárez*	Toronto Blue Jays	Left-handed pitcher	Christopher Columbus High School (FL)
9	292	Travis Shaw	Boston Red Sox	Third Baseman	Kent State
9	293	Justin Hancock	San Diego Padres	Right-handed pitcher	Lincoln Trail College
9	297	Derek Law	San Francisco Giants	Right-handed pitcher	Miami Dade College
10	305	Tyler Wilson	Baltimore Orioles	Right-handed pitcher	Virginia
10	317	Curt Casali	Detroit Tigers	Catcher	Vanderbilt
10	329	Jon Gray*	New York Yankees	Right-handed pitcher	Eastern Oklahoma State College
10	330	Jake Faria*	Tampa Bay Rays	Right-handed pitcher	Gahr High School (CA)
11	343	Jake Esch	Florida Marlins	Second Baseman	Georgia Tech
11	349	Andy Burns	Toronto Blue Jays	Shortstop	Arizona
11	350	Seth Maness	St. Louis Cardinals	Right-handed pitcher	East Carolina
11	354	Connor Sadzeck	Texas Rangers	Right-handed pitcher	Howard College
12	365	Jason Coats*	Baltimore Orioles	Outfielder	Texas Christian
12	369	Jacob Lindgren*	Chicago Cubs	Left-handed pitcher	Saint Stanislaus College
12	374	O'Koyea Dickson	Los Angeles Dodgers	First Baseman	Sonoma State University
12	375	Joey Krehbiel	Los Angeles Angels of Anaheim	Third Baseman	Seminole High School (FL)
12	383	Colin Rea	San Diego Padres	Right-handed pitcher	Indiana State
12	387	Kelby Tomlinson	San Francisco Giants	Shortstop	Texas Tech
12	391	Yacksel Ríos	Philadelphia Phillies	Right-handed pitcher	Doctora Conchita Cuevas High School (PR)
13	401	Mallex Smith*	Milwaukee Brewers	Outfielder	James S. Rickards High School (FL)
13	402	Robert Gsellman	New York Mets	Right-handed pitcher	Westchester High School (CA)
13	421	Colton Murray	Philadelphia Phillies	Right-handed pitcher	Kansas
14	428	Cody Anderson	Cleveland Indians	Right-handed pitcher	Feather River College
14	429	Dillon Maples	Chicago Cubs	Right-handed pitcher	Pinecrest High School (NC)
14	431	Jacob Barnes	Milwaukee Brewers	Right-handed pitcher	Florida Gulf Coast
14	443	Burch Smith	San Diego Padres	Right-handed pitcher	Oklahoma
14	444	Andrew Faulkner	Texas Rangers	Left-handed pitcher	South Aiken High School (SC)
14	448	Adam McCreery*	Minnesota Twins	Left-handed pitcher	Bonita High School (CA)
14	449	Rookie Davis	New York Yankees	Right-handed pitcher	Dixon High School (NC)
15	462	Phillip Evans	New York Mets	Shortstop	La Costa Canyon High School (CA)
15	474	Jerad Eickhoff	Texas Rangers	Right-handed pitcher	Olney Central College
15	476	John Cornely	Atlanta Braves	Right-handed pitcher	Wofford
16	482	Eric Skoglund*	Pittsburgh Pirates	Left-handed pitcher	Sarasota High School (FL)
16	488	Ryan Merritt	Cleveland Indians	Left-handed pitcher	McLennan Community College
16	489	Raffy Lopez	Chicago Cubs	Catcher	Florida State
16	491	Carlos Rodón*	Milwaukee Brewers	Left-handed pitcher	Holly Springs High School (NC)
16	493	Adrian Sampson*	Florida Marlins	Right-handed pitcher	Bellevue College
16	498	Preston Tucker*	Colorado Rockies	Outfielder	Florida
16	501	Chris Bassitt	Chicago White Sox	Right-handed pitcher	Akron
16	502	Daniel Gossett*	Boston Red Sox	Right-handed pitcher	James F. Byrnes High School (SC)
16	509	Branden Pinder	New York Yankees	Right-handed pitcher	Santa Ana College
17	519	John Andreoli	Chicago Cubs	Outfielder	Connecticut
17	527	Chad Smith	Detroit Tigers	Right-handed Pitcher	Southern California
17	533	Matt Stites	San Diego Padres	Right-handed pitcher	Missouri
17	534	Ryan Rua	Texas Rangers	Shortstop	Lake Erie College
17	536	Gus Schlosser	Atlanta Braves	Right-handed pitcher	Florida Southern
17	540	Taylor Motter	Tampa Bay Rays	Shortstop	Coastal Carolina
17	541	Jesen Therrien	Philadelphia Phillies	Right-handed pitcher	Collège Ahuntsic (Canada)
18	548	Shawn Armstrong	Cleveland Indians	Right-handed pitcher	East Carolina
18	552	Travis Taijeron	New York Mets	Outfielder	Cal Poly Pomona
18	559	Jon Berti	Toronto Blue Jays	Shortstop	Bowling Green
18	564	Nick Martinez	Texas Rangers	Right-handed pitcher	Fordham
19	578	Shawn Morimando	Cleveland Indians	Left-handed pitcher	Ocean Lakes High School (VA)
19	589	Luke Weaver*	Toronto Blue Jays	Right-handed pitcher	DeLand High School (FL)
19	597	Cody Hall	San Francisco Giants	Right-handed pitcher	Southern
19	600	Matt Ramsey	Tampa Bay Rays	Right-handed pitcher	Tennessee
20	602	Trea Turner*	Pittsburgh Pirates	Shortstop	Park Vista Community High School (FL)
20	606	Terrance Gore	Kansas City Royals	Outfielder	Gulf Coast State College
20	608	Dillon Peters*	Pittsburgh Pirates	Left-handed pitcher	Cathedral High School (IN)
20	610	Matt Duffy	Houston Astros	Third Baseman	Tennessee
20	618	Daniel Winkler	Colorado Rockies	Right-handed pitcher	Central Florida
20	620	Aramis Garcia*	St. Louis Cardinals	Catcher	Pembroke Pines Charter High School (FL)
20	628	Brian Anderson*	Minnesota Twins	Shortstop	Deer Creek High School (OK)
21	639	Andrew McKirahan	Chicago Cubs	Left-handed pitcher	Texas
21	642	John Gant	New York Mets	Right-handed pitcher	Wiregrass Ranch High School (FL)
21	657	Andrew Triggs*	San Francisco Giants	Right-handed pitcher	Southern California
22	679	Aaron Nola*	Toronto Blue Jays	Right-handed pitcher	Catholic High School (LA)
22	685	Amir Garrett	Cincinnati Reds	Left-handed pitcher	Findlay Prep (NV)
22	689	Nick Goody*	New York Yankees	Right-handed pitcher	State College of Florida
23	694	Ryan Court	Arizona Diamondbacks	Third baseman	Illinois State
23	698	Cody Allen	Cleveland Indians	Right-handed pitcher	High Point
23	699	Bradley Zimmer*	Chicago Cubs	Outfielder	La Jolla High School (CA)
23	711	Mike Marjama	Chicago White Sox	Catcher	Long Beach State
23	715	Sal Romano	Cincinnati Reds	Right-handed pitcher	Southington High School (CT)
24	726	Spencer Patton	Kansas City Royals	Right-handed pitcher	Southern Illinois-Edwardsville
24	739	David Rollins	Toronto Blue Jays	Left-handed pitcher	San Jacinto College
24	743	Erick Fedde*	San Diego Padres	Right-handed pitcher	Las Vegas High School (NV)
24	748	Nick Burdi*	Minnesota Twins	Right-handed pitcher	Downers Grove South High School (IL)
24	749	Matt Tracy	New York Yankees	Left-handed pitcher	Ole Miss
25	758	Kevin Kramer*	Cleveland Indians	Third Baseman	Turlock High School (CA)
25	762	A. J. Reed*	New York Mets	Left-handed pitcher	Terre Haute South Vigo High School (IN)
25	771	Chris Devenski	Chicago White Sox	Right-handed pitcher	Cal State Fullerton
26	785	Zach Davies	Baltimore Orioles	Right-handed pitcher	Mesquite High School (AZ)
26	791	Josh Smith*	Milwaukee Brewers	Left-handed pitcher	Wichita State
26	800	Brett Graves*	St. Louis Cardinals	Right-handed pitcher	Francis Howell High School (MO)
26	807	Joe Biagini	San Francisco Giants	Right-handed pitcher	UC Davis
27	838	Chris Mazza	Minnesota Twins	Right-handed pitcher	Menlo College
28	852	Jharel Cotton*	New York Mets	Right-handed pitcher	Miami Dade College
28	857	Guido Knudson	Detroit Tigers	Right-handed pitcher	UC San Diego
28	860	Ryan Sherriff	St. Louis Cardinals	Left-handed pitcher	Glendale Community College (AZ)
29	873	Keone Kela*	Seattle Mariners	Right-handed pitcher	Chief Sealth International High School (WA)
29	876	Jakob Junis	Kansas City Royals	Right-handed pitcher	Rock Falls High School (IL)
29	888	Matt Dermody*	Colorado Rockies	Left-handed pitcher	Iowa
29	889	Taylor Cole	Toronto Blue Jays	Right-handed pitcher	Brigham Young
30	918	John Curtiss*	Colorado Rockies	Right-handed pitcher	Carroll Senior High School (TX)
30	924	Phil Klein	Texas Rangers	Right-handed pitcher	Youngstown State
30	929	John Brebbia	New York Yankees	Right-handed pitcher	Elon
31	938	Michael Roth*	Cleveland Indians	Left-handed pitcher	South Carolina
31	945	Jett Bandy	Los Angeles Angels of Anaheim	Catcher	Arizona
31	949	Austin Nola*	Toronto Blue Jays	Shortstop	LSU
31	959	Aaron Bummer*	New York Yankees	Left-handed pitcher	Sunrise Mountain High School (AZ)
32	967	Billy Burns	Washington Nationals	Outfielder	Mercer
32	979	Kevin Pillar	Toronto Blue Jays	Outfielder	Cal State Dominguez Hills
33	994	Anthony Banda*	Arizona Diamondbacks	Left-handed pitcher	Sinton High School (TX)
33	1001	Steven Okert*	Milwaukee Brewers	Left-handed pitcher	Grayson College
33	1015	Steve Selsky	Cincinnati Reds	Outfielder	Arizona
33	1021	Brock Stassi	Philadelphia Phillies	Left-handed pitcher	Nevada-Reno
34	1032	Seth Lugo	New York Mets	Right-handed pitcher	Centenary College (LA)
35	1062	Chasen Bradford	New York Mets	Left-handed pitcher	Central Florida
35	1074	Cy Sneed*	Texas Rangers	Right-handed pitcher	Twin Falls High School (ID)
35	1081	Kyle Freeland*	Philadelphia Phillies	Left-handed pitcher	Thomas Jefferson High School (CO)
37	1136	Ryne Harper	Atlanta Braves	Left-handed pitcher	Austin Peay
38	1156	Alex Blandino*	Oakland Athletics	Shortstop	Saint Francis High School (CA)
39	1199	Taylor Guilbeau*	New York Yankees	Left-handed pitcher	Zachary High School (LA)
40	1225	Sam Travis*	Cincinnati Reds	Third Baseman	Providence Catholic High School (IL)
40	1228	Kyle Barraclough*	Minnesota Twins	Left-handed pitcher	St. Mary's (CA)
41	1251	Chandler Shepherd*	Chicago White Sox	Right-handed pitcher	Lawrence County High School (KY)
42	1274	Max Povse*	Los Angeles Dodgers	Right-handed pitcher	Green Hope High School (NC)
42	1285	Jacob Stallings*	Cincinnati Reds	Catcher	North Carolina
44	1326	Andrew Vasquez*	Kansas City Royals	Left-handed pitcher	Los Osos High School (CA)
44	1334	Austin Slater*	Los Angeles Dodgers	Third Baseman	Bolles School (FL)
44	1336	Christopher Bostick	Oakland Athletics	Shortstop	Aquinas Institute (NY)
45	1374	Brandon Finnegan*	Texas Rangers	Left-handed pitcher	Southwest High School (TX)
46	1402	Mac Williamson*	Boston Red Sox	Outfielder	Wake Forest
46	1406	John Means*	Atlanta Braves	Left-handed pitcher	Gardner Edgerton High School (KS)
48	1446	Matt Beaty*	Kansas City Royals	Catcher	Dresden High School (TN)
48	1449	Sam Howard*	Chicago Cubs	Left-handed pitcher	Cartersville High School (GA)
48	1464	Carl Edwards Jr.	Texas Rangers	Right-handed pitcher	Mid-Carolina High School (SC)
48	1467	Jake Smith	San Francisco Giants	Left-handed pitcher	Campbell
50	1514	Chris Ellis*	Los Angeles Dodgers	Right-handed pitcher	Spain Park High School (AL)

== See also ==
- List of first overall Major League Baseball draft picks
