= Conner Menez =

American baseball player (born 1995)

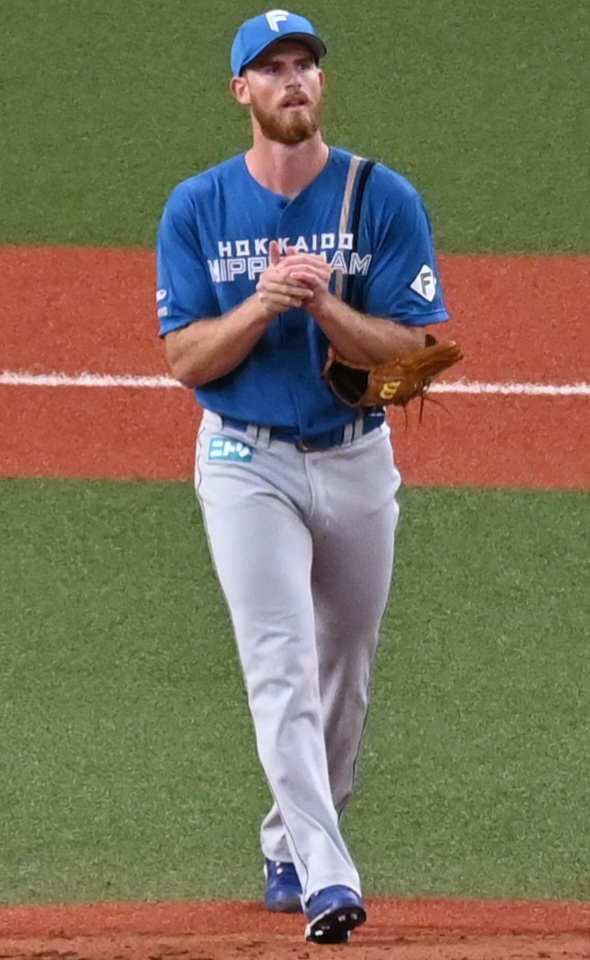
- Menez with the Hokkaido Nippon-Ham Fighters

Free agent
- Pitcher
- Born: May 29, 1995 (age 31); Hollister, California, U.S.
- Bats: Left Throws: Left

Professional debut
- MLB: July 21, 2019, for the San Francisco Giants
- NPB: July 19, 2022, for the Hokkaido Nippon-Ham Fighters

MLB statistics (through 2022 season)
- Win–loss record: 2–1
- Earned run average: 3.95
- Strikeouts: 46

NPB statistics (through 2023 season)
- Win–loss record: 1-2
- Earned run average: 2.13
- Strikeouts: 47
- Stats at Baseball Reference

Teams
- San Francisco Giants (2019–2021); Chicago Cubs (2022); Hokkaido Nippon-Ham Fighters (2022–2023)

Conner Scott Menez (born May 29, 1995) is an American professional baseball pitcher who is a free agent. He has previously played in Major League Baseball (MLB) for the San Francisco Giants and Chicago Cubs, and in Nippon Professional Baseball (NPB) for the Hokkaido Nippon-Ham Fighters. He played college baseball at The Master's University and was drafted by the Giants in the 14th round of the 2016 Major League Baseball draft.

== Amateur career ==
Menez grew up and played youth baseball in Shasta County, California before moving to Hollister to attend San Benito High School. He then played college baseball at The Master's University from 2014 to 2016, where he had a 20–5 win–loss record and a 2.26 career earned run average (ERA), the lowest in school history.

== Professional career ==
=== San Francisco Giants ===
The San Francisco Giants selected Menez in the 14th round (425th overall) of the 2016 Major League Baseball draft. He signed for a $75,000 signing bonus.

Menez spent his first professional season with the Arizona League Giants, Salem-Keizer Volcanoes and San Jose Giants, pitching to a combined 4–1 record and 4.22 ERA in 53.1 innings pitched between the three teams. He pitched in 2017 with San Jose, going 7–7 with a 4.41 ERA in 23 games (22 starts), and in 2018 with San Jose, the Richmond Flying Squirrels and the Sacramento River Cats, compiling a combined 9–10 record with a 4.46 ERA in 28 total starts with 171 strikeouts in 135 1/3 innings (averaging 11.4 strikeouts per nine innings).

Menez started 2019 with Richmond and was promoted to Sacramento during the season. Between the two teams, in 2019 he was 6–4 with a 3.79 ERA in 23 games (22 starts) in which he pitched 121 innings and struck out 154 batters (averaging 11.5 strikeouts per nine innings).

On July 21, 2019, the Giants selected Menez's contract and promoted him to the major leagues. In his major league debut that day, he pitched five innings while allowing 2 runs and recording six strikeouts. In 2019 for the Giants he was 0–1 with a 5.29 ERA in eight games (three starts) covering 17 innings in which he struck out 22 batters.

Menez made seven appearances for San Francisco during the truncated 2020 campaign, compiling a 1-0 record and 2.38 ERA with eight strikeouts across 11 1/3 innings pitched.

Menez pitched in eight games for the Giants in 2021, logging a 1-0 record and 3.86 ERA with 15 strikeouts over 14 innings of work. On August 4, 2021, Menez was designated for assignment by the Giants. He cleared waivers and was sent outright to Triple-A Sacramento on August 7.

=== Chicago Cubs ===
On December 8, 2021, the Chicago Cubs selected Menez in the minor league phase of the Rule 5 draft. He was assigned to the Triple-A Iowa Cubs to begin the 2022 season.

On May 9, 2022, Menez was selected to the 40-man and active rosters. After pitching a scoreless inning in a loss to the Arizona Diamondbacks, he was optioned back to Triple-A Iowa. On June 4, Menez was designated for assignment by Chicago after Caleb Kilian had his contract selected. He cleared waivers and was sent outright to Triple-A Iowa on June 6.

=== Hokkaido Nippon-Ham Fighters ===
On June 24, 2022, Menez announced via Instagram that he would be signing with the Hokkaido Nippon-Ham Fighters of Nippon Professional Baseball (NPB). Fighters manager Tsuyoshi Shinjo said regarding Menez's acquisition that he may come to Japan "in a week". In 18 appearances for the Fighters, Menez recorded a 1.08 ERA with 28 strikeouts in 25.0 innings pitched.

In 2023, Menez pitched in 12 games for the Fighters, logging a 3.16 ERA with 19 strikeouts in 25 2/3 innings of work. On July 1, 2023, Menez was released by Hokkaido.

On October 9, 2023, Menez signed to played winter baseball with the Águilas Cibaeñas of the Dominican Professional Baseball League, where he pitched in three games.

=== Diablos Rojos del México ===
On March 23, 2024, Menez signed with the Diablos Rojos del México of the Mexican League. In 31 games (7 starts), he compiled a 4–2 record and 4.25 ERA with 45 strikeouts across 53 innings of work. With the team, Menez won the Serie del Rey.

On October 17, 2024, Menez signed to play winter baseball with the Tomateros de Culiacán of the Mexican Pacific League. He made 14 appearances for the Diablos in 2025, registering a 2-1 record and 2.35 ERA with 17 strikeouts across 15 1/3 innings pitched. On July 11, 2025, Menez was released by the team.

=== Saraperos de Saltillo ===
On July 28, 2025, Menez signed with the Saraperos de Saltillo of the Mexican League. He appeared in three games in relief, struggling to a 20.25 ERA with more walks (seven) than strikeouts (four) across 2 2/3 innings pitched. Menez was released by the Saraperos on January 6, 2026.

== Personal life ==
Menez's grandfather was Bill Plummer, a former major league catcher, coach, and manager.

== See also ==
- Rule 5 draft results
