= Tyler Beede =

American baseball player (born 1993)

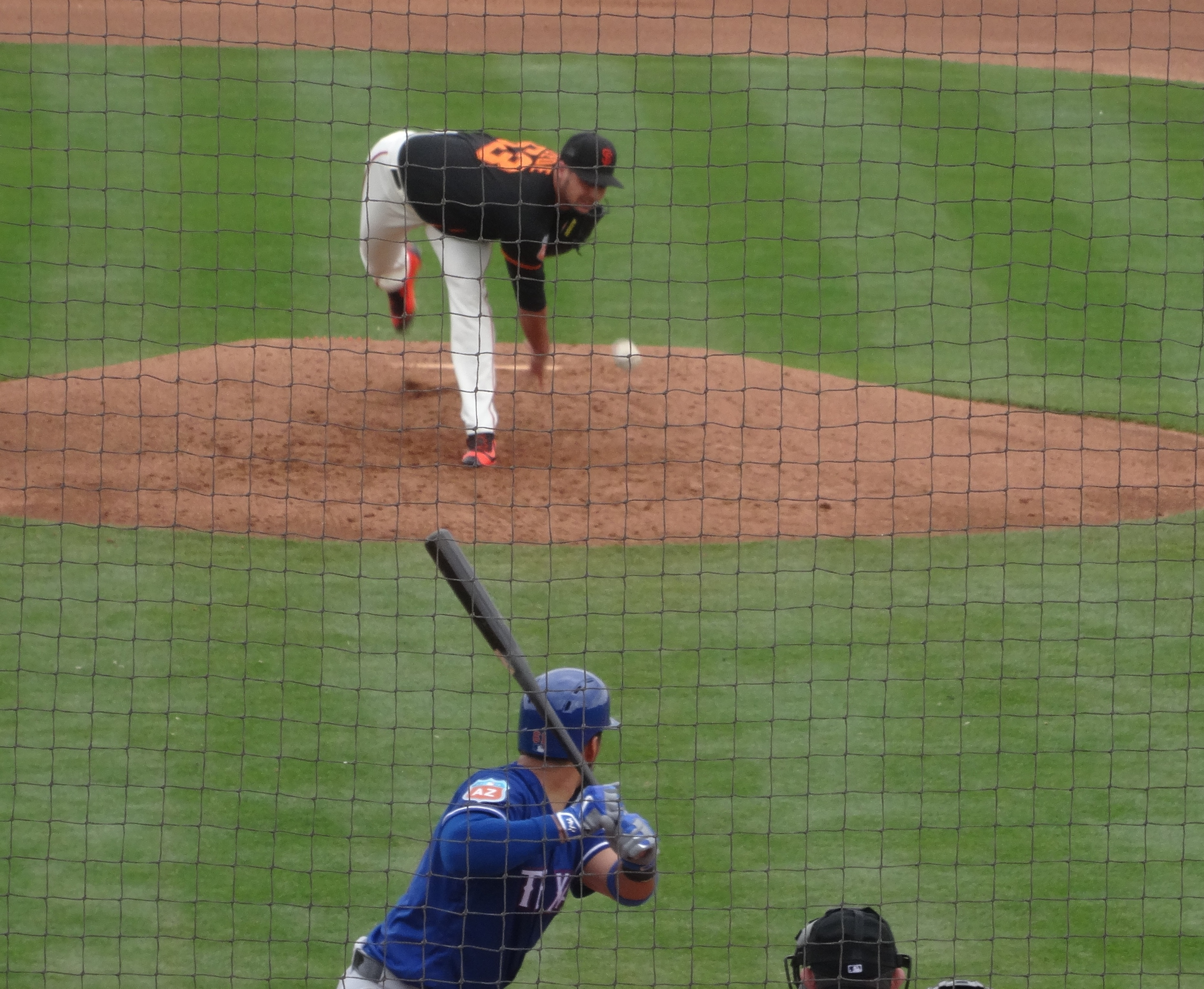
- Beede with the San Francisco Giants in 2016
- Pitcher
- Born: May 23, 1993 (age 33); Worcester, Massachusetts, U.S.
- Batted: Right Threw: Right

Professional debut
- MLB: April 10, 2018, for the San Francisco Giants
- NPB: March 31, 2023, for the Yomiuri Giants

Last appearance
- MLB: May 2, 2024, for the Cleveland Guardians
- NPB: September 23, 2023, for the Yomiuri Giants

MLB statistics
- Win–loss record: 8–16
- Earned run average: 5.55
- Strikeouts: 181

NPB statistics
- Win–loss record: 0–6
- Earned run average: 3.99
- Strikeouts: 36
- Stats at Baseball Reference

Teams
- San Francisco Giants (2018–2019, 2021–2022); Pittsburgh Pirates (2022); Yomiuri Giants (2023); Cleveland Guardians (2024)

Tyler Joseph Beede (/ˈbiːdiː/ BEE-dee; born May 23, 1993) is an American former professional baseball pitcher. He played in Major League Baseball (MLB) for the San Francisco Giants, Pittsburgh Pirates, and Cleveland Guardians, and in Nippon Professional Baseball (NPB) for the Yomiuri Giants.

The Toronto Blue Jays selected him in the first round, with the 21st overall selection, of the 2011 MLB draft, but he turned down a $2.5 million signing bonus to instead attend Vanderbilt University. He played college baseball for the Vanderbilt Commodores, and was drafted by the Giants as the 14th pick in the first round of the 2014 MLB draft. He made his MLB debut in 2018.

== Early life ==
Beede first attended hometown Auburn High School, in Massachusetts. In 2009, as a sophomore, he helped them win the Division 2 state title, as he was 7–1 with an 0.88 ERA, with 114 strikeouts in 56.1 innings.

Beede then transferred to Lawrence Academy at Groton in Groton, Massachusetts. In 2010 he went 14–1 with an 0.80 ERA and 189 strikeouts in 96.1 innings. The following spring he went 8–0 with an 0.69 ERA, and 102 strikeouts, 8 walks, and 13 hits in 51 innings. His fastball reached 92–94 mph.

The Toronto Blue Jays selected him in the first round, with the 21st overall selection, of the 2011 Major League Baseball draft. However, he decided not to sign, turning down a $2.5 million signing bonus, to instead attend Vanderbilt University to play college baseball for the Vanderbilt Commodores. He was the only first round pick that year not to sign.

== College career ==
As a freshman at Vanderbilt in 2012, Beede had a 1–5 win–loss record with a 4.52 earned run average (ERA) and 68 strikeouts in 71.2 innings. He was named to the All-Southeastern Conference freshman team.

Beede started his sophomore season in 2013 winning his first 14 starts. He finished the season 14–1 (leading the Southeastern Conference in wins, and a school record) with a 2.32 ERA, 103 strikeouts (3rd) in 101 innings, and 5.9 hits per 9 innings (8th). He was one of three finalists for the Golden Spikes Award and a finalist for the Dick Howser Trophy. After the season, he was selected by USA Baseball to play for the United States collegiate national team during the summer. As a junior in 2014 he was 8–8 (with his 8 wins 9th in the Conference) with a 4.04 ERA and 116 strikeouts (2nd) in 113.1 innings, and helped Vanderbilt win the College World Series.

== Professional career ==
=== San Francisco Giants ===
==== Minor leagues ====
The San Francisco Giants selected Beede in the first round, 14th overall, of the 2014 Major League Baseball draft, and he signed for a $2,613,200 signing bonus. He made his professional debut with the Arizona Giants of the Rookie-level Arizona League in 2014, and after giving up three runs in 8 2/3 innings along with striking out 11, he was promoted to the Salem-Keizer Volcanoes of the Low–A Northwest League, where he finished the season with a 2.70 ERA and 7 strikeouts in 6 2/3 innings.

He started 2015 with the San Jose Giants of the High–A California League, before being promoted to the Richmond Flying Squirrels of the Double–A Eastern League in June. In 22 total games started between both teams, he pitched to a 5–10 record and 3.97 ERA in 124.2 innings along with a 1.26 WHIP. He was a California League mid-season All Star, and Baseball America ranked him the # 2 prospect of the Giants.

Beede spent the 2016 season with Richmond, finishing with an 8–7 record and 2.81 ERA, the lowest in the Eastern League, and 135 strikeouts (2nd in the league) along with 14 wild pitches (tops in the league) in 147.1 innings. He was an Eastern League mid-season All Star, and an MiLB Organization All Star.

In 2017, he played for the Sacramento River Cats of the Triple–A Pacific Coast League, where he posted a 6–7 record with a 4.79 ERA in 109 innings in 19 games started. The Giants added Beede to their 40-man roster after the 2017 season.

==== Major leagues ====
The Giants promoted Beede to the major leagues on April 10, 2018 and he made his major league debut the same night at AT&T Park against the Arizona Diamondbacks. He started the game and pitched four innings, giving up two earned runs and three hits while striking out three and walking five while not receiving a decision in an eventual 5–4 win. He pitched 7.2 innings in two games for the season with the Giants.

In 2019 with Triple–A Sacramento he was 2–2 with a 2.34 ERA in seven starts in which he pitched 34.2 innings and struck out 49 batters (12.7 strikeouts per 9 innings). Called up, on June 17, 2019, Beede earned his first major league win in a 3–2 win over the Los Angeles Dodgers, pitching six innings and allowing just one run on three hits. In 2019 with the Giants he was 5–10 with a 5.08 ERA in 24 games (22 starts) in which he had 113 strikeouts (7th among NL rookies) in 117 innings.

In March 2020, Beede had Tommy John surgery. Beede missed the 2020 season as a result.

On February 26, 2021, Beede was placed on the 60-day injured list as he continued to recover from Tommy John surgery. On July 6, Beede was activated from the injured list.

In the 2021 regular season for the Giants, Beede pitched one inning in one game, giving up three earned runs. Pitching for Triple–A Sacramento, he was 0–6 with a 6.66 ERA, as in 16 starts he pitched 42.2 innings, striking out 50 batters.

Beede made six appearances for San Francisco in 2022, working to a 4.66 ERA with four strikeouts in 9.2 innings pitched. On May 5, 2022, Beede was designated for assignment by San Francisco.

=== Pittsburgh Pirates ===
On May 12, 2022, Beede was claimed off waivers by the Pittsburgh Pirates. In 25 appearances for Pittsburgh, he registered a 5.23 ERA with 35 strikeouts in 51 2/3 innings pitched. On September 15, Beede was designated for assignment following the promotion of Eric Stout. He cleared waivers and was sent outright to the Triple–A Indianapolis Indians on September 22. Beede elected free agency following the season on October 6.

=== Yomiuri Giants ===
On November 25, 2022, Beede signed with the Yomiuri Giants of Nippon Professional Baseball. On March 31, 2023, Beede made his NPB debut as the Opening Day starter against the Chunichi Dragons, with Tomoyuki Sugano sidelined with an injury and unable to start. With the start, he became the first non-Japanese pitcher in his first year to serve as the Opening Day starter for Yomiuri. In 30 games for Yomiuri, he went 0–6 with a 3.99 ERA and 36 strikeouts across 49 2/3 innings of work. On November 27, the Giants announced that Beede would not be returning to the team the following year.

=== Cleveland Guardians ===
On January 27, 2024, Beede signed a minor league contract with the Cleveland Guardians. On March 22, it was announced that Beede had made Cleveland's Opening Day roster. The Guardians selected Beede's contract on March 28. In 13 appearances for Cleveland, he struggled to an 8.36 ERA with 18 strikeouts across 14 innings pitched. On May 3, Beede was designated for assignment by the Guardians. After clearing waivers, Beede was outrighted to the Triple-A Columbus Clippers on May 7. Beede elected minor league free agency on October 21.

=== Minnesota Twins ===
On April 15, 2025, Beede signed a minor league contract with the Minnesota Twins. In seven appearances for the Triple-A St. Paul Saints, he struggled to an 8.00 ERA with seven strikeouts and one save across nine innings pitched. On June 1, Beede was released by the Twins.

=== Long Island Ducks ===
On June 13, 2025, Beede signed with the Long Island Ducks of the Atlantic League of Professional Baseball. In five starts for Long Island, Beede posted a 2-1 record and 5.48 ERA with 26 strikeouts across 21 1/3 innings pitched.

=== Diablos Rojos del México ===
On July 11, 2025, Beede signed with the Diablos Rojos del México of the Mexican League. In three starts for the Diablos, he struggled to a 1-2 record and 7.43 ERA with three strikeouts across 13 1/3 innings pitched. Beede was released by México on July 29.

=== Chicago Cubs ===
On December 26, 2025, Beede signed with the Toros de Tijuana of the Mexican League. However on January 12, 2026, Beede signed a minor league contract with the Chicago Cubs. On March 23, Beede was released by the Cubs prior to the start of the regular season. On April 7, he re-signed with the Cubs on a new minor league contract. Beede made 13 appearances for the Triple-A Iowa Cubs, posting a 2-2 record and 12.71 ERA with 22 strikeouts across 22 2/3 innings pitched. He was released by Chicago on June 26.

== Personal life ==
Beede's father, Walter, was drafted by the Chicago Cubs out of high school in the 13th round of the 1981 major league draft as a first baseman, and played a year in the minor leagues. He coached at Becker College in Worcester, Massachusetts, from 2001 to 2008.

Beede married actress Allie DeBerry in November 2017. Their son was born in September 2022.

== See also ==
- List of baseball players who underwent Tommy John surgery
