= Dereck Rodríguez =

American baseball pitcher (born 1992)

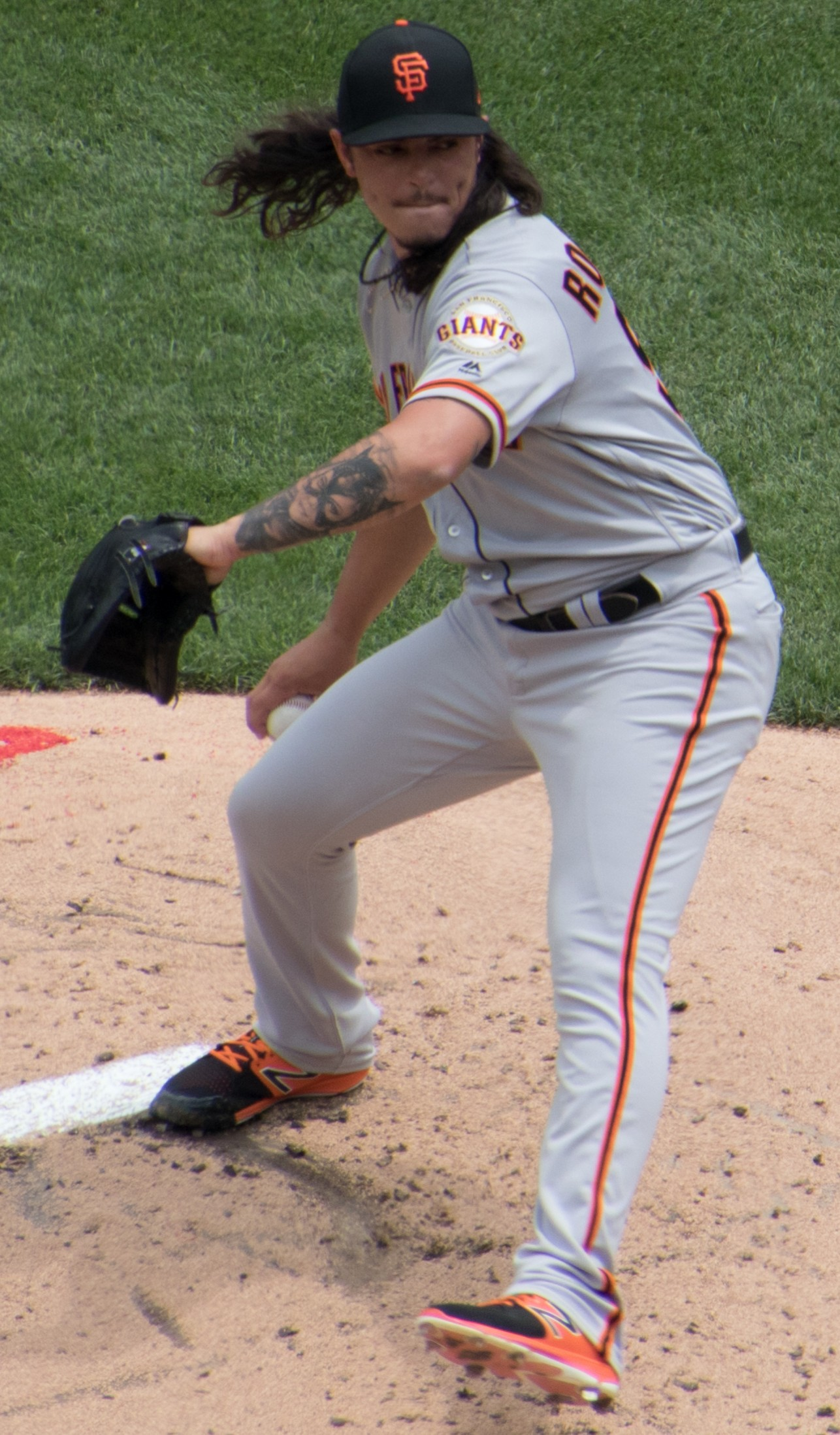
- Rodríguez with the San Francisco Giants

Dorados de Chihuahua – No. 57
- Pitcher
- Born: June 5, 1992 (age 34); Arlington, Texas, U.S.
- Bats: Right Throws: Right

MLB debut
- May 29, 2018, for the San Francisco Giants

MLB statistics (through 2023 season)
- Win–loss record: 12–16
- Earned run average: 4.49
- Strikeouts: 167
- Stats at Baseball Reference

Teams
- San Francisco Giants (2018–2020); Minnesota Twins (2022–2023); Atlanta Braves (2023)
Medals
Men's baseball
Representing Puerto Rico
World Baseball Classic
| Silver medal – second place | 2017 Los Angeles | National team |

Iván Dereck Rodríguez (born June 5, 1992), nicknamed D-Rod, is an American professional baseball pitcher for the Dorados de Chihuahua of the Mexican League. The Minnesota Twins selected Rodríguez in the sixth round of the 2011 MLB draft as an outfielder. He was converted to a pitcher in 2014 and made his MLB debut with the San Francisco Giants in 2018. He has also played in Major League Baseball (MLB) for the Twins and Atlanta Braves. He is the son of Hall of Famer Iván Rodríguez, and is affectionately known to fans as Son of Pudge. He plays for the Puerto Rico national baseball team.

== Early life ==
Rodríguez was born in Arlington, Texas, to Maribel Rivera and Baseball Hall of Famer Iván Rodríguez. His father spent 21 years in Major League Baseball (MLB), won 13 Gold Gloves, and was a 14-time All-Star. He has three siblings. He grew up in Texas, and at age 10 moved to Florida, where he later on attended Monsignor Edward Pace High School in Opa-locka, Florida, and transitioned from catcher and played center field and pitched for the baseball team.

== Professional career ==
=== Minnesota Twins (2011–2017) ===
==== Minor leagues ====
The Minnesota Twins drafted Rodríguez in the sixth round, with the 208th overall selection, of the 2011 MLB draft as an outfielder, and he signed for a $130,000 signing bonus. After he batted .216 with six home runs in 352 at bats at the Rookie-level in Minor League Baseball over his first three professional seasons, the Twins converted him into a pitcher in 2014. He was 2–2 with a 1.05 ERA in 17 relief appearances for the Elizabethton Twins. In 2015, Rodríguez had a 6–3 win–loss record and a 2.85 ERA with 61 strikeouts in 12 games started for Elizabethton, and was named the league's Pitcher of the Year. He also played in three games for the Cedar Rapids Kernels and Fort Myers Miracle. The next season, he pitched for Cedar Rapids, where he had a 4–11 win–loss record and a 5.08 ERA, and for Fort Myers where he pitched to a 1–2 record with a 2.56 ERA. During the 2016–17 offseason, he pitched for the Indios de Mayagüez of the Puerto Rican Professional Baseball League, and then pitched for the Criollos de Caguas in the 2017 Caribbean Series. He was named to the Puerto Rican national baseball team's roster for the 2017 World Baseball Classic. In 2017, he pitched for both Fort Myers and the Chattanooga Lookouts where he compiled a combined 10–6 record and 3.27 ERA in 26 games (24 starts) between both teams. Rodríguez elected free agency following the season on November 6, 2017.

=== San Francisco Giants (2018–2020) ===
On November 15, 2017, Rodríguez signed a minor league contract with the San Francisco Giants organization. He began the season with the Sacramento River Cats of the Triple–A Pacific Coast League. Rodríguez posted a 4–1 win–loss record and a 3.40 ERA.

==== Major leagues ====
The Giants promoted him to the major leagues on May 28. Rodríguez made his major league debut in relief of Jeff Samardzija on May 29, 2018, against the Colorado Rockies. During the game, he pitched 3 1/3 innings and hit an RBI double. Rodríguez had a successful rookie year with the Giants with a 6–4 record and 2.81 earned run average in 31 games. As a starter, he allowed 3 runs or less in 16 of his 19 starts and pitched 5 or more innings in 17 of his 19 starts.

Rodríguez struggled during the early portion of the 2019 season and was sent down to the Triple-A Sacramento River Cats. He was recalled and sent back down to Sacramento several times during the season and pitched in relief and made spot starts for the Giants. For the season, with Sacramento and San Jose he was 3–0 with a 3.67 ERA in seven starts in which he pitched 34.1 innings and struck out 37 batters. With the Giants, he was 6–11 with a 5.64 ERA and pitched in 28 games (16 starts) in which he pitched 99 innings.

In the 2020 season, Rodríguez only pitched in two games before being designated for assignment on August 26, 2020, to make space for Joey Rickard on the roster.

=== Detroit Tigers (2020) ===
On August 31, 2020, the Detroit Tigers claimed Rodríguez off waivers from the San Francisco Giants. On October 27, Rodríguez was outrighted off of the 40-man roster, without having made an appearance for Detroit. He became a free agent on November 2.

=== Colorado Rockies (2021) ===
On November 9, 2020, Rodríguez signed a minor league contract with the Colorado Rockies organization that included an invitation to spring training. Rodríguez spent the 2021 season with the Triple-A Albuquerque Isotopes, making 22 appearances, going 4–6 with a 6.72 ERA and 87 strikeouts. He became a free agent following the season on November 7, 2021.

=== Minnesota Twins (2022–2023) ===
On January 12, 2022, Rodríguez signed a minor league contract with the Minnesota Twins. The Twins promoted him to the major leagues on April 13. In his only appearance, Rodríguez allowed three runs on four hits and three walks while striking out two against the Los Angeles Dodgers. He was designated for assignment on April 15 after Kyle Garlick was added to the roster. He was sent outright to the Triple-A St. Paul Saints the next day.

On September 17, Rodríguez was selected back to the major league roster after Trevor Megill was placed on the COVID-19 injured list. He tossed 3 2/3 innings against the Cleveland Guardians, allowing two unearned runs on three hits with two strikeouts in the 6–7 loss. The next day, he was designated for assignment following the promotion of Ronny Henríquez. On September 20, Rodríguez cleared waivers and was sent outright to Triple–A St. Paul. He elected free agency on October 6.

On January 20, 2023, Rodríguez re-signed with the Twins organization on a minor league contract. He began the year with Triple-A St. Paul, recording a 4.66 ERA with 20 strikeouts in 19.1 innings pitched across 7 games (2 starts). On May 5, Rodríguez had his contract selected to the active roster. In his only appearances for Minnesota, Rodríguez pitched two-thirds of an inning and allowed one run on one hit and one walk with no strikeouts.

=== Atlanta Braves (2023) ===
On May 15, 2023, Rodríguez was claimed off waivers by the Atlanta Braves and optioned to the Triple-A Gwinnett Stripers. On May 27, Rodríguez was promoted to major leagues, and he made his Braves debut the following day, allowing no runs on one hit and one walk in two innings against the Philadelphia Phillies. The next day, Rodríguez was sent back down to Triple-A Gwinnett. On June 26, Rodríguez was promoted back to the Braves' major league roster in replacement of AJ Smith-Shawver, who was optioned down to Gwinnett. On July 24, he was designated for assignment by Atlanta following the acquisition of Taylor Hearn. He cleared waivers and was sent outright to Triple–A on July 26. On September 17, Rodríguez had his contract selected back to the major league roster. After allowing a staggering eight runs in two innings of relief, Rodríguez was designated for assignment by Atlanta the following day. He cleared waivers and was again sent outright to Gwinnett on September 20. He elected free agency on October 13.

=== Charros de Jalisco ===
On February 23, 2024, Rodríguez signed with the Charros de Jalisco of the Mexican League. In 16 starts for Jalisco, he logged a 6–2 record and 4.50 ERA with 51 strikeouts across 82 innings pitched.

Rodríguez made 13 starts for Jalisco in 2025, but struggled to a 2-3 record and 8.23 ERA with 37 strikeouts across 62 1/3 innings pitched.

=== El Águila de Veracruz ===
On July 10, 2025, Rodríguez was traded to El Águila de Veracruz of the Mexican League. In seven relief appearances, he posted a 1–0 record with a 5.40 ERA and seven strikeouts across 13 1/3 innings pitched. Rodríguez became a free agent following the season.

=== Dorados de Chihuahua ===
On June 2, 2026, Rodríguez signed with the Dorados de Chihuahua of the Mexican League.

== Personal life ==
Rodríguez likes to cook and mostly cooks the Puerto Rican food he grew up with. He also likes video games, including Fortnite. Rodríguez is married to Ashley Negrón, whom he met in 2015 at a basketball game in Puerto Rico. He is an avid Batman fan and has a Batman tattoo on his forearm.

== See also ==
- List of second-generation Major League Baseball players
