= Reyes Moronta =

Dominican baseball player (1993–2024)

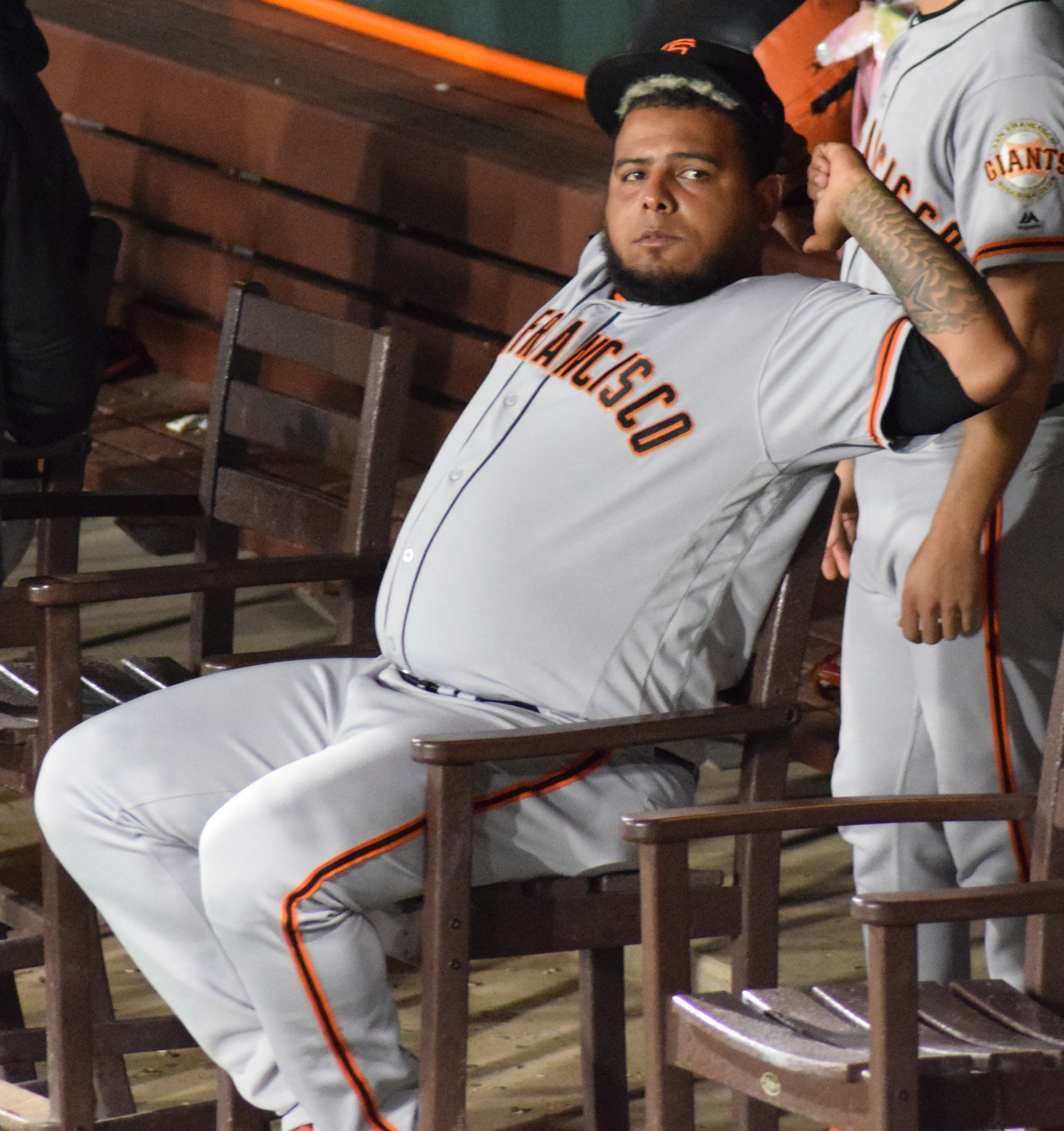
- Moronta with the San Francisco Giants in 2019
- Pitcher
- Born: January 6, 1993; Santiago, Dominican Republic
- Died: July 28, 2024 (aged 31); Villa González, Dominican Republic
- Batted: Right Threw: Right

MLB debut
- September 5, 2017, for the San Francisco Giants

Last MLB appearance
- May 24, 2023, for the Los Angeles Angels

MLB statistics
- Win–loss record: 10–11
- Earned run average: 3.05
- Strikeouts: 202
- Stats at Baseball Reference

Teams
- San Francisco Giants (2017–2019, 2021); Los Angeles Dodgers (2022); Arizona Diamondbacks (2022); Los Angeles Angels (2023)

Reyes Armando Moronta (January 6, 1993 – July 28, 2024) was a Dominican professional baseball pitcher. He played in Major League Baseball (MLB) for the San Francisco Giants, Los Angeles Dodgers, Arizona Diamondbacks, and Los Angeles Angels. Moronta signed with the Giants as an international free agent in 2010 and played in MLB from 2017 to 2023. He died on July 28, 2024, in an all-terrain vehicle accident in the Dominican Republic.

== Early life ==
Moronta was born January 6, 1993, to Francisco and Ivonne Moronta in Santiago in the Dominican Republic, the youngest of five children. His father was a truck driver, and his mother rolled cigars at a local factory. He grew up in the 700-person rural town of Quinigua, 5 miles (8.0 km) north of Santiago. For high school he attended Milagros Hernández Lyceum in Villa González.

== Professional career ==
=== San Francisco Giants ===
==== Minor leagues ====
Moronta signed with the San Francisco Giants as an international free agent in September 2010 at 17 years of age for $15,000. He made his professional debut in 2011 with the Dominican Summer League Giants. He played for the Arizona League Giants in 2012. He played as a starting pitcher with the Salem-Keizer Volcanoes in 2013, Arizona League Giants in 2014, and Augusta GreenJackets in 2015.

Moronta played for the San Jose Giants in 2016 and went 0–3 with 14 saves (3rd in the California League) and a 2.59 ERA in 60 games (leading the league) in which he pitched 59 innings and struck out 93 batters (14.2 strikeouts per nine innings pitched; leading the league). His fastball reached as high as 100 mph. He was a mid-season All Star, and a MiLB organization All Star. The Giants added him to their 40-man roster after the 2016 season.

==== Major leagues ====
The Giants promoted Moronta to the major leagues on May 10, 2017. During the 2017 season, Moronta pitched in seven games for the Giants, recording 11 strikeouts in 6 2/3 innings pitched (14.8 per 9 innings). In the minors, he pitched for three teams and was 3–1 with five saves and a 2.92 ERA. In 34 relief appearances, he pitched 37 innings and struck out 47 batters (11.4 per 9 innings).

In 2018, for the Giants, he was 5–2 with one save and a 2.49 ERA, as in 69 relief appearances (4th among NL rookies, and the most by a Giants rookie since Elias Sosa in 1973) he pitched 65 innings and struck out 79 batters (10.9 per 9 innings). He threw his four-seam fastball at an average 97.6 mph, and opposing batters hit .154 overall, .142 against his slider, and .132 as right-handed batters. In one stretch, he tied a Major League streak with 12 straight appearances without allowing a hit. He established the Giants record for fewest hits per 9 innings (4.71), with a minimum of 50 innings pitched.

In 2019, for the Giants, he was 3–7 with a 2.86 ERA, as in 56 relief appearances, he pitched 56.2 innings and struck out 70 batters (11.1 per 9 innings). He threw his four-seam fastball at an average 97.5 mph, and batters hit .123 against his slider. In September 2019 he underwent surgery to repair a torn labrum in his right shoulder, and was expected to miss nine to eleven months. He missed the 2020 season as a result.

On May 17, 2021, Moronta was placed on the 60-day injured list with a mild sprained ligament in his elbow. On September 21, Moronta was removed from the 40-man roster and assigned to the Triple-A Sacramento River Cats. On October 14, Moronta elected free agency.

=== Los Angeles Dodgers ===
On February 19, 2022, Moronta signed with the Diablos Rojos del México of the Mexican League. However, on March 12, 2022, prior to the start of the Mexican League season, Moronta signed a minor league contract with the Los Angeles Dodgers that included an invitation to spring training. He began the season in Triple-A with the Oklahoma City Dodgers but was added to the major league roster on April 24.

Moronta appeared in 22 games in the majors for Los Angeles, with a 4.18 ERA before he was designated for assignment on August 20.

=== Arizona Diamondbacks ===
On August 22, 2022, Moronta was claimed off waivers by the Arizona Diamondbacks. Moronta made 17 appearances for Arizona to close out the year. In 14 innings pitched, he logged a 2–2 record and 4.50 ERA while striking out 11 and collecting two saves. He was non-tendered and became a free agent on November 18.

=== Texas Rangers ===
On January 25, 2023, Moronta signed a minor league contract with the Texas Rangers organization. Moronta struggled to a 15.88 ERA in spring training before he was released on March 24.

=== Diablos Rojos del México ===
On April 3, 2023, Moronta signed with the Diablos Rojos del México of the Mexican League. In eight appearances for México, Moronta registered a 2.35 ERA with 13 strikeouts and one save in 7 2/3 innings pitched.

=== Los Angeles Angels ===
On May 11, 2023, Moronta signed a minor league contract with the Los Angeles Angels organization. He made three scoreless appearances for the Triple-A Salt Lake Bees, striking out nine in 4.0 innings pitched. On May 21, Moronta's contract was selected to the active roster. He made two appearances for the Angels, posting a 6.75 ERA in 1⅓ innings of work. On May 26, Moronta was designated for assignment following the promotion of Sam Bachman. He cleared waivers and was sent outright to Salt Lake on May 29. On October 4, Moronta elected free agency.

=== Bravos de León ===
On May 9, 2024, Moronta signed with the Bravos de León of the Mexican League. In 19 appearances for the Bravos, he struggled to an 8.69 ERA with 24 strikeouts and 4 saves across 19 2/3 innings pitched. Moronta was released by León on July 25.

== Death ==
On July 28, 2024, Moronta died in a motor vehicle collision in Villa González, Dominican Republic. He was 31. The crash occurred on an all-terrain vehicle outside of Moronta's father's house in Villa González.

== See also ==
- List of baseball players who died during their careers
