= Michael Reed (baseball) =

American baseball player (born 1992)

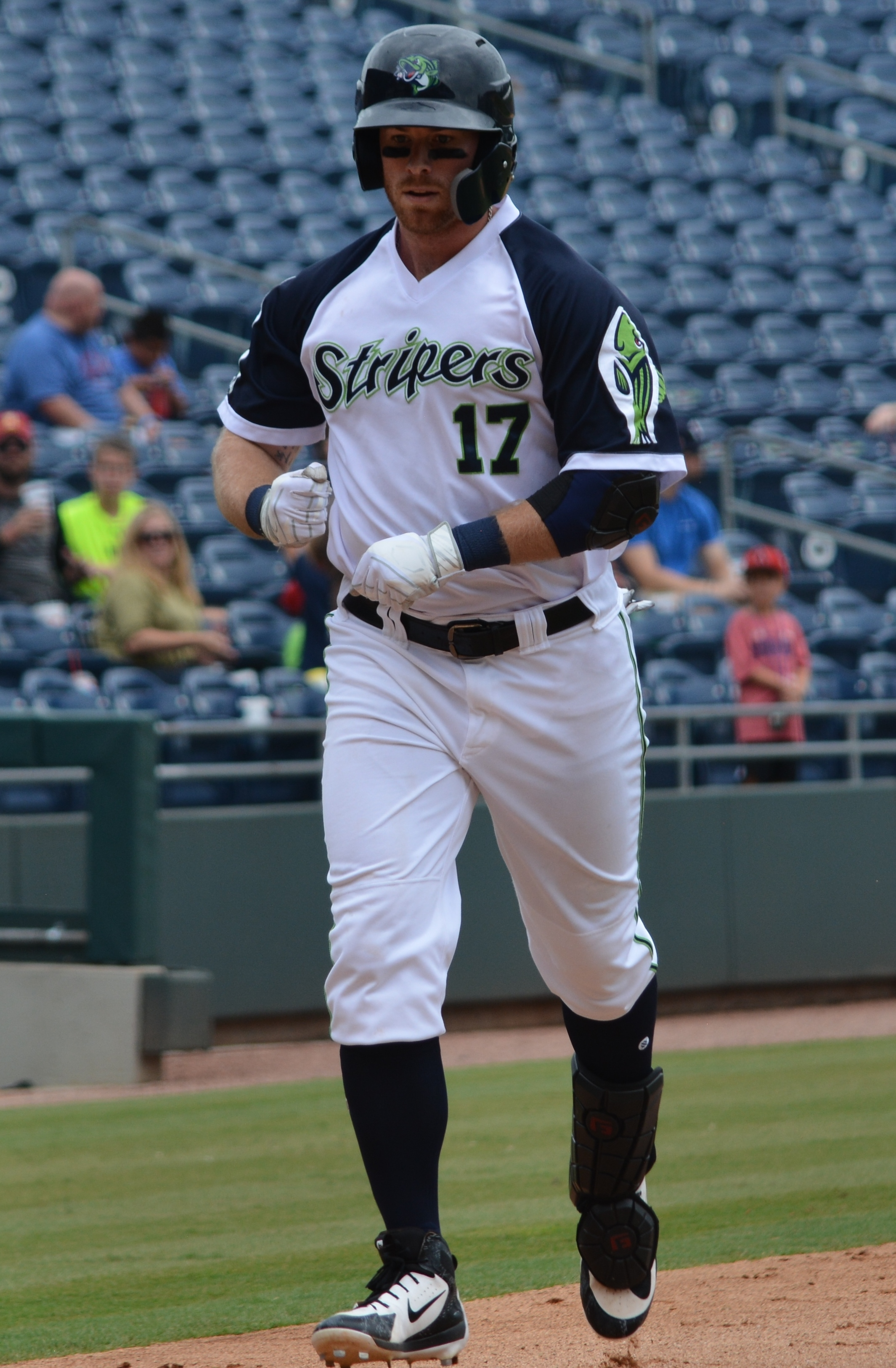
- Reed with the Gwinnett Stripers in 2018
- Outfielder
- Born: November 18, 1992 (age 33); Maplewood, Minnesota, U.S.
- Batted: Right Threw: Right

MLB debut
- September 26, 2015, for the Milwaukee Brewers

Last MLB appearance
- April 1, 2019, for the San Francisco Giants

MLB statistics
- Batting average: .186
- Home runs: 0
- Runs batted in: 0
- Stats at Baseball Reference

Teams
- Milwaukee Brewers (2015–2016); Atlanta Braves (2018); San Francisco Giants (2019)

Michael Benton Reed (born November 18, 1992) is an American former professional baseball outfielder. He played in Major League Baseball (MLB) for the Milwaukee Brewers, Atlanta Braves, and San Francisco Giants.

== High school ==
Reed was born in Maplewood, Minnesota. Before playing professionally, he attended Leander High School in Leander, Texas. He was named one of the top-200 prospects heading into the 2011 draft, coming in at #160.

== Professional career ==
=== Milwaukee Brewers ===
Though some thought he would go as high as the first round in the draft, he was taken by the Milwaukee Brewers in the 5th round of the 2011 Major League Baseball draft, one pick after pitcher Nick Tropeano. After hitting.232 his first minor league season, he stole 14 bases in 62 games between the Helena Brewers, Brevard County Manatees and Huntsville Stars in 2012 and in 2013, he hit.286 with a.385 on-base percentage, 13 triples and 26 stolen bases in 118 games for the Wisconsin Timber Rattlers. He finished second in the Midwest League in triples and was named to the MiLB.com Organization All-Star team that year. He hit.255 with a.396 on-base percentage and 33 stolen bases in 110 games for the Brevard County Manatees in 2014 after being named the Brewers' 15th-best prospect by MLB.com heading into the season. He was named Player of the Week during the week of May 5. He led the Florida State League in walks and was second in stolen bases as well.

Reed made his Major League Debut on September 26, 2015. Reed was one of nine players who competed to be the Brewers center fielder for the 2016 season.

Reed spent the 2017 season with the Double–A Biloxi Shuckers, playing in 54 games and hitting.208/.346/.351 with seven home runs and 17 RBI. He elected free agency following the season on November 6, 2017.

=== Atlanta Braves ===
On February 24, 2018, Reed signed a minor league deal with the Braves. He began the season with the Mississippi Braves and promoted to the Gwinnett Stripers of the Triple-A International League. He was called up to the major leagues on July 2, 2018, but was optioned back to Gwinnett the next day. He was recalled on July 20.

=== San Francisco Giants ===
On October 31, 2018, the Minnesota Twins claimed Reed off waivers. On March 23, 2019, the Twins traded Reed to the San Francisco Giants in exchange for John Andreoli and cash. In four games for the Giants, he went 0–for–8 with six strikeouts. Reed was designated for assignment on April 2, following the acquisition of Kevin Pillar. Reed cleared waivers and elected free agency on April 5, but re-signed with the Giants on a minor league contract on the same day. In 15 games for the Triple–A Sacramento River Cats, he batted.226/.317/.359 with one home run, nine RBI, and two stolen bases. Reed elected free agency following the season on November 4.

== Personal life ==
His father, Benton Reed, played in the National Football League.
