= Mike Gerber =

American baseball player (born 1992)

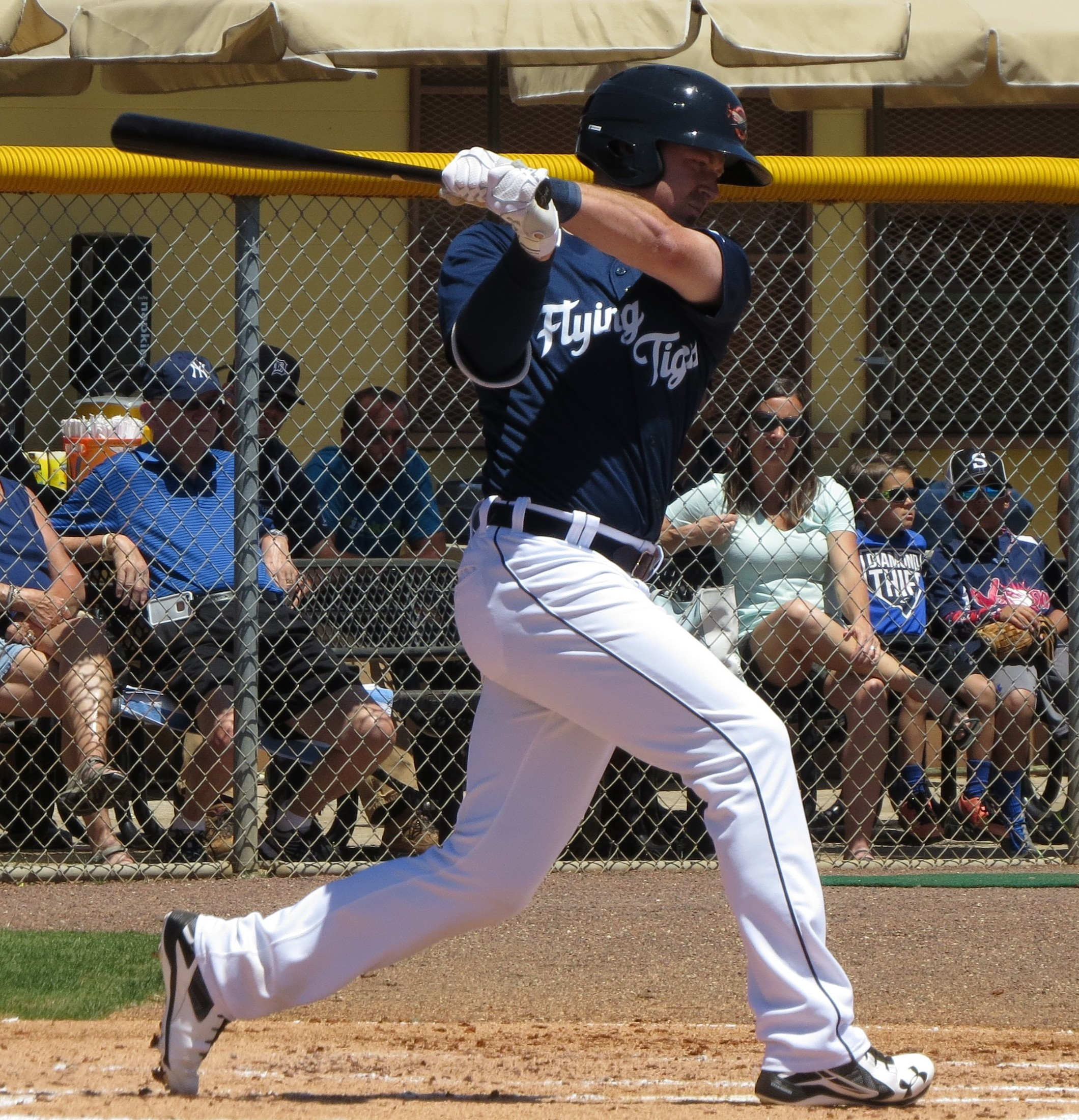
- Gerber with the Lakeland Flying Tigers
- Outfielder
- Born: July 8, 1992 (age 33); Nashville, Tennessee
- Batted: Left Threw: Right

Professional debut
- MLB: April 20, 2018, for the Detroit Tigers
- NPB: April 28, 2021, for the Chunichi Dragons

Last appearance
- MLB: September 27, 2019, for the San Francisco Giants
- NPB: August 18, 2021, for the Chunichi Dragons

MLB statistics
- Batting average: .076
- Home runs: 0
- Runs batted in: 2

NPB statistics
- Batting average: .156
- Home runs: 0
- Runs batted in: 1
- Stats at Baseball Reference

Teams
- Detroit Tigers (2018); San Francisco Giants (2019); Chunichi Dragons (2021)

Michael Jeffrey Gerber (born July 8, 1992) is an American former professional baseball outfielder. He previously played in Major League Baseball (MLB) for the Detroit Tigers and San Francisco Giants and in Nippon Professional Baseball (NPB) for the Chunichi Dragons.

== Career ==
Gerber was drafted by the New York Yankees in the 40th round of the 2010 Major League Baseball draft out of Neuqua Valley High School in Naperville, Illinois. He did not sign and attended Creighton University to play college baseball.

=== Detroit Tigers ===
Gerber was then drafted by the Detroit Tigers in the 15th round of the 2014 MLB draft. He made his professional debut with the Connecticut Tigers and also played with the West Michigan Whitecaps. Gerber spent 2015 with West Michigan and played in the Arizona Fall League after the season.

Gerber spent most of the 2017 season with the Double–A Erie SeaWolves. On November 20, 2017, Tigers added Gerber to their 40-man roster to protect him from the Rule 5 draft. On April 20, 2018, the Tigers added Gerber to the 25–man roster ahead of a doubleheader as the 26th man. He made his major league debut in the second game when he pinch-ran for Miguel Cabrera. Although he was sent back down after the doubleheader, Gerber was again called up three days later. After being returned to the minors, Gerber was recalled on July 31, following the deadline trade of Tigers outfielder Leonys Martín. That night, Gerber recorded his first career major league hit and first RBI. Batting in the bottom of the eighth inning against the Cincinnati Reds, he hit a line drive down the third base line for a double, scoring José Iglesias from first base. This turned out to be the game-winning RBI in a 2–1 Tigers victory.

=== San Francisco Giants ===
On December 10, 2018, Gerber was claimed off waivers by the San Francisco Giants from the Tigers. He had his contract purchased on May 3, 2019. He tied for the minor leagues lead in 2019 with 41 doubles, and batted .308/.368/.569. He was designated for assignment on November 5. Gerber elected free agency on November 12.

=== Colorado Rockies ===
On December 18, 2019, the Colorado Rockies signed Gerber to a minor league contract with an invitation to spring training. Gerber did not play in a game in 2020 due to the cancellation of the minor league season because of the COVID-19 pandemic. He became a free agent on November 2, 2020.

=== Chunichi Dragons ===
On December 2, 2020, it was reported that Gerber had reached a deal with the Chunichi Dragons in the Nippon Professional Baseball League. On April 28, 2021, Gerber made his NPB debut. Gerber hit .156/.174/.178 in 12 games with the Dragons. On October 20, 2021, the Dragons announced that Gerber would not return to the team in 2022.
