= Zach Green =

American baseball player (born 1994)

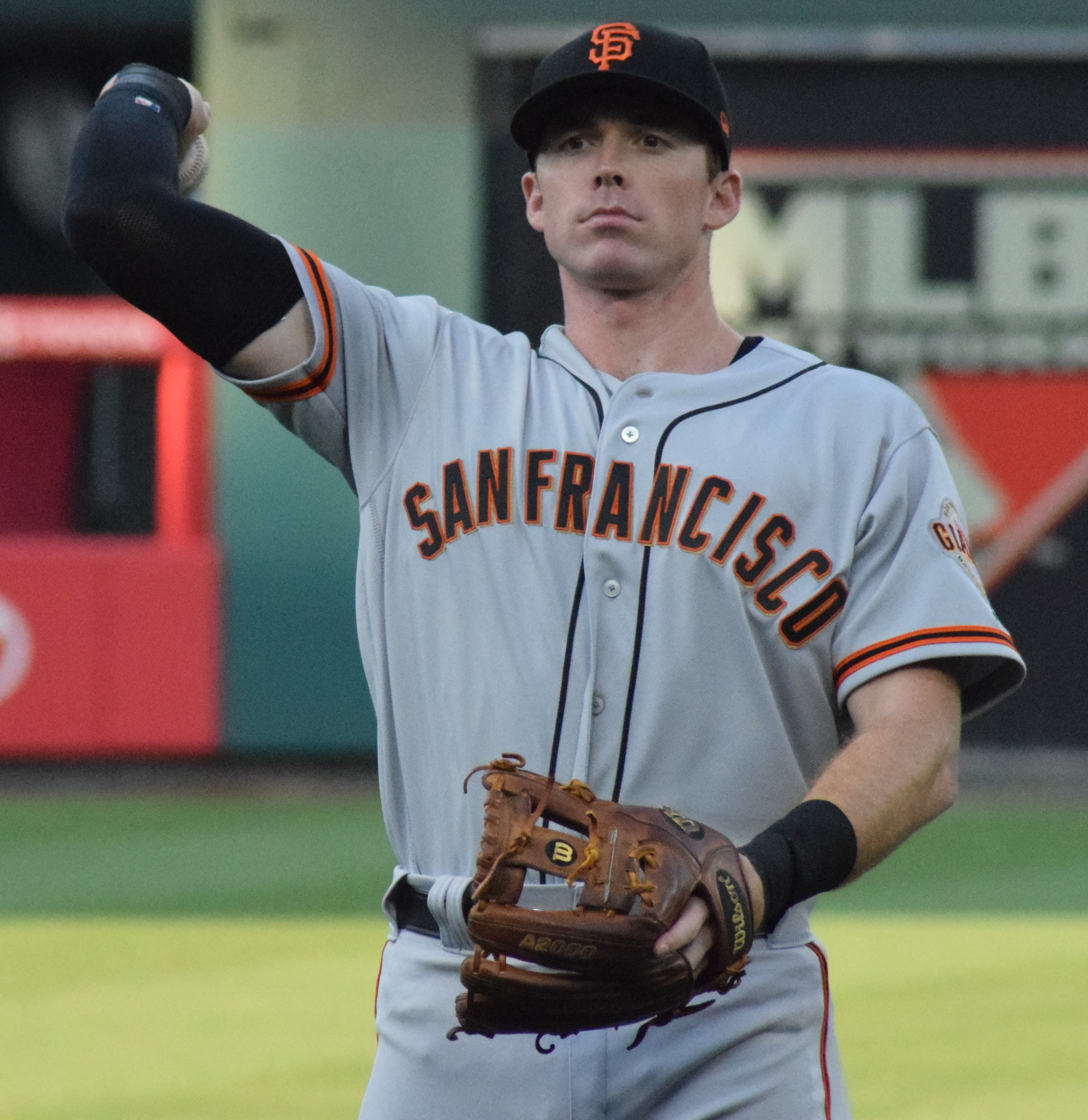
- Green with the Giants in 2019
- Infielder
- Born: March 7, 1994 (age 32); Sacramento, California, U.S.
- Batted: Right Threw: Right

MLB debut
- July 21, 2019, for the San Francisco Giants

Last MLB appearance
- August 3, 2019, for the San Francisco Giants

MLB statistics
- Batting average: .143
- Home runs: 0
- Runs batted in: 1
- Stats at Baseball Reference

Teams
- San Francisco Giants (2019)

Zachary Green (born March 7, 1994) is an American former professional baseball infielder. He was drafted by the Philadelphia Phillies in the 3rd round of the 2012 MLB draft. He played in Major League Baseball (MLB) for the San Francisco Giants, with whom he made his MLB debut in 2019.

== Career ==
Green attended Jesuit High School in Carmichael, California.

=== Philadelphia Phillies ===
He was drafted by the Philadelphia Phillies in the 3rd round, with the 125th overall selection, of the 2012 MLB draft, and signed for a $420,000 signing bonus.

In 2012, Green played for the Gulf Coast Phillies, hitting .284/.333/.426 with 3 home runs and 21 RBIs. In 2013, he played for the Williamsport Crosscutters, hitting .252/.344/.478 with 13 home runs and 41 RBI. He spent the 2014 season with the Lakewood BlueClaws, hitting .268/.316/.402/.718 with 6 home runs and 43 RBI. He spent the 2015 season with the Clearwater Threshers, hitting .173/.216/.221 with one home run and 7 RBI, in just 26 games due to a wrist injury. He returned to Clearwater in the 2016 season, hitting .263/.326/.432 with 12 home runs and 63 RBI. In the 2016 season, he played through pain that was resolved by undergoing Tommy John surgery and a surgery to fix a hip ailment. He split the 2017 season between the GCL Phillies, Clearwater, and the Reading Fightin Phils, hitting a combined .227/.291/.424 with 9 home runs and 26 RBI. His 2018 season was split between Reading and the Lehigh Valley IronPigs, hitting a combined .281/.356/.532 with 20 home runs and 75 RBI. Green elected free agency following the season on November 2, 2018.

=== San Francisco Giants ===
On January 24, 2019, Green signed a minor league contract with the San Francisco Giants. He opened the 2019 season with the Triple–A Sacramento River Cats, for whom he batted .282/.380/.659 with 25 home runs and 64 RBI in 252 at bats.

On July 21, 2019, the Giants selected Green's contract and promoted him to the major leagues for the first time. He made his major league debut that day versus the New York Mets. In eight games for the Giants, Green went 2–for–14 (.143) with no home runs and one RBI. On November 4, he was removed from the 40–man roster and sent outright to Triple–A, after which he elected free agency. Green subsequently re–signed with San Francisco on a minor league contract.

Green did not play in a game in 2020 due to the cancellation of the minor league season because of the COVID-19 pandemic. He became a free agent on November 2, 2020.

=== Milwaukee Brewers ===
On December 3, 2020, Green signed a minor league contract with the Milwaukee Brewers organization. In 2021, Green spent the year with the Triple-A Nashville Sounds, slashing .214/.310/.407 with 15 home runs and 64 RBI in 101 games with the team. Green elected free agency following the season on November 7, 2021.

=== Seattle Mariners ===
On March 16, 2022, Green signed a minor league contract with the Seattle Mariners organization. In 91 games for the Triple-A Tacoma Rainiers, he slashed .227/.291/.460 with 18 home runs and 52 RBI. Green elected free agency following the season on November 10.
