= John Andreoli =

American baseball player (born 1990)

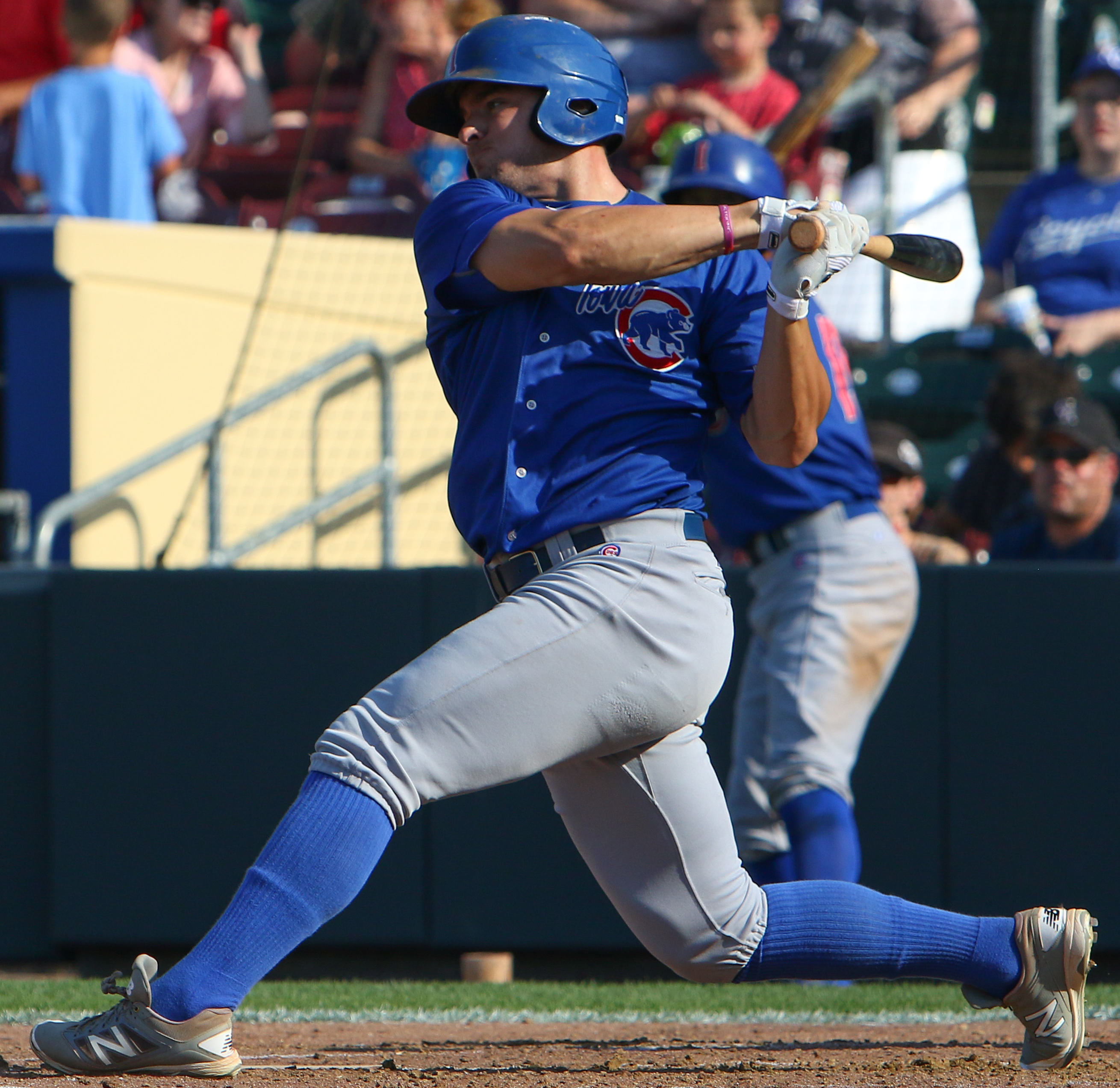
- Andreoli with the Iowa Cubs in 2016
- Outfielder
- Born: June 9, 1990 (age 36); Worcester, Massachusetts, U.S.
- Batted: Right Threw: Right

MLB debut
- May 23, 2018, for the Seattle Mariners

Last MLB appearance
- May 17, 2021, for the San Diego Padres

MLB statistics
- Batting average: .224
- Home runs: 0
- Runs batted in: 4
- Stats at Baseball Reference

Teams
- Seattle Mariners (2018); Baltimore Orioles (2018); San Diego Padres (2021)

John Francis Andreoli (born June 9, 1990) is an American former professional baseball outfielder. He played in Major League Baseball (MLB) for the Seattle Mariners, Baltimore Orioles, and San Diego Padres. He also played for the Italian national baseball team in the 2017 World Baseball Classic and at the 2019 European Baseball Championship.

== Career ==
=== Amateur career ===
Andreoli graduated from St. John's High School in Shrewsbury, Massachusetts, in 2008. He lettered in football and baseball. He attended the University of Connecticut, where he played college baseball for the Connecticut Huskies. In 2010, he played collegiate summer baseball with the Brewster Whitecaps and Wareham Gatemen of the Cape Cod Baseball League, and returned to the league in 2011 to play again for Wareham.

=== Chicago Cubs ===
The Chicago Cubs selected Andreoli in the 17th round of the 2011 MLB draft. He signed and spent 2011 with both the AZL Cubs and the Peoria Chiefs, playing in ten games between both teams. In 2012, he played for the Daytona Cubs, batting .289 with one home run and 25 RBIs in 121 games. He was named an FSL All-Star in 2012, and returned to Daytona to begin in 2013. He was promoted to the Tennessee Smokies. In 127 games between both teams, he slashed .305/.379/.402 with two home runs and 44 RBIs.

He spent 2014 back with the Smokies, compiling a .211 batting average in 61 games. After the 2014 season, he played winter baseball for the Senadores de San Juan of the Liga de Béisbol Profesional Roberto Clemente. In 2015, he played for the Iowa Cubs where he batted .277 with five home runs and 32 RBIs in 106 games.

The Cubs invited him to spring training as a non-roster player in 2016. He returned to Iowa for the 2016 season and compiled a .256 batting average with 12 home runs and 61 RBIs and 43 stolen bases in 140 games, and he returned to Iowa again in 2017, batting .244 with 14 home runs and 49 RBIs in 119 games. He elected minor league free agency following the season on November 6, 2017.

=== Seattle Mariners ===
On December 13, 2017, Andreoli signed a minor league contract with the Seattle Mariners. He began the season with the Tacoma Rainiers. Seattle promoted him to the major leagues on May 23. He made his MLB debut that same day, and recorded his first hit. He was optioned back to Tacoma on May 28, and recalled to the Mariners on July 7. On August 17, Andreoli was designated for assignment by the Mariners after notching only 1 hit in 5 at-bats.

=== Baltimore Orioles ===
On August 19, 2018, Andreoli was claimed off waivers by the Baltimore Orioles and was assigned to the Norfolk Tides of the Triple-A International League. He was called up by the Orioles August 20. He had the fastest baserunning sprint speed of all major league left fielders, at 29.8 feet/second. Andreoli hit .232/.279/.268 with 4 RBI in 23 games for Baltimore.

=== Seattle Mariners (second stint) ===
On October 31, 2018, Andreoli was claimed off waivers by the Seattle Mariners. On January 10, 2019, Andreoli was designated for assignment by the Mariners.

=== Texas Rangers ===
On January 15, 2019, Andreoli was claimed off waivers by the Texas Rangers. Andreoli was designated for assignment on January 29, following the signing of Shawn Kelley.

=== San Francisco Giants ===
On February 1, 2019, Andreoli was claimed off waivers by the San Francisco Giants. Andreoli was designated for assignment on February 5, after the acquisition of Jake Barrett and was outrighted on February 10. Andreoli attended spring training as a non-roster invitee of the Giants.

=== Minnesota Twins ===
On March 23, 2019, the Giants traded Andreoli and cash considerations to the Minnesota Twins for Michael Reed. He was assigned to the Triple-A Rochester Red Wings, and hit .196 with 4 home runs in 43 games.

=== Seattle Mariners (third stint) ===
On June 2, 2019, Andreoli was traded to the Seattle Mariners. He spent the remainder of the year in Triple-A Tacoma, hitting .290/.405/.522 with 10 home runs and 32 RBI. On November 4, 2019, Andreoli elected free agency.

=== Boston Red Sox ===
On December 20, 2019, the Boston Red Sox signed Andreoli to a minor league deal and invited him to spring training. Andreoli did not play in a game in 2020 due to the cancellation of the minor league season because of the COVID-19 pandemic. He was released on August 7, 2020.

=== San Diego Padres ===
On February 16, 2021, Andreoli signed a minor league contract with the San Diego Padres organization. On May 11, 2021, Andreoli was selected to the active roster. On May 19, Andreoli was removed from the 40-man roster and returned to the Triple-A El Paso Chihuahuas. Andreoli notched a double in 7 plate appearances in 7 games with Padres.

=== Philadelphia Phillies ===
On March 8, 2022, Andreoli signed a minor league deal with the Philadelphia Phillies. He played in 36 games for the Triple-A Lehigh Valley IronPigs, hitting .154/.336/.260 with 2 home runs, 11 RBI, and 6 stolen bases.

=== Minnesota Twins (second stint) ===
On May 30, 2022, Andreoli was traded to the Minnesota Twins. Playing in 74 games for the Triple-A St. Paul Saints, Andreoli batted .197/.338/.408 with 13 home runs, 32 RBI, and 13 stolen bases. He elected free agency following the season on November 10.

Andreoli retired from professional baseball following the 2022 season and joined the Sullivan Insurance Group.

== International baseball ==
Andreoli played for the Italian national baseball team in the 2017 World Baseball Classic. He hit three home runs for Italy, but his team was eliminated in Pool D. He also played for Team Italy at the 2019 European Baseball Championship and in the Africa/Europe 2020 Olympic Qualification tournament.

== Personal life ==
Andreoli's father, also named John, played for the New England Patriots. He is the cousin of major league pitchers Daniel and Luke Bard.
