= 2021 San Francisco Giants season =

2021 San Francisco Giants
- National League West champions
- League: National League
- Division: West
- Ballpark: Oracle Park
- City: San Francisco, California
- Record: 107–55 (.660)
- Divisional place: 1st
- Owners: Charles B. Johnson (Majority shareholder); Greg E. Johnson (Chairman)
- President: Larry Baer
- President of baseball operations: Farhan Zaidi
- Managers: Gabe Kapler
- Television: KNTV (NBC Bay Area 11) (Jon Miller, Mike Krukow, Duane Kuiper, Dave Flemming); NBC Sports Bay Area (Duane Kuiper, Mike Krukow, Dave Flemming, Jon Miller, Shawn Estes, Javier López, Hunter Pence, JT Snow, Randy Winn)
- Radio: KNBR (104.5 FM and 680 AM); San Francisco Giants Radio Network (Jon Miller, Dave Flemming, Duane Kuiper, Mike Krukow); KXZM (93.7 FM, Spanish) (Erwin Higueros, Tito Fuentes, Marvin Benard)
- Stats: ESPN.com; Baseball Reference

The 2021 season was the 139th season for the San Francisco Giants in Major League Baseball (MLB), their 64th year in San Francisco, and their 22nd at Oracle Park. It was the Giants' second season under manager Gabe Kapler, who managed his first 162-game season with the club (after the 2020 season was shortened to 60 games because of the COVID-19 pandemic), and he led them to the best record in both the league and franchise history.

On September 13, the Giants clinched a spot in the postseason for the first time since 2016 and became the first team to clinch a spot in the 2021 postseason. On September 29, the Giants won their 104th game of the season, which set a San Francisco era record for most wins in a season. On October 3, the Giants won the National League West title and home-field advantage throughout the entire playoffs. It was their ninth division title in franchise history, and their first since 2012. It was also their 107th win of the season, which set a new franchise record for most wins. It broke the previous record of 106 wins set by the 1904 New York Giants.

In the 2021 regular season, the Giants' batters led the National League in home runs (241), slugging percentage (.440), OPS (.769), intentional walks (45), pitches per plate appearance (3.99), stolen base percentage (83%), and pull percentage (30.2%). They hit 18 pinch-hit home runs, a major league record. Of all NL teams, they had the highest batting average (.280), on-base percentage (.368), slugging percentage (.461), and OPS (.829) from the catcher position, the highest slugging percentage (.588) and OPS (.969) from the first base position, and the most RBIs from the shortstop position (108). They were second in the NL in runs (804), RBIs (768), walks (602), and batting average (.249).

The team's pitchers led the NL in fewest home runs (151), fewest walks (416), and strikeouts/walk (3.43). They tied for the league lead with 56 saves and fewest hit batters (63).

Manager Gabe Kapler began the 2021 season with a coaching staff of 13, including nine who had never been on a major league staff before he hired them, and most of them were young enough to be playing themselves. In the 2021 regular season, his Giants winning percentage rose from .483 to .660, the 12 overturns caused by his challenges were tied for the most in the majors, and he was one of only two managers who were not ejected during the season. He used more pinch hitters per game than any other major league manager for the second season in a row (2.60), and the second-most pitchers per game (4.7).

The Giants lost in five games to the Los Angeles Dodgers in the NLDS.

Kapler was named the Sporting News 2021 NL Manager of the Year.

== Offseason ==
- January 14, 2021 − The Giants signed LHP Alex Wood to a one-year contract.
- February 4, 2021 − The Giants signed INF Tommy La Stella to a three-year contract.
- February 4, 2021 – The Giants acquired OF LaMonte Wade in a trade with the Minnesota Twins in exchange for RHP Shaun Anderson.

The Giants participated in the Cactus League during spring training. The team won 11 and lost 12 of their 28 games; the remaining 5 games were tied and not included in the standings.

== Regular season ==
For the 12th consecutive year, the Giants started their season on the road. They began 2021 against the Seattle Mariners, the first time that either team had opened a season with an interleague game. Evan Longoria and Buster Posey became only the second pair of Giants teammates—after Benito Santiago and Ray Durham in 2003—to homer in each of the team's first two games of a season since at least 1901. In mid-April, the Giants shut out the Miami Marlins and Philadelphia Phillies in consecutive games, marking the club's first back-to-back team shutouts since September 2018.

Facing the Colorado Rockies at Coors Field, the Giants scored 10 runs in the first inning for the first time since 1967.

The Giants came back from a 7–0 deficit to beat the Arizona Diamondbacks in mid-June. Mike Yastrzemski hit a grand slam into McCovey Cove and he and Steven Duggar became the first pair of Giants teammates to each get a splash hit home run in the same game.

The Giants clinched a playoff berth with a 9–1 win in San Francisco against the San Diego Padres on September 13th. They would have to wait until the final game of the regular season on October 3rd to clinch the NL West title. This happened at home in an 11–4 win against the San Diego Padres, securing San Francisco's 107th win of the season and outlasting a late surge from their NL West rival Dodgers. The Dodgers had been tied with the Giants as recently as September 4th and had not been more than 2.5 games back for the division since then. Had the Giants instead lost in Game 162, they would have had to face the Dodgers in a winner-takes-all Game 163 in San Francisco to determine the division champion.

== Season standings ==
=== National League West ===
NL West
Team	W	L	Pct.	GB	Home	Road
San Francisco Giants	107	55	.660	—	54‍–‍27	53‍–‍28
Los Angeles Dodgers	106	56	.654	1	58‍–‍23	48‍–‍33
San Diego Padres	79	83	.488	28	45‍–‍36	34‍–‍47
Colorado Rockies	74	87	.460	32½	48‍–‍33	26‍–‍54
Arizona Diamondbacks	52	110	.321	55	32‍–‍49	20‍–‍61

=== National League division standings ===
Division leaders
Team	W	L	Pct.
San Francisco Giants	107	55	.660
Milwaukee Brewers	95	67	.586
Atlanta Braves	88	73	.547

Wild Card teams (Top 2 teams qualify for postseason)
Team	W	L	Pct.	GB
Los Angeles Dodgers	106	56	.654	+16
St. Louis Cardinals	90	72	.556	—
Cincinnati Reds	83	79	.512	7
Philadelphia Phillies	82	80	.506	8
San Diego Padres	79	83	.488	11
New York Mets	77	85	.475	13
Colorado Rockies	74	87	.460	15½
Chicago Cubs	71	91	.438	19
Miami Marlins	67	95	.414	23
Washington Nationals	65	97	.401	25
Pittsburgh Pirates	61	101	.377	29
Arizona Diamondbacks	52	110	.321	38

=== Record vs. opponents ===
2021 National League record Source: MLB Standings Grid – 2021
Team	AZ	ATL	CHC	CIN	COL	LAD	MIA	MIL	NYM	PHI	PIT	SD	SF	STL	WSH	AL
Arizona	—	3–4	2–4	5–1	9–10	3–16	2–5	1–6	1–5	4–3	4–2	8–11	2–17	1–6	3–4	4–16
Atlanta	4–3	—	5–2	4–3	2–4	2–4	11–8	3–3	10–9	10–9	4–3	4–2	3–3	6–1	14–5	6–14
Chicago	4–2	2–5	—	8–11	3–3	4–3	1–5	4–15	4–3	2–5	14–5	5–1	1–6	9–10	4–3	6–14
Cincinnati	1–5	3–4	11–8	—	5–2	3–3	5–2	9–10	3–3	4–2	13–6	1–6	1–6	10–9	5–2	9–11
Colorado	10–9	4–2	3–3	2–5	—	6–13	4–2	2–5	2–5	5–2	4–2	11–8	4–15	3–4	4–2	10–10
Los Angeles	16–3	4–2	3–4	3–3	13–6	—	3–4	4–3	6–1	4–2	6–0	12–7	9–10	4–3	7–0	12–8
Miami	5–2	8–11	5–1	2–5	2–4	4–3	—	3–3	9–10	10–9	2–5	3–4	3–4	0–6	8–11	3–17
Milwaukee	6–1	3–3	15–4	10–9	5–2	3–4	3–3	—	4–2	2–5	14–5	5–2	4–3	8–11	5–1	8–12
New York	5–1	9–10	3–4	3–3	5–2	1–6	10–9	2–4	—	9–10	3–4	4–3	1–5	2–5	11–8	9–11
Philadelphia	3–4	9–10	5–2	2–4	2–5	2–4	9–10	5–2	10–9	—	4–3	4–2	2–4	4–3	13–6	8–12
Pittsburgh	2–4	3–4	5–14	6–13	2–4	0–6	5–2	5–14	4–3	3–4	—	3–4	4–3	7–12	2–4	10–10
San Diego	11–8	2–4	1–5	6–1	8–11	7–12	4–3	2–5	3–4	2–4	4–3	—	8–11	3–3	4–3	14–6
San Francisco	17–2	3–3	6–1	6–1	15–4	10–9	4–3	3–4	5–1	4–2	3–4	11–8	—	2–4	5–2	13–7
St. Louis	6–1	1–6	10–9	9–10	4–3	3–4	6–0	11–8	5–2	3–4	12–7	3–3	4–2	—	2–4	11–9
Washington	4–3	5–14	3–4	2–5	2–4	0–7	11–8	1–5	8–11	6–13	4–2	3–4	2–5	4–2	—	10–10

=== Game log ===
Legend
	Giants win
	Giants loss
	Postponement
	Clinched playoff spot
	Clinched division
**Bold**	Giants team member

2021 Game Log: 107–55 (Home: 54–27; Away: 53–28)
April: 16–10 (Home: 10–3; Away: 6–7)

#	Date	Opponent	Score	Win	Loss	Save	Attendance	Record
1	April 1	@ Mariners	7–8 (10)	Misiewicz (1–0)	**Álvarez** (0–1)	—	8,174	0–1
2	April 2	@ Mariners	6–3	**Peralta** (1–0)	Steckenrider (0–1)	**McGee** (1)	8,392	1–1
3	April 3	@ Mariners	0–4	Flexen (1–0)	**Webb** (0–1)	Montero (1)	8,651	1–2
4	April 5	@ Padres	3–2	**Baragar** (1–0)	Stammen (0–1)	**McGee** (2)	10,350	2–2
5	April 6	@ Padres	1–3	Kela (1–0)	**Wisler** (0–1)	Melancon (3)	10,350	2–3
6	April 7	@ Padres	3–2 (10)	**McGee** (1–0)	Hill (0–1)	**Peralta** (1)	10,350	3–3
7	April 9	Rockies	3–1	**Cueto** (1–0)	Gomber (0–2)	**McGee** (3)	7,390	4–3
8	April 10	Rockies	4–3	**Baragar** (2–0)	Bowden (0–2)	**McGee** (4)	6,176	5–3
9	April 11	Rockies	4–0	**DeSclafani** (1–0)	Márquez (0–1)	—	6,560	6–3
10	April 12	Reds	0–3	Miley (2–0)	**Sanchez** (0–1)	Sims (1)	3,662	6–4
11	April 13	Reds	7–6	**Peralta** (2–0)	Pérez (1–1)	**McGee** (5)	3,673	7–4
12	April 14	Reds	3–0	**Cueto** (2–0)	Mahle (1–1)	**McGee** (6)	6,409	8–4
13	April 16	@ Marlins	1–4	Bass (1–2)	**Wisler** (0–2)	García (3)	5,734	8–5
14	April 17	@ Marlins	6–7 (10)	García (2–1)	**García** (0–1)	—	6,014	8–6
15	April 18	@ Marlins	1–0	**Wood** (1–0)	López (0–2)	**Rogers** (1)	6,129	9–6
16	April 19	@ Phillies	2–0	**Gausman** (1–0)	Anderson (0–2)	**Peralta** (2)	9,510	10–6
17	April 20	@ Phillies	10–7	**Álvarez** (1–1)	Brogdon (3–1)	—	10,584	11–6
18	April 21	@ Phillies	5–6	Neris (1–1)	**Peralta** (2–1)	—	9,537	11–7
19	April 22	Marlins	3–0	**Sanchez** (1–1)	Castano (0–1)	**McGee** (7)	4,580	12–7
20	April 23	Marlins	5–3	**Wood** (2–0)	Alcántara (0–2)	—	6,657	13–7
21	April 24	Marlins	2–5	Floro (1–1)	**Santos** (0–1)	—	8,282	13–8
22	April 25	Marlins	4–3	**Webb** (1–1)	Campbell (0–1)	**Rogers** (2)	7,572	14–8
23	April 26	Rockies	12–0	**DeSclafani** (2–0)	Gomber (1–3)	—	4,129	15–8
24	April 27	Rockies	5–7 (10)	Bard (1–1)	**Santos** (0–2)	Estévez (1)	5,595	15–9
25	April 28	Rockies	7–3	**Wood** (3–0)	Márquez (1–2)	—	6,163	16–9
26	April 30	@ Padres	2–3	Darvish (3–1)	**Webb** (1–2)	Melancon (9)	15,250	16–10

May: 18–10 (Home: 5–4; Away: 13–6)

#	Date	Opponent	Score	Win	Loss	Save	Attendance	Record
27	May 1	@ Padres	2–6	Snell (1–0)	**DeSclafani** (2–1)	—	15,250	16–11
28	May 2	@ Padres	7–1	**Gausman** (2–0)	Musgrove (2–3)	—	15,250	17–11
–	May 3	@ Rockies	Postponed (Rain; Makeup: May 4)					
29	May 4 (1)	@ Rockies	12–4 (7)	**Wisler** (1–2)	Márquez (1–3)	—	10,213	18–11
30	May 4 (2)	@ Rockies	6–8 (7)	Bowden (1–2)	**Doval** (0–1)	—	10,213	18–12
31	May 5	@ Rockies	5–6	Gray (4–2)	**Webb** (1–3)	Bard (3)	9,521	18–13
32	May 7	Padres	5–4	**Doval** (1–1)	Kela (2–2)	**McGee** (8)	9,219	19–13
33	May 8	Padres	7–1	**Gausman** (3–0)	Musgrove (2–4)	—	9,764	20–13
34	May 9	Padres	1–11	Weathers (2–1)	**Cueto** (2–1)	—	10,008	20–14
35	May 10	Rangers	3–1	**Wood** (4–0)	King (4–2)	**McGee** (9)	7,450	21–14
36	May 11	Rangers	4–2	**Webb** (2–3)	Lyles (1–3)	**McGee** (10)	7,268	22–14
37	May 13	@ Pirates	3–1	**DeSclafani** (3–1)	Crowe (0–2)	**Rogers** (3)	4,099	23–14
38	May 14	@ Pirates	2–3 (11)	Oviedo (1–1)	**Baragar** (2–1)	—	6,743	23–15
39	May 15	@ Pirates	6–8	Rodríguez (2–0)	**McGee** (1–1)	—	7,833	23–16
40	May 16	@ Pirates	4–1	**Wood** (5–0)	Keller (2–5)	**Rogers** (4)	7,356	24–16
41	May 17	@ Reds	6–3	**Webb** (3–3)	Gray (0–3)	**Rogers** (5)	11,004	25–16
42	May 18	@ Reds	4–2	**DeSclafani** (4–1)	Castillo (1–6)	**McGee** (11)	8,745	26–16
43	May 19	@ Reds	4–0	**Gausman** (4–0)	Miley (4–4)	—	10,326	27–16
44	May 20	@ Reds	19–4	**Cueto** (3–1)	Mahle (2–2)	—	11,656	28–16
45	May 21	Dodgers	1–2	Bauer (5–2)	**Wood** (5–1)	Treinen (2)	12,753	28–17
46	May 22	Dodgers	3–6	Buehler (3–0)	**Kazmir** (0–1)	Jansen (11)	13,660	28–18
47	May 23	Dodgers	5–11	Urías (7–1)	**DeSclafani** (4–2)	—	13,346	28–19
48	May 25	@ Diamondbacks	8–0	**Gausman** (5–0)	Martin (0–2)	—	10,311	29–19
49	May 26	@ Diamondbacks	5–4	**Tropeano** (1–0)	Young (1–4)	**Rogers** (6)	8,597	30–19
50	May 27	@ Dodgers	3–4	González (2–0)	**Wood** (5–2)	Jansen (12)	16,343	30–20
51	May 28	@ Dodgers	8–5 (10)	**Rogers** (1–0)	Jansen (0–2)	**García** (1)	17,873	31–20
52	May 29	@ Dodgers	11–6	**Webb** (4–3)	Urías (7–2)	—	19,097	32–20
53	May 30	@ Dodgers	5–4	**Gausman** (6–0)	Kershaw (7–4)	**McGee** (12)	18,155	33–20
54	May 31	Angels	6–1	**Cueto** (4–1)	Bundy (0–6)	—	13,144	34–20

June: 16–9 (Home: 11–4; Away: 5–5)

#	Date	Opponent	Score	Win	Loss	Save	Attendance	Record
55	June 1	Angels	1–8	Heaney (3–3)	**Wood** (5–3)	—	10,546	34–21
56	June 3	Cubs	7–2	**DeSclafani** (5–2)	Davies (2–3)	—	10,737	35–21
57	June 4	Cubs	8–5	**Menez** (1–0)	Arrieta (5–6)	**Rogers** (7)	11,524	36–21
58	June 5	Cubs	4–3	**Gausman** (7–0)	Stewart (1–1)	**Rogers** (8)	12,792	37–21
59	June 6	Cubs	3–4	Hendricks (7–4)	**Cueto** (4–2)	Kimbrel (14)	14,089	37–22
60	June 8	@ Rangers	9–4	**Álvarez** (2–1)	Rodríguez (1–3)	—	24,938	38–22
61	June 9	@ Rangers	3–4 (11)	Martin (1–2)	**McGee** (1–2)	—	25,803	38–23
—	June 10	@ Nationals	Postponed (Rain; Makeup: June 12)					
62	June 11	@ Nationals	1–0	**DeSclafani** (6–2)	Espino (0–2)	—	18,029	39–23
63	June 12 (1)	@ Nationals	0–2 (7)	Fedde (4–4)	**Gausman** (7–1)	Hand (11)	16,425	39–24
64	June 12 (2)	@ Nationals	2–1 (8)	**McGee** (2–2)	Finnegan (2–2)	**Baragar** (1)	24,066	40–24
65	June 13	@ Nationals	0–5	Ross (3–6)	**Cueto** (4–3)	—	21,569	40–25
66	June 14	Diamondbacks	5–2	**Wood** (6–3)	Peacock (2–4)	**McGee** (13)	9,906	41–25
67	June 15	Diamondbacks	9–8	**Sherfy** (1–0)	Castellanos (0–1)	**Rogers** (9)	9,867	42–25
68	June 16	Diamondbacks	13–7	**DeSclafani** (7–2)	Kelly (2–7)	—	11,004	43–25
69	June 17	Diamondbacks	10–3	**Gausman** (8–1)	Gallen (1–2)	—	13,144	44–25
70	June 18	Phillies	5–3	**Cueto** (5–3)	Velasquez (2–2)	**McGee** (14)	16,170	45–25
71	June 19	Phillies	6–13	Suárez (3–1)	**García** (0–2)	—	16,774	45–26
72	June 20	Phillies	11–2	**Long** (1–0)	Eflin (2–6)	—	18,265	46–26
73	June 22	@ Angels	5–0	**DeSclafani** (8–2)	Heaney (4–5)	—	28,354	47–26
74	June 23	@ Angels	9–3 (13)	**Leone** (1–0)	Claudio (1–2)	—	20,620	48–26
75	June 25	Athletics	2–0	**Cueto** (6–3)	Manaea (6–4)	**McGee** (15)	36,928	49–26
76	June 26	Athletics	6–5 (10)	**McGee** (3–2)	Smith (1–1)	—	33,168	50–26
77	June 27	Athletics	2–6	Irvin (6–7)	**Long** (1–1)	—	35,920	50–27
78	June 28	@ Dodgers	2–3	Bauer (8–5)	**DeSclafani** (8–3)	Jansen (19)	47,835	50–28
79	June 29	@ Dodgers	1–3	Buehler (8–1)	**Gausman** (8–2)	Jansen (20)	52,342	50–29

July: 15–10 (Home: 8–6; Away: 7–4)

#	Date	Opponent	Score	Win	Loss	Save	Attendance	Record
80	July 1	@ Diamondbacks	3–5	Kelly (5–7)	**Cueto** (6–4)	Soria (1)	9,172	50–30
81	July 2	@ Diamondbacks	11–4	**Wood** (7–3)	Gallen (1–4)	—	12,262	51–30
82	July 3	@ Diamondbacks	6–5	**Leone** (2–0)	Buchter (0–2)	**McGee** (16)	23,689	52–30
83	July 4	@ Diamondbacks	5–2	**DeSclafani** (9–3)	Smith (2–5)	**Rogers** (10)	27,032	53–30
84	July 5	Cardinals	3–5	Kim (3–5)	**Gausman** (8–3)	—	32,644	53–31
85	July 6	Cardinals	5–6	Wainwright (7–5)	**Cueto** (6–5)	Miller (1)	18,785	53–32
86	July 7	Cardinals	5–2	**Wood** (8–3)	Oviedo (0–5)	**McGee** (17)	19,067	54–32
87	July 9	Nationals	5–3	**García** (1–2)	Clay (0–3)	**McGee** (18)	27,345	55–32
88	July 10	Nationals	10–4	**DeSclafani** (10–3)	Lester (2–4)	—	25,901	56–32
89	July 11	Nationals	3–1	**Gausman** (9–3)	Fedde (4–6)	**McGee** (19)	26,639	57–32
–	July 13	**91st All-Star Game in Denver, CO**						
90	July 16	@ Cardinals	7–2	**Jackson** (1–0)	Wainwright (7–6)	—	33,743	58–32
91	July 17	@ Cardinals	1–3	Kim (5–5)	**DeSclafani** (10–4)	Reyes (21)	40,489	58–33
92	July 18	@ Cardinals	1–2	Cabrera (2–3)	**Brebbia** (0–1)	Reyes (22)	29,425	58–34
93	July 19	@ Dodgers	7–2	**García** (2–2)	Gonsolin (1–1)	—	50,970	59–34
94	July 20	@ Dodgers	6–8	Sherfy (2–0)	**Rogers** (1–1)	—	42,344	59–35
95	July 21	@ Dodgers	4–2	**Álvarez** (3–1)	Jansen (1–3)	**Rogers** (11)	52,076	60–35
96	July 22	@ Dodgers	5–3	**Álvarez** (4–1)	Jansen (1–4)	**McGee** (20)	47,312	61–35
97	July 23	Pirates	4–6	Stratton (3–0)	**Leone** (2–1)	Rodríguez (14)	26,579	61–36
98	July 24	Pirates	2–10	Crowe (2–5)	**Gausman** (9–4)	—	30,780	61–37
99	July 25	Pirates	6–1	**Wood** (9–3)	Brubaker (4–10)	—	30,303	62–37
100	July 27	Dodgers	2–1	**Rogers** (2–1)	Treinen (2–5)	**McGee** (21)	32,878	63–37
101	July 28	Dodgers	0–8	Buehler (11–1)	**DeSclafani** (10–5)	—	33,728	63–38
102	July 29	Dodgers	5–0	**Cueto** (7–5)	Price (4–1)	—	35,136	64–38
103	July 30	Astros	6–9	Valdez (7–2)	**Gausman** (9–5)	—	28,020	64–39
104	July 31	Astros	8–6	**Jackson** (2–0)	Taylor (2–3)	**McGee** (22)	27,324	65–39

August: 19–9 (Home: 8–4; Away: 11–5)

#	Date	Opponent	Score	Win	Loss	Save	Attendance	Record
105	August 1	Astros	5–3	**Webb** (5–3)	García (7–6)	**McGee** (23)	29,655	66–39
106	August 2	@ Diamondbacks	11–8 (10)	**García** (3–2)	Aguilar (0–1)	—	8,904	67–39
107	August 3	@ Diamondbacks	1–3	Bumgarner (6–6)	**Cueto** (7–6)	Clippard (2)	8,809	67–40
108	August 4	@ Diamondbacks	7–1	**Gausman** (10–5)	Gallen (1–6)	—	8,091	68–40
109	August 5	@ Diamondbacks	5–4 (10)	**Rogers** (3–1)	Gilbert (0–1)	**McGee** (24)	8,773	69–40
110	August 6	@ Brewers	1–2 (10)	Suter (11–5)	**García** (3–3)	—	33,250	69–41
111	August 7	@ Brewers	9–6 (11)	**García** (4–3)	Romano (0–1)	—	34,155	70–41
112	August 8	@ Brewers	5–4	**Watson** (4–3)	Boxberger (4–3)	**Littell** (1)	38,597	71–41
113	August 10	Diamondbacks	8–7	**Littell** (1–0)	Peacock (5–7)	—	23,802	72–41
114	August 11	Diamondbacks	7–2	**Gausman** (11–5)	Kelly (7–9)	—	20,037	73–41
115	August 12	Rockies	7–0	**Webb** (6–3)	Márquez (10–9)	—	24,295	74–41
116	August 13	Rockies	5–4	**DeSclafani** (11–5)	Gomber (9–7)	**Littell** (2)	36,126	75–41
117	August 14	Rockies	1–4	Freeland (4–6)	**Leone** (2–2)	Bard (19)	32,282	75–42
118	August 15	Rockies	5–2	**Wood** (10–3)	Gray (7–9)	**McGee** (25)	33,337	76–42
119	August 16	Mets	7–5	**Gausman** (12–5)	Castro (3–4)	**McGee** (26)	23,511	77–42
120	August 17	Mets	3–2	**Webb** (7–3)	Stroman (8–12)	**Leone** (1)	23,610	78–42
121	August 18	Mets	2–6 (12)	Familia (7–3)	**Chatwood** (1–3)	—	25,360	78–43
122	August 20	@ Athletics	1–4	Kaprielian (7–4)	**Wood** (10–4)	Trivino (21)	40,133	78–44
123	August 21	@ Athletics	6–5	**Rogers** (4–1)	Trivino (5–5)	**McGee** (27)	36,230	79–44
124	August 22	@ Athletics	2–1	**Leone** (3–2)	Puk (0–1)	**McGee** (28)	30,345	80–44
125	August 24	@ Mets	8–0	**Long** (2–1)	Megill (1–3)	—	28,558	81–44
126	August 25	@ Mets	3–2	**Watson** (5–3)	Walker (7–9)	**McGee** (29)	24,384	82–44
127	August 26	@ Mets	3–2	**García** (5–3)	Lugo (3–2)	**Rogers** (12)	25,000	83–44
128	August 27	@ Braves	5–6	Minter (2–4)	**Watson** (5–4)	Smith (29)	35,586	83–45
129	August 28	@ Braves	5–0	**Webb** (8–3)	Ynoa (4–4)	—	39,558	84–45
130	August 29	@ Braves	0–9	Anderson (6–5)	**DeSclafani** (11–6)	—	28,820	84–46
131	August 30	Brewers	1–3	Burnes (9–4)	**Álvarez** (4–2)	Hader (28)	23,154	84–47
132	August 31	Brewers	2–6	Woodruff (9–7)	**Cueto** (7–7)	—	20,897	84–48

September: 21–6 (Home: 10–5; Away: 11–1)

#	Date	Opponent	Score	Win	Loss	Save	Attendance	Record
133	September 1	Brewers	2–5	Norris (2–3)	**Leone** (3–3)	Hader (29)	21,189	84–49
134	September 2	Brewers	5–1	**Rogers** (5–1)	Williams (7–2)	—	21,023	85–49
135	September 3	Dodgers	3–2 (11)	**García** (6–3)	Phillips (1–1)	—	39,338	86–49
136	September 4	Dodgers	1–6	Urías (16–3)	**Jackson** (2–1)	—	41,146	86–50
137	September 5	Dodgers	6–4	**Littell** (2–0)	Buehler (13–3)	—	41,155	87–50
138	September 6	@ Rockies	10–5	**Gausman** (13–5)	Freeland (5–7)	—	27,967	88–50
139	September 7	@ Rockies	12–3	**Webb** (9–3)	Gonzalez (3–7)	—	24,387	89–50
140	September 8	@ Rockies	7–4	**Rogers** (6–1)	Estévez (2–4)	**McGee** (30)	20,358	90–50
141	September 10	@ Cubs	6–1	**Doval** (2–1)	Megill (1–1)	—	29,439	91–50
142	September 11	@ Cubs	15–4	**Gausman** (14–5)	Davies (6–11)	**Baragar** (2)	34,723	92–50
143	September 12	@ Cubs	6–5	**Webb** (10–3)	Steele (3–3)	**McGee** (31)	32,021	93–50
144	September 13	Padres	9–1	**Littell** (3–0)	Darvish (8–10)	—	21,078	94–50
145	September 14	Padres	6–1	**DeSclafani** (12–6)	Arrieta (5–13)	—	23,192	95–50
146	September 15	Padres	6–9	Musgrove (11–9)	**Leone** (3–4)	—	21,212	95–51
147	September 16	Padres	4–7	Crismatt (3–1)	**Gausman** (14–6)	—	23,379	95–52
148	September 17	Braves	6–5 (11)	**Doval** (3–1)	Webb (4–3)	—	26,644	96–52
149	September 18	Braves	2–0	**Littell** (4–0)	Morton (13–6)	**Leone** (2)	32,058	97–52
150	September 19	Braves	0–3	Fried (12–7)	**DeSclafani** (12–7)	Smith (33)	32,210	97–53
151	September 21	@ Padres	6–5	**Watson** (6–4)	Melancon (4–3)	**Rogers** (13)	36,439	98–53
152	September 22	@ Padres	8–6	**Doval** (4–1)	Velasquez (3–8)	—	38,189	99–53
153	September 23	@ Padres	6–7 (10)	Detwiler (3–1)	**Leone** (3–5)	—	31,049	99–54
154	September 24	@ Rockies	7–2	**Castro** (1–0)	Goudeau (1–1)	—	41,613	100–54
155	September 25	@ Rockies	7–2	**Watson** (7–4)	Gray (8–12)	—	45,063	101–54
156	September 26	@ Rockies	6–2	**Doval** (5–1)	Bard (7–8)	—	31,043	102–54
157	September 28	Diamondbacks	6–4	**Álvarez** (5–2)	Poppen (1–1)	**Doval** (1)	28,122	103–54
158	September 29	Diamondbacks	1–0	**Leone** (4–5)	Ramirez (0–2)	**Doval** (2)	23,110	104–54
159	September 30	Diamondbacks	5–4	**Rogers** (7–1)	Mantiply (0–3)	—	27,503	105–54

October: 2–1 (Home: 2–1; Away: 0–0)

#	Date	Opponent	Score	Win	Loss	Save	Attendance	Record
160	October 1	Padres	3–0	**DeSclafani** (13–7)	Ávila (0–1)	**Doval** (3)	33,975	106–54
161	October 2	Padres	2–3 (10)	Hill (6–6)	**Castro** (1–1)	Melancon (39)	40,760	106–55
162	October 3	Padres	11–4	**Webb** (11–3)	Knehr (1–2)	—	36,901	107–55

== Postseason ==
=== Game log ===
2021 Postseason Game Log: 2–3 (Home: 1–2; Away: 1–1)
National League Division Series: 2–3 (Home: 1–2; Away: 1–1)

#	Date	Opponent	Score	Win	Loss	Save	Attendance	Record
1	October 8	Dodgers	4–0	Webb (1–0)	Buehler (0–1)	–	41,934	1–0
2	October 9	Dodgers	2–9	Urías (1–0)	Gausman (0–1)	–	42,275	1–1
3	October 11	@ Dodgers	1–0	Rogers (1–0)	Scherzer (0–1)	Doval (1)	53,299	2–1
4	October 12	@ Dodgers	2–7	Kelly (1–0)	DeSclafani (0–1)	–	52,935	2–2
5	October 14	Dodgers	1–2	Jansen (1–0)	Doval (0–1)	Scherzer (1)	42,275	2–3

=== Postseason rosters ===
Playoff rosters
National League Division Series

- Pitchers: 17 Jake McGee 26 Anthony DeSclafani 34 Kevin Gausman 46 Zack Littell 48 José Álvarez 52 Dominic Leone 57 Alex Wood 62 Logan Webb 66 Jarlin García 71 Tyler Rogers 75 Camilo Doval 76 Kervin Castro
- Catchers: 2 Curt Casali 28 Buster Posey
- Infielders: 7 Donovan Solano 10 Evan Longoria 18 Tommy La Stella 33 Darin Ruf 35 Brandon Crawford 41 Wilmer Flores
- Outfielders: 5 Mike Yastrzemski 6 Steven Duggar 12 Alex Dickerson 13 Austin Slater 23 Kris Bryant 31 LaMonte Wade Jr.

== Roster ==
2021 San Francisco Giants
Roster
Pitchers: 48 José Álvarez; 45 Caleb Baragar; 38 Tyler Beede; 59 John Brebbia; 76 Kervin Castro; 37 Tyler Chatwood; 47 Johnny Cueto; 26 Anthony DeSclafani; 75 Camilo Doval; 66 Jarlín García; 34 Kevin Gausman; 65 Jay Jackson; 16 Scott Kazmir; 52 Dominic Leone; 46,56 Zack Littell; 73 Sammy Long; 17 Jake McGee; 51 Conner Menez; 54 Reyes Moronta; 60 Wandy Peralta; 63 José Quintana; 71 Tyler Rogers; 21 Aaron Sanchez; 78 Gregory Santos; 67 Sam Selman; 64 Jimmie Sherfy; 63 Nick Tropeano; 56 Tony Watson; 62 Logan Webb; 37 Matt Wisler; 57 Alex Wood	Catchers: 60 Joey Bart; 2 Curt Casali; 28 Buster Posey; 14 Chadwick Tromp; Infielders: 9 Brandon Belt; 35 Brandon Crawford; 1 Mauricio Dubón; 39 Thairo Estrada; 41 Wilmer Flores; 18 Tommy La Stella; 10 Evan Longoria; 33 Darin Ruf; 7 Donovan Solano; 32 Jason Vosler	Outfielders: 65 Skye Bolt; 23 Kris Bryant; 49 Jaylin Davis; 12 Alex Dickerson; 6 Steven Duggar; 13 Austin Slater; 29 Mike Tauchman; 31 LaMonte Wade Jr.; 5 Mike Yastrzemski	Manager: 19 Gabe Kapler; Coaches: 0 Craig Albernaz (bullpen, catching); 84 Andrew Bailey (pitching); 97 Brian Bannister (pitching director); 50 Kai Correa (bench); 82 Donnie Ecker (hitting); 91 Mark Hallberg (special assistant); 90 J.P. Martinez (assistant pitching); 88 Dustin Lind (director of hitting); 92 Alyssa Nakken (special assistant); 79 Nick Ortiz (quality control); 00 Antoan Richardson (first base); 77 Justin Viele (hitting); 96 Brant Whiting (bullpen); 8 Ron Wotus (third base); 99 Taira Uematsu (bullpen catcher)

== Statistics ==
=== Batting ===
The list does not include pitchers. Stats in bold are the team leaders.

Note: G = Games played; AB = At bats; R = Runs; H = Hits; 2B = Doubles; 3B = Triples; HR = Home runs; RBI = Runs batted in; BB = Walks; SO = Strikeouts; SB = Stolen bases; AVG = Batting average; OBP = On-base percentage; SLG = Slugging percentage; OPS = On Base + Slugging

Player	G	AB	R	H	2B	3B	HR	RBI	BB	SO	SB	AVG	OBP	SLG	OPS
Brandon Crawford	138	**483**	**79**	**144**	**30**	3	24	**90**	**56**	105	11	**.298**	**.373**	**.522**	**.895**
Mike Yastrzemski	**139**	468	75	105	28	3	25	71	51	**131**	4	.224	.311	.457	.768
Buster Posey	113	395	68	120	23	0	18	56	**56**	87	0	.304	.390	.499	.889
Wilmer Flores	**139**	389	57	102	16	1	18	53	41	56	1	.262	.335	.447	.782
LaMonte Wade Jr.	109	336	52	85	17	3	18	56	33	89	6	.253	.326	.482	.808
Brandon Belt	97	325	65	89	14	2	**29**	59	48	103	3	.274	.378	.597	.975
Donovan Solano	101	307	35	86	17	0	7	31	25	58	2	.280	.344	.404	.748
Alex Dickerson	111	283	37	66	10	2	13	38	23	76	1	.233	.304	.420	.725
Austin Slater	129	274	39	66	12	1	12	32	28	84	**15**	.241	.320	.423	.744
Steven Duggar	107	268	45	69	14	**5**	8	35	27	88	7	.257	.330	.437	.766
Darin Ruf	117	262	41	71	13	2	16	43	46	87	2	.271	.385	.519	.904
Evan Longoria	81	253	45	66	17	0	13	46	35	68	1	.261	.351	.482	.833
Tommy La Stella	76	220	26	55	11	1	7	27	18	26	0	.250	.308	.405	.713
Curt Casali	77	200	20	42	11	1	5	26	26	66	0	.210	.313	.350	.663
Kris Bryant	51	187	28	49	13	0	7	22	23	46	6	.262	.344	.444	.788
Mauricio Dubón	74	175	20	42	9	0	5	22	9	41	2	.240	.278	.377	.655
Mike Tauchman	64	152	21	27	4	0	4	15	22	52	1	.178	.286	.283	.569
Thairo Estrada	52	121	19	33	4	0	7	22	9	23	1	.273	.333	.479	.813
Jason Vosler	41	73	12	13	4	0	3	9	7	21	2	.178	.256	.356	.612
Chadwick Tromp	9	18	1	4	0	0	1	2	0	4	0	.222	.222	.389	.611
Jaylin Davis	5	9	1	1	1	0	0	0	0	1	0	.111	.111	.222	.333
Joey Bart	2	6	1	2	0	0	0	1	0	2	0	.333	.333	.333	.667
Skye Bolt	2	1	0	0	0	0	0	0	0	1	0	.000	.000	.000	.000
Non-Pitcher Totals	162	5205	787	1337	268	24	240	756	583	1315	65	.257	.337	.456	.793
**Team totals**	**162**	**5462**	**804**	**1360**	**271**	**25**	**241**	**768**	**602**	**1461**	**66**	**.249**	**.329**	**.440**	**.769**

=== Pitching ===
The list does not include position players. Stats in bold are the team leaders.

Note: W = Wins; L = Losses; ERA = Earned run average; G = Games pitched; GS = Games started; SV = Saves; IP = Innings pitched; H = Hits allowed; R = Runs allowed; ER = Earned runs allowed; BB = Walks allowed; K = Strikeouts

Player	W	L	ERA	G	GS	SV	IP	H	R	ER	BB	K
Kevin Gausman	**14**	6	**2.81**	33	**33**	0	**192.0**	**150**	**66**	**60**	**50**	**227**
Anthony DeSclafani	13	**7**	3.17	31	31	0	167.2	141	61	59	42	152
Logan Webb	11	3	3.03	27	26	0	148.1	128	53	50	36	158
Alex Wood	10	4	3.83	26	26	0	138.2	125	63	59	39	152
Johnny Cueto	7	**7**	4.08	22	21	0	114.2	127	57	52	30	98
Tyler Rogers	7	1	2.22	**80**	0	13	81.0	74	23	20	13	55
Jarlin García	6	3	2.62	58	0	1	68.2	48	26	20	18	68
José Álvarez	5	2	2.37	67	1	0	64.2	53	23	17	19	42
Zack Littell	4	0	2.92	63	2	2	61.2	46	24	20	24	63
Jake McGee	3	2	2.72	62	0	**31**	59.2	44	25	18	10	58
Dominic Leone	4	5	1.51	57	4	2	53.2	37	15	9	22	50
Sammy Long	2	1	5.53	12	5	0	40.2	37	27	25	15	38
Aaron Sanchez	1	1	3.06	9	7	0	35.1	32	12	12	15	26
Camilo Doval	5	1	3.00	29	0	3	27.0	19	10	9	9	37
Tony Watson	4	1	2.96	26	0	0	24.1	15	8	8	4	19
Caleb Baragar	2	1	1.57	25	0	2	23.0	19	7	4	12	16
Jay Jackson	2	1	3.74	23	1	0	21.2	15	9	9	12	28
Matt Wisler	1	2	6.05	21	0	0	19.1	19	13	13	6	26
John Brebbia	0	1	5.89	18	0	0	18.1	25	13	12	4	22
Conner Menez	1	0	3.86	8	1	0	14.0	16	10	6	3	15
Kervin Castro	1	1	0.00	10	0	0	13.1	13	1	0	4	13
Scott Kazmir	0	1	6.35	5	4	0	11.1	15	9	8	6	10
Jimmie Sherfy	1	0	4.22	10	0	0	10.2	9	5	5	4	9
José Quintana	0	0	4.66	5	0	0	9.2	8	5	5	6	12
Wandy Peralta	2	1	5.40	10	0	2	8.1	11	5	5	3	8
Sam Selman	0	0	4.50	7	0	0	8.0	4	4	4	4	8
Nick Tropeano	1	0	1.50	4	0	0	6.0	4	2	1	2	2
Tyler Chatwood	0	1	6.75	2	0	0	4.0	6	5	3	1	6
Reyes Moronta	0	0	2.25	4	0	0	4.0	1	1	1	0	2
Gregory Santos	0	2	22.50	3	0	0	2.0	5	6	5	2	3
Tyler Beede	0	0	27.00	1	0	0	1.0	2	3	3	0	2
**Team totals**	**107**	**55**	**3.24**	**162**	**162**	**56**	**1455.0**	**1254**	**594**	**524**	**416**	**1425**

== Farm system ==
Level	Team	League	Division	Manager	Record Type	Record
AAA	Sacramento River Cats	Triple-A West	West	Dave Brundage	Regular; Final Stretch	52–65 (.444); 4–6 (.400)
AA	Richmond Flying Squirrels	Double-A Northeast	Southwest	José Alguacil	Regular	57–56 (.504)
High-A	Eugene Emeralds	High-A West	N/A	Dennis Pelfrey	Regular	69–50 (.580)
Low-A	San Jose Giants	Low-A West	North	Lenn Sakata	Regular	76–44 (.633)
Rookie	ACL Giants Black	Arizona Complex League	East	Carlos Valderrama	Regular	28–31 (.475)
Rookie	ACL Giants Orange	Arizona Complex League	East	Lance Burkhart	Regular	35–24 (.593)
Rookie	DSL Giants Black	Dominican Summer League	San Pedro	Jose Montilla	Regular	24–28 (.462)
Rookie	DSL Giants Orange	Dominican Summer League	Northeast	Juan Ciriaco	Regular	27–27 (.500)
