= Jhonatan Solano =

Colombian baseball player (born 1985)

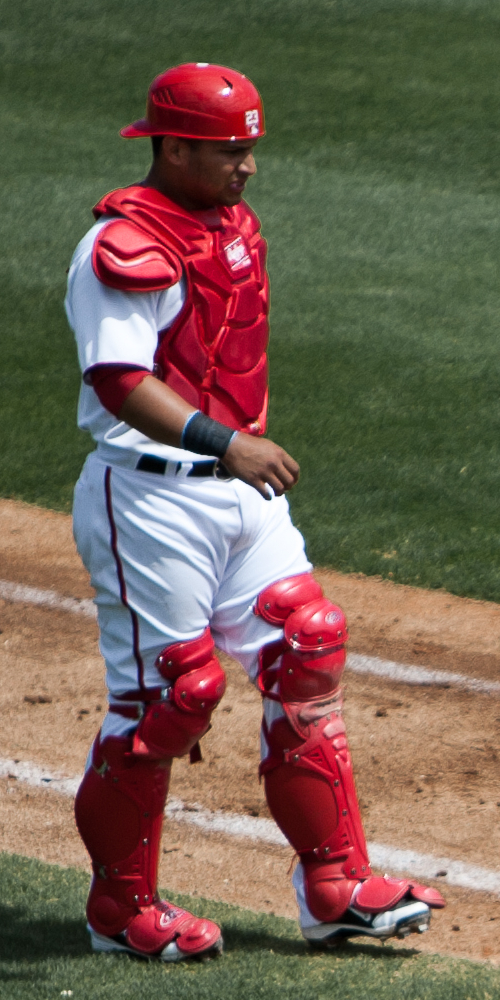
- Solano playing for the Washington Nationals

Arizona Diamondbacks – No. 84
- Catcher / Manager
- Born: August 12, 1985 (age 41); Barranquilla, Colombia
- Batted: Right Threw: Right

MLB debut
- May 29, 2012, for the Washington Nationals

Last appearance
- May 31, 2015, for the Miami Marlins

MLB statistics
- Batting average: .184
- Home runs: 2
- Runs batted in: 10
- Stats at Baseball Reference

Teams
- Washington Nationals (2012–2013); Miami Marlins (2015)

Jhonatan Solano (born August 12, 1985) is a Colombian former professional baseball catcher. He played in Major League Baseball (MLB) for the Washington Nationals and Miami Marlins, making his MLB debut in 2012.

== Professional career ==
=== Washington Nationals ===
Solano signed with the Washington Nationals as an international free agent in 2006. He spent the next six seasons working his way up the Nationals' farm system. After spending the 2011 season with the Syracuse Chiefs, the Nationals added Solano to their 40-man roster after the season to protect him from the Rule 5 draft.

On May 29, 2012, Solano was called up to the majors by the Nationals after Wilson Ramos tore his ACL and could miss the rest of the 2012 season. On that same day, Solano got his first major league hit, a double, on his first at bat, against his brother Donovan's team, the Miami Marlins. About two weeks later, on June 12, he hit the first home run of his major league career against the Toronto Blue Jays On July 19, the Nationals placed Solano on the 15-day disabled list with an oblique injury.

The Nationals recalled Solano from the Triple-A Syracuse Chiefs on May 16, 2013, when Ramos went on the disabled list.

Solano was released by the Washington Nationals on November 18, 2014.

=== Miami Marlins ===
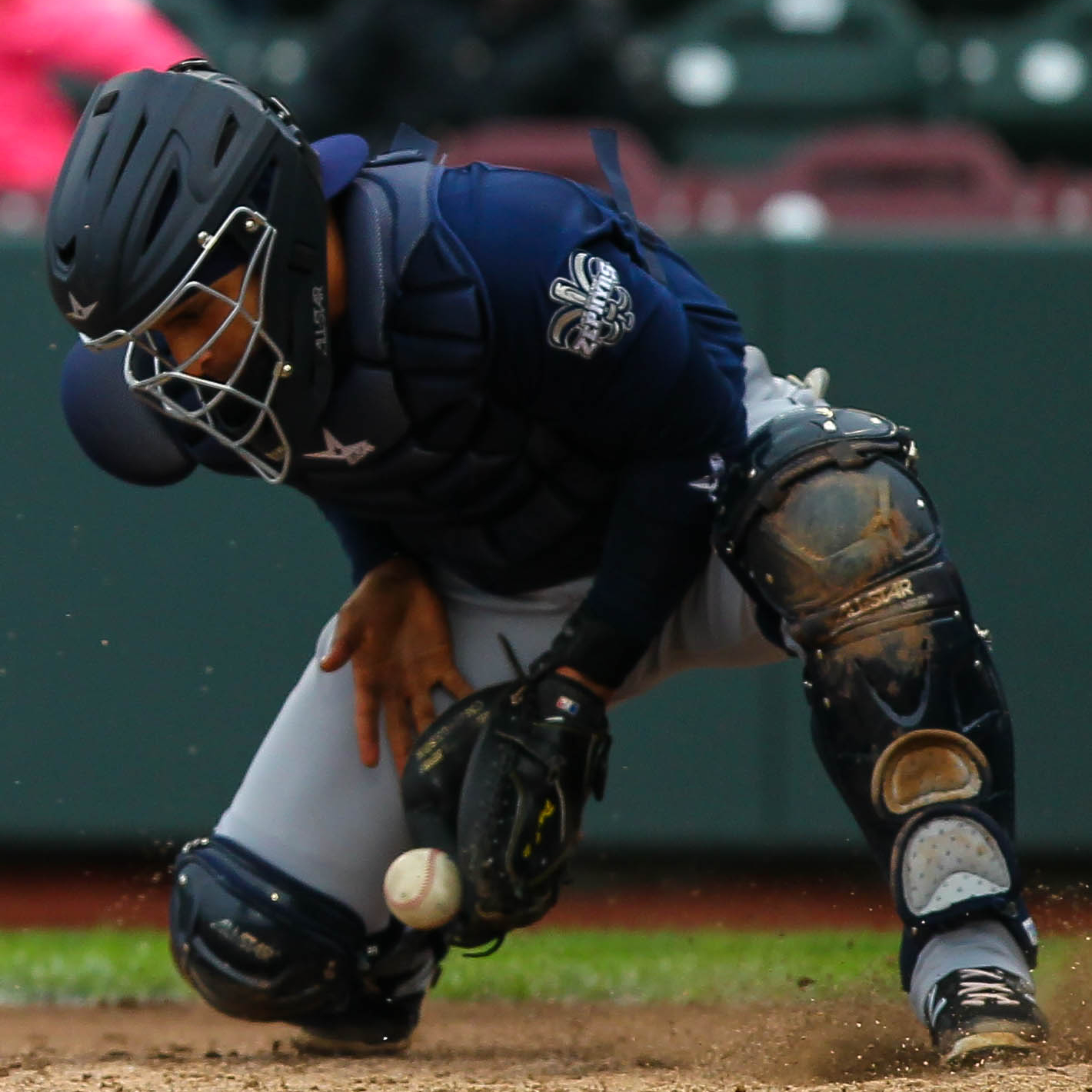
Solano with the New Orleans Zephyrs

On December 9, 2014, Solano signed a minor league contract with the Miami Marlins. He was designated for assignment on June 5, 2015. He was called back up by the Marlins on June 18 and designated for assignment again two days later.

=== Washington Nationals (second stint) ===
On December 22, 2015, Solano signed a minor league contract with the Nationals. Catching for the Triple–A Syracuse Chiefs, Solano set a new club record for number of games caught for the Syracuse team.

Solano had his contract purchased on April 7, 2018, but was assigned to the disabled list with bone chips in his elbow days later without appearing in a game. He became a free agent after the 2018 season.

=== St. Paul Saints ===
On July 3, 2019, Solano signed with the St. Paul Saints of the American Association of Independent Professional Baseball. He was released on August 10. In 13 games he hit .213/.245/.255 with 0 home runs and 3 RBIs.

Solano retired before the 2020 season.

== International career ==
He was a member of Team Colombia in the 2017 World Baseball Classic (WBC), along with his brother Donovan Solano. Solano went 2 for 8, but Colombia was eliminated in the first round.

Solano was the bench coach for the Colombian national team at the 2023 WBC and 2026 WBC qualification tournament.

== Post-playing career ==
Solano is a bullpen catcher for the Arizona Diamondbacks.

In 2024, Solano became the manager the Tigres de Cartagena club of the Colombian Professional Baseball League.

== Personal ==
Solano's brother, Donovan Solano, won a Silver Slugger Award in 2020 and plays for the Texas Rangers. The Solanos were the first brothers to make their MLB debut in the same month since Vladimir Guerrero and Wilton Guerrero in September 1996, and the first brothers to have their first MLB hit in the same month since Pete Stanicek and Steve Stanicek in September 1987. The brothers played together for the Marlins in 2015 and for Colombia in the 2017 World Baseball Classic.

Solano's parents are Luis Solano and Myriam Preciado. Luis pitched and played infield in Colombian baseball leagues.

Solano attended high school at Colegio Americano de Barranquilla in Barranquilla, Colombia.
