= Donovan Solano =

Colombian baseball player (born 1987)

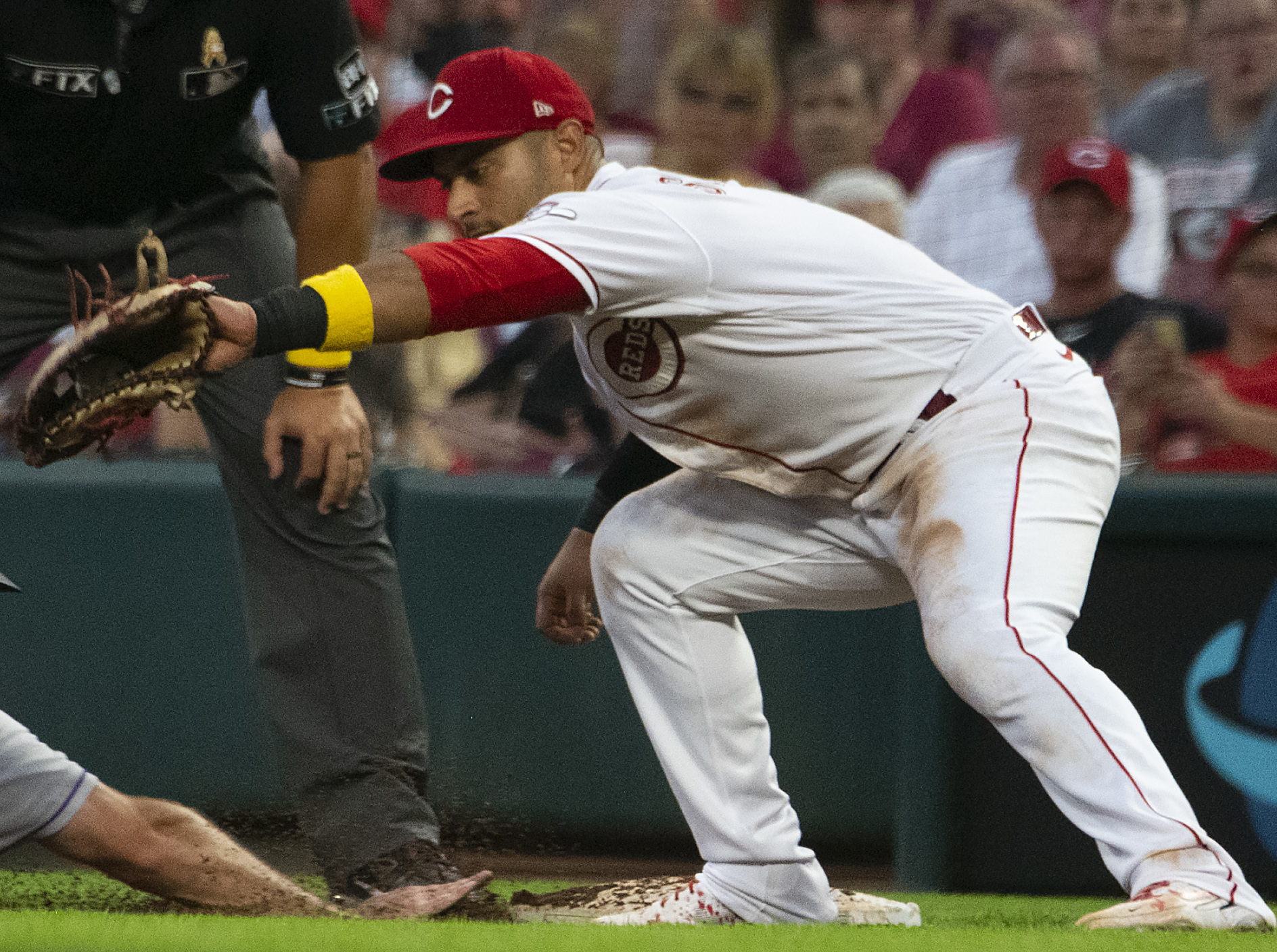
- Solano with the Cincinnati Reds in 2022

Free agent
- Infielder
- Born: December 17, 1987 (age 38); Barranquilla, Colombia
- Bats: Right Throws: Right

MLB debut
- May 21, 2012, for the Miami Marlins

MLB statistics (through 2025 season)
- Batting average: .277
- Home runs: 43
- Runs batted in: 300
- Stats at Baseball Reference

Teams
- Miami Marlins (2012–2015); New York Yankees (2016); San Francisco Giants (2019–2021); Cincinnati Reds (2022); Minnesota Twins (2023); San Diego Padres (2024); Seattle Mariners (2025); Texas Rangers (2025)

Career highlights and awards
- Silver Slugger Award (2020)

Donovan Solano Preciado, nicknamed "Donnie Barrels", (born December 17, 1987) is a Colombian professional baseball infielder who is a free agent. He has previously played in Major League Baseball (MLB) for the Miami Marlins, New York Yankees, San Francisco Giants, Cincinnati Reds, Minnesota Twins, San Diego Padres, Seattle Mariners, and Texas Rangers.

Solano won the Silver Slugger Award in 2020. He has played for Colombia in several World Baseball Classic tournaments.

== Early life ==
Solano was born and raised in Barranquilla, Colombia. He grew up playing baseball with his older brother, Jhonatan Solano.

== Professional career ==
=== St. Louis Cardinals ===
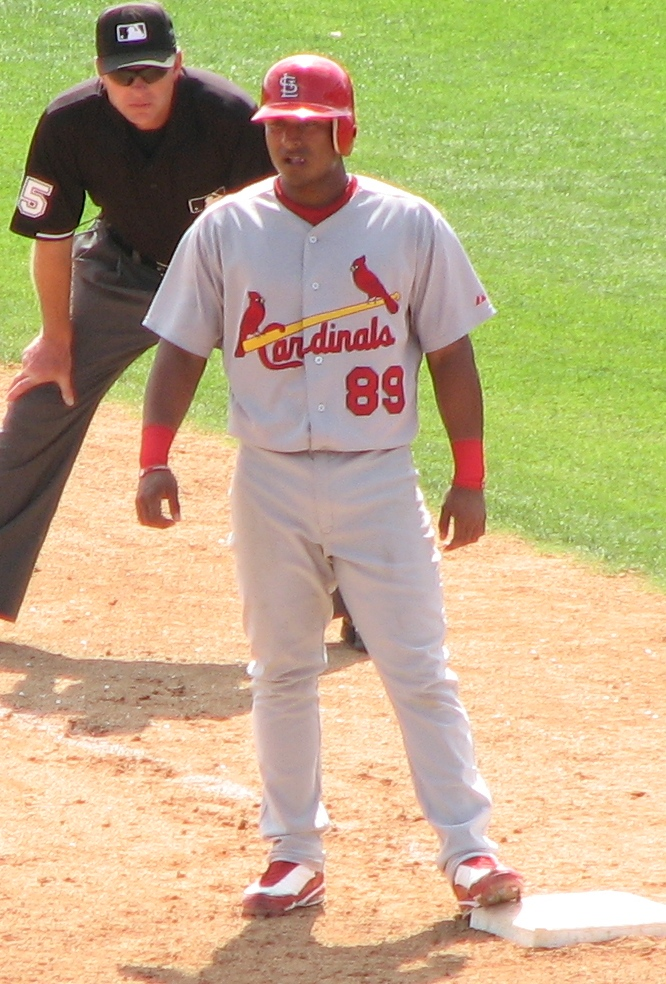
Solano with the St. Louis Cardinals in 2010 spring training

Solano signed as an international free agent with the St. Louis Cardinals in January 2005 after performing well at a workout attended by then-Cardinals scouting director Jeff Luhnow. In 2008, Solano was a mid-season Florida State League All Star with the High-A Palm Beach Cardinals. He spent seven seasons in the Cardinals organization as a backup infielder but never made it to the major leagues with them. He advanced as high as Triple-A, playing for the Memphis Redbirds in 2009, 2010, and 2011. He became a free agent on November 2, 2011.

=== Miami Marlins ===
Solano signed a minor league contract with the Miami Marlins on November 11, 2011, and was a non-roster invitee to 2012 spring training. Solano competed for a reserve infielder role with the Marlins, ultimately won by Donnie Murphy. Solano was assigned to the Triple-A New Orleans Zephyrs. He received his first promotion to MLB by the Marlins on May 20, becoming the 12th Colombian-born player to reach the major leagues. On May 22, he singled in his first career at-bat, a pinch-hit single in the 7th inning. Solano started his first MLB game on May 26. He went 2-for-4 against the San Francisco Giants with two hits and a run batted in (RBI).

After the Marlins traded away infielders Hanley Ramírez and Omar Infante, in July, Solano competed with Murphy and Greg Dobbs for playing time at third base, as Emilio Bonifacio took over second base . After Bonifacio injured his knee, Solano took over second while Murphy, Dobbs, and Gil Velazquez competed to be the starting third baseman. Solano finished the season batting .295/.342/.375 in 285 at bats with two home runs, 11 doubles, 3 triples, 28 RBIs, and 7 stolen bases. He was named the second baseman on the Baseball America All-Rookie Team.

The Marlins placed Solano on the disabled list on May 7, 2013, retroactive to May 4, with a strained left intercostal muscle. He returned and played in 102 games, batting .249/.305/.316. He was named the Marlins' Defensive Player of the Year by Wilson after playing primarily second base.

In 2014, he appeared in 111 games for the Marlins, batting .252/.300/.323. In 2015, his last year with Miami, he appeared in only 55 games, splitting time between shortstop, third base, and second base, with a dismal .189 batting average. He became a free agent on October 17.

=== New York Yankees ===
On January 9, 2016, the New York Yankees signed Solano to a minor league contract. He spent the 2016 season with the Triple-A Scranton/Wilkes-Barre RailRiders, with whom he was a postseason All-Star after batting .319 (eighth in the International League)/.349/.436 with 33 doubles (tied for third in the league), 7 home runs, 7 sacrifice flies (leading the league), and 67 RBI (tied for fourth) in 546 plate appearances. The Yankees promoted him on September 18, following an injury to Starlin Castro. In 23 plate appearances, he hit .227/.261/.455. The Yankees outrighted him to Scranton/Wilkes-Barre after the regular season.

Solano spent the 2017 season with Scranton/Wilkes-Barre, hitting .282/.329/.391 with 44 runs, 29 doubles (tied for 9th in the league), four home runs, and 48 RBI in 405 plate appearances. He batted .330 with runners in scoring position. He became a free agent on November 6. Following the season, he played for Tigres del Licey of the Dominican Winter League, hitting .371/.400/.468 in 62 at bats.

=== Los Angeles Dodgers ===
On January 19, 2018, Solano signed a minor league contract with the Los Angeles Dodgers. He played in 81 games for the Triple-A Oklahoma City Dodgers of the Pacific Coast League, batting .318./.353/.430 in 340 plate appearances. A hamstring injury cost him playing time. Solano became a free agent following the season on November 2.

=== San Francisco Giants ===
On December 18, 2018, Solano signed a minor league contract with the San Francisco Giants. He started the 2019 season with the Triple-A Sacramento River Cats, batting .322/.392/.437 with two home runs and 16 RBIs in 24 games. The Giants selected his contract on May 7, his first time in MLB since the end of the 2016 season. With the Giants in 2019, he batted .330/.360/.456 with 27 runs, four home runs, and 23 RBIs in 215 at-bats. He hit line drives on 33.9 percent of batted balls, the highest of any MLB batter with at least 60 plate appearances. He also hit .402 on the road, the first time a batter topped .400 since Ichiro Suzuki in 2004. He played primarily second base, getting regular appearances as a pinch hitter and shortstop, with a few games at third base and designated hitter. On December 2, he and the Giants agreed to a one-year, $1.375 million contract, avoiding arbitration.

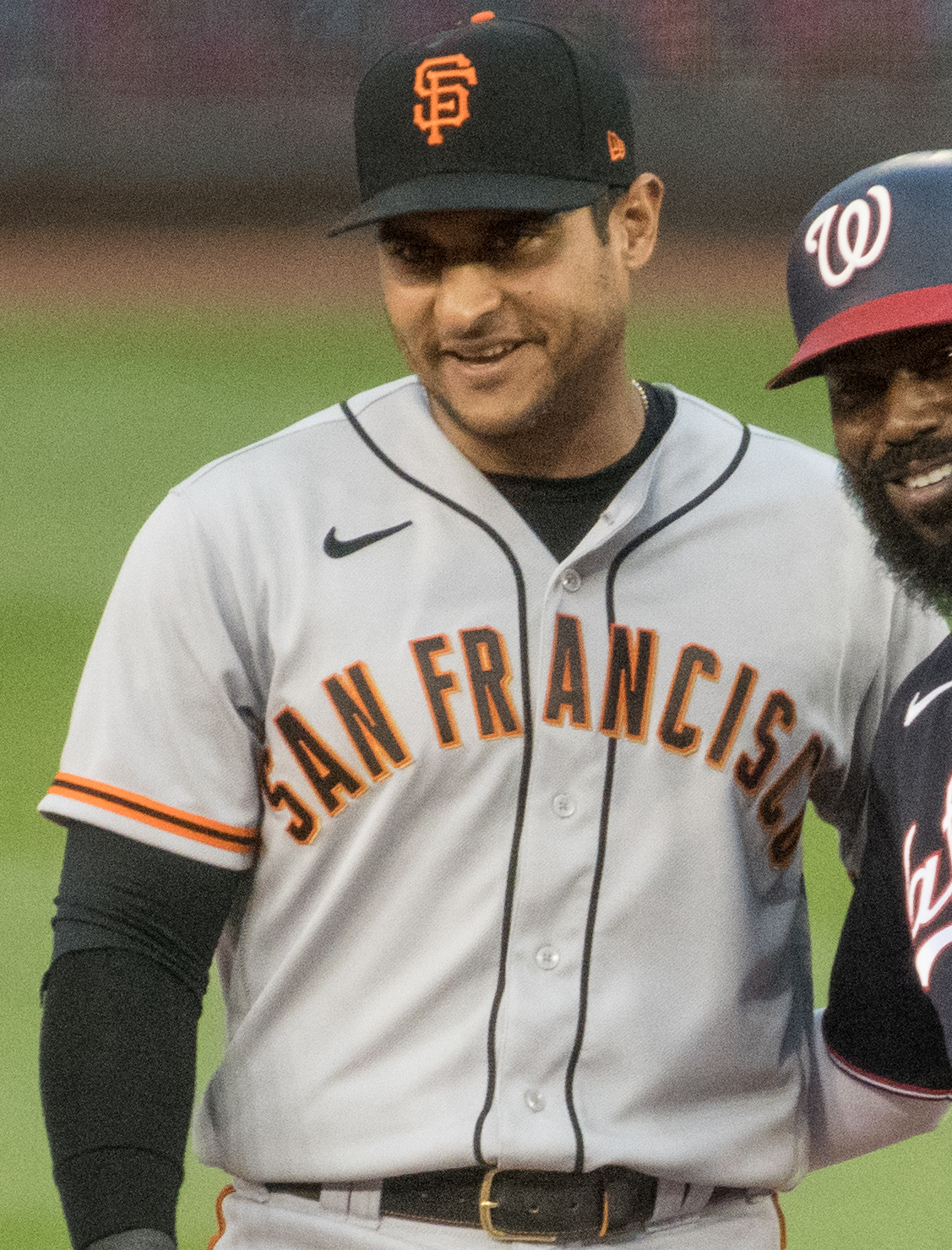
Solano with the San Francisco Giants in 2021

Solano had a breakout year in the shortened 2020 season. After making an out in his only at bat on Opening Day, he had a career-high 17-game hitting streak, batting .439 from July 25 to August 15. On September 1, Solano had a career-high 6 RBIs in a 23–5 blowout win over the Colorado Rockies. He ended the 2020 season batting a career-high .326 (5th in the NL)/.365/.463, with a career-high 15 doubles (fourth), three home runs, 29 RBIs, and three sacrifice flies (seventh) in 54 games in the 60-game season. However, his 11 errors were the second-most in baseball, behind Rafael Devers. He won the Silver Slugger Award for National League second basemen. He also won a sportsman of the year award from Colombian journalists.

Solano signed a $3.25 million contract on February 18, 2021. In the 2021 regular season, Solano batted .280/.344/.404 with 35 runs, seven home runs, and 31 RBIs in 344 plate appearances. He made his MLB postseason debut but was hitless in 9 plate appearances with 1 sacrifice fly and 1 RBI. He became a free agent on November 3.

=== Cincinnati Reds ===
On March 16, 2022, Solano signed a one-year, $4.5 million contract with the Cincinnati Reds. He started the season on the injured list and received a platelet-rich plasma injection to address lingering pain in his left hamstring in April. He was placed on the 60-day injured list on May 23. He made his first appearance for the Reds on June 22. Solano appeared in 80 games for Cincinnati, slashing .284/.339/.385 with 4 home runs and 24 RBI.

=== Minnesota Twins ===
Solano signed a one-year, $2 million contract with the Minnesota Twins on February 23, 2023. In 134 games for Minnesota, he batted .282/.369/.391 with five home runs and a career-high 38 RBI as the Twins won American League Central. In his return to the postseason, he batted 1-for-10 with 3 walks. Solano became a free agent on November 2.

=== San Diego Padres ===
On April 15, 2024, Solano signed a minor league contract with the San Diego Padres. In 12 games for the Triple-A El Paso Chihuahuas, he hit .318/.392/.455 with 1 home run and 8 RBI. On May 5, the Padres added Solano to their major league roster. Solano started his time with the Padres primarily playing third base with Manny Machado limited due to his recovery from an elbow surgery at the end of the previous season. He played first base on September 25 as the Padres clinched a postseason berth with a triple play against the Dodgers, making the game's final putout. Solano hit a career high 8 home runs in the regular season, batting .286/.343/.417 in 96 games as the Padres advanced to the National League Division Series before their elimination by the Dodgers. Solano again struggled in the playoffs, batting 1-for-14. He returned to free agency on October 31.

=== Seattle Mariners ===
On January 13, 2025, Solano signed a one-year, $3.5 million contract with the Seattle Mariners. He hit two home runs at Wrigley Field on June 22. In 69 games for Seattle, he batted .252/.295/.344 with three home runs and 21 RBI. The Mariners released him on September 1.

=== Texas Rangers ===
On September 9, 2025, Solano signed a minor league contract with the Texas Rangers. In 10 games for the Triple-A Round Rock Express, he hit .212/.308/.303 with two RBI. On September 26, the Rangers selected Solano's contract, adding him to their active roster. He played in two games for Texas, batting 0-for-3.

== International career ==
Solano played for the Colombia national baseball team in the 2013 World Baseball Classic (WBC) qualifiers. He batted .385/.467/.615, leading the team with 5 hits and 3 RBI. However, Colombia did not move on from the qualifiers that year, after losing to Brazil and Panama.

After Colombia qualified for the 2017 WBC, Solano played for the national team alongside his brother Jhonatan. Solano batted 3-for-14, with a .214/.267/.214 slash line as Colombia was eliminated in the first round.

Solano initially committed to play in the 2023 WBC but withdrew from the team the month before the tournament to prepare for his upcoming season with the Twins.

Solano played in the 2026 WBC, batting 1-for-10 and tied for the tournament lead with 7 walks as Colombia again did not advance past the first round.

== Personal life ==
Solano's older brother, Jhonatan Solano, was a catcher who made his debut in May 2012 for the Washington Nationals against Solano's Marlins. The Solanos were the first brothers to make their MLB debut in the same month since Vladimir Guerrero and Wilton Guerrero in September 1996, and the first brothers to have their first MLB hit in the same month since Pete Stanicek and Steve Stanicek in September 1987. The brothers played together for the Marlins in 2015 and for Colombia in the 2017 World Baseball Classic. Their father pitched and played infield in Colombian baseball leagues.

Solano and his wife have three sons. He is a Christian.

== See also ==
- List of Major League Baseball players from Colombia
