= Orlando Ramírez =

Colombian baseball player (born 1951)

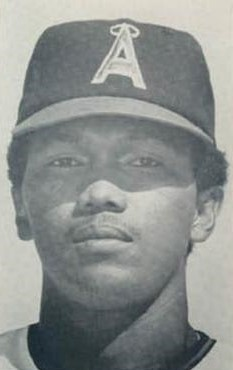
- Shortstop
- Born: December 18, 1951 (age 73); Cartagena, Colombia
- Batted: Right Threw: Right

MLB debut
- July 6, 1974, for the California Angels

Last MLB appearance
- May 16, 1979, for the California Angels

MLB statistics
- Batting average: .189
- Home runs: 0
- Runs batted in: 16
- Stats at Baseball Reference

Teams
- California Angels (1974–1977, 1979)
Medals
Representing Colombia
Bolivarian Games
Gold medal – first place	1973 Panama City	Team
Baseball World Cup
Silver medal – second place	1971 Havana	Team
Pan American Games
Bronze medal – third place	1971 Cali	Team

Orlando Ramírez Leal (born December 18, 1951), nicknamed as "El Ñato" (Snub Nose), is a Colombian former Major League Baseball shortstop who played for the California Angels between 1974 and 1979. He was the first recognized Colombian-born player in major league history, following Luis Castro, who played 42 games for the Philadelphia Athletics in the 1902 season.

In his 143-game major league career, Ramírez batted .189 with 16 RBI, 24 runs, five doubles, one triple and 16 stolen bases. On the international stage, he led the Colombian national team at the Baseball World Cup and Pan American Games.

== Professional career ==
Ramírez began his career with the Willard club from Barranquilla, Colombia in 1966 which was recognized as the top level of Colombian baseball.

Ramírez first played for the Shreveport Captains in the Texas League, the Double-A affiliate of the California Angels. He excelled and was transferred to the Idaho Falls Angels in the Pioneer Rookie League. From Idaho Falls, he was sent to the minors in 1973, playing for the Quad Cities Angels where he soon played Double-A again in 1974. A short time after playing Double-A, Ramírez was promoted to the majors.

== International career ==
At the age of 17, Ramírez made the Colombian national team and debuted in his first game in the 1969 Amateur World Series held in Santo Domingo. He batted third and played third base on the Colombian national team. In the 1970 and 1971 Amateur World Series, Ramírez played shortstop and led all players in stolen bases. He led the Colombian national team to a silver medal in the 1971 tournament, held in Havana. He also won a bronze medal at the 1971 Pan American Games.

== Colombian significance ==
Ramírez was inducted in the Colombian Baseball Hall of Fame in September 2009. He was the first Colombian to play in the Major Leagues. The Colombian Professional Baseball League Most Valuable Player award has been in his name since the winter of 2005-06.

== See also ==
- Players from Colombia in MLB
