= List of Major League Baseball players from Colombia =

This is a list of baseball players from Colombia who have played in Major League Baseball. Lou Castro was the first player from Colombia to make it into the Major Leagues, but it would be over seventy years before another made it. In Bold denotes still active players in the league.

== Players ==
Name	Debut	Final game	Position	Teams	Ref
Lou Castro	April 23, 1902	September 27, 1902	Infielder/Outfielder	Philadelphia Athletics (1902)	
Orlando Ramírez	July 6, 1974	May 16, 1979	Infielder	California Angels (1974–1977, 1979)	
Jackie Gutiérrez	September 6, 1983	October 1, 1988	Infielder	Boston Red Sox (1983–1985); Baltimore Orioles (1986–1987); Philadelphia Phillies (1988)	
Édgar Rentería	May 10, 1996	September 28, 2011	Infielder	Florida Marlins (1996–1998); St. Louis Cardinals (1999–2004); Boston Red Sox (2005); Atlanta Braves (2006–2007); Detroit Tigers (2008); San Francisco Giants (2009–2010); Cincinnati Reds (2011)	
Orlando Cabrera	September 3, 1997	September 23, 2011	Infielder	Montreal Expos (1997–2004); Boston Red Sox (2004); Los Angeles Angels of Anaheim (2005–2007); Chicago White Sox (2008); Oakland Athletics (2009); Minnesota Twins (2009); Cincinnati Reds (2010); Cleveland Indians (2011); San Francisco Giants (2011)	
Jolbert Cabrera	April 12, 1998	September 28, 2008	Infielder/Outfielder	Cleveland Indians (1998–2002); Los Angeles Dodgers (2002–2003); Seattle Mariners (2004); Cincinnati Reds (2008)	
Yamid Haad	July 5, 1999	October 1, 2005	Catcher	Pittsburgh Pirates (1999); San Francisco Giants (2005)	
Emiliano Fruto	May 14, 2006	September 29, 2006	Pitcher	Seattle Mariners (2006)	
Ernesto Frieri	September 26, 2009	July 3, 2017	Pitcher	San Diego Padres (2009–2012); Los Angeles Angels of Anaheim (2012–2014); Pittsburgh Pirates (2014); Tampa Bay Rays (2015); Texas Rangers (2017)	
Julio Teherán	May 7, 2011		Pitcher	Atlanta Braves (2011–2019); Los Angeles Angels (2020); Detroit Tigers (2021); Milwaukee Brewers (2023); New York Mets (2024)	
**José Quintana**	May 7, 2012		Pitcher	Chicago White Sox (2012–2017); Chicago Cubs (2017–2020); Los Angeles Angels (2021); San Francisco Giants (2021); Pittsburgh Pirates (2022); St. Louis Cardinals (2022); New York Mets (2023–2024); Milwaukee Brewers (2025–present)	
**Donovan Solano**	May 21, 2012		Infielder/Outfielder	Miami Marlins (2012–2015); New York Yankees (2016); San Francisco Giants (2019); Cincinnati Reds (2022); Minnesota Twins (2023); San Diego Padres (2024–present)	
Jhonatan Solano	May 29, 2012	May 31, 2015	Catcher	Washington Nationals (2012–2013); Miami Marlins (2015)	
Dilson Herrera	August 29, 2014		Infielder	New York Mets (2014–2015); Cincinnati Reds (2018)	
Sugar Ray Marimón	April 14, 2015	September 25, 2015	Pitcher	Atlanta Braves (2015)	
Giovanny Urshela	June 9, 2015		Infielder	Cleveland Indians (2015, 2017); Toronto Blue Jays (2018); New York Yankees (2019–2021); Minnesota Twins (2022); Los Angeles Angels (2023); Detroit Tigers (2024); Atlanta Braves (2024–present)	
Yhonathan Barrios	September 24, 2015	October 4, 2015	Pitcher	Milwaukee Brewers (2015)	
**Tyron Guerrero**	May 17, 2016		Pitcher	San Diego Padres (2016); Miami Marlins (2018–2019); Boston Red Sox (2026)	
Dayán Díaz	May 22, 2016	July 6, 2017	Pitcher	Cincinnati Reds (2016); Los Angeles Angels (2017)	
Jorge Alfaro	September 12, 2016		Catcher	Philadelphia Phillies (2016–2018); Miami Marlins (2019–2021); San Diego Padres (2022); Colorado Rockies (2023); Boston Red Sox (2023)	
Meibrys Viloria	September 2, 2018		Catcher	Kansas City Royals (2018–2020)	
**Harold Ramírez**	May 11, 2019		Outfielder	Miami Marlins (2019–2020); Cleveland Indians (2021); Tampa Bay Rays (2022–2024); Washington Nationals (2024)	
Oscar Mercado	May 14, 2019		Outfielder	Cleveland Indians / Guardians (2019-2022); Philadelphia Phillies (2022); Cleveland Guardians (2022); St. Louis Cardinals (2023)	
Luis Escobar	Jul 7, 2019		Pitcher	Pittsburgh Pirates (2019)	
**Luis Patiño**	Aug 5, 2020		Pitcher	San Diego Padres (2020); Tampa Bay Rays (2021–2023); Chicago White Sox (2023)	
**Nabil Crismatt**	Aug 17, 2020		Pitcher	St. Louis Cardinals (2020); San Diego Padres (2021–present)	
Jhon Romero	September 24, 2021		Pitcher	Washington Nationals (2021); Minnesota Twins (2022)	
**Reiver Sanmartin**	September 27, 2021		Pitcher	Cincinnati Reds (2021–present)	
Jeter Downs	June 22, 2022		Infielder	Boston Red Sox (2022); Washington Nationals (2023)	
**Jordan Díaz**	September 18, 2022		Infielder	Oakland Athletics (2022–2023)	
**Guillermo Zuñiga**	May 2, 2023		Pitcher	St. Louis Cardinals (2023); Los Angeles Angels (2024–present)	
**Jaír Camargo**	April 16, 2024		Catcher	Minnesota Twins (2024)	
**Gustavo Campero**	September 15, 2024		Infielder	Los Angeles Angels (2024–present)	
**Didier Fuentes**	June 20, 2025		Pitcher	Atlanta Braves (2025–present)	
**Michael Arroyo**	September 6, 2026		Infielder	Seattle Mariners (2026–present)	
