= Jon Asamoah =

American football player (born 1988)

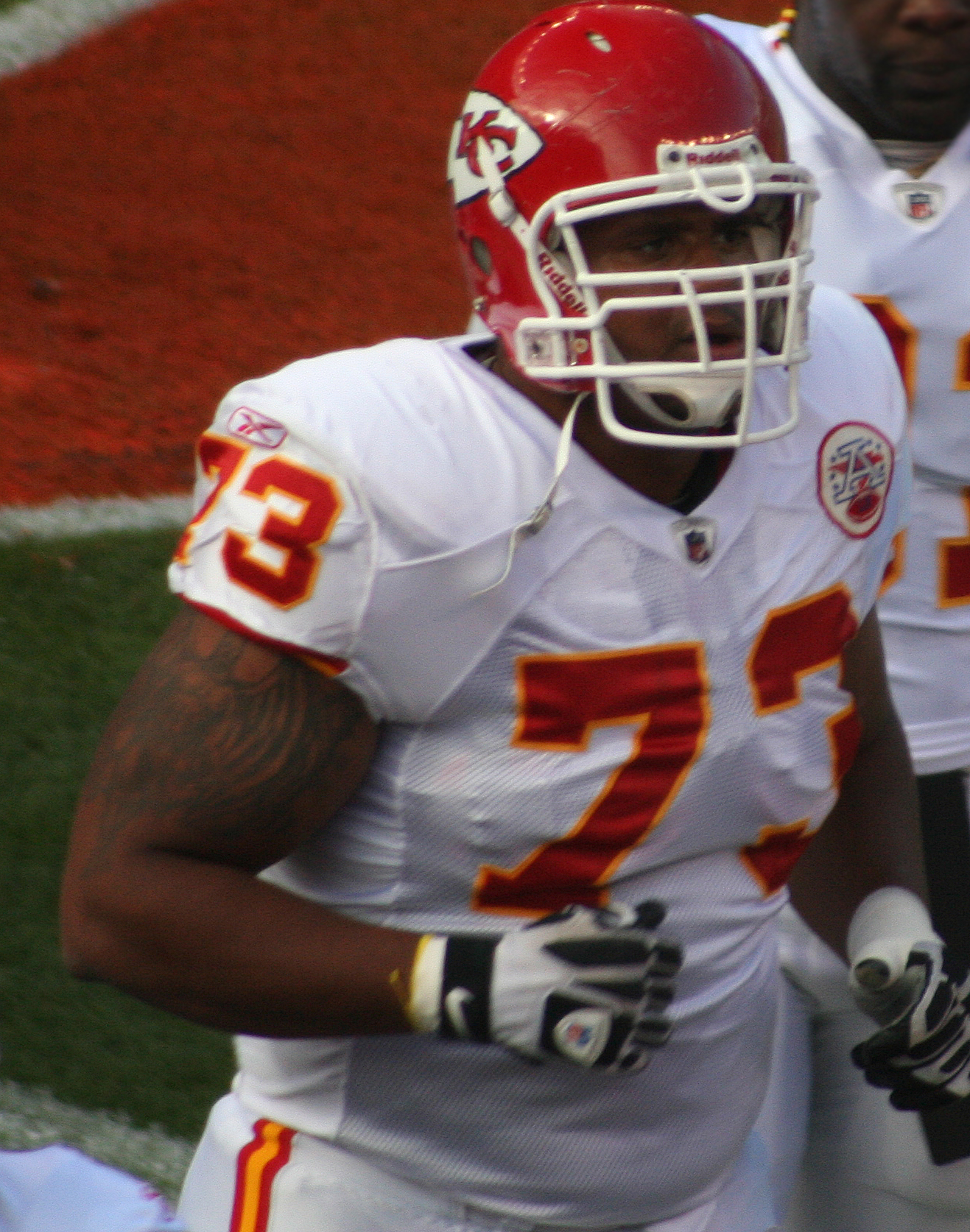
- Asamoah with the Kansas City Chiefs in 2010

No. 73, 75
- Position: Guard

Personal information
- Born: July 21, 1988 (age 38); Matteson, Illinois, U.S.
- Listed height: 6 ft 4 in (1.93 m)
- Listed weight: 304 lb (138 kg)

Career information
- High school: Rich East (Park Forest, Illinois)
- College: Illinois
- NFL draft: 2010: 3rd round, 68th overall pick

Career history
- Kansas City Chiefs (2010–2013); Atlanta Falcons (2014–2015)

Awards and highlights
- Second-team All-American (2009); Second-team All-Big Ten (2009)

Career NFL statistics
- Games played: 75
- Games started: 56
- Stats at Pro Football Reference

Jonathan Yao-Lante Asamoah (born July 21, 1988) is an American former professional football player who was an offensive guard in the National Football League (NFL). He was selected by the Kansas City Chiefs in the third round of the 2010 NFL draft. He played college football for the Illinois Fighting Illini. Asamoah also played for the Atlanta Falcons.

== Early life ==
Asamoah attended Rich East High School in Park Forest, Illinois, where he was a two-time first-team SICA Green All-Conference selection and helped the offense to gain over 3,100 rushing yards. He was an All-State selection by the Chicago Sun-Times, and an All-Midwest Region selection by PrepStar.

Considered a two-star recruit by Rivals.com, Asamoah was not ranked among the nation's best offensive linemen prospects in 2005. He originally committed to Northern Illinois, but reconsidered his choice after he received an offer by Illinois.

== College career ==
In his initial year at the University of Illinois at Urbana-Champaign, Asamoah played in five of the last six games of the season at offensive guard as a true freshman. In 2007, he started at right guard in all 13 games and was in on 991 offensive plays. He recorded 80 knockdowns, blocking for 2007 Big Ten Player of the Year Rashard Mendenhall, who later was a first-round selection in the 2008 NFL draft.

In his junior season, Asamoah was part of an offensive line that has helped the Illini rank first in the Big Ten in total offense (448.3) and pass offense (274.5) and second in scoring offense (30.4) through 11 games.

In 2009, Asamoah was listed at No. 5 on Rivals.com's preseason interior lineman power ranking. He was also named to the 2009 Outland Trophy watch list.

== Professional career ==
=== Pre-draft ===
Asamoah was considered one of the top interior offensive linemen for the 2010 NFL draft. Sports Illustrated noted he "lacks great bulk but is a solid run blocker".

Pre-draft measurables
Height	Weight	Arm length	Hand span
6 ft 4 in (1.93 m)	305 lb (138 kg)	33 in (0.84 m)	10 1/8 in (0.26 m)
All values from NFL Combine

=== Kansas City Chiefs ===
Asamoah was selected in the third round, 68th overall, by the Kansas City Chiefs. He was the highest selected Illinois offensive lineman since Brad Hopkins in 1993. Asamoah started one game in the 2010 NFL season. It was a game against the Buffalo Bills. The next season, Asamoah started all games of the season.

In 2013, he was expected to compete with Geoff Schwartz for playing time at guard. He ended up starting nine games.

=== Atlanta Falcons ===
Asamoah signed with the Atlanta Falcons on March 11, 2014. He was cut by the Falcons on December 21, 2015.
