= Dominican Summer League Giants =

- Boca Chica

Minor league affiliations
- Class: Rookie
- League: Dominican Summer League
- Division: Boca Chica South

Major league affiliations
- Team: San Francisco Giants

Minor league titles
- League titles (3): 2009; 2010; 2015

Team data
- Name: Giants
- Ballpark: Rawling Foundation Complex
- Owner(s)/ Operator(s): San Francisco Giants
- Manager: Black: Juan Ciriaco Orange: Drew Martinez

The Dominican Summer League Giants or DSL Giants are a minor league baseball team in the Dominican Summer League. The team plays in the Boca Chica South division and is affiliated with the San Francisco Giants.

== History ==
The team first came into existence in 1989, as one of the DSL's original American minor league teams. They shared an affiliation with the Detroit Tigers and were known as the DSL Tigers/Giants.

They were independently affiliated with the Giants from 1990 to 1992, before gaining an affiliation with the Philadelphia Phillies and the Houston Astros in 1993. For 1994, they shared an affiliation with the Baltimore Orioles.

The team became independently affiliated with the Giants again in 1995 and have been so ever since.

== Notable players ==
- Kervin Castro (born 1999), Venezuelan baseball pitcher for the San Francisco Giants
- Luis Matos (born 2002), Venezuelan baseball outfielder for the San Francisco Giants

== Rosters ==
Dominican Summer League Giants Black roster
Players		Coaches/Other
Pitchers: 97 Jan Caraballo; 85 Kendry Castro; 94 Argenis Cayama; 71 Luis De La Torre; 50 Ricardo Estrada; 91 Marlon Franco; 96 Alexander Fuentes; 67 Jose Gonzalez; 46 Alberto Laroche; 82 Jesus Lopez; 52 Jose Meza; 53 Brayan Narvaez; 90 Jose T Perez; -- Fernando Vasquez	Catchers: 12 Jesus Alexander; 89 Alessandro Duran; 94 Yohendry Sanchez; Infielders: 18 Jose Astudillo; 92 Juan Colorado; 13 Jhonny Level; 79 Anthony Marquez; 56 Dennys Riera; 83 Boris Sarduy; Outfielders: 99 Carlos Concepcion; 87 Ricardo Crespo; 81 Vinicius Dos Santos; 74 Evan Estevez; 78 Angel Guzman; 57 Oliver Tejada	Manager: -- Juan Ciriaco; Coaches: -- Michael Blatchford (hitting); -- Osiris Matos (pitching); -- Hector Ortiz (fundamentals); 7-day injured list * On San Francisco Giants 40-man roster ~ Development list # Rehab assignment ∞ Reserve list ‡ Restricted list § Suspended list † Temporarily inactive list Roster updated January 30, 2025; Transactions → More rosters: MiLB • Dominican Summer League → San Francisco Giants minor league players

Dominican Summer League Giants Orange roster
Players		Coaches/Other
Pitchers: 12 Lender Bracho; 43 Brayan Cabello; 88 Simon Colmenares; 84 Luis Custodio; 49 Randry De Leon; -- Winkel Del Rosario; 40 Rainiel Duran; 34 Dilan Fernandez; -- Moises Gonzalez; 35 Delvis Heredia; 56 Luis Hernandez; -- Jeremiah Jones ‡; 65 Jhon Leon; -- Ebduar Loina; -- Yesid Mendoza; 52 Frainer Mejias; -- Ruben Ortiz ‡; 58 Alfonso Perez; -- Carlos Toro; -- Abraham Utrera; 60 Elkyns Villarreal; -- Nien-Hsi Yang ‡	Catchers: -- Diego Alambarrio; 14 Santiago Camacho; -- Miguel Caraballo; -- Carlos Martinez; -- Fernando Pena; 7 Jorge Ramirez; Infielders: -- Yulian Barreto; 17 Yoxander Benitez; 45 Omar Calcurian; -- Alexander Camacaro; 6 Keiberg Camacaro; -- Josuar Gonzalez; 26 Albert Jimenez; 48 Jeyson Moya; -- Yeison Oviedo; 8 Yosneiker Rivas; -- Anthony Tandron; 5 Franco Willias; Outfielders: 61 Miguel Blanco; -- Rainer Espinoza; 2 Luis Frias; 23 Brandon Vasquez; -- Diego Villegas	Manager: -- Drew Martinez; Coaches: -- Lisandro King (fundamentals); -- Jose Medina (fundamentals); -- Juan Parra (hitting); -- Darwin Peguero (pitching); 7-day injured list * On San Francisco Giants 40-man roster ~ Development list # Rehab assignment ∞ Reserve list ‡ Restricted list § Suspended list † Temporarily inactive list Roster updated March 7, 2025; Transactions → More rosters: MiLB • Dominican Summer League → San Francisco Giants minor league players
