= José Quintana =

Colombian baseball player (born 1989)

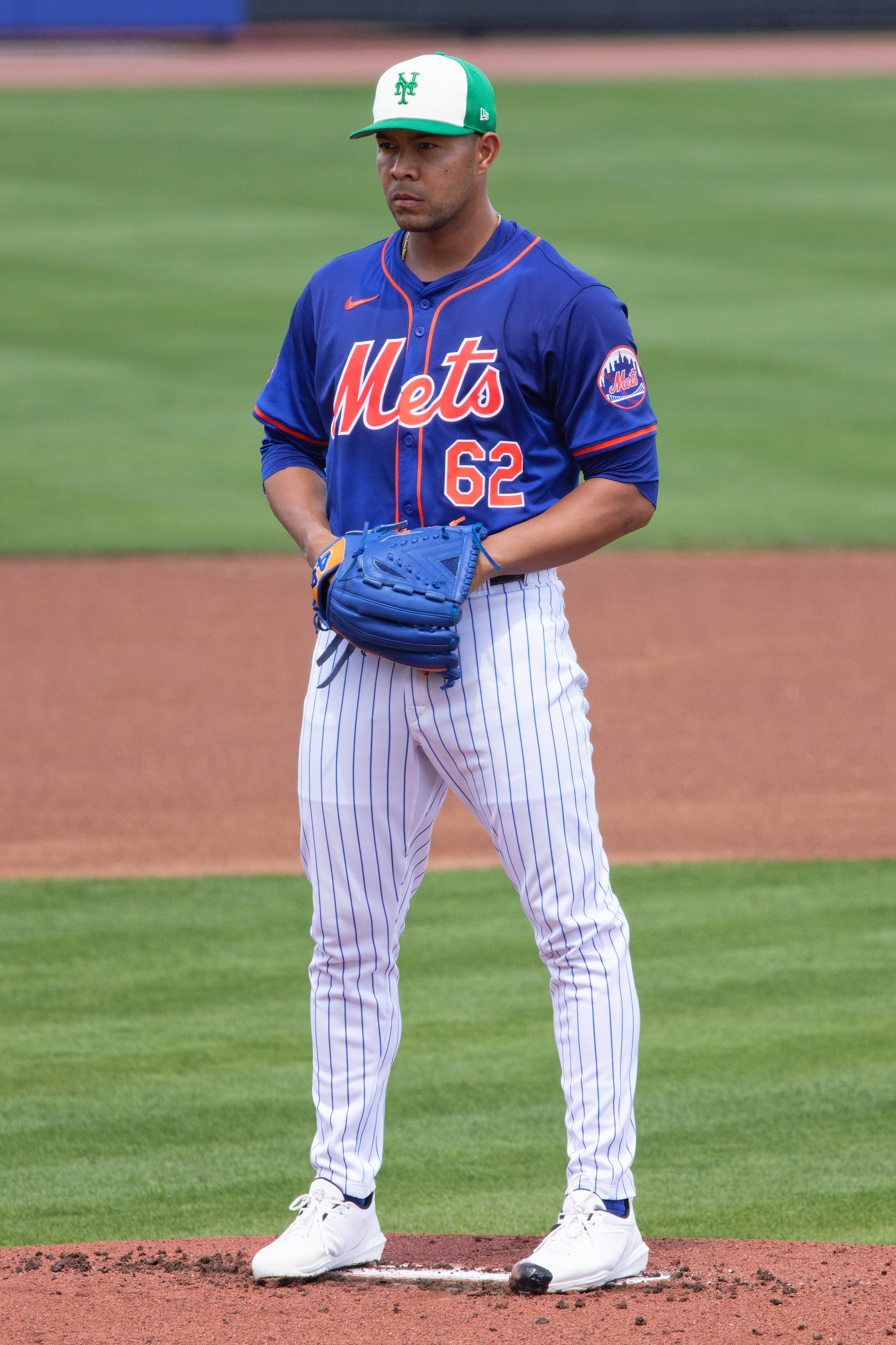
- Quintana with the Mets in 2024

Free agent
- Pitcher
- Born: January 24, 1989 (age 37); Arjona, Bolívar, Colombia
- Bats: Right Throws: Left

MLB debut
- May 7, 2012, for the Chicago White Sox

MLB statistics (through 2026 season)
- Win–loss record: 115–113
- Earned run average: 3.79
- Strikeouts: 1,841
- Stats at Baseball Reference

Teams
- Chicago White Sox (2012–2017); Chicago Cubs (2017–2020); Los Angeles Angels (2021); San Francisco Giants (2021); Pittsburgh Pirates (2022); St. Louis Cardinals (2022); New York Mets (2023–2024); Milwaukee Brewers (2025); Colorado Rockies (2026)

Career highlights and awards
- All-Star (2016)

José Guillermo Quintana (born January 24, 1989) is a Colombian-American professional baseball pitcher who is a free agent. He has played in Major League Baseball (MLB) for the Chicago White Sox, Chicago Cubs, Los Angeles Angels, San Francisco Giants, Pittsburgh Pirates, St. Louis Cardinals, New York Mets, Milwaukee Brewers, and Colorado Rockies.

Quintana pitched in Minor League Baseball for the Mets and New York Yankees organizations before becoming a free agent and signing with the White Sox before the 2012 season. He made his MLB debut in 2012, and was named an All-Star in 2016. The White Sox traded Quintana to the Cubs during the 2017 season, and he played for the Angels and Giants during the 2021 season. Quintana became a free agent after the 2022 season, and signed a contract with the Mets for the 2023 season. After becoming a free agent following the 2024 season, he signed with the Brewers for the 2025 season. After becoming a free agent again following the 2025 season, he signed with the Rockies for the 2026 season.

== Professional career ==
=== Minor leagues (2006–2011) ===
Quintana signed as an international free agent with the New York Mets, and began his professional career in the Rookie-level Venezuelan Summer League (VSL), pitching for the VSL Mets in 2006. He did not play in 2007 as he was suspended for violating the terms of Minor League Baseball's drug policy.

Quintana signed with the New York Yankees in 2008. He pitched the 2008 and 2009 seasons in the Rookie-level Dominican Summer League (DSL) with the DSL Yankees 2. In 2010, he pitched for the Gulf Coast Yankees of the Rookie-level Gulf Coast League and the Charleston RiverDogs of the Class A South Atlantic League. In 2011, Quintana posted a 10–2 win–loss record and a 2.91 earned run average (ERA), with 88 strikeouts in 102 innings pitched for the Tampa Yankees of the Class A-Advanced Florida State League (FSL). He became a minor league free agent after the 2011 season.

=== Chicago White Sox (2012–2017) ===
Chicago White Sox' scouts Daraka Shaheed and Joe Siers, who watched Quintana pitch in the FSL the previous season, recommended that the team sign him. Quintana signed with the White Sox, receiving a major league contract, on November 10, 2011. The White Sox assigned Quintana to the Birmingham Barons of the Class AA Southern League.

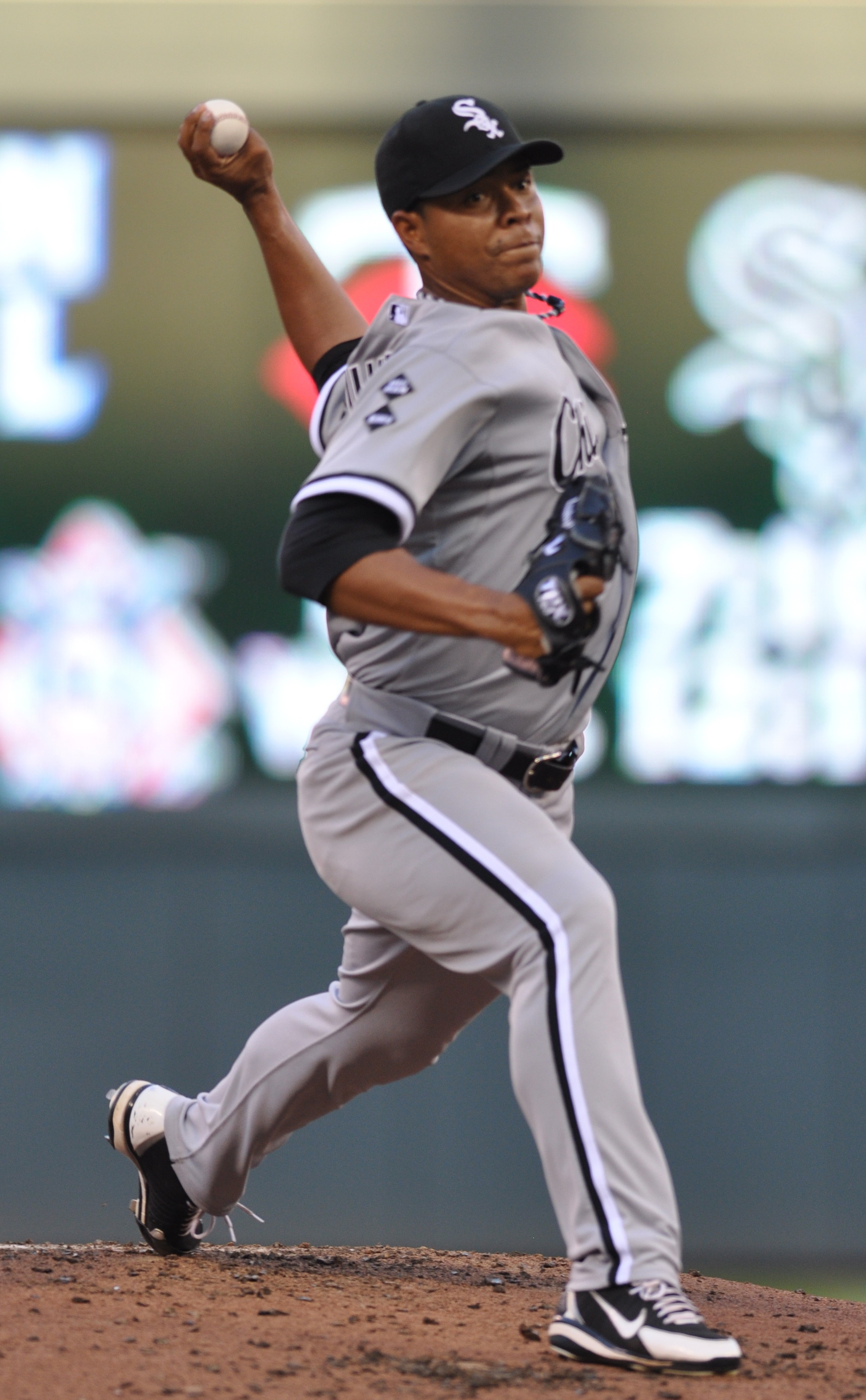
Quintana pitching for the White Sox in 2012

After he started the season with a 1–2 win–loss record, a 3.06 ERA, and 26 strikeouts in 35 innings pitched for Birmingham, the White Sox promoted Quintana to the majors on May 7, 2012, in accordance with the new MLB rule allowing teams to carry a 26th man on their 25-man roster during the day of a doubleheader. He made his MLB debut in the first game of the doubleheader, pitching 5 2/3 innings in relief, allowing no runs, one hit, and two walks while striking out three. Quintana was optioned back to Birmingham the next day, staying until May 24, when he was promoted to the Charlotte Knights of the Class AAA International League. One day later, having not thrown a pitch for the Knights, Quintana was promoted to Chicago, as John Danks was placed on the 15-day IL. On May 25, Quintana got his first Major League victory during a 9–3 victory over the Cleveland Indians, pitching six innings, giving up two runs on four hits, walking three, and striking out four.

During a game against the Tampa Bay Rays on May 30, 2012, Quintana was ejected by umpire Mark Wegner after throwing a pitch behind Ben Zobrist. During the 2012 year, Quintana appeared in 25 games making 22 starts going 6–6 with a 3.76 ERA.

In 2013, Quintana pitched 200 innings in 33 starts, going 9–7 with 164 strikeouts and a 3.51 ERA. His 17 no decisions were the most among MLB starting pitchers in 2013. On March 24, 2014, Quintana signed a five-year extension with the White Sox, which also included club options for a further two years. He qualified as a "Super 2" arbitration eligible player after the 2014 season, activating a clause in his contract which made the deal worth a guaranteed $26.5 million. During the 2014 year, Quintana made 32 starts, going 9–11 with 178 strikeouts and a 3.32 ERA in 200 1/3 innings. He followed up with a 3.36 ERA and 9–10 record with 177 strikeouts in 206 1/3 innings in 2015. That season he led all major league pitchers in curveball percentage (30.9%).

Through the All-Star break in 2016, Quintana pitched to a 7–8 record with a 3.21 ERA in 117 2/3 innings pitched. He was named to the MLB All-Star Game as an injury replacement for Danny Salazar. He finished the season 13–12 with a 3.20 ERA, and striking out 181 batters, while making 32 starts. Quintana finished tied for tenth in the voting for the American League Cy Young Award with Michael Fulmer, receiving one fifth place vote.

The White Sox named him their Opening Day starting pitcher for the 2017 season.

=== Chicago Cubs (2017–2020) ===
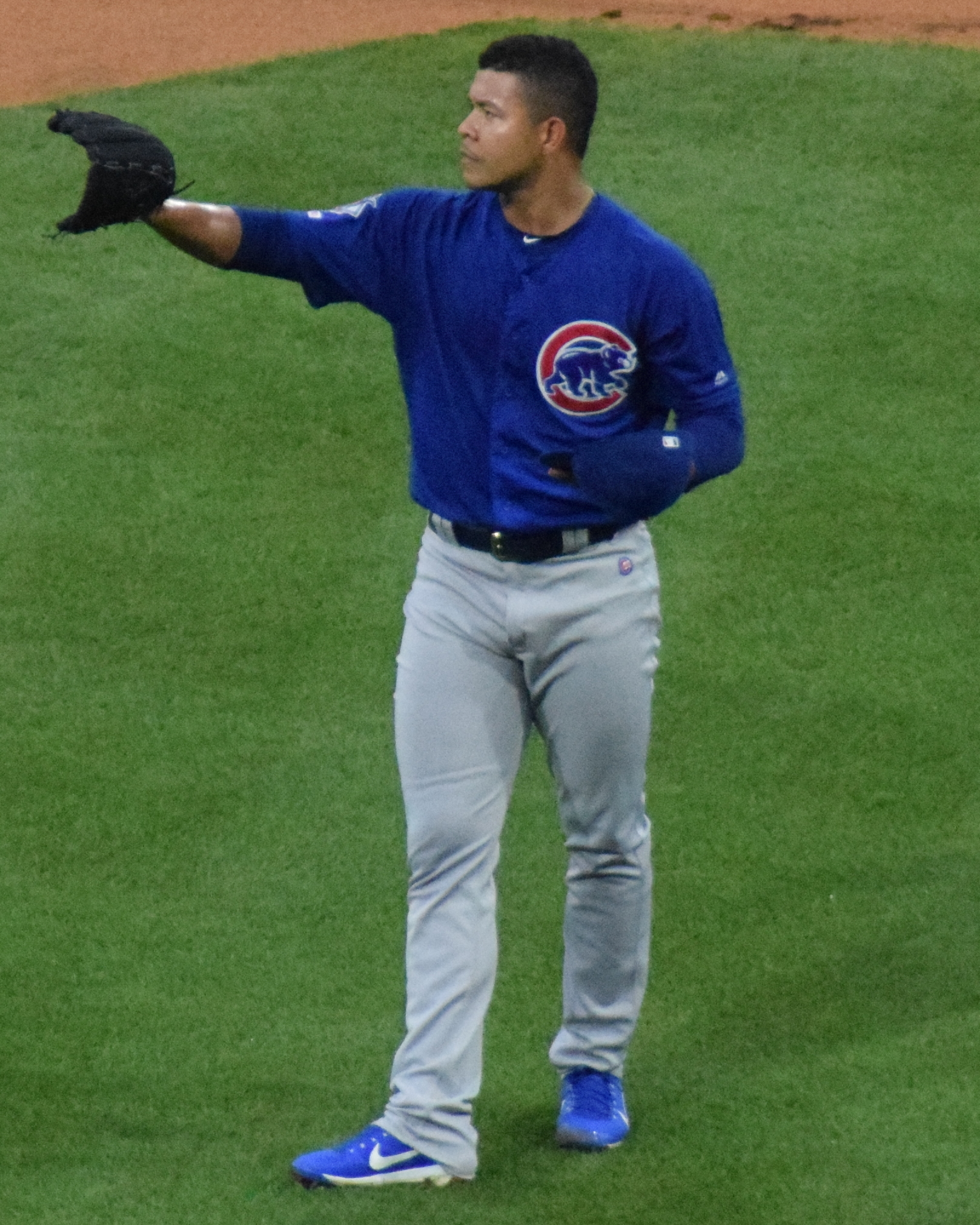
Quintana with the Cubs in 2019

On July 13, 2017, the White Sox traded Quintana to the Chicago Cubs for prospects Eloy Jiménez, Dylan Cease, Matt Rose, and Bryant Flete. He made his first start for the Cubs on July 16, striking out 12 in an 8–0 victory against the Baltimore Orioles. Quintana struggled in August, allowing six home runs in 33 innings pitched and allowing six runs in two of the games he started, but had a 2.51 ERA in five starts in September. Between the two teams, in 2017 he was 11–11 with a 4.15 ERA.

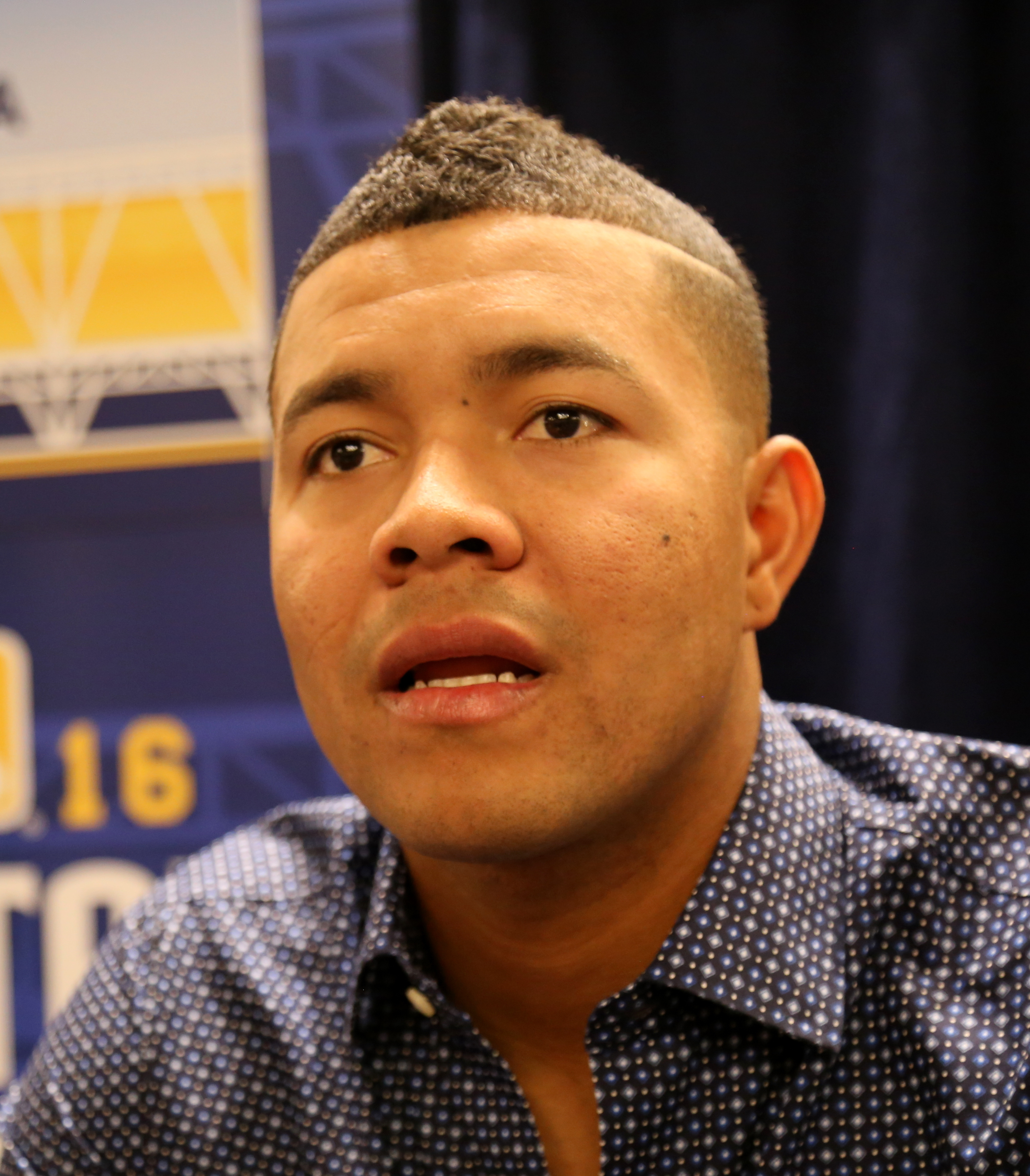
Quintana at the 2016 MLB All-Star Game

Quintana had a 13–11 record and a 4.03 ERA in 32 starts for the Cubs in 2018. He started the 2018 National League Central tie-breaker game, also known as Game 163, in which the Milwaukee Brewers defeated the Cubs. After the season, the Cubs exercised their $10.5 million contract option on Quintana for the 2019 season.

Quintana pitched to a 4–1 record with a 2.02 ERA for the month of August 2019. In 2019 he was 13–9 with a 4.68 ERA.

In July 2020, Quintana underwent surgery to repair a lacerated nerve on his thumb on his throwing arm, which he incurred while washing dishes. He pitched 10 innings in the season, with a 4.50 ERA.

=== Los Angeles Angels (2021) ===
On January 22, 2021, Quintana signed a one-year, $8 million contract with the Angels. On May 31, he was placed on the 10-day injured list due to shoulder inflammation. He was activated from the injured list on June 21 and made his return the next day against the San Francisco Giants, and was moved to the bullpen in the process. Quintana struggled for the Angels, posting an 0–3 record with a 6.75 ERA, and 73 strikeouts through 24 appearances.

=== San Francisco Giants (2021) ===
On August 30, 2021, Quintana was claimed off of waivers by the San Francisco Giants. Quintana made five appearances for the Giants, posting a 4.66 ERA with 12 strikeouts. On September 30, he was designated for assignment. On October 15, Quintana elected free agency.

=== Pittsburgh Pirates (2022) ===
On November 29, 2021, the Pittsburgh Pirates signed Quintana to a one-year contract for $2 million. After having four no decisions and a loss in his first five games as a Pirate, Quintana earned his first win with the team on May 9, pitching six scoreless innings against the Los Angeles Dodgers, striking out five. He tossed seven scoreless innings the very next game against the division rival Reds, but was given another no decision as the team failed to score while he was on the field. For May, he compiled a 2.00 ERA in 27 innings pitched, striking out 21, and going 1–1 for the month.

After compiling a 4.80 ERA and a 0–2 record in six starts in June, Quintana compiled a 3.67 ERA and a 2–1 record in July, earning victories against the New York Yankees on July 5, and against the Miami Marlins on July 23, tossing seven scoreless and striking out four in the latter game.

=== St. Louis Cardinals (2022) ===
On July 29, the Pirates traded Quintana and Chris Stratton to the St. Louis Cardinals for Malcom Núñez and Johan Oviedo. He had a 3.50 ERA at this point in the season. He made his debut for the Cardinals on August 4 in the second game of a double-header at Busch Stadium, tossing six innings of one-run baseball, and striking out seven. He was charged with another no decision, although St. Louis would win the game, 7–2. He earned his first win with the team against the Colorado Rockies in his next start. He ended August with a 3.38 ERA for the month, a 1–1 record, and 20 strikeouts in 29 innings pitched. In September, Quintana won his first start of the month against the Washington Nationals on September 6, and followed this up with eight scoreless innings and six strikeouts against the Cincinnati Reds on September 17. Quintana had a 0.89 ERA in five starts in September, pitching 30 innings, striking out 28 while walking just three, and only allowed three earned runs during the whole month.

For the 2022 season, Quintana finished with a career-best 2.93 ERA in 165 2/3 total innings pitched, striking out 137 in 32 games played, all of them starts. Quintana started Game 1 of Wild Card Series against the Philadelphia Phillies. In the game, he pitched 5 1/3 scoreless innings, striking out three, and walking just one. However, he was charged with another no-decision, as Phillies starting pitcher Zack Wheeler kept the Cardinals from scoring.

=== New York Mets (2023–2024) ===
On December 9, 2022, Quintana signed a two-year, $26 million contract with the New York Mets. Just an inning and two thirds into spring training, however, Quintana was diagnosed with a stress fracture in his rib cage. He withdrew from the 2023 World Baseball Classic, in which he had been expected to lead the Colombia national baseball team's pitching staff. The Mets announced the following week that additional testing found a benign lesion on his rib and that Quintana would be undergoing surgery which would keep him out until at least July. On June 13, 2023, he began a rehab assignment with the Low–A St. Lucie Mets. Quintana was activated from the injured list on July 14, and made his season debut against the Chicago White Sox on July 20 striking out 3 batters allowing no walks, 2 runs, and 6 hits in 5 innings. Quintana made 13 starts for the Mets in 2023, posting a 3–6 record, a 3.57 ERA, and 60 strikeouts across 75 2/3 innings pitched.

Quintana started for the Mets on Opening Day of the 2024 season. 7–9 through the start of September, he recorded his 100th career win against the Cincinnati Reds on September 7, striking out 6 in 6 2/3 shutout innings. As such, he became the first Colombian-born pitcher to attain the milestone, and helped the Mets achieve their 9th straight win. Quintana would end his 2024 campaign with a 10–10 record, a 3.75 ERA, and 135 strikeouts in 170 1/3 innings. He went 3–1 in September with a 0.73 ERA for the month, following a loss against the Milwaukee Brewers on September 28.

In the 2024 NL Wild Card Series against the Brewers, Quintana was stated to start the decisive Game 3. In the game, he pitched 6 scoreless innings, striking out 5 and walking just one. He was given a no-decision, as he dueled against rookie Tobias Myers, who also blanked the Mets. The Mets would advance, however, after rallying in the 9th inning from a Pete Alonso 3-run home run to overcome a 0–2 deficit, eventually winning 4–2. In the 2024 MLB postseason, Quintana made 3 starts for the Mets, posting a 3.14 ERA and 13 strikeouts across 14 1/3 innings pitched.

=== Milwaukee Brewers (2025) ===
On March 5, 2025, Quintana signed a one-year, $4.25 million contract with the Milwaukee Brewers. He consented to be optioned to the Triple-A Nashville Sounds to begin the season, in order to build up after missing half of spring training. On April 11, in his first started as a Brewer, Quintana became the 24th pitcher to earn a win against all 30 teams against the Arizona Diamondbacks. He joined Gerrit Cole, Charlie Morton, Max Scherzer, and Justin Verlander as the only active pitchers to do so.

Quintana started his Brewers tenure with a tremendous April, winning all 4 of his starts, and recording a superb 1.14 ERA for the month. Despite sporting a higher ERA on all subsequent months after this, with a 6.10 in May (2 starts), 4.15 in June (5 starts), and 4.03 in July (4 starts), Quintana pitched to a 9–4 record through his second start of August, a 5–4 win over the Atlanta Braves, in which he recorded a season-high 7 strikeouts, while allowing 3 earned runs in 6 innings of work. On September 14, during a loss against the St. Louis Cardinals, Quintana took a comebacker to the leg from Pedro Pagés in the 4th inning. He finished the frame, but was ultimately pulled from the game by manager Pat Murphy out of caution. 3 days later, on September 17, Quintana was placed on the 15 day injured list due to a left calf strain, effectively ending his regular season. On his first season with the Brewers, Quintana pitched to a 11–7 record, a 3.96 ERA, and 89 strikeouts in 131 2/3 innings of work.

Quintana returned to the Brewers for the NLDS series against the rival Chicago Cubs, apperaring in Game 3 at Wrigley Field. He pitched 3 scoreless innings, striking out two, in relief of Quinn Priester, who allowed 4 runs in the first inning, in an eventual 4-3 loss. Quintana also made to 40-man roster for the NLCS against the Los Angeles Dodgers. His option was declined on November 4, 2025, making him a free agent.

=== Colorado Rockies (2026–present) ===
On February 12, 2026, Quintana signed a one-year contract with the Colorado Rockies worth $6 million. Following his first start against the Miami Marlins, Quintana was placed on the 15-day IL for a right hamstring strain. He made his return against the Houston Astros on April 15, taking the loss. He would finally notch his first win as a Rockie on April 25, tossing 5 1/3 innings against the New York Mets, striking out 5 and allowing just one earned run. On May 28, Quintana was placed on the 60-day injured list due to a left elbow sprain. He was activated on September 19.

== International career ==
Quintana pitched for the Colombia national baseball team in the 2017 World Baseball Classic. He was slated to play with Colombia at the 2023 World Baseball Classic, but withdrew due to a stress fracture in his rib cage during spring training with the Mets.

Quintana was named to the Colombian roster for the 2026 World Baseball Classic qualifiers, held in March 2025 in Tucson, Arizona.

== Personal life ==
Quintana and his wife, Michel, live in the Miami area and have two daughters. During the 2017 Major League Baseball postseason, the Cubs' chartered flight from Washington to Los Angeles had to be diverted to Albuquerque when Quintana's wife fell ill. He started the team's next game nonetheless. Quintana became an American citizen in 2024.

== See also ==
- List of Major League Baseball players from Colombia
