= Jarlín García =

Dominican baseball player (born 1993)

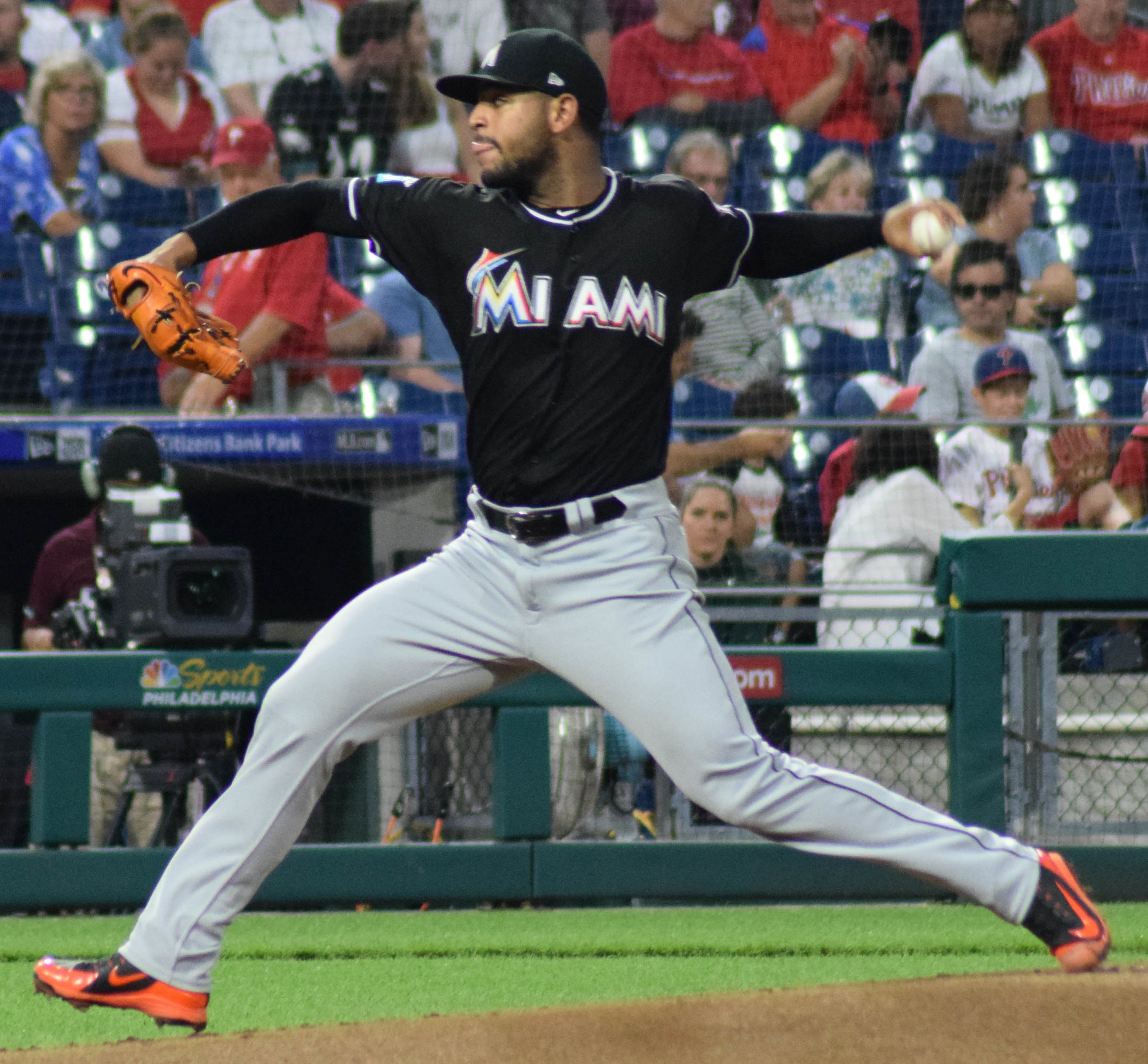
- García with the Miami Marlins in 2018

Leones del Escogido
- Relief pitcher
- Born: January 18, 1993 (age 33); Santo Domingo, Dominican Republic
- Bats: Left Throws: Left

MLB debut
- April 14, 2017, for the Miami Marlins

MLB statistics (through 2022 season)
- Win–loss record: 17–15
- Earned run average: 3.61
- Strikeouts: 259
- Stats at Baseball Reference

Teams
- Miami Marlins (2017–2019); San Francisco Giants (2020–2022)

Jarlín Emmanuel García (born January 18, 1993), nicknamed the Elephant, is a Dominican professional baseball pitcher who is a free agent. García signed as an international free agent with the Miami Marlins in 2010, and debuted for them in 2017. He has previously played in Major League Baseball (MLB) for the Marlins and the San Francisco Giants.

== Early life ==
Growing up in Pedro Brand in the Dominican Republic, García played soccer, not trying baseball until he was 15 years old. The next year, his younger sister died of drowning.

== Career ==
=== Minor leagues ===
García signed as a free agent with the Miami Marlins in August 2010, receiving a $40,000 signing bonus. He progressed slowly through Minor League Baseball starting in 2011 at 18 years of age, and in 2014 was 10–5 with a 4.38 ERA with 111 strikeouts (10th in the South Atlantic League) in 25 starts with the Greensboro Grasshoppers. He was left exposed in the Rule 5 draft after the 2014 season.

In 2015, the Marlins assigned García to the Jupiter Hammerheads of the High-A Florida State League (FSL). García appeared in the FSL All-Star Game and was chosen to represent the Marlins at the 2015 All-Star Futures Game. The Marlins promoted him to the Jacksonville Suns of the Double-A Southern League in July. In 25 combined starts, García had a 3.57 earned run average (ERA) and 104 strikeouts in 133 2/3 innings pitched. The Marlins added García to their 40-man roster after the season, protecting him from the Rule 5 draft.

García began the 2016 season with Jacksonville. After making seven starts with a 4.04 ERA for the Suns, the Marlins promoted him to the major leagues on May 15, 2016. They returned him to Jacksonville on May 20, without him appearing in a major league game. Playing for Mesa in the Arizona Fall League, he was named a Rising Star.

=== Miami Marlins (2017–19) ===
After starting the 2017 season with Jacksonville, the Marlins promoted García to the major leagues on April 14. Working as a relief pitcher, García led the team with 68 games played. He pitched to a 1–2 win–loss record with a 4.73 ERA in 53 1/3 innings. He was named the Marlins Rookie of the Year.

In 2018, García made the Marlins' Opening Day roster as a relief pitcher. On April 11, 2018, in his first major league start, García did not allow a hit in six innings pitched against the New York Mets. Through 12 appearances, 6 starts, he was 1–1 with a 4.41 ERA with 40 strikeouts in 66 innings before being sent down to AAA. Batters had a barrel percentage against him of 22%, putting him in the bottom 3% in that category, and he induced a strikeout percentage of 14.4%, in the bottom 4% in MLB.

In 2019 with the Marlins he was 4–2 with a 3.02 ERA in 53 relief appearances covering 50.2 innings. García was designated for assignment by the Marlins on February 10, 2020.

=== San Francisco Giants (2020–2022) ===
García was claimed off waivers by the San Francisco Giants. He was superb for the Giants in 2020, pitching to a 0.49 ERA with a 19.2% strikeout rate across 18.1 innings of work in 19 games, with an 0.982 WHIP.

In the 2021 regular season, García was 6–3 with one save and a 2.63 ERA. He pitched in 58 relief appearances, pitching 68.2 innings in which he averaged 6.3 hits, 2.4 walks, and 8.9 strikeouts per 9 innings for an 0.961 WHIP. He inducted batters to chase his pitches that were out of the strike zone only 22.5% of the time, in the bottom 3% in MLB.

In 2022, García was 1–4 with one save and a 3.74 ERA in 58 relief appearances for the Giants, covering 65 innings. On November 15, García was designated for assignment by the Giants after they protected multiple prospects from the Rule 5 draft. On November 18, he was non–tendered and became a free agent.

=== Pittsburgh Pirates (2023) ===
On December 28, 2022, García signed a one-year, $2.5 million contract with the Pittsburgh Pirates. The deal also included a $3.25-million club option for 2024. He did not play in 2023 due to injury and the Pirates declined his club option, making him a free agent.

García spent the 2024–25 and 2025–26 offseasons pitching for the Toros del Este of the Dominican Winter League.

=== Sultanes de Monterrey ===
On May 29, 2026, García signed with the Sultanes de Monterrey of the Mexican League. In three appearances (one start) for the Sultanes, he struggled to a 15.75 ERA, allowing seven earned runs in just four innings pitched. On June 15, García was released by Monterrey.
