= Kervin Castro =

Venezuelan baseball player (born 1999)

New York Yankees – No. 74
- Relief pitcher
- Born: February 7, 1999 (age 27); Maracay, Venezuela
- Bats: Right Throws: Right

MLB debut
- September 7, 2021, for the San Francisco Giants

MLB statistics (through 2026 season)
- Win–loss record: 1–2
- Earned run average: 4.22
- Strikeouts: 32
- Stats at Baseball Reference

Teams
- San Francisco Giants (2021–2022); Chicago Cubs (2022); New York Yankees (2026–present)

Kervin Alexander Castro (born February 7, 1999) is a Venezuelan professional baseball pitcher for the New York Yankees of Major League Baseball (MLB). He has previously played in MLB for the San Francisco Giants and Chicago Cubs. He signed with the Giants as an international free agent in 2015, and made his MLB debut with them in 2021.

== Baseball career ==
Castro was born in Maracay, Venezuela. At 15 years of age, he hit 88 mph in his second bullpen session.

=== San Francisco Giants ===
==== Minor leagues ====
Castro signed with the San Francisco Giants as an international free agent for $100,000 in 2015, when he was 16 years old. Originally a catcher, he converted to pitcher. In 2016, he pitched for the Rookie-level DSL Giants in the Dominican Summer League (DSL; Southern Division), and had a 3–1 win–loss record with a 4.71 earned run average (ERA) in 14 relief appearances covering 21 innings. He underwent Tommy John surgery in 2017. That led to him missing all of the 2017 season and nearly all of the 2018 season, only pitching one inning in 2018 in the DSL.

In 2019 he was both a mid-season and post-season Northwest League All Star for the Low-A Salem-Keizer Volcanoes, for whom he was 5–3 with a 2.66 ERA and 0.96 WHIP (leading the league) in 14 starts (2nd) covering 67 2/3 innings (2nd). He did not play in a game in 2020 due to the cancellation of the minor league season because of the COVID-19 pandemic. On November 20, 2020, the Giants added Castro to their 40-man roster in order to protect him from the Rule 5 draft.

Castro split 2021 between the Triple-A West Sacramento River Cats and the major league Giants. With the River Cats, Castro was 6–1 with one save and a 2.86 ERA in 30 relief appearances covering 44 innings, in which he gave up 6.3 hits and struck out 12.3 batters per 9 innings. He throws a fastball that reaches 97 mph, a sharp power curveball, and a changeup.

==== Major leagues ====
On September 6, 2021, Castro was called up by the Giants to the major leagues. A day later, he made his MLB debut against the Colorado Rockies at 22 years of age. Castro pitched two scoreless innings, allowing two hits and striking out one batter.

In the 2021 regular season, he was 1–1 with an 0.00 ERA. In 10 games he pitched 13 1/3 relief innings, in which he had 13 strikeouts. In the post-season, in the 2021 NLDS he pitched an additional 1 1/3 innings of shutout ball in two games, for a combined total of 14 2/3 innings of 0.00 ERA baseball on the season.

On August 1, 2022, Castro was designated for assignment by the Giants.

=== Chicago Cubs ===
On August 2, 2022, he was claimed off waivers by the Chicago Cubs and was optioned to Triple-A Iowa Cubs. He struggled to a 7.59 ERA across 8 appearances for Chicago, and was designated for assignment on September 6. He cleared waivers and was sent outright to Triple–A on September 9. Castro elected free agency following the season on November 10.

=== Detroit Tigers ===
On December 12, 2022, Castro signed a minor league deal with the Detroit Tigers organization. In 2023, he made 10 appearances for the Triple–A Toledo Mud Hens, recording a 2.30 ERA with 19 strikeouts and 1 save in 15 2/3 innings pitched. On June 14, 2023, it was announced that Castro had undergone Tommy John surgery, ending his season. He was released by the Tigers organization on August 9.

=== New York Yankees ===
On November 18, 2023, Castro signed a minor league contract with the Houston Astros. The New York Yankees selected Castro from the Astros in the minor league phase of the Rule 5 draft on December 6. He spent the 2024 season in rehabilitation due to his elbow surgery.

In 2025, Castro made 35 appearances for the Triple-A Scranton/Wilkes-Barre Rail Riders, logging a 5–1 record and 1.53 ERA with 52 strikeouts and four saves across 47 innings of work. On November 6, 2025, the Yankees added Castro to their 40-man roster to prevent him from reaching minor league free agency.

Castro was optioned to Triple-A Scranton/Wilkes-Barre to begin the 2026 season. He made five appearances for the Yankees, recording a 1.42 ERA with eight strikeouts across 6 1/3 innings pitched. On August 11, Castro was placed on the injured list due to right elbow neuritis. He was transferred to the 60–day injured list on August 26, officially ending his season.

== See also ==
- List of baseball players who underwent Tommy John surgery
- Rule 5 draft results
