= Lou Castro =

Colombian baseball player (1876–1941)

Luis Castro
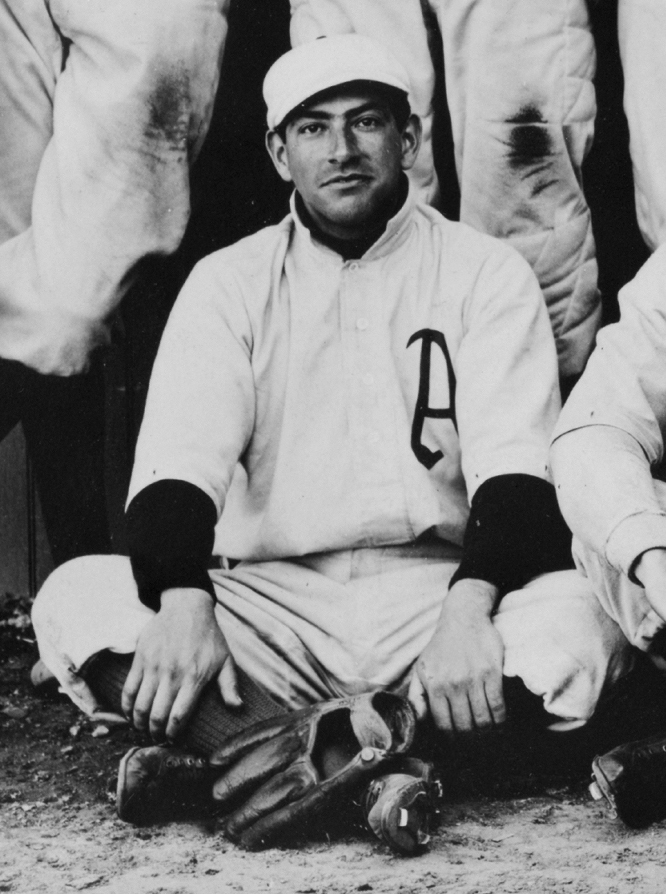
- Second baseman
- Born: November 25, 1876; Medellín, Antioquia, Colombia
- Died: September 24, 1941 (aged 64); New York City, U.S.
- Batted: Right Threw: Right

MLB debut
- April 23, 1902, for the Philadelphia Athletics

Last MLB appearance
- September 27, 1902, for the Philadelphia Athletics

MLB statistics
- Batting average: .245
- Hits: 35
- Runs scored: 18
- Stats at Baseball Reference

Teams
- Philadelphia Athletics (1902)

Luis Miguel Castro (November 25, 1876 – September 24, 1941), nicknamed "Jud" and "Count", was a professional baseball infielder who was born in Medellín, Colombia. He is considered the first Latin American to play in recognized Major League Baseball. Castro was a second baseman who played 42 games with the Philadelphia Athletics in their pennant-winning 1902 season.

== Early life ==
Luis Miguel Castro was born to Nestor Castro, a banker, and Inez Agnes Vasquez in Medellín on November 25, 1876. Castro's father fled the country during a renewed period of civil war; that experience was apparently traumatic for the young Castro, who told a Philadelphia reporter in 1902 (during another period of civil war) that he would "never go back home" because of the political violence. "If they don’t have a rebellion every few months the whole country gets an impatient idea that something has gone wrong. Then they begin a revolution to right it."

Castro attended Manhattan College, a Catholic school, then located in Harlem. In 1895, at 18, he joined the college's Manhattan Jaspers baseball team, playing as a right-handed utility infielder, outfielder, and even as a pitcher; he was named by Sporting Life as one of the top college players on the East Coast by 1898.

== Career ==
Castro was signed by Philadelphia Athletics manager Connie Mack while he was playing semi-pro ball in the Connecticut League. He was a replacement for Nap Lajoie, whose contract with the Athletics had been challenged in court by the cross-town Philadelphia Phillies; when the Pennsylvania Supreme Court barred Lajoie from playing for any other team in the state, the future Hall-of-Famer was traded to the Cleveland Bronchos, and Castro was called up as his replacement.

In his brief 42-game stint with the Athletics, he posted a .245 batting average, with one home run and 15 runs batted in, 35 hits, 18 runs scored, 8 doubles, 1 triple and two stolen bases in 143 at bats. Castro proved a decent hitter but a poor defender, and played sparingly through the second half of the season. Nevertheless, the Athletics would eventually win the American League pennant, and Castro, well-liked among his teammates, reportedly took it upon himself to act as master of ceremonies at the team's celebratory banquet.

Castro was released by the Athletics in 1903. He played in the Eastern League (today's International League), first with the Rochester Bronchos, who later traded him to the Baltimore Orioles; Castro hit .329 and led the league in triples (23). The next year he signed a $2,000 contract with the Portland Browns of the Pacific Coast League, briefly acting as team captain. On the West Coast, his foreign ancestry was more apparent, with one California newspaper describing him as walking "like a Mexican." Nevertheless, he was relatively well-liked and well known for his genial demeanor and practical jokes.

Castro played for various teams in the American Association and Southern Association, and managed teams in the South Atlantic and Virginia Leagues.

== Ancestry ==
During his playing career, newspapers variously described Castro as being Colombian, Spanish, Mexicans, Venezuelan, and Cuban. Castro himself was vague about his ancestry. In 1902, he claimed to be the nephew of Venezuela's then-president, Cipriano Castro, earning him the sobriquet "The President of Venezuela"; he later denied the relationship in 1909 after President Castro had been deposed.

Castro applied for U.S. citizenship on July 10, 1917, noting his birthplace as Medellin, Colombia. However, in subsequent documents (a 1922 passport application and the 1930 US census) he listed his birthplace as New York. This has led to confusion about his birthplace. Baseball researcher Gary Ashwill suggests that Castro was not granted citizenship and, fearing reprisal, lied about his American birth from that point on. It is also possible that it was to receive economic benefits in his old age, as he did from the Association of Professional Baseball Players of America in 1937. What is clear is that Castro probably wanted to pass for an American citizen by birth.

Several baseball databases such as Baseball Reference and Baseball Almanac originally reflected his birthplace as New York, but the discovery of the ship's information and passenger list provides a solid and perhaps irrefutable proof about his immigration to America. Despite the fact that he was not the first player who was brought by a team to play in the Major Leagues, Castro is recognized and credited as the first Major League Baseball player ever born in a Latin American country.

== Death and legacy ==
Castro died in New York City at the age of 64.

He was buried with no tombstone at Mount St. Mary's Cemetery in Flushing, Queens, New York. According to the Society for American Baseball Research, Castro is at Division 10, row 9, number 18 in this cemetery. On July 20, 2021, Queens State Senator Jessica Ramos unveiled a new tombstone for Castro on Colombian Independence Day at the cemetery.

== See also ==
- List of players from Colombia in Major League Baseball
