= Steve Stanicek =

American baseball player

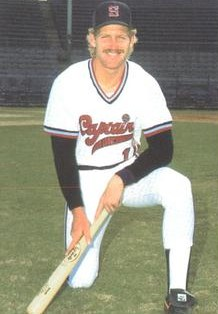
- Designated hitter
- Born: June 19, 1961 (age 65); Lake Forest, Illinois, U.S.
- Batted: Right Threw: Right

MLB debut
- September 16, 1987, for the Milwaukee Brewers

Last MLB appearance
- October 1, 1989, for the Philadelphia Phillies

MLB statistics
- Batting average: .188
- Home runs: 0
- Runs batted in: 1
- Stats at Baseball Reference

Teams
- Milwaukee Brewers (1987); Philadelphia Phillies (1989)

Stephen Blair Stanicek (born June 19, 1961) is an American former Major League Baseball player. He played parts of two seasons in the majors, 1987 for the Milwaukee Brewers and 1989 for the Philadelphia Phillies. He played 13 games, twelve as a pinch hitter and one as a designated hitter. He was primarily a first baseman in his professional career, but never played the field in the major leagues.

== Amateur career ==
Stanicek was drafted out of Rich East High School in Park Forest, Illinois in the 16th round of the 1979 MLB draft by the St. Louis Cardinals. He opted to play collegiate baseball for the University of Nebraska–Lincoln. In 1981, he played collegiate summer baseball with the Wareham Gatemen of the Cape Cod Baseball League and was named a league all-star. He was selected in the first round of the 1982 MLB draft by the San Francisco Giants.

== Professional career ==
In a Sept. 16 game at Yankee Stadium, with the visiting Brewers trailing in the seventh inning, Steve Stanicek came to bat for the first time, pinch-hitting. He reached safely against Yankee pitcher Tommy John on an error, and Milwaukee rallied for three runs in the inning and a 5-4 victory.

Two nights later, Stanicek got his first big-league hit. He was a pinch-hitter again, this time in the ninth inning of a game at Tiger Stadium in Detroit that the Brewers were losing 7-1. After a two-run Dale Sveum home run, Stanicek was sent up against Willie Hernández with a teammate on base and delivered a single. Next batter Paul Molitor hit a three-run homer to make it 7-6 and knock Hernandez out of the game, but that's how the game ended.

== Personal life ==
Steve is the brother of fellow former major leaguer Pete Stanicek. The brothers made their Major League debuts 15 days apart in 1987. Stanicek had a successful career as a high school coach in the Chicago area and was a head coach at Glenbrook South High School in Glenview, Illinois.
