= Pete Stanicek =

American baseball player (born 1963)

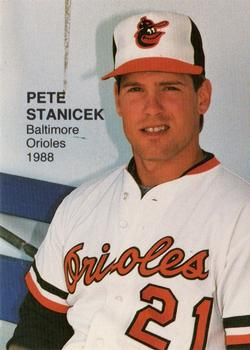
- Left fielder / Second baseman
- Born: April 18, 1963 (age 63); Harvey, Illinois, U.S.
- Batted: Switch Threw: Right

MLB debut
- September 1, 1987, for the Baltimore Orioles

Last MLB appearance
- October 2, 1988, for the Baltimore Orioles

MLB statistics
- Batting average: .243
- Home runs: 4
- Runs batted in: 26
- Stats at Baseball Reference

Teams
- Baltimore Orioles (1987–1988)
Medals
Men's baseball
Representing United States
World Junior Baseball Championship
Silver medal – second place	1981 Newark	Team

Peter Louis Stanicek (born April 18, 1963) is an American former Major League Baseball player. Primarily a second baseman and left fielder, Stanicek was a member of the Baltimore Orioles in 1987 and 1988. He was 5 ft 11 in (1.80 m) and weighed 185 pounds (84 kg). He was a switch-hitter and threw right-handed.

== Amateur career ==
Stanicek is an alumnus of Rich East High School in Park Forest, Illinois and Stanford University. In 1984, he played collegiate summer baseball with the Orleans Cardinals of the Cape Cod Baseball League. He was drafted by the Baltimore Orioles in the 13th round of the 1984 MLB draft, but did not sign with the team. He was again selected by the Orioles in the ninth round of the 1985 MLB draft, and signed this time.

== Professional career ==
He spent the 1986 season with the class A Hagerstown Suns, being selected as second baseman for Carolina League's end-of-season All Star Team.

He was called up to the Baltimore Orioles and batted leadoff on September 1, 1987, in a home game against the Seattle Mariners. Stanicek had one of Baltimore's two hits that night off Seattle's Scott Bankhead in a 5–0 defeat. His sixth-inning leadoff single was his first MLB hit, but he was stranded by the next three batters, brothers Billy and Cal Ripken Jr. and Eddie Murray.

Stanicek played in 30 games that fall with a batting average of .274. He began the 1988 season with Rochester, an AAA team, but was called up on April 29, 1988, after the Orioles began the season with a record-breaking 21-game losing streak. Manager Cal Ripken, Sr. was fired in the midst of it and replaced by Frank Robinson. The losing streak came to end April 29 at Comiskey Park in Chicago, with Stanicek batting leadoff and collecting two hits in a 9-0 Baltimore victory.

He came up to the Orioles as a multi-purpose man, able to play second base, third base and outfield. In 1988, he led his team in stolen bases with 12 and had a batting average of .230.

But he was plagued by injuries, and the 1990 season, which Stanicek spent between Hagerstown and Rochester in the minors, turned out to be his last in professional baseball.

== Personal ==
He is the brother of major leaguer Steve Stanicek. They made their big-league debuts 15 days apart in 1987.
