= 2017 World Baseball Classic Pool D =

Pool D of the First Round of the 2017 World Baseball Classic was held at Estadio Charros de Jalisco, Zapopan, Mexico, from March 9 to 13, 2017, between Italy, Mexico, Puerto Rico, and Venezuela. Pool D was a round-robin tournament. Each team played the other three teams once, with the top two teams advancing to Pool F.

Puerto Rico advanced to the second round after winning all three of its matches. There was a three-way tie for second place, however, because Italy defeated Mexico, Venezuela defeated Italy, and Mexico defeated Venezuela. Per tournament rules, the best two teams would play a tiebreaker game to determine the pool runner-up. Venezuela defeated Italy, to advance to Pool F.

The first tiebreaker criterion is fewest runs allowed per defensive inning played in the games between the tied teams. Mexico allowed 19 runs, Italy allowed 20 runs, and Venezuela allowed 21 runs. Italy and Venezuela played 19 innings each in the two matches, therefore their RA/IPD were 1.053 and 1.105. Mexico played 18 innings, but they recorded no outs in the ninth inning of their game versus Italy, therefore the inning did not count towards their RA/IPD of 1.117.

== Standings ==
| Pos | Team | Pld | W | L | RF | RA | RD | PCT | GB | Qualification |
|---|---|---|---|---|---|---|---|---|---|---|
| 1 | Puerto Rico | 3 | 3 | 0 | 29 | 7 | +22 | 1.000 | — | Advance to second round |
| 2 | Venezuela | 4 | 2 | 2 | 24 | 35 | −11 | .500 | 1.5 | Advance to second round |
| 3 | Italy | 4 | 1 | 3 | 26 | 33 | −7 | .250 | 2.5 | |
| 4 | Mexico (H) | 3 | 1 | 2 | 24 | 28 | −4 | .333 | 2 | |

Rules for classification: Tiebreakers
(H) Hosts

Pool D MVP: (Puerto Rico) Francisco Lindor

== Results ==
- All times are Central Standard Time (UTC−06:00).

=== Italy 10, Mexico 9 ===
March 9, 20:00 at Estadio Charros de Jalisco
| Team | 1 | 2 | 3 | 4 | 5 | 6 | 7 | 8 | 9 | R | H | E |
|---|---|---|---|---|---|---|---|---|---|---|---|---|
| Mexico | 1 | 0 | 1 | 2 | 3 | 0 | 2 | 0 | 0 | 9 | 13 | 1 |
| Italy | 1 | 0 | 0 | 3 | 1 | 0 | 0 | 0 | 5 | 10 | 12 | 1 |
WP: Jordan Romano (1−0) LP: Roberto Osuna (0−1); Home runs: MEX: Esteban Quiroz (1), Japhet Amador (1); ITA: John Andreoli (1), Rob Segedin (1), Chris Colabello (1), Drew Butera (1); Attendance: 14,296 (89.4%); Umpires: HP − Dan Bellino, 1B − Doug Eddings, 2B − Santos Castillo, 3B − Winfried Berkvens; Notes: No outs when winning run scored. Boxscore

=== Puerto Rico 11, Venezuela 0 ===
March 10, 20:00 at Estadio Charros de Jalisco (F/7)
| Team | 1 | 2 | 3 | 4 | 5 | 6 | 7 | 8 | 9 | R | H | E |
|---|---|---|---|---|---|---|---|---|---|---|---|---|
| Venezuela | 0 | 0 | 0 | 0 | 0 | 0 | 0 | X | X | 0 | 3 | 1 |
| Puerto Rico | 0 | 0 | 2 | 0 | 0 | 3 | 6 | X | X | 11 | 10 | 0 |
WP: Seth Lugo (1−0) LP: Félix Hernández (0−1); Home runs: VEN: None; PUR: Carlos Correa (1), Yadier Molina (1), T. J. Rivera (1); Attendance: 14,806 (92.5%); Umpires: HP − Quinn Wolcott, 1B − Michael Ulloa, 2B − Dan Bellino, 3B − Winfried Berkvens; Notes: Completed early due to 10–run mercy rule after 7 innings. Two outs when last run scored. Boxscore

=== Venezuela 11, Italy 10 ===
March 11, 14:00 at Estadio Charros de Jalisco (F/10)
| Team | 1 | 2 | 3 | 4 | 5 | 6 | 7 | 8 | 9 | 10 | R | H | E |
|---|---|---|---|---|---|---|---|---|---|---|---|---|---|
| Venezuela | 0 | 0 | 0 | 0 | 3 | 2 | 3 | 0 | 2 | 1 | 11 | 17 | 2 |
| Italy | 1 | 0 | 2 | 2 | 0 | 0 | 2 | 1 | 2 | 0 | 10 | 12 | 2 |
WP: Francisco Rodríguez (1−0) LP: Trey Nielsen (0−1) Sv: José Castillo (1); Home runs: VEN: Salvador Pérez (1); ITA: Alex Liddi (1), Brandon Nimmo (1); Attendance: 12,187 (76.2%); Umpires: HP − Santos Castillo, 1B − Dan Bellino, 2B − Quinn Wolcott, 3B − Michael Ulloa; Boxscore

=== Puerto Rico 9, Mexico 4 ===
March 11, 20:30 at Estadio Charros de Jalisco
| Team | 1 | 2 | 3 | 4 | 5 | 6 | 7 | 8 | 9 | R | H | E |
|---|---|---|---|---|---|---|---|---|---|---|---|---|
| Puerto Rico | 2 | 0 | 1 | 0 | 1 | 0 | 1 | 0 | 4 | 9 | 13 | 1 |
| Mexico | 1 | 0 | 0 | 0 | 0 | 0 | 3 | 0 | 0 | 4 | 7 | 1 |
WP: Jorge López (1−0) LP: Miguel González (0−1); Home runs: PUR: Francisco Lindor 2 (2), Javier Báez (1); MEX: None; Attendance: 15,647 (97.8%); Umpires: HP − Doug Eddings, 1B − Winfried Berkvens, 2B − Quinn Wolcott, 3B − Michael Ulloa; Boxscore

=== Puerto Rico 9, Italy 3 ===
March 12, 13:30 at Estadio Charros de Jalisco
| Team | 1 | 2 | 3 | 4 | 5 | 6 | 7 | 8 | 9 | R | H | E |
|---|---|---|---|---|---|---|---|---|---|---|---|---|
| Italy | 2 | 1 | 0 | 0 | 0 | 0 | 0 | 0 | 0 | 3 | 3 | 0 |
| Puerto Rico | 1 | 2 | 1 | 3 | 2 | 0 | 0 | 0 | X | 9 | 13 | 0 |
WP: José Berríos (1−0) LP: Luis Lugo (0−1); Home runs: ITA: John Andreoli (2), Drew Butera (2); PUR: Carlos Correa (2); Attendance: 11,924 (74.5%); Umpires: HP − Dan Bellino, 1B − Santos Castillo, 2B − Doug Eddings, 3B − Winfried Berkvens; Boxscore

=== Mexico 11, Venezuela 9 ===
March 12, 20:00 at Estadio Charros de Jalisco
| Team | 1 | 2 | 3 | 4 | 5 | 6 | 7 | 8 | 9 | R | H | E |
|---|---|---|---|---|---|---|---|---|---|---|---|---|
| Mexico | 0 | 5 | 0 | 0 | 3 | 1 | 2 | 0 | 0 | 11 | 12 | 0 |
| Venezuela | 0 | 0 | 1 | 0 | 3 | 2 | 3 | 0 | 0 | 9 | 15 | 0 |
WP: Luis Mendoza (1−0) LP: Yusmeiro Petit (0−1) Sv: Roberto Osuna (1); Home runs: MEX: Esteban Quiroz (2), Brandon Laird (1); VEN: Víctor Martínez (1); Attendance: 15,489 (96.8%); Umpires: HP − Quinn Wolcott, 1B − Doug Eddings, 2B − Michael Ulloa, 3B − Santos Castillo; Boxscore

=== Tiebreaker game − Venezuela 4, Italy 3 ===
March 13, 19:00 at Estadio Charros de Jalisco
| Team | 1 | 2 | 3 | 4 | 5 | 6 | 7 | 8 | 9 | R | H | E |
|---|---|---|---|---|---|---|---|---|---|---|---|---|
| Venezuela | 0 | 0 | 0 | 0 | 0 | 1 | 0 | 0 | 3 | 4 | 5 | 0 |
| Italy | 1 | 0 | 0 | 0 | 0 | 0 | 1 | 0 | 1 | 3 | 7 | 1 |
WP: José Alvarado (1−0) LP: Mike DeMark (0−1) Sv: Francisco Rodríguez (1); Home runs: VEN: Miguel Cabrera (1); ITA: John Andreoli (3), Alex Liddi (2); Attendance: 1,783 (11.1%); Umpires: HP − Doug Eddings, 1B − Dan Bellino, 2B − Santos Castillo, 3B − Michael Ulloa; Boxscore
