= Erasmo Ramírez (right-handed pitcher) =

Nicaraguan baseball player (born 1990)

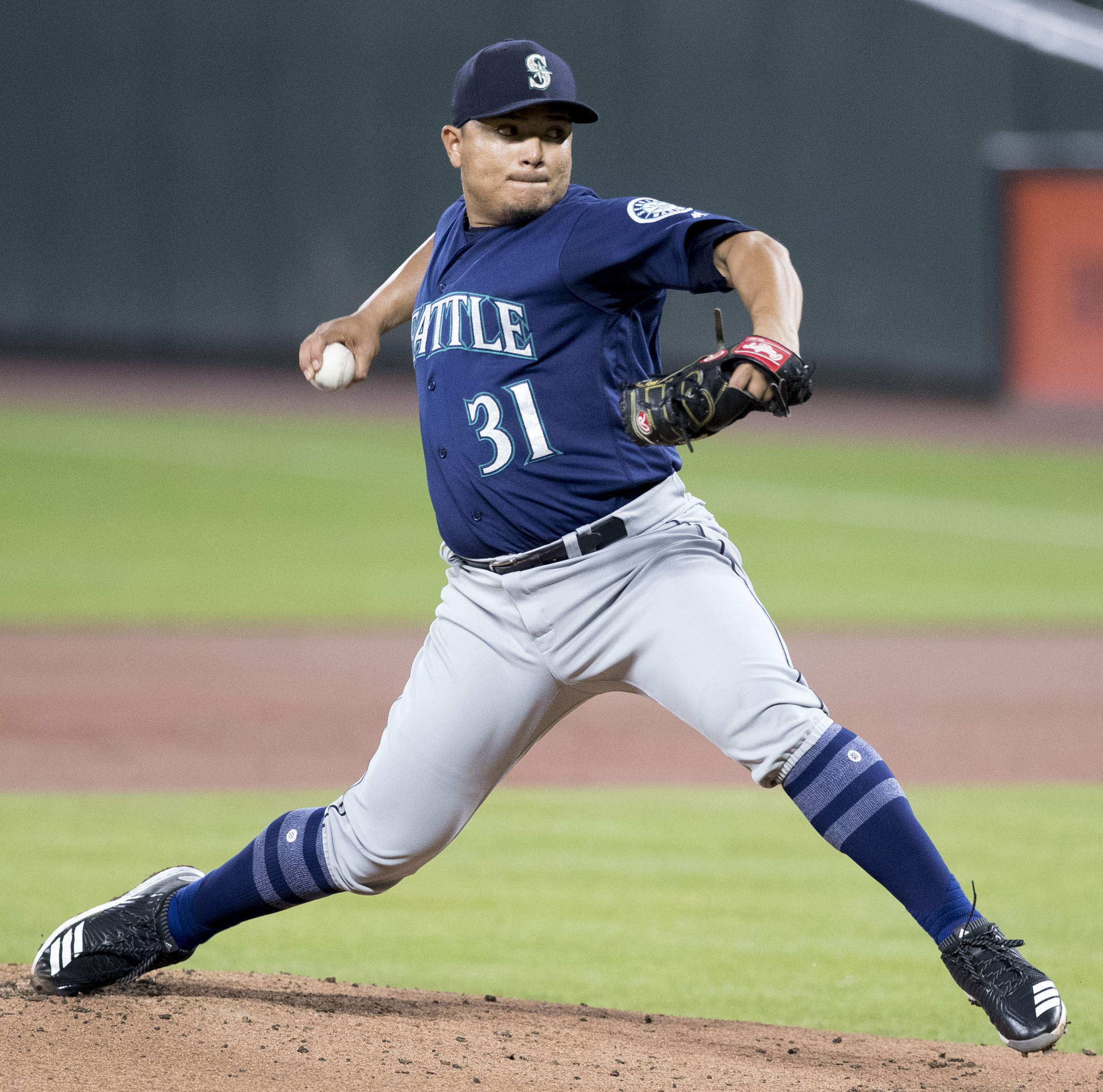
- Ramírez with the Seattle Mariners in 2017

Gary SouthShore RailCats – No. 37
- Pitcher
- Born: May 2, 1990 (age 36); Rivas, Nicaragua
- Bats: Right Throws: Right

MLB debut
- April 9, 2012, for the Seattle Mariners

MLB statistics (through 2025 season)
- Win–loss record: 43–46
- Earned run average: 4.34
- Strikeouts: 650
- Stats at Baseball Reference

Teams
- Seattle Mariners (2012–2014); Tampa Bay Rays (2015–2017); Seattle Mariners (2017–2018); Boston Red Sox (2019); New York Mets (2020); Detroit Tigers (2021); Washington Nationals (2022–2023); Tampa Bay Rays (2023–2024); Minnesota Twins (2025)

Erasmo José Ramírez Olivera (born May 2, 1990) is a Nicaraguan professional baseball pitcher for the Gary SouthShore RailCats of the American Association of Professional Baseball. He has previously played in Major League Baseball (MLB) for the Seattle Mariners, Tampa Bay Rays, Boston Red Sox, New York Mets, Detroit Tigers, Washington Nationals, and Minnesota Twins. Listed at 5 feet 10 inches (1.78 m) and 215 pounds (98 kg), he both throws and bats right-handed. He represents the Nicaraguan national team in international competition.

== Early years ==
At the age of 12, Ramírez left his home in Nicaragua to attend school in San Salvador, El Salvador. The school which he attended, Fundación Educando a un Salvadoreño, was aimed at helping baseball and soccer athletes training in their respective sports, while also offering academic support. From there, Ramírez was discovered by Jorge Bahaia, who introduced him to Seattle Mariners scouts Ubaldo Heredia and Bob Engle. Engle also signed players José López, Ryan Rowland-Smith, and Carlos Triunfel.

== Professional career ==
=== Seattle Mariners ===
On September 1, 2007, Ramírez officially signed with Seattle Mariners. Ramírez began his professional baseball career in 2008 with the rookie-level VSL Mariners of the Venezuelan Summer League. That season, he compiled a 4–1 record with a 2.86 earned run average (ERA), one complete game, and 46 strikeouts in 13 games, 11 starts. In 2009, Ramírez continued playing with the VSL Mariners. Before the season, the Seattle Mariners minor league director Pedro Grifol compared Ramírez to Major League Baseball pitcher Doug Fister. That season, Ramírez compiled an 11–1 record with a 0.51 ERA, and 80 strikeouts in 14 games, 13 starts. He led the Venezuelan Summer League in wins, ERA, innings pitched (88), and strikeouts. After the season, the Seattle Mariners named Ramírez as the pitcher of the year in their minor league organization. He participated in the Mariners instructional league in Arizona after the 2009 season.

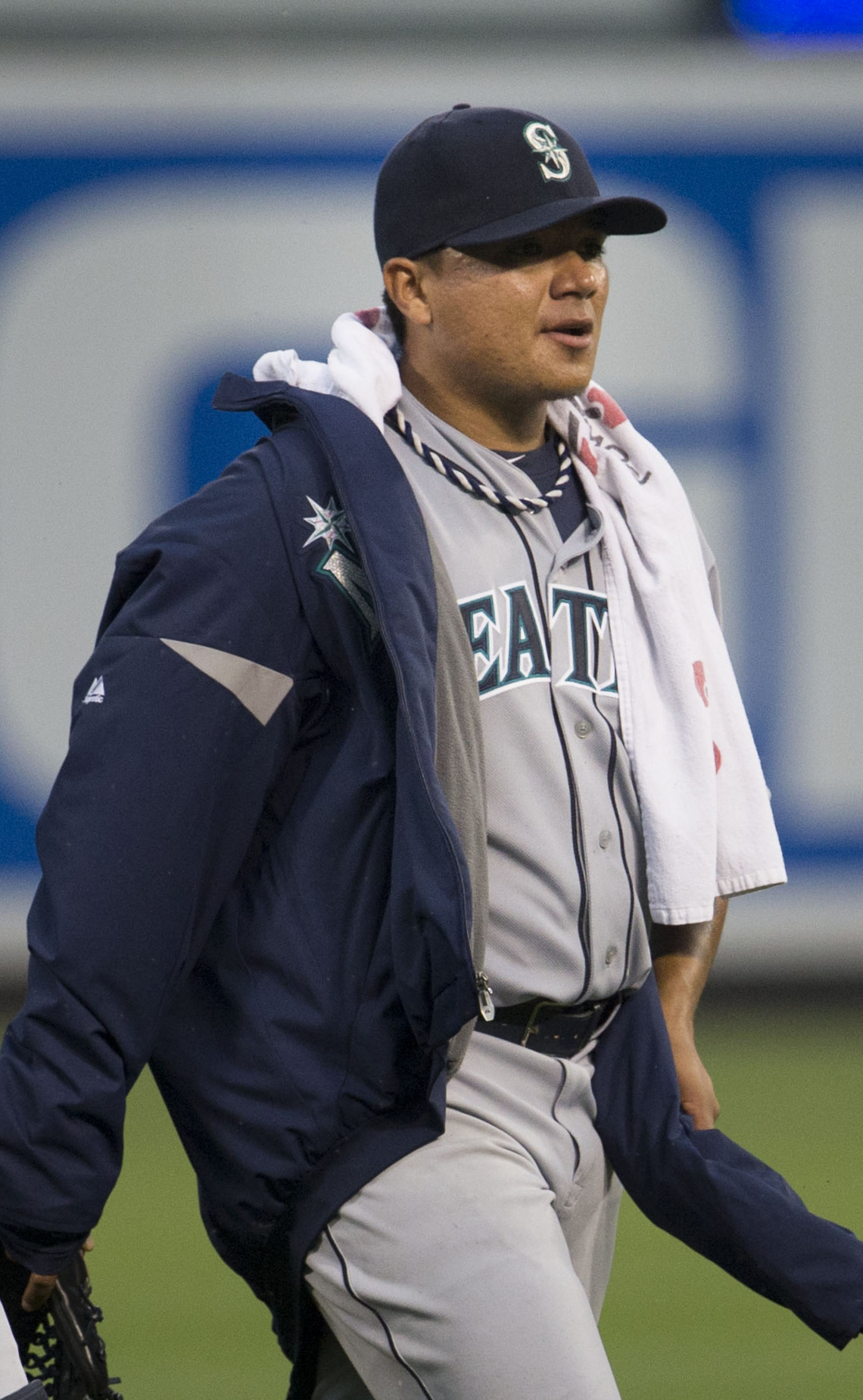
Ramírez with the Seattle Mariners in 2013

Ramírez spent the early part of the 2010 season in extended spring training with the Seattle Mariners. He was assigned to the Single-A Clinton LumberKings in early-April. On the season, Ramírez was both a Midwest League mid-season all-star and a post-season all-star. He went 10–4 with a 2.97 ERA, one complete game, one save, and 117 strikeouts in 26 games, 23 starts with Clinton.

After the season, Ramírez was named the LumberKings Pitcher of the Year. At the end of the year, Erasmo was awarded in Nicaragua Athlete of the Year by the ACDN (Nicaraguan Association of Sport Journalists) over Everth Cabrera.

In 2013, Ramírez was going to join the Mariners starting roster before the start of the regular season before injuring his triceps. He eventually spent time in Triple–A before making his debut of the season with the Mariners on July 11 against the Boston Red Sox, but allowed seven runs in 4 2/3 innings. The following day, Ramírez was sent down to the Everett AquaSox in order to allow him to stay on a regular rotation during the Major League All-Star break, and started July 17's game against the Vancouver Canadians, giving up two runs on six hits while striking out ten in 5 1/3 innings as the AquaSox won 7-6.

=== Tampa Bay Rays ===
On March 31, 2015, Ramírez was traded to the Tampa Bay Rays for Mike Montgomery. Ramírez struggled in his first month with the Rays, posting an 0-1 record with a 12.71 ERA. But, when he came back in mid-May from the Durham Bulls he was better for the rotation and team, putting up great numbers for the rest of the season. On September 14 against the New York Yankees he went 7 2/3 hitless innings. Ramírez finished the season 11-5 with a 3.75 ERA in 163 1/3 innings pitched.

In 2016, Ramírez made a more permanent switch to the bullpen, specifically in long relief situations. Ramírez ended the season making appearances in 64 games, throwing 90 2/3 innings posting a 3.77 ERA.

In 2017, Ramírez started as an important reliever out of the bullpen, but when struggling youngster Blake Snell was demoted, Ramírez was put in the starting rotation. On May 28, Ramírez was forced to come in and get a save in a fifteen inning affair with the Minnesota Twins. On May 29, Ramírez became the first pitcher since Dennis Martinez, Ramírez's childhood idol, to start the next game after receiving a save.

=== Seattle Mariners (second stint) ===
On July 28, 2017, the Rays traded Ramírez back to the Seattle Mariners for Steve Cishek. On August 23, Ramírez went 2-for-3 at the plate in a game against the Atlanta Braves, recording his first MLB hit and RBI. On May 1, 2018, he was placed on the disabled list. He ended the season sporting a career worst 6.50 ERA in 10 starts. Nevertheless, on October 29, 2018, Ramírez was selected to play in the 2018 MLB Japan All-Star Series.

In November 2018, Ramírez elected to become a free agent after clearing waivers and being outrighted off the Mariners' 40-man roster.

=== Boston Red Sox ===
On December 18, 2018, Ramírez signed a minor league contract with the Boston Red Sox. He started the 2019 season with the Triple-A Pawtucket Red Sox. On April 16, his contract was selected by Boston, and he made his Red Sox debut the same day, allowing four runs in three innings of relief during an 8–0 loss to the Yankees in New York. He was designated for assignment on April 19, and sent outright back to Pawtucket on April 21. With Pawtucket during the 2019 season, Ramírez was 6–8 with a 4.74 ERA and 95 strikeouts in 125 1/3 innings. He elected free agency on October 1.

=== New York Mets ===
On January 26, 2020, Ramírez signed a minor league deal with the New York Mets. He was called up to the Mets on September 4, 2020. Ramírez pitched in 6 games in 2020, notching a 0.63 ERA and 9 strikeouts over 14.1 innings pitched. Ramírez became a free agent on October 28, 2020.

=== Detroit Tigers ===
On January 19, 2021, Ramírez signed a minor league contract with the Detroit Tigers, with an invitation to spring training. On May 7, 2021, Ramírez was selected to the active roster. Ramírez appeared in 17 games for the Tigers, recording a 1-1 record with a 5.74 ERA with 20 strikeouts. On August 27, 2021, Ramírez was designated for assignment by the Tigers. On August 28, he was released by the Tigers.

=== Washington Nationals ===
On March 13, 2022, Ramírez signed a minor league contract with the Washington Nationals. Ramírez had a 4-2 record and a 2.92 ERA for the Nationals in 2022, starting two games and appearing in relief in 58 games.

On December 21, 2022, Ramírez signed a contract worth $1 million for the 2023 season with up to $1 million available in performance bonuses. In 23 appearances for Washington, Ramírez struggled to a 6.33 ERA with only 13 strikeouts in 27.0 innings pitched. On June 7, 2023, Ramírez was designated for assignment by Washington after Cory Abbott was recalled from Triple–A. He cleared waivers and was released on June 9.

=== Tampa Bay Rays (second stint) ===
On June 12, 2023, Ramírez signed a minor league contract with the Tampa Bay Rays organization and was assigned to the Triple–A Durham Bulls. His contract was selected to the 40–man roster on July 30. In 15 games for Tampa Bay, he struggled to a 6.48 ERA with 30 strikeouts in 33 1/3 innings pitched. On September 30, Ramírez was designated for assignment by Tampa Bay. He cleared waivers and was sent outright to Triple–A Durham on October 2. On October 13, Ramírez elected free agency.

Ramírez re-signed with the Rays on a minor league contract on December 6, and began the 2024 season with Triple–A Durham. Ramírez was selected to the major league roster on April 20, 2024. In 11 games for the Rays, he compiled a 4.50 ERA with 9 strikeouts across 16 innings. On May 22, Ramírez was designated for assignment by Tampa Bay, and was sent outright to Durham on May 24 after clearing waivers. On August 26, the Rays called Ramírez back up to the major leagues. He was designated for assignment again on August 31. Ramírez cleared waivers and was sent outright to Durham on September 3. He elected free agency on October 4.

=== Minnesota Twins ===
On February 15, 2025, Ramírez signed a minor league contract with the Minnesota Twins. On March 8, it was announced that Ramírez would "miss significant time" due to tears in his teres minor muscle and lat muscle. Upon returning, he made 10 appearances split between the rookie-level Florida Complex League Twins and Triple-A St. Paul Saints. On August 1, the Twins selected Ramírez's contract, adding him to their active roster. In nine appearances for Minnesota, he recorded a 2.45 ERA with five strikeouts and one save over 11 innings of work. Ramírez was designated for assignment by the Twins on August 24. He cleared waivers and was sent outright to Triple-A St. Paul on August 26. On October 10, Ramírez elected free agency.

=== Algodoneros de Unión Laguna ===
On April 3, 2026, Ramírez signed with the Algodoneros de Unión Laguna of the Mexican League. In one start for the Algodoneros, Ramírez threw five innings and gave up one earned run while striking out two batters.

=== Colorado Rockies ===
On May 3, 2026, Ramirez's contract was purchased by the Colorado Rockies organization. He made 10 appearances (including seven starts) for the Triple-A Albuquerque Isotopes, but struggled to a 1-3 record and 11.90 ERA with 19 strikeouts over 31 innings of work. Ramírez was released by the Rockies organization on June 26.

=== Gary SouthShore RailCats ===
On July 17, 2026, Ramírez signed with the Gary SouthShore RailCats of the American Association of Professional Baseball.

== International career ==
Ramírez played for the Nicaraguan national baseball team in the 2013 World Baseball Classic qualifiers. Over 1.2 innings pitched, he gave up four hits, two walks, and one hit-by-pitch in what would be an 8–1 drubbing against Colombia. He was not included in the squad for the 2017 WBC qualifiers.

Ramírez participated with the Nicaraguan team in the 2023 World Baseball Classic, the country's first ever appearance at a WBC tournament. In the tournament, he pitched to a 2.45 ERA over 3.2 innings. Ramírez gave up several RBI singles in relief against Puerto Rico, yielding three runs in a 9–1 loss (though all but one of the runners were inherited). He then started Nicaragua's final game against Venezuela, pitching three scoreless innings, outlasting Eduardo Rodriguez and striking out Ronald Acuña Jr.
