= 2017 World Baseball Classic – Qualifier 2 =

Qualifier 2 of the Qualifying Round of the 2017 World Baseball Classic was held at Estadio B'Air, Mexicali, Mexico, from March 17 to 20, 2016.

Qualifier 2 was a modified double-elimination tournament. The winners for the first games matched up in the second game, while the losers faced each other in an elimination game. The winners of the elimination game then played the losers of the non-elimination game in another elimination game. The remaining two teams then played each other to determine the winners of the Qualifier 2.

== Bracket ==
Preliminaries
–	Germany	4
–	Nicaragua	5
–	Czech Republic	1
–	Mexico	2
Lower round 1
L1	Germany	3
L2	Czech Republic	15

Semifinals
W1	Nicaragua	0
W2	Mexico	11
Lower final
W3	Czech Republic	6
L4	Nicaragua	7

Qualifier
W4	Mexico	12
W5	Nicaragua	1

== Results ==
- All times are Pacific Daylight Time (UTC−07:00).

=== Nicaragua 5, Germany 4 ===
March 17 12:30 at Estadio B'Air (F/10)
Team	1	2	3	4	5	6	7	8	9	10	R	H	E
Germany	0	0	0	0	0	3	0	0	0	1	4	10	0
Nicaragua	0	2	0	0	0	0	0	0	1	2	5	11	1
WP: Carlos A. Gonzalez (1−0) LP: Enorbel Marquez (0−1); Home runs: GER: Bruce Maxwell (1); NCA: None; Attendance: 3,773 (19.3%); Umpires: HP − Cuti Suarez, 1B − Travis Eggert, 2B − Alberto Ruiz, 3B − Maikol Tibabijo; Notes: One out when winning run scored. Boxscore

=== Mexico 2, Czech Republic 1 ===
March 17 19:30 at Estadio B'Air
Team	1	2	3	4	5	6	7	8	9	R	H	E
Czech Republic	0	0	0	0	0	0	0	1	0	1	4	0
Mexico	2	0	0	0	0	0	0	0	X	2	4	1
WP: Alejandro Soto (1−0) LP: Marek Červenka (0−1) Sv: Óliver Pérez (1); Home runs: CZE: Matej Hejma (1); MEX: None; Attendance: 14,711 (75.4%); Umpires: HP − Carlos Rey, 1B − Alberto Ruiz, 2B − Travis Eggert, 3B − Maikol Tibabijo; Boxscore

=== Czech Republic 15, Germany 3 ===
March 18 12:30 at Estadio B'Air (F/8)
Team	1	2	3	4	5	6	7	8	9	R	H	E
Czech Republic	0	0	4	0	1	0	3	7	X	15	13	1
Germany	1	0	0	0	0	1	0	1	X	3	10	2
WP: John Straka (1−0) LP: Jan-Niclas Stoecklin (0−1); Home runs: CZE: Martin Červenka (1); GER: None; Attendance: 2,187 (11.2%); Umpires: HP − Maikol Tibabijo, 1B − Cuti Suarez, 2B − Alberto Ruiz, 3B − Carlos Torres; Notes: Completed early due to 10–run mercy rule after 8 innings. Boxscore

=== Mexico 11, Nicaragua 0 ===
March 18 19:30 at Estadio B'Air (F/7)
Team	1	2	3	4	5	6	7	8	9	R	H	E
Nicaragua	0	0	0	0	0	0	0	X	X	0	4	3
Mexico	2	2	0	5	0	2	X	X	X	11	5	0
WP: Stephen Landazuri (1−0) LP: Carlos Teller (0−1); Attendance: 12,715 (65.2%); Umpires: HP − Travis Eggert, 1B − Carlos Torres, 2B − Cuti Suarez, 3B − Carlos Rey; Notes: Completed early due to 10–run mercy rule after 7 innings. Boxscore

=== Nicaragua 7, Czech Republic 6 ===
March 19 18:00 at Estadio B'Air (F/11)
Team	1	2	3	4	5	6	7	8	9	10	11	R	H	E
Nicaragua	0	0	0	0	2	0	0	2	0	0	3	7	8	0
Czech Republic	3	0	0	0	1	0	0	0	0	0	2	6	7	4
WP: Jonathan Loaisiga (1−0) LP: Martin Schneider (0−1) Sv: Jose Saenz (1); Home runs: NCA: None; CZE: Jakub Malik (1); Attendance: 6,558 (33.6%); Umpires: HP − Alberto Ruiz, 1B − Carlos Rey, 2B − Carlos Torres, 3B − Cuti Suarez; Notes: Extra inning rule was used in 11th inning. Boxscore

=== Mexico 12, Nicaragua 1 ===
March 20 19:00 at Estadio B'Air (F/7)
Team	1	2	3	4	5	6	7	8	9	R	H	E
Nicaragua	0	0	0	0	0	0	1	X	X	1	7	2
Mexico	0	6	0	0	5	1	X	X	X	12	11	0
WP: Daniel Rodríguez (1−0) LP: Fidencio Flores (0−1); Home runs: NCA: None; MEX: Leo Heras (1), Esteban Quiroz (1); Attendance: 16,521 (84.7%); Umpires: HP − Carlos Torres, 1B − Maikol Tibabijo, 2B − Travis Eggert, 3B − Carlos Rey; Notes: Completed early due to 10–run mercy rule after 7 innings. Boxscore
