= Mike DeMark =

American baseball player (born 1983)

- Pitcher
- Born: May 20, 1983 (age 42); Greensburg, Pennsylvania, U.S.
- Batted: Right Threw: Right

CPBL debut
- March 26, 2017, for the Uni-President Lions

Last CPBL appearance
- June 10, 2017, for the Uni-President Lions

CPBL statistics
- Win–loss record: 1–2
- Earned run average: 3.00
- Strikeouts: 16
- Stats at Baseball Reference

Teams
- Uni-President Lions (2017)

Michael Moise DeMark (born May 20, 1983) is an American former professional baseball pitcher. He played in the Chinese Professional Baseball League (CPBL) for the Uni-President Lions.

== Career ==
A graduate of Penn-Trafford High School, he played college baseball at Marietta College. He played in three Major League Baseball (MLB) organizations: the San Diego Padres, Arizona Diamondbacks, and Oakland Athletics.

DeMark was selected to play in the Arizona Fall League, a league established to showcase future Major League Stars. He was a mid-season Texas League all-star in 2009 while playing for the San Antonio Missions.

DeMark holds individual records for the York Revolution for most Saves in a single season as well as lowest ERA recorded in a single season while serving as the team's closer in 2016. After that season, DeMark signed with the Uni-President 7-Eleven Lions for the 2017 season. In 21 appearances for the Lions, he logged a 1-2 record and 3.00 ERA with 16 strikeouts over 21 innings of work. On June 5, 2017, DeMark was released by the team following the signing of Terance Marin.

DeMark was selected as a member of the Italy national baseball team at the 2017 World Baseball Classic. As of 2018, DeMark was selected to enter the Marietta College Hall of Fame.
