= 2018 Caribbean Series =

2018 baseball tournament

The 2018 Caribbean Series (Serie del Caribe) was the 60th edition of the international competition featuring the champions of the Cuban National Series, Dominican Professional Baseball League, Mexican Pacific League, Puerto Rican Professional Baseball League, and Venezuelan Professional Baseball League. It took place from February 2 to 8, 2018 at the Estadio Panamericano in Guadalajara, Mexico. Criollos de Caguas of Puerto Rico won the tournament.

The series was originally set to be hosted in Barquisimeto, Venezuela, but due to the socioeconomic crisis at the time it had to be moved to Mexico for a second consecutive year.

== Stadium ==
The Estadio Panamericano is located in Zapopan, within the Guadalajara Metropolitan Area. It is currently home to the Charros de Jalisco of the Mexican Pacific League, who have played there since their entry to the league for the 2014-15 season.

== Format ==
The Preliminary Round consisted of a ten-game round robin, after which the top 4 teams advanced to the Semifinal Round (1st vs. 4th, 2nd vs. 3rd). The winners of the semifinal games then squared off in the Final.

== Participating teams ==
Team	Means of qualification
(Cuba) Alazanes de Granma	Winners of the 2017–18 Cuban National Series
(Mexico) Tomateros de Culiacán	Winners of the 2017–18 Mexican Pacific League
(Puerto Rico) Criollos de Caguas	Winners of the 2017–18 Puerto Rican Professional Baseball League
(Dominican Republic) Águilas Cibaeñas	Winners of the 2017–18 Dominican Professional Baseball League
(Venezuela) Caribes de Anzoátegui	Winners of the 2017–18 Venezuelan Professional Baseball League

== Preliminary round ==
Pos	Team	Pld	W	L	RF	RA	RD	PCT	GB	Qualification
1	(Cuba) Alazanes de Granma	4	3	1	18	18	0	.750	—	Advance to knockout stage
2	(Venezuela) Caribes de Anzoátegui	4	2	2	32	26	+6	.500	1	Advance to knockout stage
3	(Puerto Rico) Criollos de Caguas	4	2	2	25	23	+2	.500	1	Advance to knockout stage
4	(Dominican Republic) Águilas Cibaeñas	4	2	2	18	27	−9	.500	1	Advance to knockout stage
5	(Mexico) Tomateros de Culiacán (H)	4	1	3	20	19	+1	.250	2	Eliminated

Source: MLB
Rules for classification: 1) Wins; 2) Head-to-head matches; 3) Team quality balance; 4) Batting average; 5) Drawing of lots.
(H) Hosts

Time zone: Mexican Central Time (UTC–6)

Date	Time	Away	Result	Home	Stadium
February 2	13:00	Caribes de Anzoátegui (Venezuela)	4–6	(Cuba) Alazanes de Granma	Estadio Panamericano
February 2	20:00	Criollos de Caguas (Puerto Rico)	7–4	(Mexico) Tomateros de Culiacán	Estadio Panamericano
February 3	14:00	Águilas Cibaeñas (Dominican Republic)	4–15	(Venezuela) Caribes de Anzoátegui	Estadio Panamericano
February 3	20:00	Tomateros de Culiacán (Mexico)	4–5	(Cuba) Alazanes de Granma	Estadio Panamericano
February 4	14:00	Águilas Cibaeñas (Dominican Republic)	6–3	(Puerto Rico) Criollos de Caguas	Estadio Panamericano
February 4	20:00	Caribes de Anzoátegui (Venezuela)	6–4	(Mexico) Tomateros de Culiacán	Estadio Panamericano
February 5	14:00	Criollos de Caguas (Puerto Rico)	12–7	(Venezuela) Caribes de Anzoátegui	Estadio Panamericano
February 5	20:00	Alazanes de Granma (Cuba)	1–7	(Dominican Republic) Águilas Cibaeñas	Estadio Panamericano
February 6	14:00	Alazanes de Granma (Cuba)	6–3	(Puerto Rico) Criollos de Caguas	Estadio Panamericano
February 6	20:00	Tomateros de Culiacán (Mexico)	8–1	(Dominican Republic) Águilas Cibaeñas	Estadio Panamericano

== Knockout stage ==
Semi-finals
4	(Dominican Republic) Águilas Cibaeñas	7
1	(Cuba) Alazanes de Granma	4
3	(Puerto Rico) Criollos de Caguas	6
2	(Venezuela) Caribes de Anzoátegui	5

Final
(Dominican Republic) Águilas Cibaeñas	4
(Puerto Rico) Criollos de Caguas	9

=== Semi-finals ===
Date	Time	Away	Result	Home	Stadium
February 7	14:00	Criollos de Caguas (Puerto Rico)	6–5	(Venezuela) Caribes de Anzoátegui	Estadio Panamericano
February 7	20:00	Águilas Cibaeñas (Dominican Republic)	7–4	(Cuba) Alazanes de Granma	Estadio Panamericano

=== Final ===
February 8, 2018 20:00 at Estadio Panamericano in Guadalajara, Mexico
Team	1	2	3	4	5	6	7	8	9	R	H	E
(Dominican Republic) Águilas Cibaeñas	2	0	1	1	0	0	0	0	0	4	7	0
(Puerto Rico) Criollos de Caguas	0	0	1	0	0	0	5	3	X	9	9	2
