= Estadio Panamericano de Béisbol =

Baseball and athletics stadium in Zapopan, Jalisco

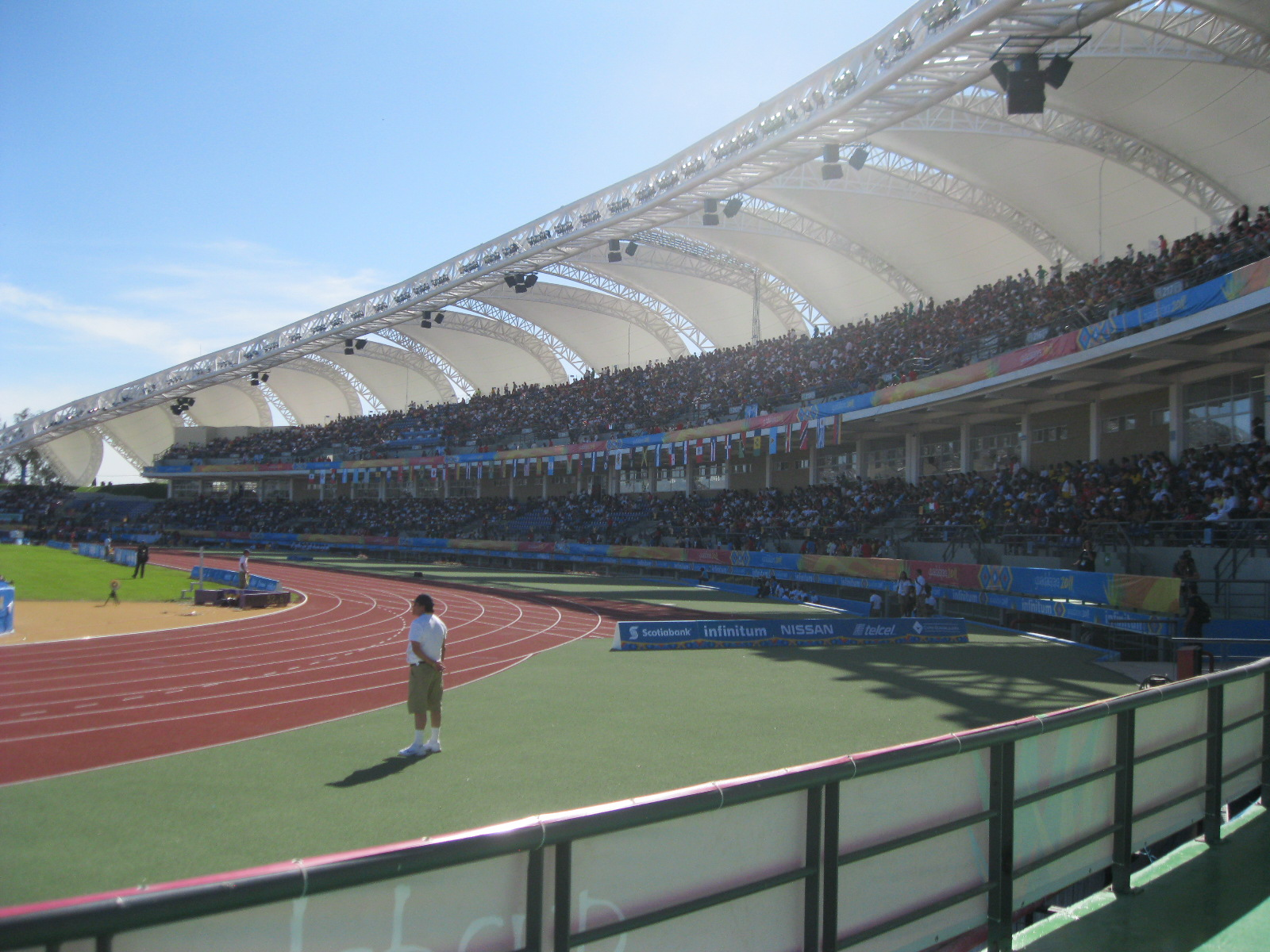
- Interactive map of Estadio Panamericano de Béisbol
- Former names: Estadio Telmex de Atletismo
- Location: Zapopan, Jalisco, Mexico
- Coordinates: 20°43′38.5″N 103°22′53.5″W
- Capacity: 16,500 (baseball); 8,500 (track and field)
- Surface: UBU Sports S5 - Manufactured by Turf Nation

Construction
- Opened: October 19, 2011
- Renovated: 2026 Changed in Baseball to the Athletics stadium
- Cost: $28 million U.S. Dollars

Tenants
- Charros de Jalisco (LMP, LMB) (2014–present); Mariachis de Guadalajara (LMB) (2021–2023); 2011 Pan American Games; 2017 World Baseball Classic; 2018 Caribbean Series; 2019 WBSC Premier12; 2026 Caribbean Series

The Estadio Panamericano de Béisbol, formerly known as Estadio Telmex de Atletismo and popularly known as Estadio de Béisbol Charros de Jalisco, is a baseball and athletics stadium located in Zapopan, near Guadalajara, Jalisco. It was built for the 2011 Pan American Games at substantial cost. It opened in 2011 and received official certification from the International Association of Athletics Federations just days before the start of the Pan American Games. It will have a permanent capacity of 8,000, but will be increased to 15,000 during the games. It has an eight-lane tartan track as well as an adjoining warm-up track.

During the 2011 Pan American Games, it hosted the athletics competition. After the games, it was used as a concert venue and to host sporting competitions including baseball. On September 14, 2014, the Mexican Pacific League's Charros de Jalisco bought the stadium. The stadium hosted Pool D of the first round of the 2017 World Baseball Classic.

The stadium was also used by the Mexican Baseball League team Mariachis de Guadalajara since 2021 until 2023.

== See also ==
- Athletics at the 2011 Pan American Games
