= Esteban Quiroz =

Mexican baseball player (born 1992)

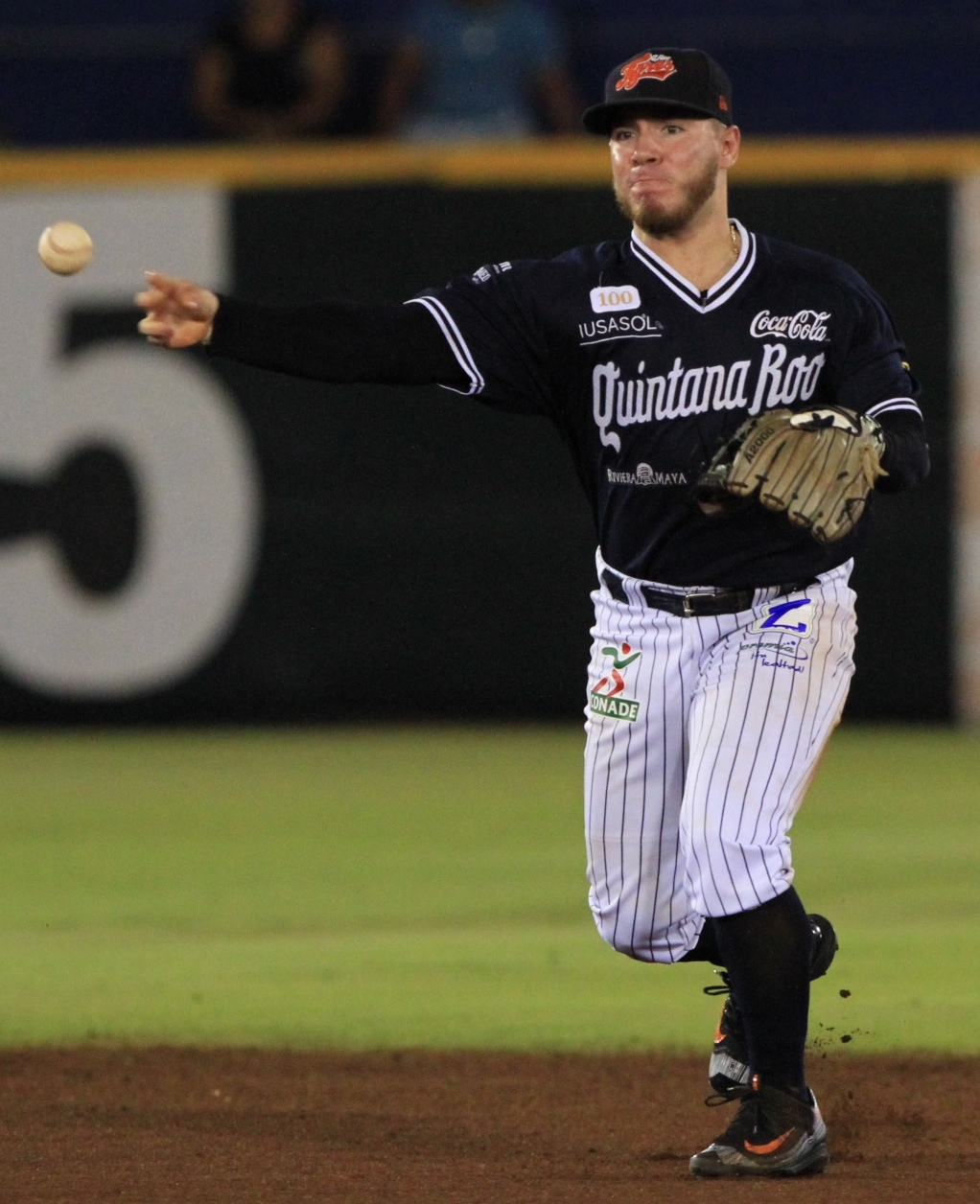
- Quiroz with Tigres de Quintana Roo in 2016

Bravos de León – No. 88
- Infielder
- Born: February 17, 1992 (age 34); Ciudad Obregón, Sonora, Mexico
- Bats: Left Throws: Right

MLB debut
- September 17, 2022, for the Chicago Cubs

MLB statistics (through 2022 season)
- Batting average: .275
- Home runs: 0
- Runs batted in: 3
- Stats at Baseball Reference

Teams
- Chicago Cubs (2022)
Medals
Men's baseball
Representing Mexico
2019 WBSC Premier12
Bronze medal – third place	2019 Tokyo	National team

Jesús Esteban Quiroz Ortiz (born February 17, 1992) is a Mexican professional baseball infielder for the Bravos de León of the Mexican League. He has previously played in Major League Baseball (MLB) for the Chicago Cubs. He plays on the Mexico national baseball team.

== Career ==
=== Tigres de Quintana Roo ===
Quiroz made his professional debut for the Tigres de Quintana Roo of the Mexican Baseball League in 2011. He played primarily at shortstop and second base.

=== Leones de Yucatan ===
The Tigres traded Quiroz to the Leones de Yucatan before the 2017 season.

Quiroz played for the Mexico national baseball team in the 2017 World Baseball Classic, and hit a leadoff home run for Mexico in the first game of Pool D. He went 4-for-6 with two home runs (one of them off major leaguer Yusmeiro Petit) and a double. Following his participation in the WBC, Quiroz batted .293/.428/.488/.916 in for the Leones de Yucatán of the Mexican League. Quiroz registered more walks (64) than strikeouts (41) in 358 plate appearances.

=== Boston Red Sox ===
On November 22, 2017, Quiroz signed a minor league contract with the Boston Red Sox. He started the 2018 season with the Double-A Portland Sea Dogs, his first time playing professional baseball outside of Mexico. He played in 15 games before he was placed on the disabled list in late April for surgery for a sports hernia. On August 10, he was sent on a rehabilitation assignment with the Gulf Coast League Red Sox, then activated by Portland on August 24. Between the two teams he batted .283/.406/.547 in 106 at bats.

=== San Diego Padres ===
The Red Sox traded Quiroz to the San Diego Padres in exchange for pitcher Colten Brewer on November 20, 2018. Quiroz spent the 2019 season with the Triple-A El Paso Chihuahuas, playing primarily second base, hitting .271/.384/.539/.923 with 19 home runs and 66 RBI.

=== Tampa Bay Rays ===
On March 26, 2020, the Padres traded Quiroz to the Tampa Bay Rays as the player to be named later in the December 2019 trade that sent Tommy Pham and Jake Cronenworth to San Diego in exchange for Hunter Renfroe and Xavier Edwards. The 2020 minor league season was cancelled due to the COVID-19 pandemic, but the Rays invited Quiroz to be one of the 60 players in their training pool. Quiroz played in 68 games in 2021 for the Triple-A Durham Bulls, hitting .268 with 12 home runs and 48 RBI.

=== Chicago Cubs ===
On March 25, 2022, the Rays traded Quiroz to the Chicago Cubs in exchange for Harold Ramírez. Quiroz began the 2022 season with the Triple-A Iowa Cubs. The Cubs promoted him to the major leagues on September 17 and he made his major league debut that day. On September 20, Quiroz collected his first MLB hit, a single off of Miami Marlins starter Pablo López. Quiroz appeared in 14 games for Chicago, hitting .275/.370/.275 with 3 RBI. On November 11, 2022, was removed from the 40-man roster and sent outright to Triple-A Iowa.

=== Philadelphia Phillies ===
On March 23, 2023, Quiroz was traded to the Philadelphia Phillies in exchange for cash considerations. In 96 games for the Triple–A Lehigh Valley IronPigs, he batted .231/.348/.354 with seven home runs, 59 RBI, and seven stolen bases.

Quiroz returned to Lehigh Valley in 2024, playing in 54 contests and hitting .158/.290/.260 with four home runs and 22 RBI. He was released by the Phillies organization on July 14, 2024.

=== Sultanes de Monterrey ===
On February 17, 2025, Quiroz signed with the Sultanes de Monterrey of the Mexican League. Quiroz made 70 appearances for Monterrey, slashing .294/.431/.472 with nine home runs, 45 RBI, and one stolen base.

=== Bravos de León ===
On February 21, 2026, Quiroz was loaned to the Bravos de León of the Mexican League for the 2026 season.
