= Estadio Farmacias Sta. Mónica =

Stadium in Mexicali, Mexico

Coordinates: 32°39′20.65″N 115°26′39.61″W

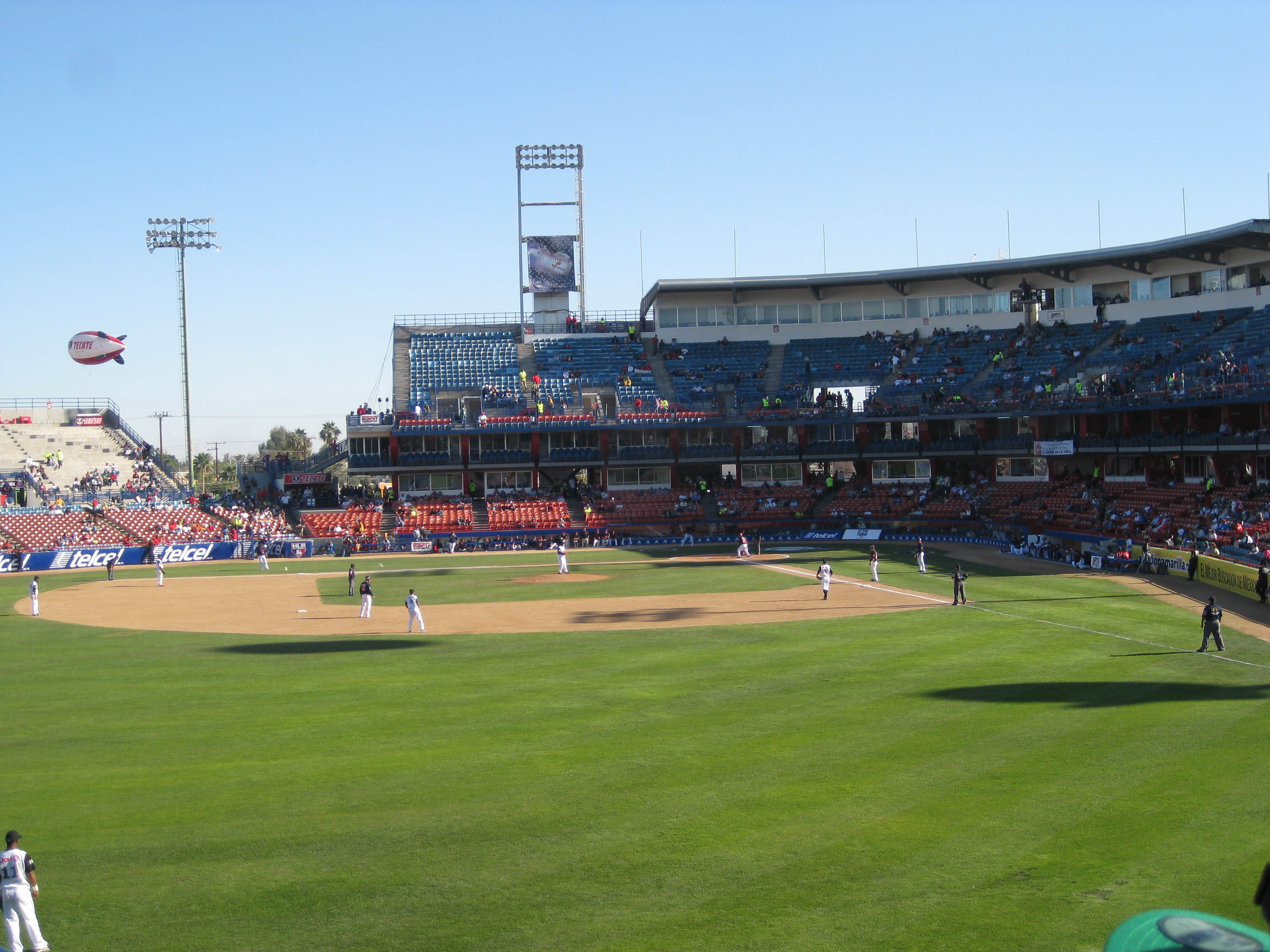
- Interactive map of Estadio Farmacias Sta. Mónica
- Full name: Estadio Farmacias Sta. Mónica
- Former names: Estadio Casas Geo; Estadio B'Air; Estadio Farmacias Sta. Mónica
- Location: Mexicali, Baja California
- Owner: Gobierno del Estado de Baja California
- Operator: Águilas de Mexicali
- Capacity: Concerts: 35,000; Baseball: 20,000
- Field size: Left Field – 100.5 metres (330 ft); Center Field – 122 metres (400 ft); Right Field – 100.5 metres (330 ft)

Construction
- Opened: 1976
- Renovated: 2006 and 2008

Tenant
- Aguilas de Mexicali (LMP) (1976–present)

Estadio Farmacias Sta. Mónica, is a stadium in Mexicali, Mexico. It is primarily used for baseball and has a capacity of 20,000 seated spectators. It serves as the home stadium for the Águilas de Mexicali of the Mexican Pacific League.

== History ==
The stadium hosted the 2009 Caribbean Series, contested by Tigres de Licey, representing Dominican Republic, Venados de Mazatlán, representing Mexico, Leones de Ponce, representing Puerto Rico and Tigres de Aragua, representing Venezuela. The tournament was won by Tigres de Aragua.

The stadium changed its name to the current Estadio Nido de los Águilas ahead of the 2021–22 Mexican Pacific League season.
