= 2017 World Baseball Classic =

International professional baseball competition

Tournament details
- Countries: Japan; Mexico; South Korea; United States
- Dates: March 6–22, 2017
- Teams: 16

Final positions
- Champions: United States (1st title)
- Runners-up: Puerto Rico
- Third place: Japan
- Fourth place: Netherlands

Tournament statistics
- Games played: 40
- Attendance: 973,699 (24,342 per game)

Awards
- MVP: (United States) Marcus Stroman

The 2017 World Baseball Classic (WBC) was an international professional baseball competition, composed of 16 competing nations, held from March 6 to 22, 2017. It was the fourth iteration of the World Baseball Classic. The first-round hosts were Seoul (South Korea), Tokyo (Japan), Miami (Florida, United States), and Zapopan (Mexico). The second-round hosts were Tokyo and San Diego (California, United States), and the championship round was played in Los Angeles (California, United States).

Twelve of the sixteen competing nations qualified based on their performance during the first round of the 2013 tournament; the remaining four nations were the winners of four qualification tournaments that took place in February, March, and September 2016. Two of the four qualifiers, Colombia and Israel, made their first appearance in the WBC, and both secured their positions for the 2023 World Baseball Classic.

The Netherlands, Japan, Puerto Rico, and the United States advanced to the championship round. Defending champion Dominican Republic was eliminated in the second round. The United States defeated Puerto Rico to win the championship game, 8–0. Marcus Stroman was named tournament MVP. He made three starts for the U.S. and posted a 2.35 ERA in 15 1/3 total innings, including 6 shutout innings in the championship game.

== Qualification ==
The top three teams from each pool of the first round of the 2013 World Baseball Classic automatically qualified.

Team	World ranking	Method of qualification	Classic appearance	Previous best position
Canada	8th	2013 World Baseball Classic	4th	First round (2006, 2009, 2013)
China	18th	2013 World Baseball Classic	4th	First round (2006, 2009, 2013)
Chinese Taipei	4th	2013 World Baseball Classic	4th	Second round (2013)
Cuba	5th	2013 World Baseball Classic	4th	Runners-up (2006)
Dominican Republic	13th	2013 World Baseball Classic	4th	Champions (2013)
Italy	10th	2013 World Baseball Classic	4th	Second round (2013)
Japan	1st	2013 World Baseball Classic	4th	Champions (2006, 2009)
Netherlands	9th	2013 World Baseball Classic	4th	Semifinals (2013)
Puerto Rico	12th	2013 World Baseball Classic	4th	Runners-up (2013)
South Korea	3rd	2013 World Baseball Classic	4th	Runners-up (2009)
United States	2nd	2013 World Baseball Classic	4th	Semifinals (2009)
Venezuela	7th	2013 World Baseball Classic	4th	Semifinals (2009)
Australia	11th	Qualifier 1	4th	First round (2006, 2009, 2013)
Mexico	6th	Qualifier 2	4th	Second round (2006, 2009)
Colombia	19th	Qualifier 3	1st	—
Israel	41st	Qualifier 4	1st	—

== Format ==
The first and second rounds of the tournament were played in round-robin format, with each team playing each other team in their pool once, as was the case in 2006. However, in an effort to reduce the likelihood that a team would be eliminated on statistical tiebreakers, the tournament schedule allowed for a seventh game at each pool-play site.

- If there is a two-way tie for first, since both teams advance, there would be no extra game. The team that won the original game between the teams would be declared the pool winner, and the other team the pool runner-up.
- If there is a three-way tie for first (all three teams being 2–1, and the last team 0–3), head-to-head results would not help to break the tie. In this case, statistics would determine the first-place team, and the other two would play to determine the pool runner-up.
- If there is a three-way tie for second (all three teams being 1–2, and the first team 3–0), statistics would determine the top two teams who would then play to determine the pool runner-up. The team ranked worst on the calculation would be eliminated.

In either of the latter cases, the statistics used to rank the tied teams were:

1. Fewest runs allowed per inning of defense in head-to-head games
2. Fewest earned runs allowed per inning of defense in head-to-head games
3. Highest batting average in head-to-head games
4. Drawing of lots

== Venues ==
Six stadiums were used during the main tournament:

Pool A	Pool B & E	Pool C
Seoul, South Korea	Tokyo, Japan	Miami, United States
Gocheok Sky Dome	Tokyo Dome	Marlins Park
Capacity: 16,813	Capacity: 42,000	Capacity: 36,742

Pool D	Pool F	Championship
Zapopan, Mexico	San Diego, United States	Los Angeles, United States
Estadio Charros de Jalisco	Petco Park	Dodger Stadium
Capacity: 16,000	Capacity: 40,162	Capacity: 56,000

== Pools composition ==
Note: Numbers in parentheses indicate positions in the WBSC World Rankings at the time of the tournament.

Pool A	Pool B	Pool C	Pool D
South Korea (3) (hosts)	Japan (1) (hosts)	United States (2) (hosts)	Mexico (6) (hosts)
Chinese Taipei (4)	Australia (11)	Canada (8)	Italy (10)
Netherlands (9)	China (18)	Colombia (19)	Puerto Rico (12)
Israel (41)	Cuba (5)	Dominican Republic (13)	Venezuela (7)

== First round ==
=== Pool A ===
Pos	Team	Pld	W	L	RF	RA	RD	PCT	GB	Qualification
1	Israel	3	3	0	21	10	+11	1.000	—	Advance to second round
2	Netherlands	3	2	1	13	9	+4	.667	1	Advance to second round
3	South Korea (H)	3	1	2	12	15	−3	.333	2	
4	Chinese Taipei	3	0	3	20	32	−12	.000	3	

Rules for classification: Tiebreakers
(H) Hosts

Date	Local time	Road team	Score	Home team	Inn.	Venue	Game duration	Attendance	Boxscore
Mar 6, 2017	18:30	Israel	2–1	South Korea	10	Gocheok Sky Dome	4:11	15,470	Boxscore
Mar 7, 2017	12:00	Israel	15–7	Chinese Taipei		Gocheok Sky Dome	3:54	3,287	Boxscore
Mar 7, 2017	18:30	South Korea	0–5	Netherlands		Gocheok Sky Dome	3:03	15,184	Boxscore
Mar 8, 2017	18:30	Chinese Taipei	5–6	Netherlands		Gocheok Sky Dome	3:21	3,606	Boxscore
Mar 9, 2017	12:00	Netherlands	2–4	Israel		Gocheok Sky Dome	3:12	2,739	Boxscore
Mar 9, 2017	18:30	South Korea	11–8	Chinese Taipei	10	Gocheok Sky Dome	4:40	12,000	Boxscore

Pool A of the First Round of the 2017 World Baseball Classic was held at Gocheok Sky Dome, Seoul, South Korea from March 6 to 10, 2017, between Team Israel, the Netherlands, South Korea, and Taiwan. Pool A was a round-robin tournament. Prior to the start of the tournament, ESPN considered Team Israel, ranked 41st in the world, to be the biggest underdog in the tournament, referring to them as the "Jamaican bobsled team of the WBC".

Team Israel (3–0) and Team Netherlands (2–1) qualified for the second round, in Japan. Israel became the first baseball team to go undefeated in the first round of the WBC's main draw after entering the main draw by winning in a qualifying round. In what NBC reported was thought to be the tallest batter-pitcher matchup in baseball history, the Dutch team's 7-foot-1-inch (2.16 m) Loek van Mil walked Israel's 6-foot-8-inch (2.03 m) Nate Freiman. Israel's catcher, Ryan Lavarnway, was named Pool A MVP, after going 5-for-9 (.556/.692/.889), with four walks, a home run, and three RBIs.

=== Pool B ===
Pos	Team	Pld	W	L	RF	RA	RD	PCT	GB	Qualification
1	Japan (H)	3	3	0	22	8	+14	1.000	—	Advance to second round
2	Cuba	3	2	1	16	14	+2	.667	1	Advance to second round
3	Australia	3	1	2	15	8	+7	.333	2	
4	China	3	0	3	1	24	−23	.000	3	

(H) Hosts

Date	Local time	Road team	Score	Home team	Inn.	Venue	Game duration	Attendance	Boxscore
Mar 7, 2017	19:00	Cuba	6–11	Japan		Tokyo Dome	3:56	44,908	Boxscore
Mar 8, 2017	12:00	China	0–6	Cuba		Tokyo Dome	3:14	39,102	Boxscore
Mar 8, 2017	19:00	Japan	4–1	Australia		Tokyo Dome	3:18	41,408	Boxscore
Mar 9, 2017	19:00	Australia	11–0	China	8	Tokyo Dome	2:59	3,013	Boxscore
Mar 10, 2017	12:00	Australia	3–4	Cuba		Tokyo Dome	3:36	38,050	Boxscore
Mar 10, 2017	19:00	China	1–7	Japan		Tokyo Dome	2:41	40,053	Boxscore

Two-time champion Japan concluded Pool B with a 3–0 record. Cuba defeated Australia to advance to the second round. In the first round, after batting .364, Japanese outfielder Yoshitomo Tsutsugoh was named the Pool B MVP.

=== Pool C ===
Pos	Team	Pld	W	L	RF	RA	RD	PCT	GB	Qualification
1	Dominican Republic	3	3	0	26	10	+16	1.000	—	Advance to second round
2	United States (H)	3	2	1	16	9	+7	.667	1	Advance to second round
3	Colombia	3	1	2	9	14	−5	.333	2	
4	Canada	3	0	3	3	21	−18	.000	3	

Rules for classification: Tiebreakers
(H) Hosts

Date	Local time	Road team	Score	Home team	Inn.	Venue	Game duration	Attendance	Boxscore
Mar 9, 2017	18:00	Canada	2–9	Dominican Republic		Marlins Park	3:14	27,388	Boxscore
Mar 10, 2017	18:00	Colombia	2–3	United States	10	Marlins Park	3:25	22,580	Boxscore
Mar 11, 2017	12:00	Colombia	4–1	Canada		Marlins Park	2:54	17,209	Boxscore
Mar 11, 2017	18:30	United States	5–7	Dominican Republic		Marlins Park	3:38	37,446	Boxscore
Mar 12, 2017	12:30	Dominican Republic	10–3	Colombia	11	Marlins Park	4:44	36,952	Boxscore
Mar 12, 2017	19:00	Canada	0–8	United States		Marlins Park	3:01	22,303	Boxscore

After falling behind 5–0 in the sixth inning, Dominican Republic rallied to defeat the U.S. 7–5 in their second game. On the last day of the pool, Colombia tied their game against Dominican Republic 3–3 in the eighth on a Jorge Alfaro home run, and had a chance to win in the ninth inning, but Oscar Mercado was called out at home trying to score on a sacrifice fly. The game continued into extra innings, where Dominican Republic scored 7 runs in the 11th to win and finish the pool undefeated. The U.S. then took an early lead on Canada, winning 8–0 to claim the second berth in San Diego. Manny Machado of the Dominican Republic was named MVP for the first-round Pool C bracket of the WBC, after batting .357.

=== Pool D ===
Pos	Team	Pld	W	L	RF	RA	RD	PCT	GB	Qualification
1	Puerto Rico	3	3	0	29	7	+22	1.000	—	Advance to second round
2	Venezuela	4	2	2	24	35	−11	.500	1.5	Advance to second round
3	Italy	4	1	3	26	33	−7	.250	2.5	
4	Mexico (H)	3	1	2	24	28	−4	.333	2	

Rules for classification: Tiebreakers
(H) Hosts

Date	Local time	Road team	Score	Home team	Inn.	Venue	Game duration	Attendance	Boxscore
Mar 9, 2017	20:00	Mexico	9–10	Italy		Estadio Charros de Jalisco	3:39	14,296	Boxscore
Mar 10, 2017	20:00	Venezuela	0–11	Puerto Rico	7	Estadio Charros de Jalisco	2:43	14,806	Boxscore
Mar 11, 2017	14:00	Venezuela	11–10	Italy	10	Estadio Charros de Jalisco	4:43	12,187	Boxscore
Mar 11, 2017	20:30	Puerto Rico	9–4	Mexico		Estadio Charros de Jalisco	3:40	15,647	Boxscore
Mar 12, 2017	13:30	Italy	3–9	Puerto Rico		Estadio Charros de Jalisco	2:42	11,924	Boxscore
Mar 12, 2017	20:00	Mexico	11–9	Venezuela		Estadio Charros de Jalisco	4:44	15,489	Boxscore

Tiebreaker game

Date	Local time	Road team	Score	Home team	Inn.	Venue	Game duration	Attendance	Boxscore
Mar 13, 2017	19:00	Venezuela	4–3	Italy		Estadio Charros de Jalisco	3:26	1,783	Boxscore

While Puerto Rico cruised in all three of its games, the fight for the other three places was extremely tight. Italy scored 5 runs in the bottom of the 9th inning to shock Mexico in the first game, then lost an extra-inning slugfest against Venezuela. In the final game, Mexico defeated Venezuela in another slugfest and thought they had scored enough runs to advance on tiebreakers, though this turned out not to be the case.

The first tiebreaker criterion is fewest runs allowed per defensive inning played (RA/IPD) in the games among the tied teams. Although Mexico allowed the fewest runs in those games (19, to Italy's 20, and Venezuela's 21), Mexico played fewer defensive innings (17, while the other two teams had 19) and thus had the highest average RA/IPD (1.117, to Italy's 1.053 and Venezuela's 1.105). This occurred for two reasons: the Italy-Venezuela game went 10 innings, and Mexico was the road team while losing to Italy. In fact, the Mexico-Italy game did go into the bottom of the 9th, in which Italy scored runs that were charged against Mexico but Mexico failed to record an out. There was confusion during and after the Mexico-Venezuela game, with an initial calculation showing that Mexico had advanced. Mexico filed a formal protest of its elimination, but the protest was denied.

As specified in the rules, Mexico was eliminated by the tiebreaker calculation and a tiebreaker game was played between Italy and Venezuela, which Venezuela won with a 9th-inning rally.

According to the rules as announced at the time, Mexico's last-place finish would have required it to participate in a qualifying tournament in order to re-qualify for the 2021 World Baseball Classic. However, MLB announced in 2020 that the field of teams for the 2021 WBC would be expanded, with all 2017 WBC participants qualifying automatically and four new teams coming from qualifying tournaments.

== Second round ==
=== Pool E ===
Pos	Team	Pld	W	L	RF	RA	RD	PCT	GB	Qualification
1	Japan (H)	3	3	0	24	14	+10	1.000	—	Advance to championship round
2	Netherlands	3	2	1	32	11	+21	.667	1	Advance to championship round
3	Israel	3	1	2	9	21	−12	.333	2	
4	Cuba	3	0	3	7	26	−19	.000	3	

Rules for classification: Tiebreakers
(H) Hosts

Date	Local time	Road team	Score	Home team	Inn.	Venue	Game duration	Attendance	Boxscore
Mar 12, 2017	12:00	Cuba	1–4	Israel		Tokyo Dome	3:14	43,153	Boxscore
Mar 12, 2017	19:00	Japan	8–6	Netherlands	11	Tokyo Dome	4:46	44,326	Boxscore
Mar 13, 2017	19:00	Netherlands	12–2	Israel	8	Tokyo Dome	3:04	5,017	Boxscore
Mar 14, 2017	19:00	Cuba	5–8	Japan		Tokyo Dome	3:25	32,717	Boxscore
Mar 15, 2017	12:00	Netherlands	14–1	Cuba	7	Tokyo Dome	2:19	40,680	Boxscore
Mar 15, 2017	19:00	Israel	3–8	Japan		Tokyo Dome	3:28	43,179	Boxscore

Undefeated Japan (3–0) and the Netherlands (2–1) advanced to the semi-final round, as Israel (1–2) came in third, and Cuba (0–3) fourth.

=== Pool F ===
Pos	Team	Pld	W	L	RF	RA	RD	PCT	GB	Qualification
1	Puerto Rico	3	3	0	22	8	+14	1.000	—	Advance to championship round
2	United States (H)	3	2	1	15	11	+4	.667	1	Advance to championship round
3	Dominican Republic	3	1	2	7	9	−2	.333	2	
4	Venezuela	3	0	3	4	20	−16	.000	3	

Rules for classification: Tiebreakers
(H) Hosts

Date	Local time	Road team	Score	Home team	Inn.	Venue	Game duration	Attendance	Boxscore
Mar 14, 2017	18:00	Dominican Republic	1−3	Puerto Rico		Petco Park	3:16	16,637	Boxscore
Mar 15, 2017	18:00	Venezuela	2−4	United States		Petco Park	3:13	16,635	Boxscore
Mar 16, 2017	19:00	Venezuela	0−3	Dominican Republic		Petco Park	4:05	16,390	Boxscore
Mar 17, 2017	19:00	United States	5−6	Puerto Rico		Petco Park	3:09	32,463	Boxscore
Mar 18, 2017	12:30	Puerto Rico	13−2	Venezuela		Petco Park	3:24	20,778	Boxscore
Mar 18, 2017	19:00	United States	6−3	Dominican Republic		Petco Park	3:40	43,002	Boxscore

Pool F started with Puerto Rico handing the Dominican Republic its first loss since the 2009 World Baseball Classic. Puerto Rico ended Pool F still undefeated and Venezuela was eliminated, going 0–3. The final game of the pool was a rematch between the United States and Dominican Republic to advance to the championship round. The DR took an early 2–0 lead in the first inning, but the United States came back to win 6–3 to eliminate the defending champions.

== Championship round ==
Semifinals
ER	Netherlands	3
FW	Puerto Rico	4
FR	United States	2
EW	Japan	1

Final
SF1W	Puerto Rico	0
SF2W	United States	8

=== Semifinals ===
Date	Local time	Road team	Score	Home team	Inn.	Venue	Game duration	Attendance	Boxscore
Mar 20, 2017	18:00	Netherlands	3–4	Puerto Rico	11	Dodger Stadium	4:19	24,865	Boxscore
Mar 21, 2017	18:00	United States	2–1	Japan		Dodger Stadium	3:12	33,462	Boxscore

=== Final ===
Date	Local time	Road team	Score	Home team	Inn.	Venue	Game duration	Attendance	Boxscore
Mar 22, 2017	18:00	United States	8–0	Puerto Rico		Dodger Stadium	3:30	51,565	Boxscore

== Final standings ==
The final standings were calculated by the WBSC for inclusion in the WBSC Men's Baseball World Rankings system.

In the final standings, ties were to be broken in the following order of priority:

1. The team with the highest Team's Quality Balance (TQB=(RS/IPO)–(RA/IPD)) in all games;
2. The team with the highest Earned Runs Team's Quality Balance (ER–TQB=(ERS/IPO)–(ERA/IPD)) in all games;
3. The team with the highest batting average (AVG) in all games;

Rk	Team	W	L	Tiebreaker
1st place, gold medalist(s)	United States	6	2	–
Lost in Final
2nd place, silver medalist(s)	Puerto Rico	7	1	–
Lost in Semifinals
3rd place, bronze medalist(s)	Japan	6	1	–
4	Netherlands	4	3	–
3rd place in Second Round pools
5	Dominican Republic	4	2	0.277 TQB
6	Israel	4	2	−0.008 TQB
4th place in Second Round pools
7	Cuba	2	4	–
8	Venezuela	2	5	–
3rd place in First Round pools
9	Australia	1	2	0.257 TQB
10	South Korea	1	2	−0.122 TQB
11	Colombia	1	2	−0.172 TQB
12	Italy	1	3	–
4th place in First Round pools
13	Mexico	1	2	–
14	Chinese Taipei	0	3	−0.471 TQB
15	Canada	0	3	−0.729 TQB
16	China	0	3	−0.962 TQB

2017 World Baseball Classic champions

United States
First title

When the 2017 WBC was played, it was assumed that the field for the following 2021 WBC would remain 16 teams. Under the qualification format in use at the time, the bottom four finishers from 2017 (Canada, China, Mexico, and Chinese Taipei) would've been forced to re-qualify for 2021. However, in January 2020, MLB announced it was expanding the field for the 2021 WBC from 16 teams to 20 and that all 16 participants from 2017 would receive automatic bids for 2021, thus sparing the bottom four nations from relegation to the qualifiers.

== Awards ==
=== Most Valuable Players ===
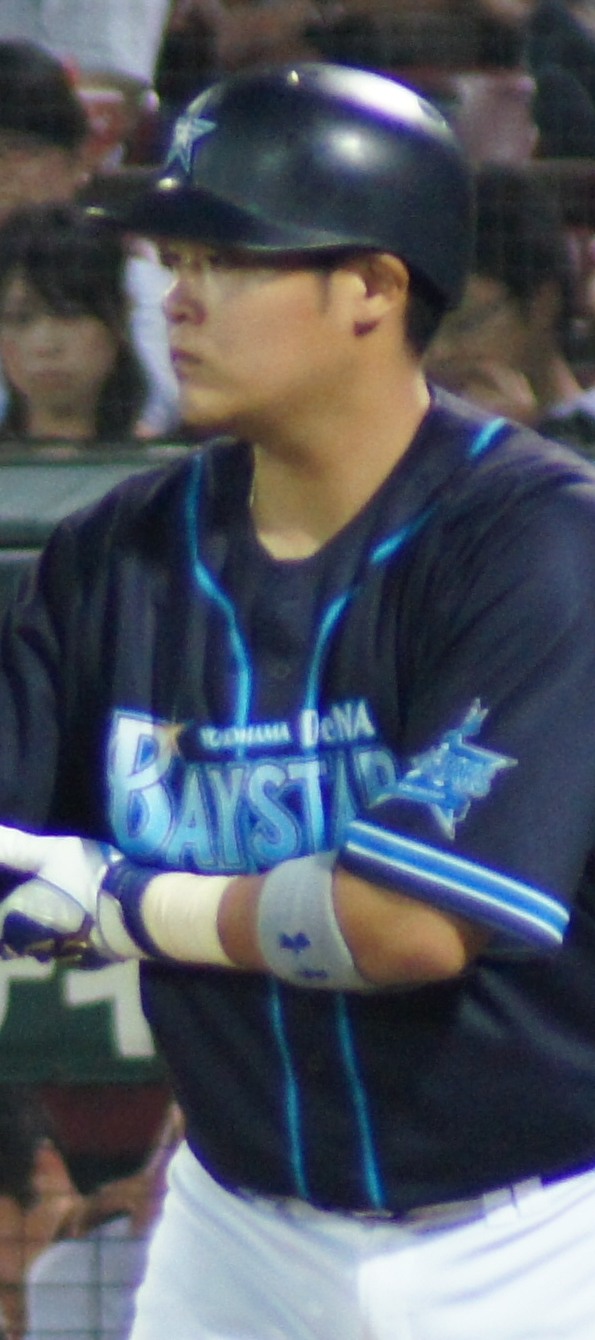
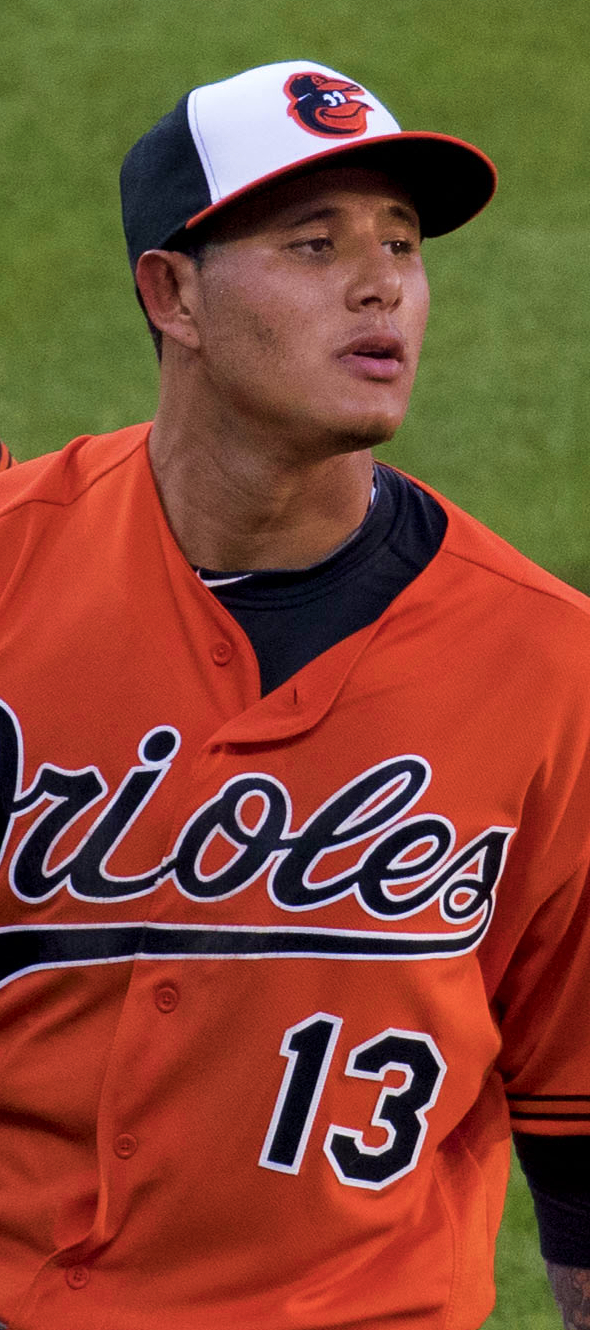
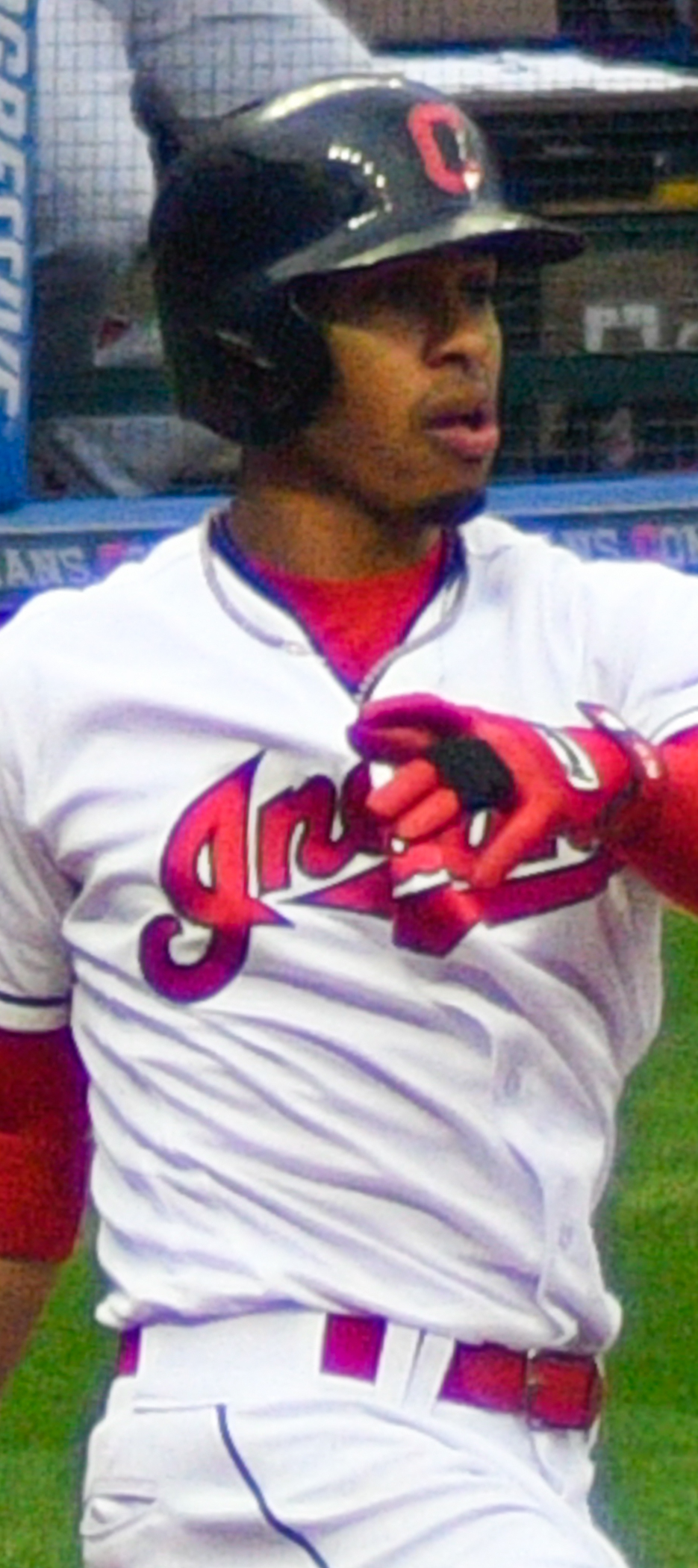
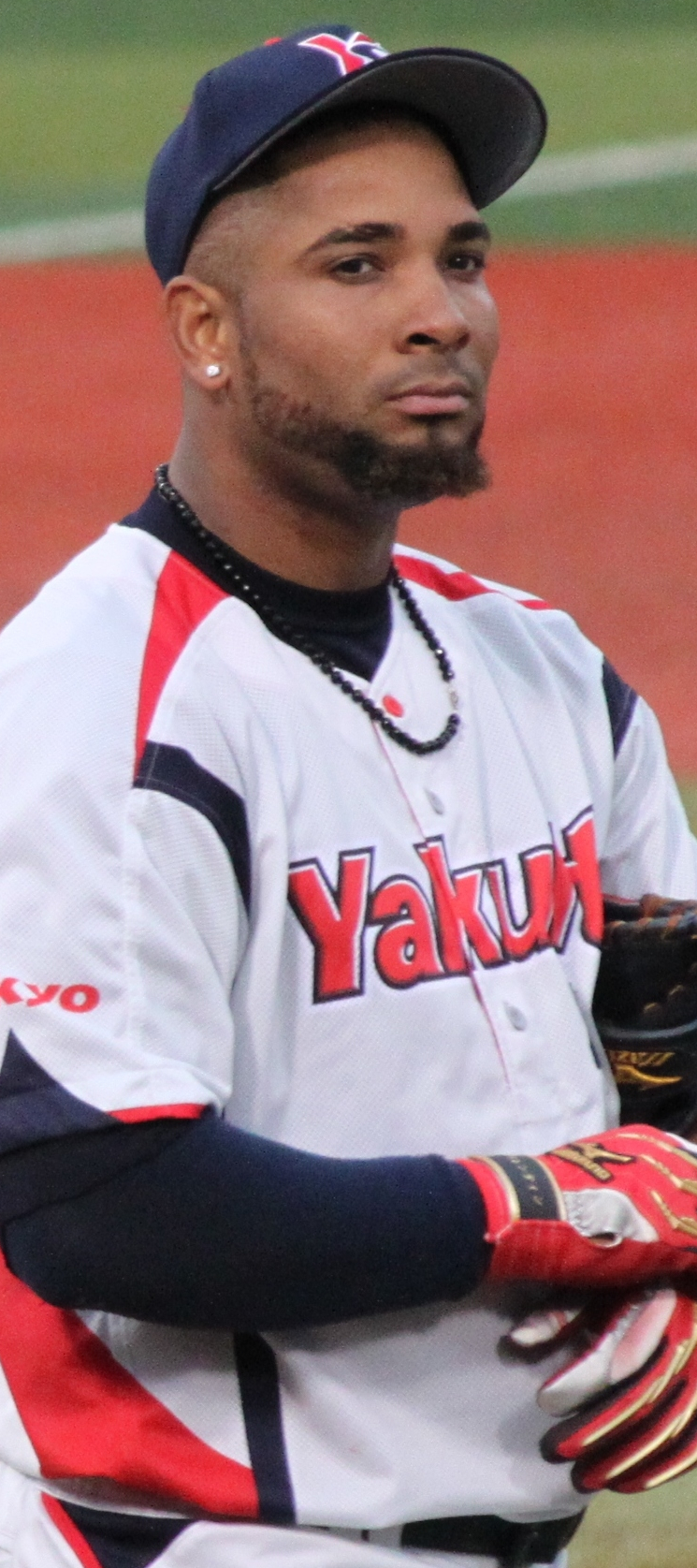
MVPs of each pools (from left to right);
Pool B – Yoshitomo Tsutsugo of Japan
Pool C – Manny Machado of the Dominican Republic
Pool D – Francisco Lindor of Puerto Rico
Pool E – Wladimir Balentien of the Netherlands

==== First round ====
- Pool A – (Israel) Ryan Lavarnway
- Pool B – (Japan) Yoshitomo Tsutsugo
- Pool C – (Dominican Republic) Manny Machado
- Pool D – (Puerto Rico) Francisco Lindor

==== Second round ====
- Pool E – (Netherlands) Wladimir Balentien
- Pool F – (Puerto Rico) Yadier Molina

==== Championship round ====
- Tournament – (United States) Marcus Stroman

=== 2017 All-World Baseball Classic team ===
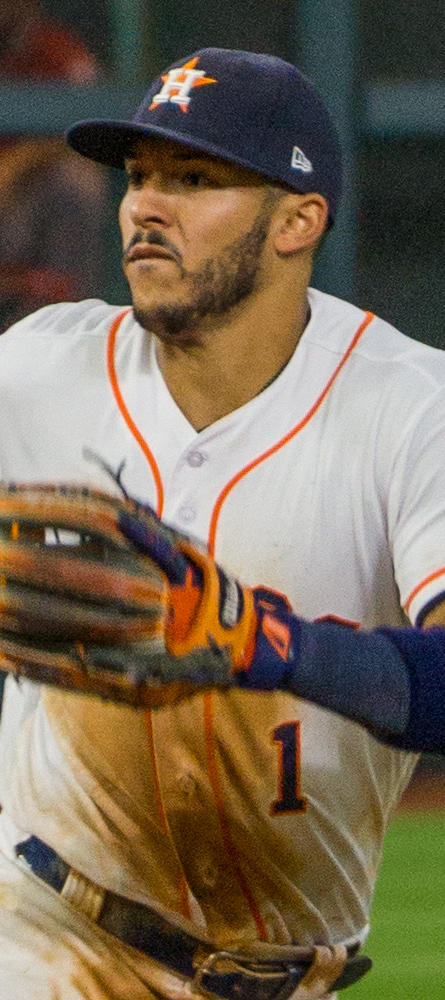
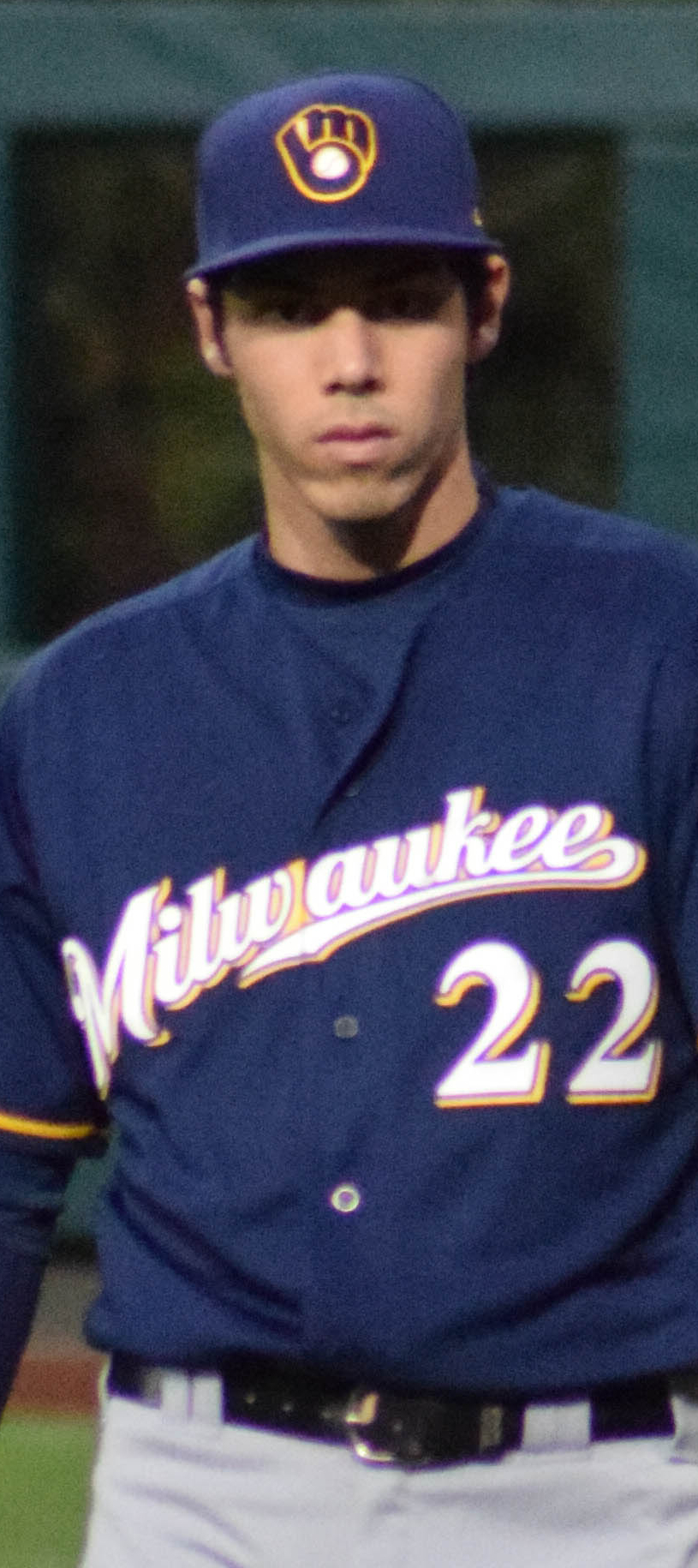
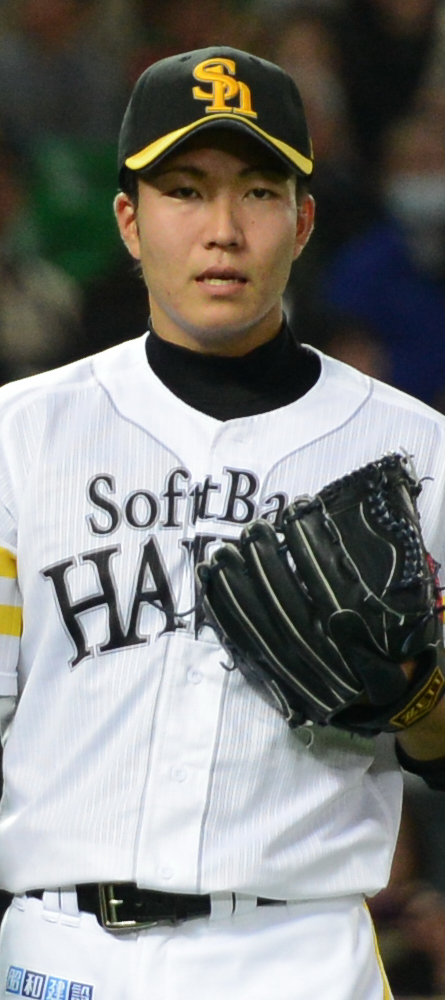
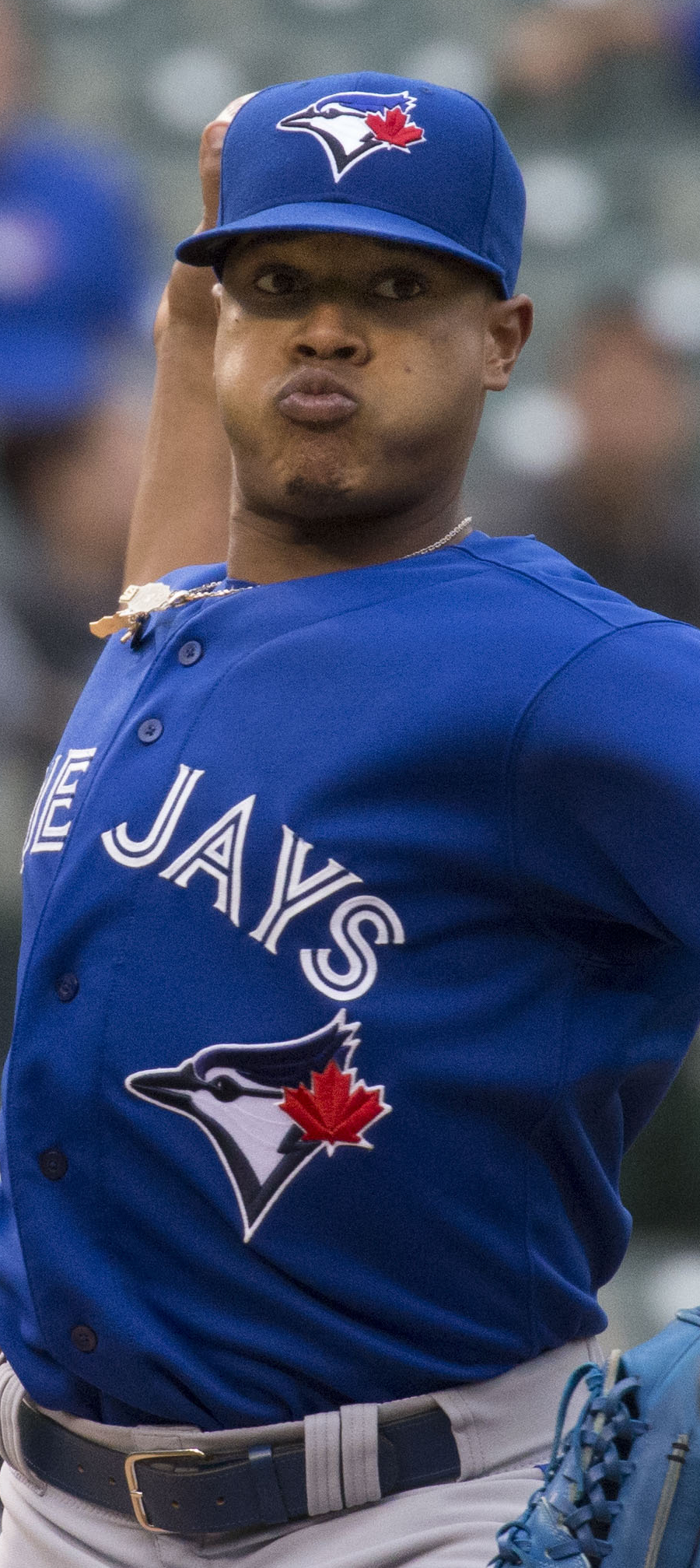
Players named to the All-WBC Team (from left to right);
Third baseman – Carlos Correa of Puerto Rico
Outfielder – Christian Yelich of the United States
Pitcher – Kodai Senga of Japan
Pitcher – Marcus Stroman of the United States

Position	Player
C	(Puerto Rico) Yadier Molina
1B	(United States) Eric Hosmer
2B	(Puerto Rico) Javier Báez
3B	(Puerto Rico) Carlos Correa
SS	(Puerto Rico) Francisco Lindor
OF	(Netherlands) Wladimir Balentien
OF	(Dominican Republic) Gregory Polanco
OF	(United States) Christian Yelich
DH	(Puerto Rico) Carlos Beltrán
P	(Japan) Kodai Senga
P	(United States) Marcus Stroman
P	(Israel) Josh Zeid

== Attendance ==
973,699 (avg. 24,342; pct. 72.3%)

=== First round ===
508,830 (avg. 20,353; pct. 74.3%)

- Pool A – 52,286 (avg. 8,714; pct. 51.9%)
- Pool B – 206,534 (avg. 34,422; pct. 82.0%)
- Pool C – 163,878 (avg. 27,313; pct. 74.3%)
- Pool D – 86,132 (avg. 12,305; pct. 76.9%)

=== Second round ===
354,977 (avg. 29,581; pct. 72.0%)

- Pool E – 209,072 (avg. 34,845; pct. 83.0%)
- Pool F – 145,905 (avg. 24,318; pct. 60.5%)

=== Championship round ===
109,892 (avg. 36,631; pct. 65.4%)

- Semifinals – 58,327 (avg. 29,164; pct. 52.1%)
- Final – 51,565 (avg. 51,565; pct. 92.1%)

== Statistics leaders ==
=== Batting ===
Statistic	Name	Total/Avg
Batting average*	(Mexico) Esteban Quiroz	.667
Hits	(Netherlands) Wladimir Balentien	16
Runs	(Netherlands) Wladimir Balentien (Puerto Rico) Carlos Correa	10
Home runs	(Netherlands) Wladimir Balentien	4
Runs batted in	(Netherlands) Wladimir Balentien	12
Strikeouts	(United States) Nolan Arenado	11
Stolen bases	(Puerto Rico) Javier Báez	4
On-base percentage*	(Mexico) Esteban Quiroz	.800
Slugging percentage*	(Mexico) Esteban Quiroz	1.833
OPS*	(Mexico) Esteban Quiroz	2.633

* Minimum 2.7 plate appearances per game

=== Pitching ===
Statistic	Name	Total/Avg
Wins	(United States) Danny Duffy (Puerto Rico) Seth Lugo	2
Losses	(Chinese Taipei) Hung-wen Chen (Canada) Ryan Dempster (Cuba) Yoanni Yera	2
Saves	(United States) Luke Gregerson	3
Innings pitched	(United States) Marcus Stroman	15.1
Hits allowed	(Netherlands) Rick van den Hurk	15
Runs allowed	(Netherlands) Rick van den Hurk	8
Earned runs allowed	(Netherlands) Rick van den Hurk	8
Earned run average*	(Israel) Josh Zeid	0.00**
Walks	(Cuba) Yoanni Yera	7
Strikeouts	(Japan) Kodai Senga (Japan) Tomoyuki Sugano	16
WHIP*	(Colombia) José Quintana	0.35

* Minimum 0.8 innings pitched per game
** Zeid is tied with 12 others with a 0.00 ERA but he has pitched the most innings (10.0)

== Broadcasting ==
=== Television ===
Territory	Rights holder
Australia	ESPN Australia
New Zealand	ESPN Australia
Brazil	ESPN Brazil
Canada	Sportsnet/RDS
Colombia	Telecaribe/Win Sports
Cuba	Tele Rebelde, Digital Channels: HD 1 y HD 2.
Dominican Republic	CDN Sports-Max
Cyprus	Fox Sports Greece
Greece	Fox Sports Greece
Turkey	Fox Sports Turkey
Italy	Fox Sports Italy
Malta	Fox Sports Italy
San Marino	Fox Sports Italy
Israel	Fox Sports Israel
Japan	J Sports, TBS, TV Asahi
Latin America	DirecTV Sports (es)
Southeast Asia	Fox Sports Asia
Hong Kong	Fox Sports Asia
Macau	Fox Sports Asia
Taiwan	Fox Sports Asia
Mexico	Televisa Deportes
Netherlands	Fox Sports Netherlands
Philippines	Sports5
Puerto Rico	Wapa 2 Deportes
Russia	Viasat Sport (semifinals and final)
South Korea	JTBC, JTBC3 Fox Sports
Taiwan	Eleven Sports/PTS
United States	MLB Network/ESPN Deportes
Venezuela	Direct TV/IVC/TLT/TVes

=== Radio ===
Territory	Rights holder
United States	ESPN Radio (semifinals and finals)/ESPN Deportes Radio
United States	SiriusXM
