= 2018 Washington Nationals season =

2018 Washington Nationals
- League: National League
- Division: East
- Ballpark: Nationals Park
- City: Washington, D.C.
- Record: 82–80 (.506)
- Divisional place: 2nd
- Owners: Lerner Enterprises
- General managers: Mike Rizzo
- Managers: Dave Martinez
- Television: MASN (Bob Carpenter, FP Santangelo, Johnny Holliday, Ray Knight)
- Radio: 106.7 The Fan; Washington Nationals Radio Network (Charlie Slowes, Dave Jageler)

The 2018 Washington Nationals season was the Nationals' 14th season as the baseball franchise of Major League Baseball in the District of Columbia, the 11th season at Nationals Park, and the 50th since the original team was started in Montreal, Quebec, Canada. The regular season began on March 29, 2018, and ended on September 30, 2018.

Nationals Park hosted the 2018 Major League Baseball All-Star Game on July 17, 2018, the first time it hosted a Major League Baseball All-Star Game. It was the fifth MLB All-Star Game held in Washington, D.C., and the first since 1969.

== Offseason ==
=== Team news ===
The Washington Nationals announced on October 20, 2017, that manager Dusty Baker and his coaching staff would not return for the 2018 season. Baker had originally been hired after the 2015 season to a two-year deal as manager, which the Nationals opted not to extend.

Among the candidates interviewed for the managerial opening were Chicago Cubs bench coach Dave Martinez, former Boston Red Sox manager John Farrell, and New York Mets hitting coach Kevin Long. The Washington Post reported October 29 that Martinez and the Nationals had agreed on a three-year contract with an option for the 2021 season. The hiring was officially announced October 30. General manager Mike Rizzo said the Nationals chose to zero in on "someone who is progressive, someone who can connect with and communicate well with our players, and someone who embraces the analytical side of the game" and concluded Martinez — who had played for the Montreal Expos years before the team moved to Washington, D.C., and had won the 2016 World Series with the Cubs as manager Joe Maddon's longtime bench coach (Note: Martinez was hired as bench coach under Maddon for the Tampa Bay Rays' 2008 season, served in that role through the 2014 season, and followed Maddon to the Chicago Cubs starting in the 2015 season. He spent a total of 10 seasons as Maddon's bench coach between the Rays and the Cubs. (See Skrbina, Paul, "Cubs bench coach Dave Martinez to interview for Nationals job," Chicago Tribune, October 23, 2017.)) — was best suited for the job. Long was announced as the Nationals' hitting coach on November 2. The Nationals rehired Bob Henley as third base coach, also announcing November 9 that former Arizona Diamondbacks manager Chip Hale had been hired as bench coach, former St. Louis Cardinals pitching coach Derek Lilliquist had been hired as pitching coach, (Note: Lilliquist effectively swapped jobs with Mike Maddux, the Nationals' pitching coach in the 2016 and 2017 seasons. The Cardinals dismissed Lilliquist, their pitching coach for six seasons, after the 2017 season and hired Maddux to replace him for the 2018 season. (See "Lilliquist takes Maddux's place as Nationals pitching coach," St. Louis Post-Dispatch, November 9, 2017.)) and former Seattle Mariners bench coach Tim Bogar had been hired as first base coach. Former major league utilityman Joe Dillon was also hired to support Long as assistant hitting coach. The Nationals rounded out Martinez's staff on November 15, announcing that Cubs quality assurance coach Henry Blanco had been hired as bullpen coach.

The Nationals had the largest free agent class in Major League Baseball, losing right-handed relievers Matt Albers, Joe Blanton, and Brandon Kintzler; left-handed reliever Óliver Pérez; starting pitcher Edwin Jackson; backup catcher José Lobatón; utility players Stephen Drew and Howie Kendrick; and outfielders Alejandro De Aza, Ryan Raburn, and Jayson Werth to free agency as their contracts expired. First baseman and left fielder Adam Lind also became a free agent as the Nationals declined his option. Catcher Matt Wieters decided to exercise his $10.5 million player option, remaining a National for another season. The Nationals signed nearly half of their departing free agents to new contracts: Kintzler agreed to a new deal including club and player options for the 2019 season to stay in Washington, and Kendrick agreed to a two-year deal to return, while Jackson, Raburn, and De Aza re-signed with the Nationals on minor league deals. The team elected to tender one-year contracts to all three of its arbitration-eligible players — third baseman Anthony Rendon, right-handed pitcher Tanner Roark, and outfielder Michael A. Taylor — after having previously reached a one-year extension agreement for right fielder Bryce Harper, who had also been eligible for arbitration in his final year before free agency, for the 2018 season back in May. The team avoided arbitration with all three players, with salary agreements for each being announced January 12, 2018.

Rizzo stated the Nationals were primarily interested in adding right-handed relief pitching, along with "depth" for their starting rotation and bench, during the off-season. Among the free agents Washington was linked to, with varying reports on their level of interest: catchers Alex Avila (ultimately signed by the Arizona Diamondbacks) and Jonathan Lucroy (ultimately signed by the Oakland Athletics); right-handed relievers Wade Davis (ultimately signed by the Colorado Rockies), Greg Holland, Addison Reed (ultimately signed by the Minnesota Twins), and Hector Rondon (ultimately signed by the Houston Astros); right-handed starting pitchers Jake Arrieta (ultimately signed by the Philadelphia Phillies); Alex Cobb (ultimately signed by the Baltimore Orioles), and Lance Lynn (ultimately signed by the Minnesota Twins); and Nippon Professional Baseball pitcher and outfielder Shohei Ohtani (ultimately signed by the Los Angeles Angels). They were also connected to Lind, who had contributed to the team's 2017 season, prior to signing free agent Matt Adams to serve as a backup first baseman and outfielder, as well as to Albers, another 2017 National, before re-signing Kintzler. Media reports also connected the Nationals to potential trade candidates like catcher J. T. Realmuto and outfielders Marcell Ozuna (ultimately traded to the St. Louis Cardinals) and Christian Yelich (ultimately traded to the Milwaukee Brewers), all of the Miami Marlins; right-handed starting pitcher Gerrit Cole of the Pittsburgh Pirates (ultimately traded to the Houston Astros); and right-handed starting pitchers Chris Archer and Jake Odorizzi (ultimately traded to the Minnesota Twins), both of the Tampa Bay Rays.

Amid a fairly quiet off-season on the trade front, the Nationals made a deal with the division-rival New York Mets shortly before opening their spring training camp to acquire utility infielder Matt Reynolds for cash considerations. A rumored trade of Wieters to the Athletics during spring training did not materialize, with Oakland instead signing the free agent Lucroy to a major league contract.

The Nationals' streak of seasons, dating back to their inaugural 2005 season, of not having a player on their active roster test positive for performance-enhancing drugs came to an end February 7, 2018, when Major League Baseball handed catcher Raudy Read an 80-game suspension over a positive test for the banned steroid Boldenone. Read was placed on the restricted list.

=== Transactions ===
- November 14, 2017: The Nationals signed right-handed pitcher Jaron Long to a minor league contract with an invitation to spring training.
- November 19, 2017: The Nationals signed outfielder Ryan Raburn to a minor league contract with an invitation to spring training.
- December 9, 2017: The Nationals signed right-handed pitcher David Goforth to a minor league contract with an invitation to spring training.
- December 16, 2017: The Nationals signed left-handed pitcher Ismael Guillón to a minor league contract with an invitation to spring training.
- December 18, 2017: The Nationals signed right-handed pitcher César Vargas to a minor league contract with an invitation to spring training.
- December 21, 2017: The Nationals signed right-handed relief pitcher Brandon Kintzler to a two-year major league contract and signed left-handed pitcher Tommy Milone and right-handed pitcher Chris Smith to minor league contracts with invitations to spring training.
- December 22, 2017: The Nationals signed first baseman and outfielder Matt Adams to a one-year major league contract and signed infielder and outfielder Chris Dominguez to a minor league contract with an invitation to spring training.
- December 29, 2017: The Nationals signed left-handed pitcher Tim Collins to a minor league contract with an invitation to spring training.
- January 3, 2018: The Nationals signed right-handed pitcher Román Méndez to a minor league contract with an invitation to spring training.
- January 10, 2018: The Nationals signed outfielder Moises Sierra to a minor league contract with an invitation to spring training.
- January 11, 2018: The Nationals signed right-handed pitcher Edwin Jackson to a minor league contract with an invitation to spring training.
- January 18, 2018: The Nationals signed second baseman and outfielder Howie Kendrick to a two-year major league contract.
- January 31, 2018: The Nationals signed infielder Reid Brignac to a minor league contract with an invitation to spring training.
- February 1, 2018: The Nationals signed catcher Miguel Montero to a minor league contract with an invitation to spring training.
- February 12, 2018: The Nationals acquired infielder and outfielder Matt Reynolds from the New York Mets for cash considerations.
- February 21, 2018: The Nationals signed right-handed relief pitcher Joaquin Benoit to a one-year major league contract.
- March 17, 2018: The Nationals signed right-handed pitcher Jeremy Hellickson to a minor league contract with an invitation to spring training.
- March 24, 2018: The Nationals released infielder Reid Brignac, right-handed pitcher Jeremy Hellickson, and outfielder Ryan Raburn from minor league contracts and re-signed Hellickson to a minor league contract.
- March 27, 2018: The Nationals selected the contract of minor league catcher Miguel Montero.

=== Spring training ===
The Nationals held spring training at their facility at The Ballpark of The Palm Beaches in West Palm Beach, Florida, which they shared with the 2017 World Series champion Houston Astros. It was their second year at the facility. On February 16, the Nationals and Astros signed a 12-year deal for the naming rights to the stadium with FITTEAM, an event brand partnership and organic products firm in Palm Beach Gardens, Florida, resulting in the facility being renamed FITTEAM Ballpark of the Palm Beaches effective that day. Astros, Nationals, and FITTEAM executives held a ceremony behind home plate on February 21, 2018, to officially unveil the new name and a new logo for the facility reflecting the name change.

The Nationals announced 21 non-roster invitees to major league spring training on February 13, 2018: pitchers Tim Collins, Jimmy Cordero, Brady Dragmire, David Goforth, Ismael Guillón, Bryan Harper, Edwin Jackson, Jaron Long, Román Méndez, Tommy Milone, Chris Smith, and César Vargas; catchers Taylor Gushue, Spencer Kieboom, Miguel Montero, and Jhonatan Solano; infielders Osvaldo Abreu, Reid Brignac, and Chris Dominguez; and outfielders Ryan Raburn and Moises Sierra. Pitchers and catchers reported to camp the following day, and position players followed on February 19.

The Nationals announced reliever Koda Glover was dealing with a recurrence of the right shoulder inflammation that had prematurely ended his season in 2017, leading the team to shut him down by February 18. Following the Nationals' signing of Joaquin Benoit to contend for a spot in the major league bullpen, starting pitcher Joe Ross, still rehabbing from Tommy John surgery in July 2017, was placed on the 60-day disabled list effective February 21.

Washington sent Milone to the mound to start the opener of Grapefruit League action on February 23, an "away" game for the Nationals at FITTEAM Ballpark of the Palm Beaches against the Astros. Both teams elected to wear the caps of the Marjory Stoneman Douglas High School baseball team to honor students and staff slain on February 14 in the Stoneman Douglas High School shooting in nearby Parkland, Florida. Houston took the lead in the third inning with a two-run home run by catcher Max Stassi off Long, who came on in relief of Milone after two scoreless innings. The Nationals struck back in the fifth inning, with the third baseman Dominguez driving home left fielder Andrew Stevenson after he doubled and then being brought home on an RBI single by first baseman Jose Marmolejos. But the tie game was short-lived, as Dragmire took the mound in the bottom of the fifth and immediately surrendered a solo home run to Astros third baseman J. D. Davis. Both teams were effectively kept off the board for the rest of the game, and the Astros won 3–2.

Nationals outfielder Bryce Harper, entering his final season before expected free agency in the winter, had an ingrown toenail that required minor surgery on February 28. He was one of several Nationals reported to be dealing with minor injuries, with outfielders Raburn and Michael A. Taylor both scratched from early spring contests with side tightness and first basemen Ryan Zimmerman and Matt Adams also missing several games early in the spring with fleeting health concerns: "stiffness" for Zimmerman and a foot blister for Adams. Additionally, the Nationals were cautious in their handling of second baseman Daniel Murphy and outfielder Adam Eaton, both recovering from knee surgeries in 2017. Reliever Wander Suero injured his side during an appearance out of the bullpen on March 8, prompting the Nationals to shut him down and option him to minor league camp; fellow right-hander Benoit was shut down in mid-March with a forearm strain. A. J. Cole, attempting to win a spot in the starting rotation, missed a mid-March start due to illness. Shortstop Trea Turner also underwent a procedure on March 19 to remove an ingrown toenail, prompting manager Dave Martinez to quip, "That's been the trend of spring."

Minor-league spring training began in the first week of March, and on March 5, the Nationals sent left-handed pitcher Seth Romero home to Houston indefinitely from minor-league camp for repeated curfew violations. Romero – the Nationals' first-round pick in the 2017 Major League Baseball draft and ranked by MLB Pipeline as the No. 5 prospect in the Nationals organization – had been suspended twice and finally dismissed permanently for rules violations during his college career with the University of Houston Cougars baseball team, raising concerns about his character, but the Nationals did not cut ties with him. Instead, they gave him a list of things he had to do to earn his way back into the organization, with the expectation that he would meet those requirements and play in the Nationals' farm system again sometime during the 2018 season.

The Nationals made a late addition to their slate of non-roster invitees on March 17, 2018, signing starting pitcher Jeremy Hellickson to a minor league contract with an invitation to major league camp. Hellickson was reportedly brought into the organization to compete for the last spot in the major league rotation, along with Erick Fedde, Cole, Jackson, and Milone. The team announced March 23 that Cole would start the season in the major league rotation, with Hellickson working to build up his stamina as a starter. The Nationals informed Montero the following day that he would open the year as the major league backup catcher behind Matt Wieters. The day after that, the Nationals optioned utilitymen Matt Reynolds and Adrián Sánchez to the minor leagues, leaving the team with an extra reliever in the bullpen and a four-man bench at the end of the preseason.

Veteran first baseman Ryan Zimmerman's 2018 spring training regimen was extremely unusual and perhaps unprecedented, sparking much discussion and debate among fans and the press. During the spring he appeared in only one major-league game, against the New York Mets at First Data Field at Port St. Lucie, Florida, on March 2, going 1-for-2 with a line out to right fielder Jay Bruce in the first inning and a soft liner into center field for a double off pitcher Hansel Robles in the fourth inning. Otherwise, he stayed out of the public eye, playing strictly in simulated and minor-league games on the back fields of the FITTEAM Ballpark of the Palm Beaches complex, virtually unobserved by fans and the press. A reported bout Zimmerman had with back stiffness early in spring training led to speculation among fans and the press that Zimmerman and the Nationals were trying to hide an injury from public scrutiny, but the Nationals' staff denied it. They explained that Zimmerman disliked the conventional spring training regimen, seeing himself a needing only 50 at-bats to prepare himself for the regular season, and that he had proposed to manager Dave Martinez early in the 2018 edition of spring training that he restrict himself to the back fields and prepare for the regular season at his own pace to ensure that he would be in the best possible health when the season began, and Martinez had approved of the plan under the assumption that, as a veteran, Zimmerman could be trusted to prepare in a way that was best for him. By playing in the more controlled environment of simulated and minor league games, he enjoyed far more flexibility than in Grapefruit League games; he could prepare at his own pace, batting – even leading off – in every inning or skipping at-bats, all while having a choice as to whether to play in the field or not from inning to inning. The Nationals' staff assured reporters that Zimmerman was getting plenty of at-bats, looked good on the back fields, and would be fully ready for Opening Day. In discussions with the press about his unusual spring training plan, Zimmerman dismissed concerns about his health and preparedness for the regular season, good-naturedly arguing that his success or failure during the regular season would be the best way to judge his spring regimen, and that by early in the regular season fans and reporters would forget all about spring training. By Opening Day, Zimmerman revealed that he had avoided baserunning and fielding entirely so as to better manage his chronic problems with an arthritic shoulder and plantar fasciitis, and that in simulated and minor-league games he had often had eight at-bats a day rather than the two or three he would have had in Grapefruit League games, and he entered the regular season fully healthy.

The Nationals won their penultimate spring training game, defeating the St. Louis Cardinals 4–2 on March 25 at FITTEAM Ballpark of the Palm Beaches with starting pitcher Stephen Strasburg striking out 10 Cardinals, most of them regulars, in 5 2/3 innings. They broke camp that day and headed north to Washington, where they completed spring training with an exhibition game at Nationals Park against the Minnesota Twins on March 27. With 23,877 fans looking on – and Zimmerman choosing not to play – the Twins beat the Nationals 3–1, and Washington finished spring training with a Grapefruit League record of 13–17–2.

== Regular season ==
=== Opening Day ===
==== Opening Day lineup ====
Opening Day Starters
Name	Position
Adam Eaton	Left field
Anthony Rendon	Third base
Bryce Harper	Right field
Ryan Zimmerman	First base
Howie Kendrick	Second base
Trea Turner	Shortstop
Michael A. Taylor	Center field
Matt Wieters	Catcher
Max Scherzer	Pitcher

==== Game recap ====
The Nationals' 2018 regular season began a day later than planned when the Cincinnati Reds made the unusual decision to postpone a game more than 24 hours before the scheduled first pitch, announcing on March 28 that because of a rainy forecast the March 29 Opening Day game at Great American Ballpark in Cincinnati – the earliest opening day in MLB history excluding international openers – would be postponed until March 30, a date previously scheduled as an off day specifically for the purpose of rescheduling the opener in the event it was postponed. The decision came too late for the Nationals to delay their departure from Washington, and they arrived in Cincinnati on the afternoon of March 28.

Max Scherzer got the Opening Day start for Washington, striking out eight of the first 11 Reds he faced, including seven in a row. He pitched six shutout innings in which he threw 100 pitches and struck out ten Reds, the 65th 10-strikeout game of his career. The trio of Brandon Kintzler, Ryan Madson, and closer Sean Doolittle pitched the seventh, eighth, and ninth innings and preserved the shutout.

On offense, the Nationals got on the board early. In the top of the first inning left fielder Adam Eaton led off with a single and right fielder Bryce Harper singled with one out, advancing Eaton to third. First baseman Ryan Zimmerman, making his first appearance against major-league pitching since an early Grapefruit League game on March 2, then hit a ground ball to Cincinnati third baseman Eugenio Suárez that looked like it would result in an inning-ending double-play, but after Suárez threw to second baseman Scooter Gennett to force out Harper, Harper's slide into the base prompted Gennett to bounce his throw to first baseman Joey Votto; Votto could not handle the bounce, and Zimmerman was safe at first on a fielder's choice, allowing Eaton to score what proved to be the decisive run. It was the only run Reds starting pitcher Homer Bailey gave up in his own six innings of work, but Bailey took the loss. The Nationals tacked on one more run in the top of the ninth when center fielder Michael A. Taylor "manufactured" a run by leading off with a single, stealing second base, advancing to third on a groundout by catcher Matt Wieters, and scoring on a sacrifice fly by pinch-hitter Brian Goodwin. Doolittle then hammered down the save in the bottom of the ninth, striking out two of the four batters he faced in the inning, and the Nationals won 2–0.

The game took place before 43,878 fans, the largest regular-season crowd in the history of Great American Ball Park. It was Nationals manager Dave Martinez's first career win as a manager.

=== Season standings ===
==== National League East ====
NL East
Team	W	L	Pct.	GB	Home	Road
Atlanta Braves	90	72	.556	—	43‍–‍38	47‍–‍34
Washington Nationals	82	80	.506	8	41‍–‍40	41‍–‍40
Philadelphia Phillies	80	82	.494	10	49‍–‍32	31‍–‍50
New York Mets	77	85	.475	13	37‍–‍44	40‍–‍41
Miami Marlins	63	98	.391	26½	38‍–‍43	25‍–‍55

==== National League Wild Card ====
Division leaders
Team	W	L	Pct.
Milwaukee Brewers	96	67	.589
Los Angeles Dodgers	92	71	.564
Atlanta Braves	90	72	.556

Wild Card teams (Top 2 teams qualify for postseason)
Team	W	L	Pct.	GB
Chicago Cubs	95	68	.583	+4
Colorado Rockies	91	72	.558	—
St. Louis Cardinals	88	74	.543	2½
Pittsburgh Pirates	82	79	.509	8
Arizona Diamondbacks	82	80	.506	8½
Washington Nationals	82	80	.506	8½
Philadelphia Phillies	80	82	.494	10½
New York Mets	77	85	.475	13½
San Francisco Giants	73	89	.451	17½
Cincinnati Reds	67	95	.414	23½
San Diego Padres	66	96	.407	24½
Miami Marlins	63	98	.391	27

=== Record vs. opponents ===
2018 National League record Source: MLB Standings Grid – 2018
Team	AZ	ATL	CHC	CIN	COL	LAD	MIA	MIL	NYM	PHI	PIT	SD	SF	STL	WSH	AL
Arizona	—	3–4	3–4	3–3	8–11	11–8	6–1	1–5	2–5	4–2	6–1	12–7	8–11	3–3	2–5	10–10
Atlanta	4–3	—	3–3	3–4	2–5	2–5	14–5	3–4	13–6	12–7	5–1	4–3	3–3	4–2	10–9	8–12
Chicago	4–3	3–3	—	11–8	3–3	4–3	5–2	11–9	6–1	4–2	10–9	5–2	3–3	9–10	4–3	13–7
Cincinnati	3–3	4–3	8–11	—	2–4	6–1	2–5	6–13	3–3	3–4	5–14	3–4	4–2	7–12	1–6	10–10
Colorado	11–8	5–2	3–3	4–2	—	7–13	2–4	2–5	6–1	5–2	3–3	11–8	12–7	2–5	5–2	13–7
Los Angeles	8–11	5–2	3–4	1–6	13–7	—	2–4	4–3	4–2	3–4	5–1	14–5	10–9	3–4	5–1	12–8
Miami	1–6	5–14	2–5	5–2	4–2	4–2	—	2–5	7–12	8–11	1–4	2–5	4–3	3–3	6–13	9–11
Milwaukee	5–1	4–3	9–11	13–6	5–2	3–4	5–2	—	4–3	3–3	7–12	4–2	6–1	11–8	4–2	13–7
New York	5–2	6–13	1–6	3–3	1–6	2–4	12–7	3–4	—	11–8	3–4	4–2	4–3	3–3	11–8	8–12
Philadelphia	2–4	7–12	2–4	4–3	2–5	4–3	11–8	3–3	8–11	—	6–1	3–3	4–3	4–3	8–11	12–8
Pittsburgh	1–6	1–5	9–10	14–5	3–3	1–5	4–1	12–7	4–3	1–6	—	3–4	4–3	8–11	2–5	15–5
San Diego	7–12	3–4	2–5	4–3	8–11	5–14	5–2	2–4	2–4	3–3	4–3	—	8–11	4–3	2–4	7–13
San Francisco	11–8	3–3	3–3	2–4	7–12	9–10	3–4	1–6	3–4	3–4	3–4	11–8	—	2–5	4–2	8–12
St. Louis	3–3	2–4	10–9	12–7	5–2	4–3	3–3	8–11	3–3	3–4	11–8	3–4	5–2	—	5–2	11–9
Washington	5–2	9–10	3–4	6–1	2–5	1–5	13–6	2–4	8–11	11–8	5–2	4–2	2–4	2–5	—	9–11

The October 1 tiebreaker games were regular-season games that are included here.

=== March–April ===
The Washington Nationals opened their season with a three-game sweep of the Cincinnati Reds at Great American Ball Park, led by left fielder Adam Eaton, who returned from missing eleven months due to a knee injury in April 2017 to go 8-for-13 (.615), including two doubles, two home runs, and a game-opening hit in all three contests, with seven runs scored, five RBIs, and only one strikeout. He went 5-for-5 in the second game of the series on March 31. Eaton and his teammates combined for eight home runs in the series, eclipsing the team record of six over the first three games of a season. (Note: The previous Nationals record for home runs across the opening series of a season was set in the previous season. (See Collier, Jamal, "Eaton stays hot as Nats finish sweep of Reds," MLB.com, April 1, 2017)) On April 2, Eaton was named National League Player of the Week.

The Nationals began their next series on April 2 by beating the Atlanta Braves 8–1, winning the first four games of the regular season for the first time since arriving in Washington, It was the first 4–0 start for the franchise since the Montreal Expos won their first four games in 1983. They dropped their first game of the year to the Braves on April 3, as starting pitcher A. J. Cole hit his first major league home run in the second inning but surrendered 10 earned runs, (Note: It was the first time a pitcher had allowed at least 10 earned runs while homering in a game since Zack Greinke for the Kansas City Royals in a loss to the Arizona Diamondbacks on June 10, 2005. (See @StatsBySTATS, "The @Nationals A.J. Cole hit a home run but allowed 10 earned runs on the mound," Twitter.com, April 3, 2018)) tying a franchise record for earned runs allowed in a start (Note: In his only regular-season appearance for the Nationals, starting pitcher Jeremy Guthrie gave up 10 earned runs while recording just two outs in a loss to the Philadelphia Phillies on April 8, 2017, the most recent time a Nationals pitcher had allowed double-digit earned runs in a game. (See Grathoff, Pete, "Nine tweets show how historically awful Jeremy Guthrie's start was Saturday," The Kansas City Star, April 9, 2017)) and taking the loss. Right fielder Bryce Harper homered in his third consecutive game in the 13–6 loss.

The Nationals returned to Washington with a record of 4–2. Immediately upon their return, general manager Mike Rizzo signed a two-year contract extension with the Nationals reportedly worth $4 million a year that would keep him in Washington through the end of the 2020 season, and the Nationals announced the deal on the morning of their home opener on April 7. Facing the New York Mets in the Nationals' season opener on April 5, Stephen Strasburg struggled after a strong first inning, ultimately surrendering four earned runs over six innings and being saddled with the loss; the Mets hit three home runs in the contest, including a Jay Bruce grand slam off reliever Brandon Kintzler in the seventh inning that iced the game. Eaton left the game in the top of the sixth inning with a minor ankle injury, a worrying development for the Nationals after his season-ending injury in April 2017. The Nationals challenged Mets starter Jacob deGrom in the sixth, loading the bases with no outs, but failed to score, and Washington shortstop Trea Turner argued with umpire Doug Eddings over an inning-ending called strike and was ejected from the game for the first time in his career. The loss dropped the Nationals' record in home openers to 5–9 overall and 4–7 at Nationals Park, with first baseman Ryan Zimmerman's limited spring training regimen coming under renewed scrutiny as he struggled at the plate.

With Eaton day-to-day following his removal from the home opener, the Nationals opted to expand their bench by adding utilityman Matt Reynolds, recalling him from the Class-AAA Syracuse Chiefs on April 7. Catcher Miguel Montero was placed on the paternity list and the Nationals purchased the contract of veteran catcher Jhonatan Solano, who had last appeared in the major leagues in the 2015 season, from Syracuse to replace him. Left-handed reliever Enny Romero, who had struggled in spring training and over the first seven games of the season, was designated for assignment to clear space on the 40-man roster for Solano. Manager Dave Martinez also confirmed that Cole would remain in the rotation following his 10-run outing against the Braves, but that his next start would be skipped. Despite the changes, the Mets followed up their victory in the Nationals' home opener by completing a three-game sweep of the Nationals even though the Nationals had scored first in each game and despite a stand-out offensive performance by Harper, who, playing in only the ninth game of the season on April 8, had already become the first player in MLB history with at least six home runs (leading the National League) and 13 walks in his team's first 10 or fewer games. Kintzler took both losses in relief, following up his disastrous relief appearance in the home opener. Martinez was ejected from the latter game on April 8 after protesting home plate umpire Marty Foster's decision to eject third baseman Anthony Rendon for tossing his bat after a called third strike; it was the first ejection of Martinez's managerial career, and he got his money's worth, throwing his ballcap down and kicking at the dirt around home plate before leaving the field of play. The Nationals completed the Mets series with a record of 4–5, their first sub-.500 regular-season record since August 2015, ending an MLB-best 961 straight days at .500 or better. The Nationals' losing streak stretched to five games with the sweep at the hands of the division-rival Mets, their longest since a stretch of seven straight losses in June 2016.

The Nationals snapped their losing streak behind a 102-pitch, complete-game shutout from Scherzer against the Braves at Nationals Park on April 9, his ninth complete game and fifth shutout in his career, in which he allowed two hits and struck out 10 Braves, issuing no walks and not allowing any Brave to reach second base. Second baseman Howie Kendrick provided all the offense the Nationals needed or would receive in the 2–0 contest with a two-run double in the bottom of the first inning. Scherzer also notched his first career stolen base on his first career stolen base attempt, singling and then swiping second in the seventh inning off the battery of Atlanta reliever Peter Moylan and catcher Kurt Suzuki; it was the first time in history a Nationals pitcher stole a base. (Note: The only MLB pitcher previously to have stolen a base while pitching a complete-game shutout with double-digit strikeouts was Nolan Ryan, who accomplished the feat for the Houston Astros on May 16, 1984, against the Pittsburgh Pirates. (See Collier, Jamal, "Scherzer joins Nolan Ryan in exclusive club," MLB.com, April 9, 2018)) Scherzer's start was nearly matched the following day by Strasburg, who pitched eight shutout innings en route to a 4–1 win over Atlanta. The Nationals activated Montero before the game, although he did not play in it, and placed Solano on the 10-day disabled list with bone chips in his elbow. Eaton was assigned to the 10-day disabled list as well on April 11 with a bone bruise in his ankle. To fill his spot on the roster, the Nationals selected the contract of outfielder Moisés Sierra from Class-AAA Syracuse. Montero was designated for assignment to clear a roster spot for Sierra. The Nationals also activated Wieters from the disabled list after he had played in one rehab game at Class-A Advanced Potomac. Washington was unable to complete a three-game sweep of the Braves later that day, as while Cole was much more effective in his second start of the year, giving up two runs and pitching one out into the sixth inning, and the Nationals were able to force extra innings, veteran setup man Ryan Madson surrendered two runs in the twelfth inning to allow the Braves to win 5–3.

With their offense slumping, the Nationals followed the loss to Atlanta with two more losses at Nationals Park to the Colorado Rockies. The three-game skid dropped the Nationals' record to 6–8, the first time they had been two games under .500 since May 15, 2015. The second loss to the Rockies dropped them to 2–8 in their past ten games; their last two such stretches had come in 2013 and 2015, the last two seasons in which they had not made the playoffs. The Nationals won on April 14 behind another gem by Scherzer—in which he gave up a two-run homer in the first inning but then retired the next 20 batters in a row before leaving the game after seven innings—but dropped the rubber game against Colorado the next day, with Doolittle serving up a go-ahead home run to Rockies outfielder and former Nationals shortstop Ian Desmond in the ninth inning to lose it. The Nationals went 0-for-8 with runners in scoring position in the game, falling 6–5 despite ten walks, a hit batter, three wild pitches, and a passed ball by Colorado, and the Nationals completed a disappointing 10-game home stand having gone 3–7. Scherzer was named National League Player of the Week for the period April 9–15, the fourth Player of the Week award of his career, and his second as a National, the previous one having come for the final week of the 2015 season.

The Nationals made several roster moves on April 16, optioning reliever Trevor Gott to the Class-AAA Syracuse Chiefs, placing catcher Jhonatan Solano on the 60-day disabled list, moving Cole to the bullpen, and activating pitcher Jeremy Hellickson to make his first start as a National in the game that evening against the Mets at Citi Field. Hellickson left the game in the fifth inning with his team trailing the Mets 2–1, and relievers Matt Grace and Cole proceeded to give up four runs between them, creating a five-run deficit by the eighth inning. However, the Nationals finally cracked deGrom after another dominant outing from the Mets ace and mounted a furious sustained rally, reeling off six runs against deGrom and the New York bullpen in the eight inning and adding a seventh unanswered run on a solo home run by the second baseman Kendrick in the ninth to stun the Mets 8–6 while delivering Cole his first win of the year. On April 17, the Nationals placed outfielder Brian Goodwin on the 10-day disabled list retroactive to April 16 due to a wrist injury he had had while fielding a ball the previous week and called up outfielder Andrew Stevenson from Syracuse. That evening, they clinched a series win over the Mets, winning 5–2, with Turner posting a standout defensive game at shortstop, evening their record at 9–9. On April 18, Zimmerman broke out of his early-season slump with two homers, a triple, and four RBIs, Roark gave up only two hits and two runs in seven innings of work, and the Nationals led 4–2 after 7 1/2 innings, but they missed a series sweep of the Mets thanks to a disastrous eighth inning in which the bullpen faced 12 batters and gave up nine runs. During the inning, Madson surrendered six runs on five hits and got only two outs; Sammy Solís relieved him and walked the only two batters he faced, walking in a run; and Cole took over and immediately gave up a grand slam to New York center fielder Yoenis Céspedes before getting the final out. The Mets went on to win 11–5, and the Nationals again fell below .500 on the season.

Cole, who had pitched to a 13.06 ERA in 10 1/3 innings of work for Washington, was designated for assignment on April 20. The Nationals selected the contract of veteran right-hander Carlos Torres from Class-AAA Syracuse the same day. That evening, the Nationals opened a series in Los Angeles against the Los Angeles Dodgers with a game that was promoted as probably the best pitching match-up of the 2018 regular season: It pitted two three-time Cy Young Award winners against each other as starting pitchers for only the tenth time in MLB history, in the form of Scherzer and Dodgers ace Clayton Kershaw. Struggling uncharacteristically, Kershaw quickly fell behind and ultimately allowed four runs to take the loss, with Scherzer outdueling the left-hander.

On April 21, the Nationals placed Grace on the 10-day disabled list with a groin injury and recalled Gott from Syracuse to replace him in the bullpen, and on April 22, they placed Rendon—who had not played since fouling a ball off his big toe on April 13, but had remained off the disabled list in the belief that it would heal quickly—on the 10-day disabled list and called up reliever Austin L. Adams from Syracuse. Meanwhile, they dropped the last two games of their series in Los Angeles against the Dodgers. Strasburg gave up two solo home runs on April 21 but lost what was otherwise a pitcher's duel to Los Angeles starter Hyun-Jin Ryu, who led the Dodgers in Washington's first shutout of the young season; the following evening, on ESPN's nationally televised Sunday night game, the Nationals held a 3–0 lead into the sixth inning behind a strong start by Hellickson before the Dodgers rallied to tie the game and then take the lead, winning 4–3 to drop the Nationals to 3–3 on their road trip and 10–12 on the season.

The Nationals' losing streak continued in San Francisco against the Giants, stretching to four before the visitors salvaged the last game of the three-game set. The turnover on the struggling team's roster continued, with Washington on April 24 placing reliever Shawn Kelley, who had given up a decisive home run to the Giants the previous evening, on the 10-day disabled list, making him the fourth National to go on the disabled list since the start of the road trip; on the same day, they optioned Matt Reynolds to Syracuse and called up outfielder Rafael Bautista and infielder Adrián Sánchez from their Class-AAA affiliate. The Nationals' offense exploded on April 25 with a season-high 18 hits, five of them authored by Turner in just the second five-hit game of his career, plus four by Stevenson, starting in left field and adding to his tally of just 10 major league hits coming into the game. The game ended with a 15–2 Washington victory that snapped the team's skid and marked a season high in runs scored for the team.

The Nationals returned to Nationals Park on April 27 to open a 10-day, 10-game homestand with a three-game series against the Arizona Diamondbacks. They lost the first two games of the series, using every reliever in their bullpen on April 28. On April 29, they optioned Adams, who had walked in the winning run on April 28, to Syracuse and called up pitcher Austin Voth from Syracuse. They won the final game of the Arizona series on April 29, and on April 30, they optioned Voth (who did not appear in a major league contest) back to Syracuse and called up right-handed reliever Wander Suero from the Chiefs. That evening, they closed out the month by opening a four-game series at Nationals Park against the Pittsburgh Pirates with a win, giving them back-to-back victories for the first time since April 16–17 and for only the third time since opening the season 4–0.

All told, the Nationals began April by completing a three-game sweep of the Reds, but with subsequent skids including a two-out-of-three series loss to the Braves on the road, a sweep by the Mets in their first home series of the season, a two-of-three loss to the Rockies at home, a West Coast swing in which they won just one game in three against both the Dodgers and the Giants, and a two-of-three loss to the visiting Diamondbacks. Aside from their sweep of the Reds, the Nationals' only series wins of the month were when they hosted the Braves in their second home series of the year and when they visited the Mets to begin their second roadtrip of the season. The Nationals finished April in fourth place in the National League East Division with a 13–16 record. Their 11–16 record in April made it their first losing month since a 12–17 performance in August 2015 and gave them their worst monthly winning percentage (.407) since they went 11–16 in July 2013. After a hot start, Bryce Harper found himself in a 5-for-35 slump at the end of April, but he finished the month with 38 walks on the season, the second-most walks in a season by April 30 in MLB history. (Note: Only Barry Bonds had walked more in one season by April 30, with 39 walks in 2004, a season which began on April 5. (See Janes, Chelsea, "Nationals find a way to hang on, but it still isn't easy against the Pirates," washingtonpost.com, April 30, 2018.)) Scherzer was named the National League Pitcher of the Month for April after running up a 1.62 ERA over 39 innings of work in the month and commanding the MLB lead in strikeouts with 57 and wins with five.

=== May ===
On May 1, for the second game of the Pittsburgh series, manager Dave Martinez decided to shake up the lineup by having right fielder Bryce Harper bat leadoff for the first time since 2013, hoping that it would give more at-bats and force opposing pitchers to pitch to him instead of routine walking him. The move paid off, as Harper broke out with his first home run in two weeks. With additional offense from left fielder Matt Adams and shortstop Trea Turner drove in three runs, the Nationals jumped out to a 12–2 lead behind another strong outing by starter Max Scherzer and hung on for a 12–4 win. Wander Suero, after 212 minor league games over eight seasons, made his major-league debut when he relieved Scherzer and pitched a scoreless two-thirds of an inning. The win gave the Nationals their first three-game winning streak since they opened the season 4–0 and improved their record to 14–16. The streak stretched to four, marking the first time they had had four consecutive victories since the first four games of the season, as starter Stephen Strasburg led the Nationals to a third win over the Pirates on May 2 with an 11-strikeout performance backed by Harper, Adams, and second baseman Howie Kendrick. The Nationals completed a four-game sweep of the Pirates on May 3, evening their record at 16–16 as closer Sean Doolittle converted his first five-out save in nearly three years. It was Washington's first five-game winning streak since early September 2017.

The Nationals welcomed the division-rival Philadelphia Phillies to Nationals Park on May 4 to begin a three-game series, winning the opener to edge above .500 for the first time since April 10 and activating third baseman Anthony Rendon from the 10-day disabled list, as he had recovered from a hairline fracture in his toe, on May 5. Infielder Adrián Sánchez was optioned to the Class-AAA Syracuse Chiefs in a corresponding move. However, the Nationals dropped the second game of the series to the Phillies, and the winning streak came to an end in a 3–1 loss that dropped the Nationals back to .500. The following afternoon saw a contest between the previous two Cy Young Award winners, Scherzer and Phillies starter Jake Arrieta; while Arrieta pitched well, allowing just one run on Adams' fifth homer of the month in his six innings of work, Scherzer had an historic game: By the fourth inning, he had already struck out 10 Phillies for the 69th game of his career with 10 or more strikeouts, at one point he struck out seven in a row, and he left the game after 6 1/3 innings with 15 strikeouts on 111 pitches, 71 of them strikes, his highest strikeout total in a game since his 20-strikeout complete game in May 2016, and he became the first MLB pitcher in history to strike out at least 15 batters in no more than 6 1/3 innings. Despite a Phillies rally, the Nationals struck back for their first walk-off win of the season, with second baseman Wilmer Difo singling home the winning run in the bottom of the ninth inning as Phillies closer Héctor Neris failed to record an out. The final score was 5–4, with Washington getting back over .500 with the victory.

The Nationals optioned outfielder Rafael Bautista to Syracuse on May 7 and activated right-handed reliever Shawn Kelley from the 10-day disabled list. They began a seven-game road trip that evening and took two out of three games from the San Diego Padres, climbing ahead of the fading New York Mets into third place in the National League East on May 8. They moved on to a four-game series at Arizona. After beating the Diamondbacks in their first extra-inning win of the season on May 10, they made a number of roster moves the next day, moving outfielder Adam Eaton—who had undergone arthroscopic surgery on his nagging ankle injury—from the 10-day disabled list to the 60-day disabled list retroactive to April 9, placing catcher Matt Wieters on the 10-day disabled list after he had a hamstring injury in the May 10 game, and calling up catcher Spencer Kieboom from Syracuse for his first taste of major league action since a solitary pinch-hit appearance in October 2016. Scherzer started on May 11 and struck out 11 Diamondbacks on 99 pitches over seven innings while driving in the deciding run on a ground-rule double in the fourth inning, as the Nationals won, 3–1, for the 11th time in 13 games and moved to 1 1/2 games out of first place in the National League East. After suffering a back injury in a game during the previous homestand, first baseman Ryan Zimmerman landed on the 10-day disabled list on May 12 with what the Nationals described as a right oblique strain, retroactive to May 10, as he was held out of several games on the roadtrip. The same day, they called up first baseman Mark Reynolds from Class-AAA Syracuse and moved right-handed pitcher Joaquín Benoit from the 10-day to the 60-day disabled list to make room on the 40-man roster for Reynolds. Reynolds did not play as the Nationals topped Arizona again on May 12 behind starter Jeremy Hellickson's bid for a perfect game, which he carried into the seventh inning while extending a scoreless streak to 12 1/3 innings. The right-handed slugger made his season debut in the final game of the four-game set, leading Washington to the rare four-game sweep on the road as he homered twice against his former team, including a go-ahead two-run shot in the eighth inning that gave the Nationals their winning margin in the 6–4 contest.

The Nationals experienced an unusually long layoff as a two-game homestand against the New York Yankees scheduled to start May 15 was rained out; the teams were able to begin the first game, which was suspended at a 3–3 tie midway through the fifth inning, but it was ultimately continued to June 18 as inclement weather prevented any further action. The first game of a three-game set at Nationals Park against the Los Angeles Dodgers was also rescheduled as part of a May 19 doubleheader. The time off did not appear to serve Washington well, as although rookie catcher Kieboom made his first career start and recorded his first major league hit in the first game of the day, the Nationals lost both ends of the doubleheader, as well as the services of stalwart utilityman Kendrick for the remainder of the season when he ruptured his Achilles tendon on a play in left field in the first game. After placing Kendrick on the disabled list in between games, the Nationals recalled infielder Adrián Sánchez from Class-AAA Syracuse as the 26th man, as well as right-handed pitcher Jefry Rodríguez from the Class-AA Harrisburg Senators in his first major league posting. The following day, Rodríguez was optioned back to Harrisburg without having appeared in a game, and the Nationals elected to promote outfielder Juan Soto from their Class-AA affiliate, designating outfielder Moisés Sierra—who had not notched a hit in nearly one month—for assignment. In earning the promotion, Soto completed a meteoric ascent to the major leagues, as the Nationals' 19-year-old second-ranked prospect had started the season with the Class-A Hagerstown Suns before making brief stopovers with the High-A Potomac Nationals and Class-AA Senators en route to Washington, amassing a .362 batting average with 14 home runs. Soto made his major league debut that evening, appearing as a pinch-hitter and striking out swinging as the Nationals were swept by the Dodgers, 7–2, following a poor outing by Washington's starter Strasburg. The three-game skid marked the Nationals' worst of the month, a disappointment exacerbated as the team lost another key player, setup man Ryan Madson, to the disabled list with a pectoral strain.

Soto and the Nationals fared better on May 21, as the teenage left fielder made his first career start and hit the first pitch he saw from San Diego Padres starter Robbie Erlin into the left field seats at Nationals Park for an opposite-field, three-run home run. (Note: Soto was the youngest player to hit a major league home run since teammate Bryce Harper, also as a 19-year-old rookie, in the 2012 Washington Nationals season. (See Boeck, Scott, "Kids bop: At 19, Nationals rookie Juan Soto has star company in home run club", USA Today, May 22, 2018)) Left-handed relief pitcher Tim Collins, whose contract was purchased from Class-AAA Syracuse to replace Madson in the bullpen—Kendrick was transferred to the 60-day disabled list to make room on the 40-man roster—also made his season debut in the May 21 game, appearing for the first time in a major league game since the 2014 World Series and pitching a scoreless inning with two strikeouts. The Nationals went on to thrash the Padres 10–2, then walked off over the visitors in the ninth inning 2–1 the following day as center fielder Michael A. Taylor doubled home Soto, who reached base in all four of his plate appearances, (Note: Soto became the youngest player since Harper in 2012, and only the second in 40 years, to walk three times in a major league game. (See Capps, Heath, "Add Juan Soto now!", Fake Teams, May 23, 2018)) for the winning run. However, they dropped the final game of the three-game series on May 23 as spot starter Erick Fedde, recalled for the day from Class-AAA Syracuse for his season debut and fourth career start, was outdueled by San Diego ace Tyson Ross. To make room for Fedde on the roster, the Nationals designated Carlos Torres for assignment after a string of mixed results for the veteran right-hander out of the bullpen. That bullpen spot was filled on May 25 as the Nationals selected the contract of 30-year-old right-hander Justin Miller from Syracuse.

Scherzer led the Nationals to a series-opening 9–5 win against the division-rival Miami Marlins at Marlins Park on May 25, despite giving up a season-high four runs and only striking out four Marlins in the game, with Adams and Taylor each providing a two-run home run to back the staff ace. The Nationals again rallied to win 4–1 on May 26, with the second baseman Difo homering off the left-field foul pole to tie the game in the eighth inning and the first baseman Reynolds putting the visitors on top for good in the ninth inning with a home run of his own. Miller, making his season debut and his first major league appearance since the 2016 season, earned the win in relief with a scoreless outing. The Nationals completed the sweep behind a five-inning start by Strasburg on May 27. Washington kept on rolling as it swept the Baltimore Orioles at Oriole Park at Camden Yards in a three-game interleague set that included two shutouts. Gio González pitched the Nationals to a 6–0 finish on May 28. The second game of the series on May 29 was a closer affair, finishing 3–2, but Hellickson was able to claim his first win of the year over his former team while Soto contributed with his first career three-hit game. (Note: Soto became the youngest player since Ken Griffey Jr. of the Seattle Mariners in 1989 to be intentionally walked, with Orioles manager Buck Showalter electing not to pitch to the rookie with a runner in scoring position in the eighth inning. (See Reddington, Patrick, "Washington Nationals' lineup for finale with Baltimore Orioles in OPACY: Juan Soto leads off vs O's...", Federal Baseball, May 30, 2018 and Castillo, Jorge, "Juan Soto was supposed to be two years away, but he's shown he belongs right now", The Washington Post, June 7, 2018)) Scherzer shut the Orioles down on May 30 in a 2–0 win to finish the sweep, scattering two hits and a walk over eight innings while striking out twelve. The six-game winning streak put them a half-game ahead of the Atlanta Braves for first place in the National League East Division for the first time since April 3.

Despite getting Madson back from his brief disabled-list stint on May 31, optioning fellow right-handed reliever Trevor Gott to Syracuse to make room on the active roster, the Nationals finished the month on a sour note as they were denied their twentieth victory of May by Sean Newcomb and the Atlanta Braves, who defeated Washington starter Tanner Roark in a 4–2 game at SunTrust Park to retake first place in the National League East. The Nationals thus finished May in second, a half-game behind Atlanta, with a 19–7 record for the month and a 32–23 record overall. All told, they recorded seven series wins in the month, four of them sweeps: a four-game sweep of the Pirates that began in April, another four-game sweep of the Diamondbacks, and back-to-back sweeps of three-game series against the Marlins and Orioles. They lost only one series in May, itself a three-game sweep at the hands of the visiting Dodgers. Scherzer was honored as National League Pitcher of the Month for the second month in a row, recording a 2.21 ERA for the month and leading the major leagues in May strikeouts with 63.

=== June ===
The month of June got off to a poor start for the Nationals as they were shut out for only the second time of the season by Atlanta Braves starter Mike Foltynewicz. A lethargic offense in the third game of the series on June 2 received a shot in the arm from 19-year-old left fielder Juan Soto, who homered to tie the game in the seventh inning, and then Max Scherzer, as the Nationals ace pinch-hit and singled in the fourteenth inning, then scored from first base on a triple by second baseman Wilmer Difo to give the Nationals a late lead. Catcher Spencer Kieboom also delivered with his first career RBI, driving in Difo to round out the 5–3 finish. The Nationals bullpen also contributed seven innings without allowing a baserunner, with reliever Justin Miller throwing a career-high three innings to earn the win. On the heels of the dramatic extra-innings victory, the Nationals placed reliever Tim Collins on paternity leave June 3 and recalled Jefry Rodríguez from the Class-AA Harrisburg Senators for the second time of the season to serve as a long reliever if necessary. As it turned out, the Nationals needed Rodríguez after starter Jeremy Hellickson exited in the first inning due to a hamstring injury on a play at first base. In his major league debut, Rodríguez contributed 4 2/3 innings while allowing just one run inherited from Hellickson. However, when manager Dave Martinez turned to starter Tanner Roark in the ninth inning with his bullpen severely depleted, Roark surrendered a two-run walk-off home run to Charlie Culberson, with the Braves winning 4–2.

The Nationals reinstated Collins from paternity leave and fellow left-handed reliever Matt Grace from the disabled list on June 5, optioning Rodríguez back to Class-AA Harrisburg and placing Hellickson on the 10-day disabled list with a right hamstring strain. That evening, Scherzer took the mound and earned his league-leading tenth win of the season against the Tampa Bay Rays in interleague play at Nationals Park, striking out thirteen Rays over eight innings—including three batters in a nine-pitch inning. (Note: Scherzer became the fifth major league pitcher to record the second immaculate inning of his career, and the first since Randy Johnson for the Arizona Diamondbacks on August 23, 2001, by striking out Johnny Field, Christian Arroyo, and Daniel Robertson in the sixth inning. He had previously pitched an immaculate inning against the Philadelphia Phillies on May 14, 2017. (See Dixon, Michael, "Scherzer joins Randy Johnson on exclusive list with second career immaculate inning", Yardbarker, June 5, 2018 and Mather, Victor, "Immaculate Inning: Yes, Max Scherzer Is That Good", The New York Times, June 6, 2018)) With Rays reliever Jonny Venters making his first career start on June 6, the Nationals hammered him for five runs in 1/3 innings en route to an 11–2 win and a sweep of the two-game set, with third baseman Anthony Rendon celebrating his 28th birthday with a four-hit performance. Washington suffered its second blow to the rotation in less than a week's time on June 8, as starter Stephen Strasburg struggled to a loss and exited after two innings with right shoulder discomfort in a home game against the San Francisco Giants. With Strasburg headed to the 10-day disabled list with shoulder inflammation, the Nationals also released injured outfielder Rafael Bautista from and optioned reliever Wander Suero to the Class-AAA Syracuse Chiefs on June 9, clearing roster space to activate outfielder Adam Eaton from the 60-day disabled list. The June 9 game was a Nationals victory also marked by the appearance of Lord Stanley's Cup before (and during) the game, presented by the Washington Capitals of the National Hockey League, who had won the 2018 Stanley Cup Final days earlier. However, it also saw starter Gio González struggle to his shortest outing of the season and setup man Brandon Kintzler suffer an arm injury that caused him to leave the game. Kintzler was placed on the disabled list with a right forearm flexor strain on June 10 along with Strasburg, and Suero and right-handed reliever Trevor Gott were recalled from Class-AAA Syracuse. Despite another strong start from Scherzer on June 10, the Nationals could not muster any offense against Derek Holland and the San Francisco bullpen, suffering their second shutout of June, as Giants shortstop Brandon Crawford supplied all the offense the visitors needed with a two-run homer off Scherzer in the 2–0 contest.

The Nationals activated infielder Daniel Murphy from the 10-day disabled list, optioning infielder Adrián Sánchez to Class-AAA Syracuse, to make his season debut as the designated hitter as they visited Yankee Stadium for a two-game interleague series with the New York Yankees on June 12. But even with Murphy and Eaton both in the lineup for the first time since April 2017, the Nationals' offensive woes continued as Yankees starter CC Sabathia led his team in a 3–0 blanking of the visitors despite a quality start turned in by Roark. Washington bounced back from the back-to-back shutouts the next game, however. With top pitching prospect Erick Fedde recalled from Class-AAA Syracuse to replace Strasburg in the rotation, Gott optioned back to Syracuse to make room, the Nationals rallied for a 5–4 victory behind their rookie left fielder Soto, who batted in four runs on two home runs in his first career multi-homer game. (Note: Soto became the youngest player to hit two home runs in a game since Andruw Jones of the Atlanta Braves on August 22, 1996, as well as the first teenager to hit two home runs at the new Yankee Stadium and the first teenager since Ken Griffey Jr. of the Seattle Mariners on May 30, 1989, to hit two home runs in a regular season game at any iteration of Yankee Stadium. (See Carroll, Charlotte, "19-Year-Old Juan Soto Makes History With Multi-HR Game", Sports Illustrated, June 13, 2018 and Harvey, Coley, "Juan Soto, 19, joins elite company with multihomer game in Bronx", ESPN.com, June 14, 2018)) Miller, celebrating his 31st birthday, notched his fourth win of the season with a scoreless relief outing, striking out four Yankees. The Nationals continued their tour of the American League East with a three-game series against the Toronto Blue Jays on the road, with Murphy again DHing and notching his first hit and RBI of the season in the series opener on June 15, although Miller also allowed his first run of the season on a homer by Blue Jays third baseman Yangervis Solarte that led Toronto to a 6–5 win over Washington. For the second straight Scherzer start, and the third time in five games, the Nationals were shut out on June 16 by former National Marco Estrada and the Blue Jays' bullpen. In a near-clone of the game the Nationals lost to the Giants on June 10, Scherzer surrendered a two-run home run to Blue Jays second baseman Devon Travis and received no run support as Toronto cruised from there to a 2–0 finish. It was the first time since August 2015 that Scherzer received losing decisions in back-to-back starts. The Blue Jays went on to sweep the series on June 17, 8–6, scoring the go-ahead run in the eighth inning on the first home run reliever Ryan Madson had allowed since June 2017, off the bat of Toronto left fielder Teoscar Hernández, which was immediately followed by another solo shot by the third baseman Solarte.

Resuming the suspended game against the Yankees at Nationals Park from May 15, the Nationals scored the eventual winning run on a statistical oddity, as Soto—pinch-hitting for left fielder Matt Adams—hit a two-run home run in a game that technically started five days before he made his major league debut. Washington and New York went on to split the June 18 twin-bill, with the Nationals winning the continuation of the May 15 game 5–3, as Suero earned his first career win in relief, and the Yankees pinning a loss on Fedde and the Nationals in the second game, which finished as a 4–2 loss despite a late rally in the ninth inning against closer Aroldis Chapman. In another unusual statistic, the Nationals went 0-for-11 with runners in scoring position in the second game, scoring both their runs on sacrifice flies by first baseman Mark Reynolds. During the latter game, the Nationals announced that they had swung an early midseason trade for Kansas City Royals closer Kelvin Herrera, trading infielder Kelvin Gutiérrez off their 40-man roster along with minor league outfielder Blake Perkins and minor league pitcher Yohanse Morel. Martinez confirmed after the game that incumbent closer Sean Doolittle, who finished out the first game of the day to notch his eighteenth save of the season, would retain his ninth-inning duties, with Herrera shifting into a new role with the Nationals. Herrera was activated the following day, with Suero optioned to Class-AAA Syracuse. Their injury woes continuing, the Nationals also listed Adams on the 10-day disabled list with a broken finger sustained on a bunt attempt in Toronto, recalling Rodríguez to make his first career start in place of the injured Hellickson, against the Orioles at Nationals Park. Rodríguez struggled, giving up five runs over five innings, but the Nationals rallied from a four-run deficit behind a four-hit day from shortstop Trea Turner, who came a triple from the cycle in the eventual 9–7 victory. Herrera also made his Nationals debut in the June 19 win, pitching a perfect eighth inning in relief. The Nationals were shut out by Andrew Cashner and the Orioles in the second game of the series, which finished early in the morning of June 21 after being interrupted by a rain delay of more than two hours, as the home team fell 3–0 in their fifth game of the month without pushing across a score. However, they rebounded behind another strong outing from Scherzer in the rubber match that evening, with Herrera picking up his first win as a National after his scoreless relief outing in the eighth inning of a tie game was followed by a two-run double by Soto, batting cleanup for the first time in his major league career, (Note: Soto was the youngest player, and first teenager, to bat fourth in a major league game since César Cedeño of the Houston Astros on June 22, 1970. (See Zuckerman, Mark, "With 'unbelievable poise,' Soto delivers from cleanup spot," masnsports.com, June 21, 2018)) that gave the Nationals their final 4–2 margin of victory. The win was Washington's 40th of the season.

The Nationals' offense was moribund for two and a half games against the division-rival Philadelphia Phillies, who were on the verge of a three-game sweep in Washington until the Nationals mounted a furious rally June 24 and into the early morning of June 25, in a game that was nationally televised by ESPN on Sunday Night Baseball. The home team stormed back from a four-run deficit with six unanswered runs in a hitting outburst keyed by Harper and Murphy, both of whom had been struggling at the plate throughout the month of June, along with Turner, Rendon, Soto, and center fielder Michael A. Taylor. The Nationals won 8–6 to salvage the series. However, the offensive resurgence did not last as the Nationals traveled to St. Petersburg, Florida, for a two-game interleague series against the Rays. The visitors were shut out in both games, with Scherzer suffering his third loss of the month without any run support to back a quality start on June 26 as the Nationals lost 1–0. The team did welcome back Kintzler, who was activated at the start of the Tampa Bay series as Rodríguez was optioned to Class-AAA Syracuse.

Following a series-opening loss to the Phillies at Citizens Bank Park on June 28, the Nationals rebounded in the second game on June 29, hitting a season-high seven home runs (Note: Juan Soto homered twice while tallying four hits in the June 29 game, becoming the first teenager in major league history to accomplish the feat in a game. (See "Juan Soto is the first teenager in @MLB history with a four-hit, two-homer game," twitter.com, June 29, 2018)) and scoring 17 runs to back Fedde in the rookie right-hander's first career win, topping their division rival Philadelphia by a 10-run margin. The Phillies were able to hold the Nationals in check in the third game of the four-game set, overcoming an early exit by starter Vince Velasquez after an Eaton line drive ricocheted off his pitching arm to win 4–3 and deal the first loss of the season to Hellickson, who was activated off the disabled list before the game—with reliever Sammy Solís being optioned to Class-AAA Syracuse, as the Nats also activated suspended catcher Raudy Read and optioned him to Syracuse, transferring injured first baseman Ryan Zimmerman from the 10-day disabled list to the 60-day disabled list in a corresponding move.

The end of June marked the mathematical halfway point at which the Nationals had played 81 of their 162 scheduled regular-season games in 2018. Washington finished June with a 9–16 win–loss record (not counting the continuation of the May 15 game versus the Yankees), their worst record in a full calendar month since June 2010, and three games above .500 at 42–39. They sat in third place in the National League East Division, five games behind the first-place Braves. All told, they completed a one-win-in-four losing set visiting the Braves to start June, swept a two-game series against the Rays at home, dropped two of three to the visiting Giants, split a two-game series with the Yankees on the road, got swept by the Blue Jays in three games in Toronto, won the continuation of the game from May against the Yankees at home before losing the second game, took two of three from the visiting Orioles, lost two of three to the visiting Phillies, suffered a two-game shutout sweep by the Rays in St. Petersburg, then lost two of three to start their four-game series with the Phillies on the road to end the month. Soto was honored with the National League Rookie of the Month Award for his performance in June.

=== July ===
The Nationals opened the month of July with another loss to the Philadelphia Phillies to drop three out of four in the series that began the previous month. The game dragged into the thirteenth inning before pinch-hitter Andrew Knapp homered off reliever Justin Miller, giving Miller just his first losing decision of the 2018 season. The loss put them six games out of first in the National League East Division. Washington dropped the first of a three-game series with the visiting Boston Red Sox on July 2, as ace Max Scherzer gave up a bases-clearing double to Red Sox pitcher Rick Porcello and, despite solo home runs from third baseman Anthony Rendon, first baseman Daniel Murphy (his first of the season), and center fielder Bryce Harper and four appearances on base for left fielder Juan Soto, (Note: Soto walked three times in the game for the second time in the season, becoming the first teenager with two such games since Rusty Staub for the Houston Colt .45s in 1963. (See Kamka, Christopher, "Most 3-walk games by a teenager," twitter.com, July 2, 2018)) the Nationals could not recapture the lead. Although Scherzer recovered to record a quality start, the Red Sox handed him the loss in the 4–3 contest, extending to five a string of quality starts for the Nationals pitcher in which he did not receive enough run support to win. The Nationals were ultimately swept by the Red Sox, as July 3 starter Tanner Roark gave up nine runs in a blowout loss and July 4 starter Erick Fedde, who took the ball for the Nationals' traditional morning game at home on Independence Day, exited in the second inning after experiencing a 15-mph drop in velocity on his sinker in the start after he threw 115 pitches on June 30 to earn his first career win; the home team went on to a 3–0 shutout at the hands of the Red Sox, with hitters providing long reliever Matt Grace and the rest of the Nationals bullpen no run support. The Independence Day game ended with Matt Adams, who had been activated from the disabled list that morning (reliever Tim Collins was designated for assignment in a corresponding move), standing in the on-base circle to pinch-hit as the potential go-ahead run as Boston closer Craig Kimbrel induced a popout from second baseman Wilmer Difo. After the game, Scherzer called a players-only meeting in an attempt to rally a team that fell below .500 for the first time since early May with the loss.

Fedde was placed on the 10-day disabled list with what the team called right shoulder inflammation on July 5, and right-handed pitcher Jefry Rodríguez was recalled from the Class-AAA Syracuse Chiefs to replace him on the roster. The Nationals reportedly considered having Rodríguez start in place of Jeremy Hellickson, who was sick, in the July 5 game to open a series with the visiting division-rival Miami Marlins, but manager Dave Martinez opted to have Hellickson make the start. Although Hellickson gave up seven runs in the first two innings, Martinez did not replace him in the game with Rodríguez until the fifth inning, by which time Hellickson had surrendered two more. The Nationals began chipping away at the lead in the fourth inning as shortstop Trea Turner homered to right, then added four more in the fifth in a rally that saw Rodríguez replaced with a pinch-hitter after just an inning of work. Following a Murphy sacrifice fly in the sixth that narrowed the Nationals' deficit to three runs, Turner hit his second home run of the game and his first career grand slam off Miami reliever Adam Conley to give the home team an improbable lead. The Nationals tacked on four more runs in the seventh inning (Note: Two of those runs were driven in by Turner for his seventh and eighth RBIs of the game, tying a major league record for most runs batted in by a leadoff hitter in a game. (See Mears, Stephen, "Trea Turner leads his team in this historical win from 9 runs down!," TalkNats.com, July 5, 2018)) and held on to survive a late Marlins rally against relievers Miller and Kelvin Herrera, winning 14–12 as closer Sean Doolittle struck out Marlins left fielder Derek Dietrich for the save. The comeback in the game was the largest in team history. (Note: The previous team record had been an eight-run deficit from which Washington rallied to victory at Turner Field against the Atlanta Braves on April 28, 2015. The last time a major league team had come back to win after trailing by nine or more runs was when the Seattle Mariners defeated the San Diego Padres in interleague play on June 2, 2016. (See Simon, Andrew and Manny Randhawa, "Did you know: Nats' surreal comeback", MLB.com, June 5, 2018)) Offense in the July 6 game was relatively quieter, with the teams battling through eight and a half innings while scoring just two runs apiece before pinch-hitter Mark Reynolds led off the bottom of the ninth with a home run against Marlins closer Kyle Barraclough, giving the Nationals a walk-off 3–2 win. It was the Nationals' first walk-off home run of the season, lifting them back above the .500 mark on the season, and it provided the team with its second win in a row, for the first time in more than a month. Starting at first base on July 7, Reynolds went 5-for-5 with two home runs and 10 runs batted in to tie the franchise record for RBIs in a game. (Note: The franchise record equaled by Reynolds had previously been set by Anthony Rendon, who went 6-for-6 and drove in 10 RBIs against the New York Mets on April 30, 2017. Reynolds was the first major league player to bat in 10 runs in a game since Scooter Gennett for the Cincinnati Reds on June 6, 2017. With the feat, following teammate Trea Turner's eight-RBI outing on July 5, 2018, Reynolds and Turner became the first teammates to record games with eight or more runs batted in during the same week. (See Melnick, Kyle, "Reynolds tallies 10 RBIs as Nats make history", MLB.com, July 7, 2018)) The Nationals won the game, 18–4, delivering Scherzer his first win in more than a month. The Nationals' MLB-leading streak of 14 consecutive wins against the Marlins dating back to the 2017 season was snapped July 8 as Miami got to the struggling Roark and Washington's weary relief corps while holding the Nationals to just two runs on five hits. The Marlins won 10–2, with Martinez finally inserting a position player in to pitch in the ninth inning: Reynolds, who made his major league debut as a pitcher after starting at third base (to which catcher Spencer Kieboom switched for the first time in his professional career) and retired the only batter he faced on a groundout to the first baseman Adams. Reynolds was named the National League's Player of the Week for his heroics during the Marlins series.

Washington returned catcher Matt Wieters from the disabled list on July 9, optioning catcher Pedro Severino, who had struggled both offensively and in working with the Nationals pitching staff while filling in for Wieters, to Class-AAA Syracuse. Despite the return of Wieters, the Nationals dropped their series opener at PNC Park against the Pittsburgh Pirates that day, as Rodríguez turned in yet another rocky start, giving up six runs in his first two innings of work. That was all the Pirates needed, as they cruised to a 6–3 finish to drop the Nationals back down to a .500 record at 45 wins and 45 losses for the season. With their bullpen virtually exhausted, the Nationals optioned Rodríguez the next morning while also assigning Doolittle—named days earlier alongside Harper and Scherzer as the Nationals' representatives at the 2018 All-Star Game—to the 10-day disabled list with what was described as right toe inflammation; they called up right-handed pitchers Wander Suero and Austin Voth from Class-AAA Syracuse to replace them on the roster. Martinez indicated Herrera would take over closing duties while Doolittle was out, and Doolittle confirmed he would not participate in the All-Star Game due to the injury. Neither Suero nor Voth saw game action in Pittsburgh, as the Nationals proceeded to win 5–1 behind five scoreless innings from a healthy Hellickson on July 10 and lose 2–0 on July 11, their ninth time being shut out since the start of June, despite a quality start from Gio González and strong relief work by Miller and resurgent right-hander Shawn Kelley. With the failure to take at least two of three against the Pirates, the Nationals again fell back to .500 on the season with just one more series, a four-game set with the division-rival New York Mets, before the All-Star Game. The Nationals won the first game of that series of July 12 behind Scherzer and home runs from Rendon and Harper, with usual setup man Ryan Madson locking down the save, but dropped the second as Roark gave up four runs in his first two innings of work and the Nationals' woes hitting with runners in scoring position continued. Roark himself scored one of the Nationals' two runs in the 4–2 loss after hitting the first triple by a Washington pitcher in more than a decade. (Note: Prior to Roark's triple on July 13, the most recent pitcher to triple in franchise history was Joel Hanrahan on July 28, 2007, also against the New York Mets. Roark was also the first pitcher in the 2018 Major League Baseball season to record a triple. (See Clair, Michael and Joe Trezza, "Tanner Roark hit a gloriously bizarre pitcher triple past Brandon Nimmo," Cut 4, July 13, 2018)) Voth was tabbed to make his major league debut as the starter in the July 14 game, and while he earned his first major league strikeout against the first batter he faced in Mets center fielder Brandon Nimmo, he gave up three runs in the second inning and four more in the fifth to take the loss in the 7–4 contest. The Nationals salvaged a split to head into the All-Star Break with a .500 record, at 48 wins to 48 losses, as Hellickson turned in a quality start and was backed up by the Nationals' bats as he earned the win on July 15, 6–1 over the Mets.

Despite a successful All-Star Break in which Harper won the Home Run Derby and Scherzer started the All-Star Game (for the second consecutive year) in front of thousands of Washington fans at Nationals Park, the Nationals stumbled out of the blocks in the second half. Starting pitcher Stephen Strasburg and first baseman Ryan Zimmerman were activated from the disabled list for the start of a series in Washington against the division-rival Atlanta Braves, with Suero and Gott being optioned to Class-AAA Syracuse to make room on the roster. But in the July 20 game, Strasburg was flat, exiting in the fifth inning after allowing six runs and appearing to argue with Scherzer in the dugout afterward, and Zimmerman grounded out in his sole plate appearance of the game as a pinch-hitter. The Braves won 8–5 despite a late two-run home run by Soto. (Note: Soto and Atlanta left fielder Ronald Acuña Jr. were the first opposing players under the age of 21 since Egyptian Healy of the Indianapolis Hoosiers and Mike Tiernan of the New York Giants on May 19, 1887, to homer in the same game. (See Hill, David, "Atlanta Braves, Washington Nationals youngsters make history", Call to the Pen, July 21, 2018)) The Nationals and Braves did not play on July 21 due to rain, with the game rescheduled as part of a split doubleheader. On July 22, the team made two significant announcements: Doolittle suffered a setback while ramping up to return from his toe injury, and the "stress reaction" in his foot would sideline him for several more weeks, and backup outfielder Brian Goodwin was traded to the Kansas City Royals for minor league reliever Jacob Condra-Bogan, with left-hander Sammy Solís recalled to take Goodwin's roster spot and fill out a seven-man bullpen for the Nationals. Goodwin's spot on the 40-man roster was filled by former Nationals closer Koda Glover, who was activated from the 60-day disabled list and optioned to Syracuse after rehabbing from shoulder inflammation. The Nationals defeated the Braves that day 6–2, with Scherzer turning in another quality start and Herrera notching a five-out save.

The Nationals dropped another series opener on the road to the Milwaukee Brewers on July 23 as González struggled. Mired in an offensive slump, in one of his plate appearances, Turner bunted back to pitcher Jhoulys Chacin, then threw his bat, helmet, and batting gloves to the ground in apparent disgust before walking back toward the dugout without ever moving toward first base, for which he was called out by home plate umpire Nic Lentz. Martinez benched Turner for the following game due to his failure to run out the ball, although he did appear late as a pinch-runner. The Major League Baseball Players Alumni Association announced July 24 that Turner had been awarded the annual "Heart and Hustle" award for the Nationals, a bit of irony that did not pass without comment from the Washington sports media. Despite an early four-run cushion, which included a three-run home run by right fielder Adam Eaton, and four strong innings from Hellickson, the Nationals dropped the July 24 game as Hellickson labored through the fifth inning, giving up three runs, and reliever Brandon Kintzler blew the slimmed-down lead altogether in the seventh inning. The Brewers ultimately walked off 5–4 in the tenth inning, as shortstop Tyler Saladino plated the winning run on a sacrifice fly off Grace. The Nationals salvaged a win in the three-game series by taking the final game on July 25, benefiting from Roark's best start of the year as he pitched eight scoreless innings while striking out 11 Brewers, earning his first win in eight starts.

On July 26, the Nationals announced that Strasburg was returning to the 10-day disabled list after just one start, citing a pinched nerve in his neck. Rendon also temporarily departed the team on three-day paternity leave. The Nationals selected the contract of left-handed pitcher Tommy Milone, who had made his major league debut with the Nationals in the 2011 season and re-signed with the organization on a minor league deal over the winter, and recalled utilityman Matt Reynolds to take the place of Strasburg and Rendon on the roster. First baseman and outfielder José Marmolejos, who had spent the entire season to date with Class-AAA Syracuse, was designated from assignment to clear a spot on the 40-man roster for Milone. Starting in Strasburg's place to begin another four-game series in Miami, Milone gave up three runs in the first inning but settled in to pitch four more scoreless innings, getting a no-decision in what ended up as a 10–3 Nationals win, as the visitors' offense stirred to life late, keyed by Turner batting in three runs and coming a double shy of hitting for the cycle and Soto reaching base four times while hitting his 12th home run of the season. (Note: Two of Soto's plate appearances were intentional walks, making him the first teenager in the major leagues since Robin Yount of the Milwaukee Brewers in 1975 to be intentionally walked twice in one game. He also tied Ed Kranepool for the seventh-most home runs by a teenager in major league history. (See Reddington, Patrick, "Washington Nationals rally for 10-3 win over Miami Marlins in series opener in Florida...", Federal Baseball, July 26, 2018, and "Turner's 3 RBIs Lead Nationals Over Marlins 10-3", The New York Times, July 26, 2018)) Washington climbed above the .500 mark for the first time in nearly two weeks on July 27. Scherzer pitched eight innings while giving up just one unearned run and striking out 11 Marlins, the last of whom was Justin Bour for the Nationals ace's 200th strikeout of the season. (Note: Scherzer matched Roger Clemens and Walter Johnson with his seventh consecutive season of 200 strikeouts or more, a three-way tie for third place behind Tom Seaver's nine consecutive 200-strikeout seasons. (See Spencer, Clark, "Marlins receive a taste of the real Max Scherzer, and it wasn't pleasant", Miami Herald, July 27, 2018)) It was Soto's turn in the July 27 game to come a double shy of the cycle, as he homered, singled, and hit his first career triple in the contest. (Note: Soto tied Mickey Mantle of the New York Yankees, who homered 13 times in his age-19 rookie season in 1951, for the sixth-most home runs by a teenager in major league history. He also recorded his third consecutive game with a home run, the first time a teenager had accomplished the feat in the major leagues since Jimmy Sheckard for the Brooklyn Bridegrooms on May 3, 1898. (See Frank, Vincent, "Watch: Nationals' Juan Soto ties Mickey Mantle on HR list", Yardbarker, July 27, 2018, and Rollins, Khadrice, "Watch: Juan Soto Becomes First Teenager in Modern Era to Homer in Three Straight Games", Sports Illustrated, July 27, 2018)) However, the Nationals' winning ways did not continue over the final two games of the series. Washington wasted a quality start by González on July 28, scoring just one run in the ninth inning in an extra-innings loss, and then were shut out in a two-hit effort by José Ureña and the Marlins relief corps on July 29, dropping the visitors back below .500.

With a losing record heading into the July 31 trade deadline and a disappointing split against the fourth-place Marlins, the Nationals faced widespread speculation in the media that they could become sellers. Although general manager Mike Rizzo acknowledged that he fielded trade proposals from different teams for a number of players—including Harper, the Nationals' All-Star center fielder and highest-paid position player—the team ultimately remained largely inactive. On July 31, the team announced it traded Kintzler to the Chicago Cubs for minor league reliever Jhon Romero—a move team officials characterized as largely a roster-clearing move similar to the trade of Goodwin to Kansas City days earlier, although The Washington Post suggested it may have been motivated by Kintzler's outspokenness. With Suero recalled to replace Kintzler in the bullpen and Rendon activated from the family medical leave list to replace Matt Reynolds, who was optioned back to Syracuse, the Nationals proceeded to rack up a franchise-record 25 runs on 26 hits in a drubbing of the division-rival New York Mets at Nationals Park. Winning by 21 runs in the 25–4 contest, the Nationals dealt the Mets their largest ever loss by run differential and scored their largest in franchise history. (Note: The Nationals' 25 runs were the most by a team playing in the National League since August 18, 1995, when the Chicago Cubs defeated the Colorado Rockies 26–7. After five innings, the Nationals had scored 19 runs in what was then a shutout, the first time that a major league team had scored that many runs while allowing none over five innings since May 13, 1876, when the Hartford Dark Blues scored 21 runs through five while shutting out the New York Mutuals en route to a win. They were only the 10th team since the 1900 season to score 25 or more runs in a game. (See Evans, Jace, "Nationals historic in 21-run demolition that leaves Mets with worst loss ever", USA Today, July 31, 2018, and "Nationals win 25-4 to hand Mets worst loss in franchise history", ABC 7 NY, July 31, 2018)) Six of the Nationals' runs came against José Reyes, normally a utility infielder for the Mets, in his major league pitching debut in the eighth inning. Reyes needed 48 pitches to complete the inning, allowing two home runs, a triple, a double, a single, two walks, and a hit-by-pitch before retiring the side. The game was also marked by a new Nationals–Expos franchise record for hits, as Zimmerman surpassed former Montreal Expos star Tim Wallach by tallying his 1,695th hit in the organization as he singled in a run in the first inning. Despite the historic win, the night was soured somewhat for the Nationals as Kelley, who gave up three runs after called upon to finish off the game in the ninth inning, reacted after an Austin Jackson home run by spiking his glove on the grass next to the mound and appearing to glare toward the Nationals' dugout. Kelley apologized after the game and said he was frustrated by what he saw as conflicting orders from the umpiring crew as he was trying to pitch.

After taking the first of two games against the Mets at home, the Nationals finished July with a 53–53 record of wins and losses for the season, with a losing record of 11–14 for the month, having won just one series (against the Marlins) in July. They stood in third place in the National League East Division, in 5 1/2 games behind the first-place Phillies and five games back of the second-place Braves. Soto earned his second straight Rookie of the Month Award for July after hitting .299, batting in 15 runs, and swatting five home runs in the month.

=== August ===
The Nationals opened the month of August by summarily designating reliever Shawn Kelley for assignment, which manager Dave Martinez and general manager Mike Rizzo directly attributed to his outburst during the previous game on July 31, in which he appeared to glare toward the team dugout after throwing his glove. Speaking both of the decision to designate Kelley, whose behavior he called "selfish" and "disrespectful" toward Martinez, and trade former Nationals reliever Brandon Kintzler to the Chicago Cubs the day before, Rizzo declared, "If you're not in, you're in the way." The Nationals selected the contract of right-handed relief prospect Jimmy Cordero to fill the roster spot vacated by Kelley, who was traded days later to the Oakland Athletics for international bonus slot money. The Nationals went on to beat the New York Mets on August 1 to complete a two-game series sweep in a midday game at Nationals Park, opening August with a win as left-handed starter Tommy Milone struck out nine Mets, outdueled Mets right-hander Noah Syndergaard, and earned his first major league decision and win since April 2017, while making only his second start of the season with the Nationals. The Nationals won the August 1 game 5–3 to climb back above the .500 mark for the season.

Carrying some momentum into a four-game series with the Cincinnati Reds at home, the Nationals batted around in the second inning (Note: Nineteen-year-old left fielder Juan Soto walked twice in the inning out of three total walks in the game, tying Rusty Staub for the all-time record for three-walk games as a teenager with three. (See Janes, Chelsea, "Nationals keep building, stretch winning streak to three by thumping Reds, 10-4", The Washington Post, August 2, 2018)) and rode another quality start from ace Max Scherzer to a 10–4 win on August 2. Cordero made his major league debut in the contest, allowing two runs in the ninth inning before finishing out the win. Rain postponed the second game of the series to August 4, on which it was played as a doubleheader, in which the Reds hammered struggling Nationals starter Gio González and held the Nationals to a single run to win the first game, but the Nationals struck back behind a strong effort from starter Jeremy Hellickson and a much more productive offense (Note: Soto tallied a pair of hits in each game to become the first teenager since Robin Yount for the Milwaukee Brewers on September 13, 1975, with multiple hits in each game of a major league doubleheader. (See Kerr, Byron, "Hellickson on his cutter; Soto on success in both games of twinbill", masnsports.com, August 5, 2018)) to win the second game. Washington completed a second straight series win by topping Cincinnati 2–1 on August 5, with Tanner Roark turning in a third straight quality start and catcher Matt Wieters homering for the first time since his return from the disabled list in early July.

Facing the division-rival Atlanta Braves in a potentially pivotal four-game series starting July 7, the Nationals split the opening doubleheader with the visitors. In the day game, spot starter Jefry Rodríguez pitched five solid innings, notched his first major league hit (a double), and earned his first major league win, with rookie left fielder Juan Soto walking three times for the fourth time all season to set a new major league record for three-walk games by a teenager. Reliever Greg Holland, signed out of free agency after his release by the St. Louis Cardinals days earlier, made his Nationals debut in the first game of the day, striking out three Braves; Cordero was optioned back to the Class-AAA Syracuse Chiefs in a corresponding move for Holland. However, the Nationals also lost a reliever, as closer Kelvin Herrera exited the second game with a shoulder injury and was placed on the 10-day disabled list the following day. The team recalled right-handed reliever Koda Glover from Syracuse to replace Herrera on the roster, announcing erstwhile setup man Ryan Madson would take over closing duties temporarily. The Nationals proceeded to lose the third game of the series that evening to the Braves. Soto was ejected by the home plate umpire, Greg Gibson, before his third at-bat of the day, with Gibson claiming Soto had continued to argue a called third strike from the previous at-bat as his justification for ordering him to leave the game. It was Soto's first career ejection. Martinez and hitting coach Kevin Long argued the decision, but of the two, only Long was ejected as well. Washington rallied for a series split on August 9 behind a resurgent outing from González, who earned his first winning decision in 12 starts.

The Nationals endured their first series loss since the non-waiver trade deadline as they locked horns with the Chicago Cubs in a three-game set at Wrigley Field, the teams' first meeting since the 2017 National League Division Series. Continuing a running theme for him throughout the season, Hellickson cruised through the Cubs' lineup for the first two times through the order in the August 10 series opener, only to immediately struggle when asked to pitch to opposing batters for the third time; carrying a no-hitter into the sixth inning, he lost a 13-pitch battle against Chicago leadoff hitter Anthony Rizzo, walking him, then walked the next two batters on eight straight balls before being relieved by Sammy Solís, who immediately gave up a game-tying RBI single. In the seventh inning, Solís combined with Holland to load the bases, and then Rizzo walked again to force home the go-ahead run. The Cubs held on to win 3–2. The visitors rebounded to win on August 11 behind another outstanding start by Roark, although the Cubs tacked on three runs in the eighth and ninth inning against Roark and reliever Wander Suero for a 9–4 finish. However, the series was capped with what The Washington Post described as one of the Nationals' "worst ever" losses in team history. On ESPN's Sunday Night Baseball broadcast, Scherzer outdueled a strong Cole Hamels, as the Nationals enjoyed seven scoreless innings from their ace plus a scoreless eighth by Glover. With the team up by three runs entering the ninth inning, Madson was called upon to record the save. Instead, after loading the bases via an infield single bobbled by defensive substitute Wilmer Difo and two hits-by-pitch, Madson surrendered a two-out, two-strike walk-off grand slam to rookie pinch-hitter David Bote. (Note: It was the first time since May 17, 1996, when Chris Hoiles did it for the Baltimore Orioles against the Seattle Mariners, that a so-called "Golden Homer", a walkoff grand slam with the team trailing by three runs and down to its final strike, had been hit in a major league game. It also was the first time since May 23, 1936, when Sammy Byrd accomplished the feat for the Cincinnati Reds against the Pittsburgh Pirates, that a batter had hit a game-winning grand slam while trailing 3–0 in the ninth inning. It was the first time ever that a walkoff grand slam had been hit in a 3–0 game with two outs in the inning. (See Baer, Jack, "Cubs break Nationals' hearts with walk-off win that hasn't been seen in two decades", Yahoo! Sports, August 12, 2018, and Fominykh, Katherine, "Cubs' David Bote's kind of walkoff grand slam hasn't been done since the 1996 Orioles", The Baltimore Sun, August 13, 2018)) After the game, Madson said he had been experiencing shooting pain in his back and right leg and had been unable to grip the ball well enough to throw his signature curveball, but he had not disclosed his condition to the coaching staff previously.

The trying tour of the National League Central Division continued as the Nationals dropped the first three out of four games to the St. Louis Cardinals at Busch Stadium. On August 13, in the first game of the series the Nationals were again unable to hold a late lead. With the Nationals up by two runs, reliever Justin Miller gave up a home run to start the eighth inning. One out later, Solís was summoned with a runner on base to face a pinch-hitter, but he promptly gave up a single and wild pitch, then surrendered a go-ahead home run to Cardinals slugger Matt Carpenter, the league leader in home runs, with first base open. Although the Nationals mounted a ninth-inning rally to tie the game, they were unable to take the lead, stranding two runners in scoring position, before Paul DeJong led off the bottom of the ninth with a home run off Glover, handing Washington its second walk-off loss in as many games. "I don't know what else to do," Martinez admitted after the game. Before the second game of the series on August 14, the Nationals removed both Madson and Solís from their active roster, placing the former on the 10-day disabled list with what the team called "lumbar nerve root irritation" and optioning the latter to Class-AAA Syracuse. For the second time of the season, Washington selected the contract of veteran left-handed reliever Tim Collins from Syracuse, also calling up right-handed reliever Trevor Gott. Injured starting pitcher Erick Fedde was transferred to the 60-day disabled list to complete the series of roster moves. Martinez announced that, despite giving up the walk-off home run the previous night, Glover would assume closing duties for the time being, with Miller expected to fill in when Glover, still readjusting to the major leagues after a series of shoulder and back injuries, was unavailable for a game. Both Collins and Gott appeared in the August 14 game after González was unable to work into the fifth inning, the Nationals' starter notably giving up a two-run home run to opposing pitcher John Gant for the Cardinals' right-hander's first career hit; Gott gave up one run on a Kolten Wong home run in long relief and Collins threw a scoreless inning. The Cardinals stymied a late Nationals rally to win 6–4. The Nationals had injury added to insult as Hellickson was forced to exit early in his August 15 start after falling awkwardly on his wrist during a play at the plate; the Cardinals won the game 4–2, and Hellickson headed to the disabled list for the second time in the season. The Nationals salvaged one win for the series on August 16, topping the Cardinals 5–4 behind a six-inning start from Roark, a three-RBI game by Harper, and the first save of the year for Glover.

Returning home for a three-game series against the division-rival Miami Marlins, the Nationals rode a strong start by Scherzer to an easy 8–2 victory on August 17, only to end up stumbling to their first series loss at home against Miami since the 2014 season as they dropped the second two games. Washington lost on August 18 as, despite a ninth-inning Adam Eaton home run to tie the game, the Nationals were unable to plate the winning run and Glover promptly surrendered two runs to take the loss in the tenth inning; The next day, Marlins starter José Ureña hurled a complete game, giving up just one run on two hits, as Miami's offense buried Nationals starter González and long reliever Milone in the 12–1 blowout. Milone's reassignment to the bullpen was among several roster moves involving pitchers that the Nationals made during the opening series of their homestand, formally assigning Hellickson to the 10-day disabled list with a right wrist sprain on August 18, calling up Rodríguez from Syracuse to join the rotation, and swapping Gott for Cordero via optional assignment.

The Nationals made more moves on August 21. In what both local and national media widely characterized as "throwing in the towel" or "waving the white flag" after a disappointing season, Washington traded starting second baseman Daniel Murphy and backup first baseman Matt Adams to the Cubs and Cardinals respectively, teams whose recent wins over the Nationals had rendered their odds of reaching the postseason bleak, according to analysts. Despite losing the veteran infielders, who were claimed off waivers, the Nationals rode key hits by outfielder Andrew Stevenson, recalled from Class-AAA Syracuse in a related move, and second baseman Wilmer Difo, assuming everyday duties from Murphy, to win on August 21 in the opening game of a series against the division-rival Philadelphia Phillies. Stevenson hit his first career home run, a two-run pinch-hit blast that tied the game, and Cordero earned his first career win in relief, with Herrera wrapping up the 10–4 win hours after being activated from the disabled list as Milone was listed with left shoulder soreness. Long reliever Matt Grace also singled for his first career hit in the game. The following night, the Nationals overcame the struggles of just-reactivated starter Stephen Strasburg and bounced back from a one-run deficit to stun the Phillies on first baseman Ryan Zimmerman's eleventh career walk-off home run, a bomb to right field that scored Soto from second base. Philadelphia closer Seranthony Domínguez, who surrendered the blast, took the loss. Zimmerman's walk-off home run turned out to be the last time the Nationals scored for 32 innings, as they were shut out three games in a row (by the Phillies behind Aaron Nola, by the Mets behind Jason Vargas, and by the Mets behind Zack Wheeler) for the first time in Nationals team history, wasting strong starts by Scherzer, González, and Roark along the way. Washington salvaged the series in Queens with a 15–0 win on August 26, with an offensive outburst coming in the eighth and ninth innings as Rodríguez led a superb effort by the visitors' pitching staff. However, the Nationals lost Herrera to another injury, as the reliever came up lame taking a groundout to first base for the 26th out of the game. Herrera was placed on the disabled list the next day with a torn Lisfranc ligament in his left foot, an injury expected to end his season, and Madson was activated from the disabled list. Martinez said the team would rely on matchups rather than designating a set closer; that night, with Madson playing the role of setup man, Miller recorded his first save since the 2015 season, and on August 28, Holland earned his first save of the season as well, as Washington took the first two of three against the Phillies at Citizens Bank Park.

Two days after the Phillies stunned the Nationals in the series finale by coming back from a three-run deficit using a Carlos Santana grand slam home run off González, the Nationals agreed to trade González to the Milwaukee Brewers for prospects KJ Harrison and Gilbert Lara, with the news breaking in the first inning as the Brewers visited Nationals Park on August 31. The Nationals also traded Madson to the Los Angeles Dodgers the same day for minor league pitcher Andrew Istler. The Brewers topped the Nationals 4–1, repeatedly stifling the home team's scoring opportunities throughout the game.

The Nationals finished August with a 67–68 record on the season, posting a losing record for the third month in a row as they went 14–15. After finishing out a two-game sweep of the Mets, then winning three of four from the Reds, the Nationals split four games with the Braves, lost two of three to the Cubs and three of four to the Cardinals on the road, returned home and lost two of three to the Marlins before winning two of three against the Phillies, then dropped two of three visiting the Mets and won two of three visiting the Phillies, prior to losing their final game of August against the Brewers. They sat 7 1/2 games back of the division-leading Braves.

=== September ===
With rosters expanding for the final month of the season, the Nationals made their first set of moves on September 1, recalling catcher Pedro Severino from the Class-AAA Syracuse Chiefs and selecting the contract of Chiefs reliever Austen Williams. Neither of the new call-ups played in the Nationals' first game of the month, the second in a three-game series at Nationals Park against the Milwaukee Brewers. That game began in the evening of September 1, but a lengthy mid-game rain delay meant it did not finish until the early morning on September 2. Trailing by two runs when the rain delay started in the eighth inning, the Nationals rallied behind two-out RBI singles from shortstop Trea Turner and rookie left fielder Juan Soto to take the lead, with reliever Justin Miller locking down the save to complete the come-from-behind victory. In the rubber game, played the afternoon of September 2, the Nationals jumped out to an early two-run lead but couldn't hold it. After battling command issues all game, starter Jefry Rodríguez put two runners on base in the fifth inning before giving up a three-run home run to Keon Broxton that turned the tide of the contest and gave Milwaukee the lead; two batters later, manager Dave Martinez summoned reliever Tim Collins, who loaded the bases with a four-pitch walk before Christian Yelich hit a grand slam out to center field to ice the game. All seven runs in the fifth inning came with two outs. The Nationals went on to lose 9–4, dropping back below .500. Williams made his major league debut in relief, pitching scoreless sixth and seventh innings for the home team.

September 3 was a memorable day for the Nationals. Trailing into the ninth inning, center fielder Bryce Harper led the team to a dramatic comeback with a two-run home run off St. Louis Cardinals closer Bud Norris to tie the game followed by a tenth-inning sacrifice fly off his former College of Southern Nevada teammate Chasen Shreve. The Nationals walked off the visiting St. Louis ballclub 4–3, with reliever Greg Holland, whom the Nationals signed the month prior after the Cardinals released him, picking up the win with two scoreless innings of work. During the game, starter Max Scherzer passed the 250-strikeout mark for the season, moving into second place alone behind Randy Johnson for the most consecutive seasons with at least 250 strikeouts. (Note: Scherzer extended his streak to five seasons, second only to Johnson's six, which he recorded from the 1996 season to the 2002 season. (See Macklin, Oliver, "Max in rare class with 5th straight 250-K year", MLB.com, September 3, 2018)) Meanwhile, the Nationals concluded a ten-season affiliation with the Syracuse Chiefs, who shut out the visiting Buffalo Bisons behind starter Kyle McGowin in the final game of their player development contract with Washington before converting to a Class-AAA affiliate for the New York Mets in 2019. McGowin was called up for the first time on September 4, as the Nationals selected his contract. Right-handed pitchers Erick Fedde and Joe Ross were also activated from the 60-day disabled list. The Nationals summoned minor league pitcher Austin Voth, infielder Adrián Sánchez, and top outfield prospect Víctor Robles from Syracuse as well. Soto walked for the 67th time in the September 4 game to set a new record for walks by a teenager in the modern era; (Note: Soto passed Mel Ott, who racked up 66 walks over parts of the 1926, 1927, and 1928 seasons for the New York Giants, to set the record for walks by a teenager in the major leagues since 1900. (See Dixon, Michael, "Juan Soto makes more history with second-inning walk", Yardbarker, September 4, 2018)) however, in the same game, Williams was tagged for his first earned runs, taking the loss against the Cardinals in an offense-heavy 11–8 contest as he gave up three home runs. Making his major league debut in relief the next day, McGowin also gave up a solo home run that, while McGowin did not factor in the decision, ultimately represented the Cardinals' final margin of victory in the 7–6 contest. The big blows in the September 5 game were supplied by Cardinals first baseman Matt Adams, whom the Nationals had traded to St. Louis less than a month prior. Adams hit two home runs in the game against his former teammate, starter Tanner Roark, who took the loss. The Nationals' homestand continued with a loss to the visiting Chicago Cubs on September 6. The Nationals led into the eighth inning, but Miller gave up the tying run before rookie reliever Jimmy Cordero allowed the go-ahead runs in the tenth inning to take the loss.

Following a September 7 rainout, the Nationals' fortune turned. They swept the Cubs in a double-header that started September 8 and ended in the early morning on September 9, with Scherzer throwing a complete game for the win in the first game and the Nationals rallying late on a go-ahead home run by Harper to eventually win the second, with reliever Sean Doolittle, just activated from the disabled list, appearing for the first time since July and earning a hold. The September 9 game was postponed due to rain, as was the Nationals' September 10 series opener at Philadelphia, as the Philadelphia Phillies grounds crew had neglected to put a tarp over the infield at Citizens Bank Park before the start of a days-long rainstorm that left the infield dirt unplayable. The Phillies rented blowtorches and propane tanks in a futile effort to dry the infield and avoid the postponement, but union representatives from both teams ultimately prompted a single-admission double-header to be scheduled for September 11. The Nationals swept the double-header against the Phillies, too, with rookie catcher Spencer Kieboom hitting a memorable first career home run in the first game hours after losing a "temporary tooth" to help power his team to the win and fellow rookie Soto lashing two home runs in the second game, including the go-ahead home run off Yacksel Ríos in the tenth inning, after the Nationals rallied against Phillies relievers Seranthony Domínguez and Luis García for three runs to tie the game in the ninth inning. Washington completed its sweep of the division-rival Phillies the next day, with Stephen Strasburg providing seven one-run innings and Harper, Soto, and Ryan Zimmerman providing over-the-fence offense in the 5–1 game. The Cubs ended the Nationals' winning streak at five, taking the makeup game at Nationals Park on September 13 in extra innings as star infielder Javier Báez knocked in three of their four runs.

The Nationals rebounded from the impromptu one-game homestand by taking two out of three from the Atlanta Braves. The Braves held Scherzer to four innings and pinned a loss on the Nationals ace in his worst start of the season, in terms of both innings pitched and runs allowed, on September 14. However, the Nationals took the next two games. Soto set a new record for stolen bases in a game by a teenager with three on September 15 (Note: The previous record for the youngest player to steal three bases in a major league game was set by Rickey Henderson for the Oakland Athletics on August 23, 1979 at 20 years and 241 days old. Soto was 19 years and 235 days old when he broke Henderson's record. (See Collier, Jamal, "Juan Soto youngest with 3 steals in 1 game", mlb.com, September 15, 2018)) in a game that also saw the Nationals set a new team record with 14 walks. However, the Nationals lost Jeremy Hellickson in his first appearance since coming off the disabled list days earlier as he re-injured his wrist on a swing. The Nationals took the rubber game on September 16, as Doolittle notched his first save since coming off the disabled list. Their roadtrip continuing, the Nationals dropped the first of two games against the Miami Marlins on September 17 despite an early four-run lead, although Robles hit a 427-foot blast to left field for his first career home run off Miami starter Trevor Richards. Soto's on-base streak ended at 21 games, one shy of tying the major league record for a teenager. (Note: Byrum, Tyler (September 17, 2018). "Victor Robles' first home run give Nationals fans something to be happy about in September". NBC Sports Washington. Archived from the original on September 19, 2018. The 22-game on-base record was set by Mel Ott of the New York Giants in 1928.) The Nationals finished with a series split with a win on September 18.

In a difficult twelfth-inning loss to start a four-game series with the Mets, the Nationals were beaten on a sacrifice fly by their former catcher José Lobatón on September 20. Nationals third baseman Anthony Rendon hit his 100th career home run in the 5–4 loss. Harper was ejected for the first time in the season by home plate umpire D. J. Reyburn for arguing balls and strikes in the bottom of the twelfth. After losing on September 21 to the Mets behind their ace, Jacob deGrom, the Nationals were officially eliminated from contention in the National League East Division as the Braves won later that night. Despite winning on September 22, the Nationals were eliminated from playoff contention altogether as the St. Louis Cardinals in the wildcard hunt won that day. Voth was tasked with the start on September 22, as Roark was home for the birth of his third child; he earned his first career win as he led a one-hit shutout of the Mets, pitching five strong innings. In the final game of the Mets series, a loss on September 23, Turner stole a base to set a new team record for career steals. (Note: The record was previously held by Ian Desmond, who stole 122 bases between the 2009 and 2015 seasons for the Nationals. (See "Conforto's bases-loaded triple helps Mets beat Nationals 8-6", The Washington Post, September 23, 2018)) Rookie reliever Wander Suero took the loss, the first in his major league career, after surrendering a go-ahead RBI triple to New York slugger Michael Conforto.

In their first full series since elimination, and their final series of the year at home, the Nationals swept the division-rival Marlins over three games from September 24 to September 26. In the first game of the series, Harper hit a sacrifice fly to put him at 100 RBIs for the season, the first time in a professional campaign he had reached the century mark, and earned a standing ovation from his home supporters. The September 25 game marked Scherzer's final start of the season, and a momentous one, as he struck out ten Marlins to reach the 300-strikeout mark for the first time in his career. (Note: Scherzer became the 17th pitcher since 1900 to strike out at least 300 batters in a season, and the first in the National League since Clayton Kershaw for the Los Angeles Dodgers in 2015. (See Fendrich, Howard, "Max Scherzer reaches 300 season strikeout mark in Nationals win over Marlins", nbcsports.com, September 25, 2018, and Simon, Andrew, "Cole, Scherzer could shatter Pedro's K-rate mark", mlb.com, May 18, 2018)) Scherzer also earned his 18th win of the season in the contest. With Roark still at home in Georgia with his family, the Nationals tasked McGowin with his first career start to finish out the series. He pitched into the fifth inning, allowing just one hit and zero runs after retiring the first eleven batters he faced, before exiting with a blister on his pitching hand. The Washington bullpen finished off the 9–3 win to complete the sweep. The game was called in the seventh inning due to rain, with Harper left on deck instead of getting one last at-bat at home in the season before his anticipated free agency.

The Nationals finished off the season by flying to Denver and taking on the Colorado Rockies for a three-game series. The Rockies clinched a playoff berth as they beat Ross and the Nationals on September 28, in the series opener. The visitors rebounded in Strasburg's final start of the year the next day, winning 12–2. Soto deposited the 22nd home run of his rookie season into the right field seats to move into a tie for second place for homers by a teenager in major league history. (Note: Only Tony Conigliaro, who hit 24 home runs for the 1964 Boston Red Sox as a 19-year-old rookie, leads Soto and Bryce Harper, who also homered 22 times as a teenager during the 2012 season for the Nationals, in major league career home runs by a teenager. (See Graham, Pat, "Rockies fall to Nats, drop into NL West tie with Dodgers", San Francisco Chronicle, September 29, 2018)) However, the Nationals had scored their final runs of the season in the blowout victory, as Tyler Anderson pitched masterfully to lead the Rockies in a 12–0 shutout at the expense of Washington rookies Fedde, Voth, and McGowin, as well as the veteran Collins, all of whom gave up home runs en route to the loss as the motivated Colorado team earned a divisional tiebreaker with the Los Angeles Dodgers. The loss was the Nationals' most lopsided of the season.

Washington ended the season with an 82–80 record of wins and losses, their lowest win total since the 2011 season but good for second place in the National League East Division, eight games back of the playoffs-bound Braves and two in front of the Phillies. In total, they went 15–12 in September, their first winning month since May and only their second full month with a winning record all season.

=== Notable transactions ===
- April 5, 2018: The Nationals extended the contract of general manager Mike Rizzo for two years, through the end of the 2020 season.
- April 7, 2018: The Nationals designated left-handed pitcher Enny Romero for assignment.
- April 11, 2018: The Nationals designated catcher Miguel Montero for assignment and selected the contract of minor league outfielder Moisés Sierra.
- April 12, 2018: The Nationals signed infielder Mark Reynolds to a minor league contract.
- April 13, 2018: The Nationals released catcher Miguel Montero and signed catcher Tuffy Gosewisch to a minor league contract.
- April 14, 2018: The Nationals lost left-handed pitcher Enny Romero to the Pittsburgh Pirates on a waiver claim.
- April 20, 2018: The Nationals designated right-handed pitcher A. J. Cole for assignment and selected the contract of minor league pitcher Carlos Torres.
- April 23, 2018: The Nationals sold right-handed pitcher A. J. Cole to the New York Yankees for cash considerations.
- April 27, 2018: The Nationals signed infielder Matt Hague to a minor league contract.
- May 11, 2018: The Nationals selected the contract of minor league catcher Spencer Kieboom.
- May 12, 2018: The Nationals selected the contract of minor league first baseman Mark Reynolds.
- May 20, 2018: The Nationals designated outfielder Moisés Sierra for assignment and selected the contract of minor league outfielder Juan Soto; Sierra was outrighted to Class-AAA Syracuse.
- May 21, 2018: The Nationals selected the contract of minor league left-handed relief pitcher Tim Collins.
- May 22, 2018: The Nationals signed outfielder Jaff Decker to a minor league contract.
- May 23, 2018: The Nationals designated right-handed relief pitcher Carlos Torres for assignment and signed left-handed pitcher Josh Edgin and outfielder Adam Brent Walker to minor league contracts; Torres was outrighted to Class-AAA Syracuse.
- June 9, 2018: The Nationals released outfielder Rafael Bautista.
- June 13, 2018: The Nationals signed outfielder Rafael Bautista to a new minor league contract.
- June 18, 2018: The Nationals acquired right-handed relief pitcher Kelvin Herrera from the Kansas City Royals for infielder Kelvin Gutiérrez, minor league outfielder Blake Perkins, and minor league pitcher Yohanse Morel.
- July 4, 2018: The Nationals designated left-handed relief pitcher Tim Collins for assignment; Collins was outrighted to Class-AAA Syracuse.
- July 22, 2018: The Nationals acquired minor league pitcher Jacob Condra-Bogan from the Kansas City Royals for outfielder Brian Goodwin.
- July 26, 2018: The Nationals designated first baseman José Marmolejos for assignment and selected the contract of minor league pitcher Tommy Milone; Marmolejos was outrighted to Class-AAA Syracuse.
- July 31, 2018: The Nationals acquired minor league pitcher Jhon Romero from the Chicago Cubs for right-handed relief pitcher Brandon Kintzler.
- August 1, 2018: The Nationals designated right-handed relief pitcher Shawn Kelley for assignment and selected the contract of minor league pitcher Jimmy Cordero.
- August 5, 2018: The Nationals sold right-handed relief pitcher Shawn Kelley and cash considerations to the Oakland Athletics for international slot money.
- August 14, 2018: The Nationals selected the contract of minor league pitcher Tim Collins.
- August 21, 2018: The Nationals acquired minor league infielder Andruw Monasterio and a player to be named later from the Chicago Cubs for infielder Daniel Murphy and sold first baseman Matt Adams to the St. Louis Cardinals for cash considerations.
- August 31, 2018: The Nationals acquired minor league pitcher Andrew Istler from the Los Angeles Dodgers for right-handed relief pitcher Ryan Madson and acquired minor league catcher and infielder KJ Harrison and minor league infielder Gilbert Lara from the Milwaukee Brewers for left-handed starting pitcher Gio González and international slot money.
- September 1, 2018: The Nationals selected the contract of minor league pitcher Austen Williams.
- September 4, 2018: The Nationals selected the contract of minor league pitcher Kyle McGowin.
- September 18, 2018: The Nationals signed a two-year player development contract with the Class-AAA Fresno Grizzlies.

=== Major league debuts ===
- May 1, 2018: Wander Suero
- May 20, 2018: Juan Soto
- June 3, 2018: Jefry Rodríguez
- July 14, 2018: Austin Voth
- August 2, 2018: Jimmy Cordero
- September 2, 2018: Austen Williams
- September 5, 2018: Kyle McGowin

=== Broadcasters ===
In 2018, the Mid-Atlantic Sports Network (MASN) hired Michael Morse, an outfielder and first baseman who had played for the Nationals from 2009 to 2012 season, as a broadcaster. From May 25 to 27, he made his broadcasting debut by filling in for Ray Knight as the studio analyst on the Nats Xtra pregame and postgame shows on MASN, working with host Johnny Holliday during a weekend three-game Washington Nationals series at the Miami Marlins. In his second stint with MASN, from June 15 to 17, 2018, he made his debut as an in-game color commentator when he substituted for F. P. Santangelo for the MASN broadcast of a three-game weekend Nationals series against the Toronto Blue Jays in Toronto, working alongside play-by-play man Bob Carpenter. He substituted again for Santangelo from August 13 to 15, 2018, during the three-game Nationals series against the St. Louis Cardinals in St. Louis.

Nationals radio play-by-play announcer Dave Jageler, who had called every Nationals regular-season game since he joined the Nationals' broadcasting team on Opening Day in 2006, finally missed a game on May 31, 2018, when he took leave to attend his son's high school graduation. His Nationals broadcasting streak ended at 2,016 straight games. Longtime Harrisburg Senators broadcaster Terry Byrom took his place for a four-game series the Nationals played against the Atlanta Braves at Suntrust Park in Atlanta from May 31 through June 3. Jageler returned to the booth on June 5 as the Nationals hosted the Tampa Bay Rays at Nationals Park.

In mid-September 2018, MASN pulled Ray Knight, who had served as the studio analyst on Nats Xtra since the show's beginning in 2007 season, from broadcasts after he had a verbal altercation with a staff member at MASN. He did not return to the air, and after the season concluded, MASN cut ties with him, announcing that it had not picked up his 2019 contract option. The 2018 season also was Johnny Holliday's last with MASN; the host of Nats Xtra from 2007 to 2018, he announced that he would not return to MASN in 2019 so that he could spend more time with his family.

=== Culture and entertainment ===
==== Bullpen cart ====
The bullpen cart, absent from Major League Baseball since 1995, enjoyed a revival in Major League Baseball in 2018, with the Arizona Diamondbacks introducing one on March 29 and the Detroit Tigers placing one in service on April 13. During the season, the Nationals began to look into a bullpen cart of their own and secured a sponsorship for one in July; a Florida company completed it four weeks later. Nationals owner Mark Lerner assisted in designing the cart – a golf cart with a body that looks like a large baseball, a roof that looks like a large blue Nationals hat, a red Nationals "curly W" logo on every hubcap, front roof supports that look like baseball bats, baseball gloves behind each headlight to make the headlights look like baseballs when they are turned on, and a red light on the roof that flashes whenever the cart is in motion. The cart made its debut at Nationals Park on August 17. It drives all the way around the field along the warning track each time a relief pitcher enters the game for either team – clockwise, passing the Nationals' bullpen in right field first, whenever a Nationals reliever enters the game and counterclockwise, passing the visitors' bullpen first, whenever a visiting team's reliever enters – whether the reliever opts to use it or not.

Late on the evening of September 8, in the top of the eighth inning during the second game of a doubleheader against the Chicago Cubs, Nationals reliever Sean Doolittle, a proponent of bullpen cart use, became the first player to use the Nationals Park bullpen cart. Doolittle had made history as the first visiting player to use the Diamondbacks' bullpen cart during a game at Arizona on May 10, and Nationals players had decided that they would not use the Nationals Park cart until Doolittle returned from a lengthy stint on the disabled list and had the chance to become the first player to use it. The first visiting player to use it was New York Mets reliever Robert Gsellman in the eighth inning of a game on the evening of September 20.

=== Attendance ===
The Nationals drew 2,529,604 fans at Nationals Park during 2018, their fourth-highest attendance since arriving in Washington in 2005. It placed them eighth in attendance for the season among the 15 National League teams, down from seventh in 2017 despite being an increase over their 2017 attendance total. Their highest attendance at a home game occurred on April 5, when they drew an Opening Day crowd of 42,477 for a game against the New York Mets, while the low mark was 19,357 for a game against the Atlanta Braves on April 10. Their average home attendance was 31,230 per game, fourth-highest since their arrival in Washington.

== Game log ==
Legend
	Nationals win
	Nationals loss
	Postponement
**Bold**	Nationals team member

2018 game log: 82–80 (Home: 41–40; Away: 41–40)
March: 2–0 (Home: 0–0; Away: 2–0)

#	Date	Opponent	Score	Win	Loss	Save	Attendance	Record
–	March 29	@ Reds	Postponed (rain); Rescheduled for March 30.					
1	March 30	@ Reds	2–0	**Scherzer** (1–0)	Bailey (0–1)	**Doolittle** (1)	43,878	1–0
2	March 31	@ Reds	13–7	**Strasburg** (1–0)	Castillo (0–1)	—	27,341	2–0

April: 11–16 (Home: 5–9; Away: 6–7)

#	Date	Opponent	Score	Win	Loss	Save	Attendance	Record
3	April 1	@ Reds	6–5	**González** (1–0)	Romano (0–1)	**Doolittle** (2)	10,335	3–0
4	April 2	@ Braves	8–1	**Roark** (1–0)	Newcomb (0–1)	—	25,054	4–0
5	April 3	@ Braves	6–13	Carle (1–1)	**Cole** (0–1)	—	26,782	4–1
6	April 4	@ Braves	1–7	Foltynewicz (1–0)	**Scherzer** (1–1)	—	29,834	4–2
7	April 5	Mets	2–8	deGrom (2–0)	**Strasburg** (1–1)	—	42,477	4–3
8	April 7	Mets	2–3	Robles (1–0)	**Kintzler** (0–1)	Familia (4)	28,952	4–4
9	April 8	Mets	5–6 (12)	Lugo (1–0)	**Kintzler** (0–2)	Rhame (1)	21,579	4–5
10	April 9	Braves	2–0	**Scherzer** (2–1)	Teherán (0–1)	—	19,528	5–5
11	April 10	Braves	4–1	**Strasburg** (2–1)	Foltynewicz (1–1)	**Madson** (1)	19,357	6–5
12	April 11	Braves	3–5 (12)	Carle (2–1)	**Madson** (0–1)	—	21,109	6–6
13	April 12	Rockies	1–5	Bettis (2–0)	**González** (1–1)	—	24,213	6–7
14	April 13	Rockies	1–2	Oberg (1–0)	**Roark** (1–1)	Davis (6)	32,702	6–8
15	April 14	Rockies	6–2	**Scherzer** (3–1)	Gray (1–3)	—	31,700	7–8
16	April 15	Rockies	5–6	Ottavino (3–0)	**Doolittle** (0–1)	Davis (7)	25,462	7–9
17	April 16	@ Mets	8–6	**Cole** (1–1)	Ramos (0–1)	**Madson** (2)	22,829	8–9
18	April 17	@ Mets	5–2	**González** (2–1)	Wheeler (1–1)	**Doolittle** (3)	22,724	9–9
19	April 18	@ Mets	5–11	Ramos (1–1)	**Madson** (0–2)	—	23,117	9–10
20	April 20	@ Dodgers	5–2	**Scherzer** (4–1)	Kershaw (1–3)	**Doolittle** (4)	50,211	10–10
21	April 21	@ Dodgers	0–4	Ryu (3–0)	**Strasburg** (2–2)	—	50,908	10–11
22	April 22	@ Dodgers	3–4	Fields (2–0)	**Gott** (0–1)	Jansen (3)	51,297	10–12
23	April 23	@ Giants	2–4	Stratton (2–1)	**González** (2–2)	Strickland (4)	36,983	10–13
24	April 24	@ Giants	3–4	Moronta (1–0)	**Roark** (1–2)	Strickland (5)	37,147	10–14
25	April 25	@ Giants	15–2	**Scherzer** (5–1)	Samardzija (1–1)	—	35,126	11–14
26	April 27	Diamondbacks	4–5	Godley (4–1)	**Strasburg** (2–3)	Boxberger (7)	26,517	11–15
27	April 28	Diamondbacks	3–4 (10)	Hirano (2–0)	**Solis** (0–1)	Boxberger (8)	32,963	11–16
28	April 29	Diamondbacks	3–1	**González** (3–2)	McFarland (1–1)	**Doolittle** (5)	30,285	12–16
29	April 30	Pirates	3–2	**Roark** (2–2)	Taillon (2–3)	**Kintzler** (1)	20,879	13–16

May: 19–7 (Home: 7–5; Away:12–2)

#	Date	Opponent	Score	Win	Loss	Save	Attendance	Record
30	May 1	Pirates	12–4	**Scherzer** (6–1)	Kuhl (3–2)	—	23,534	14–16
31	May 2	Pirates	9–3	**Strasburg** (3–3)	Nova (2–2)	—	27,086	15–16
32	May 3	Pirates	3–1	**Solis** (1–1)	Williams (4–2)	**Doolittle** (6)	30,434	16–16
33	May 4	Phillies	7–3	**González** (4–2)	Pivetta (1–2)	—	35,497	17–16
34	May 5	Phillies	1–3	Velasquez (2–4)	**Roark** (2–3)	Neris (6)	34,687	17–17
35	May 6	Phillies	5–4	**Doolittle** (1–1)	Neris (1–2)	—	30,611	18–17
36	May 7	@ Padres	8–5	**Strasburg** (4–3)	Ross (2–3)	—	17,296	19–17
37	May 8	@ Padres	4–0	**Hellickson** (1–0)	Richard (1–5)	—	18,989	20–17
38	May 9	@ Padres	1–2	Stammen (1–0)	**Gott** (0–2)	Hand (10)	18,804	20–18
39	May 10	@ Diamondbacks	2–1 (11)	**Kintzler** (1–2)	Salas (3–4)	**Doolittle** (7)	17,397	21–18
40	May 11	@ Diamondbacks	3–1	**Scherzer** (7–1)	Koch (2–1)	**Doolittle** (8)	22,901	22–18
41	May 12	@ Diamondbacks	2–1	**Strasburg** (5–3)	Scribner (0–1)	**Madson** (3)	29,428	23–18
42	May 13	@ Diamondbacks	6–4	**Madson** (1–2)	Bradley (0–1)	**Doolittle** (9)	31,906	24–18
–	May 15	Yankees	Suspended (rain); Continuation scheduled for May 16. (Note: The game was suspended due to rain after 5 1/2 innings with the score tied 3–3. It was scheduled to resume on May 16 prior to the regularly scheduled May 16 game (see Janes, Chelsea, "Nats-Yankees are suspended, and Bryce Harper won't play any games with N.Y. media," washingtonpost.com, May 15, 2018), but on May 16 the continuation was postponed until June 18 due to rain (see Janes, Chelsea, "Nationals-Yankees postponed to June 18, and Washington gets to rest up," washingtonpost.com, May 16, 2018, 4;49 p.m. EDT.))					
–	May 16 (1)	Yankees	Continuation of May 15 game postponed (rain); Rescheduled for June 18. (Note: The game had been suspended on May 15 due to rain after 5 1/2 innings with the score tied 3–3. It was scheduled to resume on May 16 prior to the regularly scheduled May 16 game (see Janes, Chelsea, "Nats-Yankees are suspended, and Bryce Harper won't play any games with N.Y. media," washingtonpost.com, May 15, 2018), but on May 16 the continuation was postponed until June 18 due to rain (see Janes, Chelsea, "Nationals-Yankees postponed to June 18, and Washington gets to rest up," washingtonpost.com, May 16, 2018, 4;49 p.m. EDT.))					
–	May 16 (2)	Yankees	Regularly scheduled game postponed (rain); Rescheduled for June 18.					
–	May 18	Dodgers	Postponed (rain); Rescheduled for May 19 as part of a doubleheader.					
43	May 19 (1)	Dodgers	1–4	Stripling (1–1)	**Roark** (2–4)	Jansen (7)	26,740	24–19
44	May 19 (2)	Dodgers	4–5	Goeddel (3–0)	**Doolittle** (1–2)	Jansen (8)	32,378	24–20
45	May 20	Dodgers	2–7	Wood (1–4)	**Strasburg** (5–4)	Fields (2)	40,201	24–21
46	May 21	Padres	10–2	**González** (5–2)	Erlin (1–3)	—	27,890	25–21
47	May 22	Padres	2–1	**Doolittle** (2–2)	Strahm (0–2)	—	25,700	26–21
48	May 23	Padres	1–3	Ross (4–3)	**Fedde** (0–1)	Hand (15)	31,076	26–22
49	May 25	@ Marlins	9–5	**Scherzer** (8–1)	Wittgren (2–1)	**Doolittle** (10)	7,512	27–22
50	May 26	@ Marlins	4–1	**Miller** (1–0)	Ziegler (0–4)	**Doolittle** (11)	11,646	28–22
51	May 27	@ Marlins	5–2	**Strasburg** (6–4)	Hernández (0–2)	**Kintzler** (2)	11,651	29–22
52	May 28	@ Orioles	6–0	**González** (6–2)	Cobb (1–7)	—	36,139	30–22
53	May 29	@ Orioles	3–2	**Hellickson** (2–0)	Bundy (3–7)	**Doolittle** (12)	13,935	31–22
54	May 30	@ Orioles	2–0	**Scherzer** (9–1)	Hess (2–2)	**Doolittle** (13)	20,370	32–22
55	May 31	@ Braves	2–4	Newcomb (6–1)	**Roark** (2–5)	Vizcaíno (10)	22,380	32–23

June: 10–16 (Home: 7–6; Away: 3–10)

#	Date	Opponent	Score	Win	Loss	Save	Attendance	Record
56	June 1	@ Braves	0–4	Foltynewicz (5–3)	**Strasburg** (6–5)	—	33,845	32–24
57	June 2	@ Braves	5–3 (14)	**Miller** (2–0)	Socolovich (0–1)	**Doolittle** (14)	39,578	33–24
58	June 3	@ Braves	2–4	Vizcaíno (2–2)	**Roark** (2–6)	—	33,132	33–25
59	June 5	Rays	4–2	**Scherzer** (10–1)	Eovaldi (1–1)	**Doolittle** (15)	32,165	34–25
60	June 6	Rays	11–2	**Roark** (3–6)	Venters (1–1)	—	33,106	35–25
61	June 8	Giants	5–9	Moronta (2–0)	**Strasburg** (6–6)	—	41,591	35–26
62	June 9	Giants	7–5	**Miller** (3–0)	Rodríguez (1–1)	**Doolittle** (16)	37,701	36–26
63	June 10	Giants	0–2	Holland (4–6)	**Scherzer** (10–2)	Strickland (13)	35,705	36–27
64	June 12	@ Yankees	0–3	Sabathia (4–1)	**Roark** (3–7)	Chapman (18)	44,220	36–28
65	June 13	@ Yankees	5–4	**Miller** (4–0)	Shreve (2–1)	**Doolittle** (17)	45,030	37–28
66	June 15	@ Blue Jays	5–6	Oh (2–2)	**González** (6–3)	Tepera (4)	29,633	37–29
67	June 16	@ Blue Jays	0–2	Estrada (4–6)	**Scherzer** (10–3)	Clippard (3)	36,044	37–30
68	June 17	@ Blue Jays	6–8	Tepera (4–2)	**Madson** (1–3)	—	35,146	37–31
69	June 18 (1) (Note: The game had been suspended on May 15 due to rain after 5 1/2 innings with the score tied 3–3. It was scheduled to resume on May 16 prior to the regularly scheduled May 16 game (see Janes, Chelsea, "Nats-Yankees are suspended, and Bryce Harper won't play any games with N.Y. media," washingtonpost.com, May 15, 2018), but on May 16 both the continuation of the May 15 game and the regularly scheduled game for May 16 were postponed until June 18 due to rain (see Janes, Chelsea, "Nationals-Yankees postponed to June 18, and Washington gets to rest up," washingtonpost.com, May 16, 2018, 4;49 p.m. EDT.))	Yankees	5–3	**Suero** (1–0)	Green (4–1) (Note: Because the game began on May 15, Chad Green's record officially stood at 2–0 rather than 4–0 when he entered the game, and this loss officially made his record 2–1 as of May 15, with his won-loss record for ensuing games retrospectively updated accordingly.)	**Doolittle** (18) (Note: Because the game began on May 15, Sean Doolittle officially had nine saves rather than 17 when he entered the game, and this save officially gave him 10 saves as of May 15, with his save total for ensuing games retrospectively updated accordingly.)	41,567 (Note: This attendance figure represents the gate on May 15. On June 18, the continuation of the May 15 suspended game was treated as the first game of a traditional doubleheader, and the attendance for the combined doubleheader is given as the gate for the second game on June 18.)	38–31
70	June 18 (2)	Yankees	2–4	Gray (5–4)	**Fedde** (0–2)	Chapman (21)	42,723	38–32
71	June 19	Orioles	9–7	**Miller** (5–0)	Scott (0–1)	**Doolittle** (19)	33,391	39–32
72	June 20	Orioles	0–3	Castro (2–2)	**González** (6–4)	—	32,153	39–33
73	June 21	Orioles	4–2	**Herrera** (2–1)	Givens (0–4)	**Doolittle** (20)	36,868	40–33
74	June 22	Phillies	2–12	Eflin (5–2)	**Roark** (3–8)	—	35,630	40–34
75	June 23	Phillies	3–5	Nola (9–2)	**Fedde** (0–3)	Domínguez (4)	40,341	40–35
76	June 24	Phillies	8–6	**Madson** (2–3)	Domínguez (1–2)	**Doolittle** (21)	29,314	41–35
77	June 25	@ Rays	0–11	Snell (10–4)	**González** (6–5)	—	13,624	41–36
78	June 26	@ Rays	0–1	Eovaldi (2–3)	**Scherzer** (10–4)	Romo (6)	14,289	41–37
79	June 28	@ Phillies	3–4	Nola (10–2)	**Roark** (3–9)	Domínguez (6)	25,026	41–38
80	June 29	@ Phillies	17–7	**Fedde** (1–3)	Pivetta (4–7)	—	36,903	42–38
81	June 30	@ Phillies	2–3	Arano (1–0)	**Hellickson** (2–1)	Domínguez (7)	42,746	42–39

July: 11–14 (Home: 5–5; Away: 6–9)

#	Date	Opponent	Score	Win	Loss	Save	Attendance	Record
82	July 1	@ Phillies	3–4 (13)	Pivetta (5–7)	**Miller** (5–1)	—	22,051	42–40
83	July 2	Red Sox	3–4	Porcello (10–3)	**Scherzer** (10–5)	Kimbrel (25)	39,002	42–41
84	July 3	Red Sox	4–11	Workman (1–0)	**Roark** (3–10)	—	42,531	42–42
85	July 4	Red Sox	0–3	Rodríguez (10–3)	**Madson** (2–4)	Kimbrel (26)	42,528	42–43
86	July 5	Marlins	14–12	**Kelley** (1–0)	Conley (2–1)	**Doolittle** (22)	24,314	43–43
87	July 6	Marlins	3–2	**Doolittle** (3–2)	Barraclough (0–3)	—	32,652	44–43
88	July 7	Marlins	18–4	**Scherzer** (11–5)	Chen (2–6)	—	34,364	45–43
89	July 8	Marlins	2–10	Conley (3–1)	**Roark** (3–11)	—	30,464	45–44
90	July 9	@ Pirates	3–6	Nova (5–6)	**Rodríguez** (0–1)	Vázquez (19)	14,073	45–45
91	July 10	@ Pirates	5–1	**Hellickson** (3–1)	Musgrove (3–4)	—	17,103	46–45
92	July 11	@ Pirates	0–2	Williams (7–7)	**González** (6–6)	Vázquez (20)	21,083	46–46
93	July 12	@ Mets	5–4	**Scherzer** (12–5)	Matz (4–7)	**Madson** (4)	28,120	47–46
94	July 13	@ Mets	2–4	Syndergaard (5–1)	**Roark** (3–12)	Gsellman (4)	26,558	47–47
95	July 14	@ Mets	4–7	Wheeler (3–6)	**Voth** (0–1)	Familia (17)	30,438	47–48
96	July 15	@ Mets	6–1	**Hellickson** (4–1)	Swarzak (0–2)	—	26,572	48–48
**All–Star Break (July 16–19)**
97	July 20	Braves	5–8	Sánchez (5–2)	**Strasburg** (6–7)	Minter (5)	41,008	48–49
–	July 21	Braves	Postponed (rain); Rescheduled for August 7 as part of a doubleheader.					
98	July 22	Braves	6–2	**Scherzer** (13–5)	Foltynewicz (7–6)	**Herrera** (15)	39,063	49–49
99	July 23	@ Brewers	1–6	Chacín (9–3)	**González** (6–7)	—	26,073	49–50
100	July 24	@ Brewers	4–5 (10)	Jennings (4–3)	**Grace** (0–1)	—	33,990	49–51
101	July 25	@ Brewers	7–3	**Roark** (4–12)	Peralta (4–2)	—	37,586	50–51
102	July 26	@ Marlins	10–3	**Miller** (6–1)	Conley (3–2)	—	8,506	51–51
103	July 27	@ Marlins	9–1	**Scherzer** (14–5)	López (2–2)	—	9,297	52–51
104	July 28	@ Marlins	1–2 (10)	Graves (1–1)	**Herrera** (2–2)	—	11,779	52–52
105	July 29	@ Marlins	0–5	Ureña (3–10)	**Hellickson** (4–2)	—	12,112	52–53
106	July 31	Mets	25–4	**Roark** (5–12)	Matz (4–5)	—	35,029	53–53

August: 14–15 (Home: 9–7; Away: 5–8)

#	Date	Opponent	Score	Win	Loss	Save	Attendance	Record
107	August 1	Mets	5–3	**Milone** (1–0)	Syndergaard (6–2)	**Herrera** (16)	34,319	54–53
108	August 2	Reds	10–4	**Scherzer** (15–5)	Mahle (7–9)	—	28,845	55–53
–	August 3	Reds	Postponed (rain): Rescheduled for August 4 as part of a doubleheader.					
109	August 4 (1)	Reds	1–7	DeSclafani (5–3)	**González** (6–8)	—	32,687	55–54
110	August 4 (2)	Reds	6–2	**Hellickson** (5–2)	Harvey (5–7)	—	36,149	56–54
111	August 5	Reds	2–1	**Roark** (6–12)	Castillo (6–9)	**Herrera** (17)	33,486	57–54
112	August 7 (1)	Braves	8–3	**Rodríguez** (1–0)	Allard (1–1)	—	26,965	58–54
113	August 7 (2)	Braves	1–3	Biddle (3–0)	**Herrera** (2–3)	Minter (9)	28,970	58–55
114	August 8	Braves	3–8	Foltynewicz (9–7)	**Milone** (1–1)	—	30,203	58–56
115	August 9	Braves	6–3	**González** (7–8)	Parsons (0–1)	—	28,347	59–56
116	August 10	@ Cubs	2–3	Cishek (3–1)	**Solís** (1–2)	Strop (9)	41,531	59–57
117	August 11	@ Cubs	9–4	**Roark** (7–12)	Lester (12–5)	—	41,320	60–57
118	August 12	@ Cubs	3–4	Wilson (4–3)	**Madson** (2–5)	—	36,490	60–58
119	August 13	@ Cardinals	6–7	Hudson (3–0)	**Glover** (0–1)	—	37,197	60–59
120	August 14	@ Cardinals	4–6	Gant (5–4)	**González** (7–9)	Hicks (4)	38,214	60–60
121	August 15	@ Cardinals	2–4	Gomber (3–0)	**Hellickson** (5–3)	Norris (23)	36,696	60–61
122	August 16	@ Cardinals	5–4	**Roark** (8–12)	Weaver (6–11)	**Glover** (1)	38,074	61–61
123	August 17	Marlins	8–2	**Scherzer** (16–5)	Straily (4–6)	—	37,106	62–61
124	August 18	Marlins	5–7 (10)	Steckenrider (4–2)	**Glover** (0–2)	Graves (1)	30,900	62–62
125	August 19	Marlins	1–12	Ureña (4–12)	**González** (7–10)	—	31,435	62–63
126	August 21	Phillies	10–4	**Cordero** (1–0)	Arano (1–2)	—	24,080	63–63
127	August 22	Phillies	8–7	**Grace** (1–1)	Domínguez (1–4)	—	31,855	64–63
128	August 23	Phillies	0–2	Nola (15–3)	**Scherzer** (16–6)	Neshek (4)	29,475	64–64
129	August 24	@ Mets	0–3	Vargas (4–8)	**González** (7–11)	Gsellman (8)	23,763	64–65
130	August 25	@ Mets	0–3	Wheeler (9–6)	**Roark** (8–13)	—	29,868	64–66
131	August 26	@ Mets	15–0	**Rodríguez** (2–1)	Matz (5–11)	—	23,192	65–66
132	August 27	@ Phillies	5–3	**Strasburg** (7–7)	Eflin (9–5)	**Miller** (1)	21,261	66–66
133	August 28	@ Phillies	5–4	**Glover** (1–2)	Neshek (1–1)	**Holland** (1)	21,083	67–66
134	August 29	@ Phillies	6–8	Domínguez (2–5)	**Cordero** (1–1)	Hunter (3)	22,525	67–67
135	August 31	Brewers	1–4	Chacín (14–5)	**Roark** (8–14)	Jeffress (8)	30,676	67–68

September: 15–12 (Home: 8–8; Away: 7–4)

#	Date	Opponent	Score	Win	Loss	Save	Attendance	Record
136	September 1	Brewers	5–4	**Holland** (1–2)	Soria (1–4)	**Miller** (2)	30,875	68–68
137	September 2	Brewers	4–9	Woodruff (3–0)	**Rodríguez** (2–2)	—	33,032	68–69
138	September 3	Cardinals	4–3 (10)	**Holland** (2–2)	Shreve (3–3)	—	28,648	69–69
139	September 4	Cardinals	8–11	Ross (8–9)	**Williams** (0–1)	Hicks (6)	21,637	69–70
140	September 5	Cardinals	6–7	Mikolas (14–4)	**Roark** (8–15)	Martínez (1)	22,124	69–71
141	September 6	Cubs	4–6 (10)	Strop (5–1)	**Cordero** (1–2)	Chavez (4)	32,070	69–72
–	September 7	Cubs	Postponed (rain); Rescheduled for September 8 as part of a doubleheader. (Note: The game began after a 1-hour 21-minute delay due to rain. The teams played for 23 minutes before the game was stopped again due to rain with two outs in the top of the second inning and the score tied 0–0. Another 2-hour 54-minute delay ensued before the game was postponed. After recovering from ulnar collateral ligament reconstruction ("Tommy John") surgery, Joe Ross made his first start for the Nationals since July 9, 2017, and gave up one single and hit one batter in 1 2/3 innings of work.(see Zuckerman, Mark, "Game postponed after two delays, true doubleheader Saturday," masnsports.com, September 7, 2018, 11:55 PM EDT Retrieved September 8, 2018.))					
142	September 8 (1)	Cubs	10–3	**Scherzer** (17–6)	García (3–7)	—	41,346 (Note: The September 8 games were played as a single-admission doubleheader.)	70–72
143	September 8 (2)	Cubs	6–5	**Suero** (2–0)	Wilson (4–4)	**Holland** (2)	41,346	71–72
–	September 9	Cubs	Postponed (rain); Rescheduled for September 13.					
–	September 10	@ Phillies	Postponed (wet grounds); Rescheduled for September 11 as part of a doubleheader					
144	September 11 (1)	@ Phillies	3–1	**Fedde** (2–3)	Pivetta (7–12)	**Doolittle** (23)	19,630 (Note: The September 11 games were played as a single-admission doubleheader.)	72–72
145	September 11 (2)	@ Phillies	7–6 (10)	**Suero** (3–0)	Ríos (3–2)	**Holland** (3)	19,630	73–72
146	September 12	@ Phillies	5–1	**Strasburg** (8–7)	Nola (16–5)	—	20,258	74–72
147	September 13	Cubs	3–4 (10)	Strop (6–1)	**Doolittle** (3–3)	Rosario (1)	30,173	74–73
148	September 14	@ Braves	5–10	Gausman (10–10)	**Scherzer** (17–7)	—	39,268	74–74
149	September 15	@ Braves	7–1	**Rodríguez** (3–2)	Teherán (9–8)	—	36,050	75–74
150	September 16	@ Braves	6–4	**Roark** (9–15)	Newcomb (12–9)	**Doolittle** (24)	33,403	76–74
151	September 17	@ Marlins	5–8	García (3–2)	**Glover** (1–3)	Conley (3)	8,440	76–75
152	September 18	@ Marlins	4–2	**Strasburg** (9–7)	Alcántara (2–1)	**Doolittle** (25)	7,726	77–75
153	September 20	Mets	4–5 (12)	Rhame (1–2)	**Rodriguez** (3–3)	Sewald (2)	28,358	77–76
154	September 21	Mets	2–4	deGrom (9–9)	**Ross** (0–1)	Gsellman (12)	37,895	77–77
155	September 22	Mets	6–0	**Voth** (1–1)	Oswalt (3–3)	—	39,372	78–77
156	September 23	Mets	6–8	Gagnon (2–1)	**Suero** (3–1)	Swarzak (4)	34,218	78–78
157	September 24	Marlins	7–3	**Miller** (7–1)	Alcántara (2–2)	—	22,428	79–78
158	September 25	Marlins	9–4	**Scherzer** (18–7)	Brigham (0–4)	—	26,483	80–78
159	September 26	Marlins	9–3 (7)	**Suero** (4–1)	Chen (6–12)	—	28,680	81–78
160	September 28	@ Rockies	2–5	Freeland (17–7)	**Ross** (0–2)	Davis (43)	48,089	81–79
161	September 29	@ Rockies	12–2	**Strasburg** (10–7)	Gray (12–9)	—	47,781	82–79
162	September 30	@ Rockies	0–12	Anderson (7–9)	**Fedde** (2–4)	—	47,833	82–80

== Roster ==
2018 Washington Nationals
Roster
Pitchers: 70 Austin L. Adams; 22 A. J. Cole; 55 Tim Collins; 52 Jimmy Cordero; 62 Sean Doolittle; 23 Erick Fedde; 30 Koda Glover; 47 Gio González; 62 Trevor Gott; 33 Matt Grace; 58 Jeremy Hellickson; 40 Kelvin Herrera; 56 Greg Holland; 27 Shawn Kelley; 21 Brandon Kintzler; 44 Ryan Madson; 61 Kyle McGowin; 60 Justin Miller; 46 Tommy Milone; 57 Tanner Roark; 68 Jefry Rodríguez; 72 Enny Romero; 41 Joe Ross; 31 Max Scherzer; 36 Sammy Solís; 37 Stephen Strasburg; 51 Wander Suero; 59 Carlos Torres; 50 Austin Voth; 53 Austen Williams	Catchers: 64 Spencer Kieboom; 14 Miguel Montero; 29 Pedro Severino; 32 Matt Wieters; Infielders: 15 Matt Adams; 1 Wilmer Difo; 20 Daniel Murphy; 6 Anthony Rendon; 14 Mark Reynolds; 19 Matt Reynolds; 5 Adrián Sánchez; 7 Trea Turner; 11 Ryan Zimmerman	Outfielders: 9 Rafael Bautista; 2 Adam Eaton; 8 Brian Goodwin; 34 Bryce Harper; 4 Howie Kendrick; 16 Víctor Robles; 49 Moisés Sierra; 22 Juan Soto; 45 Andrew Stevenson; 3 Michael A. Taylor	Manager: 4 Dave Martinez; Coaches: 35 Henry Blanco (bullpen); 24 Tim Bogar (first base); 25 Joe Dillon (assistant hitting); 10 Chip Hale (bench); 13 Bob Henley (third base); 38 Derek Lilliquist (pitching); 54 Kevin Long (hitting)

== Statistics ==
=== Regular season ===
==== Team leaders ====
Qualifying players only.

===== Batting =====
Stat	Player	Total
Avg.	Anthony Rendon	.308
HR	Bryce Harper	34
RBI	Bryce Harper	100
R	Bryce Harper; Trea Turner	103
H	Trea Turner	180
SB	Trea Turner	43

===== Pitching =====
Stat	Player	Total
W	Max Scherzer	18
L	Tanner Roark	15
ERA	Max Scherzer	2.53
SO	Max Scherzer	300
SV	Sean Doolittle	25
IP	Max Scherzer	220 2/3

=== Batting ===
Note: Pos = Position; G = Games played; AB = At bats; R = Runs scored; H = Hits; 2B = Doubles; 3B = Triples; HR = Home runs; RBI = Runs batted in; AVG = Batting average; SB = Stolen bases

Complete offensive statistics are available here.

Pos	Player	G	AB	R	H	2B	3B	HR	RBI	AVG	SB
C	Matt Wieters	76	235	24	56	8	0	8	30	.238	0
1B	Ryan Zimmerman	85	288	33	76	21	2	13	95	.264	1
2B	Wilmer Difo	148	408	55	94	14	7	7	42	.230	10
SS	Trea Turner	162	664	103	180	27	6	19	73	.271	43
3B	Anthony Rendon	136	529	88	163	44	2	24	92	.308	2
LF	Juan Soto	116	414	77	121	25	1	22	70	.292	5
CF	Michael A. Taylor	134	353	46	80	22	3	6	28	.227	24
RF	Bryce Harper	159	550	103	137	34	0	34	100	.249	13
RF	Adam Eaton	95	319	55	96	18	1	5	33	.301	9
1B	Matt Adams	94	249	37	64	9	0	18	48	.257	0
1B	Mark Reynolds	86	206	26	51	8	0	13	40	.248	0
C	Pedro Severino	70	190	14	32	9	0	2	15	.168	1
2B	Daniel Murphy	56	190	17	57	9	0	6	29	.300	1
2B	Howie Kendrick	40	152	17	46	14	0	4	12	.303	1
C	Spencer Kieboom	51	125	16	29	5	0	2	13	.232	0
OF	Andrew Stevenson	57	75	9	19	2	0	1	13	.253	1
OF	Brian Goodwin	48	65	9	13	1	0	2	12	.200	3
OF	Víctor Robles	21	59	8	17	3	1	3	10	.288	3
OF	Moisés Sierra	27	54	4	9	2	0	0	4	.167	1
IF	Adrián Sánchez	28	58	8	16	2	1	0	3	.276	0
IF	Matt Reynolds	12	13	1	2	0	0	0	1	.154	0
C	Miguel Montero	4	11	0	0	0	0	0	0	.000	0
OF	Rafael Bautista	9	6	1	0	0	0	0	0	.000	0
P	Max Scherzer	32	70	8	17	2	0	0	6	.243	1
P	Tanner Roark	29	58	6	11	2	1	0	8	.190	0
P	Stephen Strasburg	22	41	0	5	0	0	0	1	.122	0
P	Gio González	24	44	1	3	1	0	0	0	.068	0
P	Jeremy Hellickson	18	32	0	2	1	0	0	1	.063	0
P	Jefry Rodríguez	14	16	2	3	1	0	0	1	.188	0
P	Erick Fedde	10	16	1	1	1	0	0	0	.063	0
P	Tommy Milone	5	7	0	0	0	0	0	0	.000	0
P	Joe Ross	3	5	0	0	0	0	0	0	.000	0
P	A. J. Cole	4	3	1	1	0	0	1	1	.333	0
P	Wander Suero	38	3	0	0	0	0	0	0	.000	0
P	Matt Grace	54	3	0	1	0	0	0	0	.333	0
P	Kyle McGowin	5	2	1	0	0	0	0	0	.000	0
P	Austin Voth	4	2	0	0	0	0	0	0	.000	0
P	Shawn Kelley	32	1	0	0	0	0	0	0	.000	0
P	Justin Miller	46	1	0	0	0	0	0	0	.000	0
P	Austen L. Adams	2	0	0	0	0	0	0	0	–	0
P	Austen Williams	10	0	0	0	0	0	0	0	–	0
P	Greg Holland	24	0	0	0	0	0	0	0	–	0
P	Sean Doolittle	40	0	0	0	0	0	0	0	–	0
P	Trevor Gott	20	0	0	0	0	0	0	0	–	0
P	Sammy Solís	54	0	0	0	0	0	0	0	–	0
P	Jimmy Cordero	22	0	0	0	0	0	0	0	–	0
P	Ryan Madson	47	0	0	0	0	0	0	0	–	0
P	Carlos Torres	10	0	0	0	0	0	0	0	–	0
P	Kelvin Herrera	20	0	0	0	0	0	0	0	–	0
P	Enny Romero	2	0	0	0	0	0	0	0	–	0
P	Brandon Kintzler	44	0	0	0	0	0	0	0	–	0
P	Koda Glover	22	0	0	0	0	0	0	0	–	0
P	Tim Collins	362	0	0	0	0	0	0	0	–	0
	Team totals	162	5517	771	1402	284	25	191	737	.254	119

=== Pitching ===
Note: Pos = Position; W = Wins; L = Losses; ERA = Earned run average; G = Games pitched; GS = Games started; SV = Saves; IP = Innings pitched; H = Hits allowed; R = Runs allowed; ER = Earned runs allowed; BB = Walks allowed; K = Strikeouts

Complete pitching statistics are available here.

Pos	Player	W	L	ERA	G	GS	SV	IP	H	R	ER	BB	K
SP	Max Scherzer	18	7	2.53	33	33	0	220.2	150	66	62	51	300
SP	Tanner Roark	9	15	4.34	31	30	0	180.1	181	90	87	50	146
SP	Gio González	7	11	4.57	27	27	0	145.2	153	77	74	70	126
SP	Stephen Strasburg	10	7	3.74	22	22	0	130.0	118	59	54	38	156
SP	Jeremy Hellickson	5	3	3.45	19	19	0	91.1	78	41	35	20	65
SP	Erick Fedde	2	4	5.54	11	11	0	50.1	55	31	31	22	46
CL	Sean Doolittle	3	3	1.60	43	0	25	45.0	21	8	8	6	60
RP	Matt Grace	1	1	2.87	56	0	0	59.2	55	22	19	13	48
RP	Justin Miller	7	1	3.61	51	0	2	52.1	42	22	21	17	60
RP	Ryan Madson	2	5	5.28	40	0	4	41.1	48	28	26	15	41
RP	Sammy Solís	1	2	6.41	56	0	0	39.1	43	28	289	18	44
	Jefry Rodríguez	3	3	5.71	14	8	0	52.0	43	35	33	37	39
	Wander Suero	4	1	3.59	40	0	0	47.2	43	20	19	15	47
	Brandon Kintzler	1	2	3.59	45	0	2	42.2	40	17	17	13	31
	Shawn Kelley	1	0	3.34	35	0	0	32.1	26	12	12	5	32
	Tommy Milone	1	1	5.81	5	4	0	26.1	37	17	17	1	23
	Tim Collins	0	0	4.37	38	0	0	22.2	23	11	11	12	21
	Greg Holland	2	0	0.84	24	0	3	21.1	9	2	2	10	25
	Trevor Gott	0	2	5.68	20	0	0	19.0	19	13	12	10	15
	Jimmy Cordero	1	2	5.68	22	0	0	19.0	23	13	12	12	12
	Kelvin Herrera	1	2	4.34	21	0	3	18.2	24	9	9	8	16
	Koda Glover	1	3	3.31	21	0	1	16.1	13	6	6	10	9
	Joe Ross	0	2	5.06	3	3	0	16.0	17	10	9	4	7
	Austin Voth	1	1	6.57	4	2	0	12.1	12	9	9	6	11
	A. J. Cole	1	1	13.06	4	2	0	10.1	16	15	15	6	10
	Carlos Torres	0	0	6.52	10	0	0	9.2	9	7	7	3	9
	Austen Williams	0	1	5.59	10	0	0	9.2	10	6	6	6	8
	Kyle McGowin	0	0	5.87	5	1	0	7.2	6	5	5	5	8
	Enny Romero	0	0	13.50	2	0	0	2.0	5	3	3	1	2
	Austin L. Adams	0	0	0.00	2	0	0	1.0	1	0	0	3	0
	Mark Reynolds	0	0	0.00	1	0	0	0.1	0	0	0	0	0
	Team totals	82	80	4.04	162	162	40	1446.0	1320	682	649	487	1417

== Awards and honors ==
=== All-Stars ===
- Bryce Harper, OF
- Max Scherzer, P
- Sean Doolittle, P

On July 8, outfielder Bryce Harper, starting pitcher Max Scherzer, and closer Sean Doolittle were named to the National League team for the 2018 Major League Baseball All-Star Game. Harper was the only Nationals player voted into the game by fans, and it was his sixth all-star selection and will be his fifth start, a Montreal-Washington franchise record. Scherzer was named as an all-star for the sixth straight season, four of them as a National. Doolittle made the All-Star team for the second time, and the first time since he represented Oakland in 2014.

Harper agreed to participate in the 2018 Home Run Derby at Nationals Park the day before the All-Star Game. It was the second Home Run Derby appearance of his career, and he won it for the first time.

== Farm system ==
Level	Team	League	Manager
AAA	Syracuse Chiefs	International League	Randy Knorr
AA	Harrisburg Senators	Eastern League	Matthew LeCroy
A-Advanced	Potomac Nationals	Carolina League	Tripp Keister
A	Hagerstown Suns	South Atlantic League	Patrick Anderson
A-Short Season	Auburn Doubledays	New York–Penn League	Jerad Head
Rookie	GCL Nationals	Gulf Coast League	Mario Lisson
Rookie	DSL Nationals	Dominican Summer League	Sandy Martínez

=== Class AAA ===
In October 2017, the New York Mets announced that they would purchase the Syracuse Chiefs from the Community Baseball Club of Central New York. Under the deal, the Community Baseball Club of Central New York's ownership of the Chiefs and the Chiefs' affiliation with the Washington Nationals – which had begun in 2009 – continued through the end of the 2018 season. After the conclusion of the season, the Mets would take ownership of and operate the Chiefs, with Syracuse – renamed the Syracuse Mets in October 2018 – becoming the Mets' Class AAA affiliate beginning with the 2019 season.

On September 18, 2018, the Nationals and the Fresno Grizzlies of the Pacific Coast League announced that they had struck a two-year player-development deal that would make Fresno the Nationals' Class AAA affiliate beginning in the 2019 season.

=== Class A-Advanced ===
In June 2018, Potomac Nationals owner Art Silber announced that he had signed a letter of intent to build a new stadium in Fredericksburg, Virginia, that would open in April 2020. During the 2018–2019 offseason, the Fredericksburg city council gave unanimous final approval on November 13, 2018, for the Silber family to finance, build, and maintain the new stadium. Plans thus called for the 2019 season to be the 36th and last for the Potomac Nationals at Pfitzner Stadium in Woodbridge, Virginia, where they had played since 1984.
