= Austen Williams =

American baseball player (born 1992)

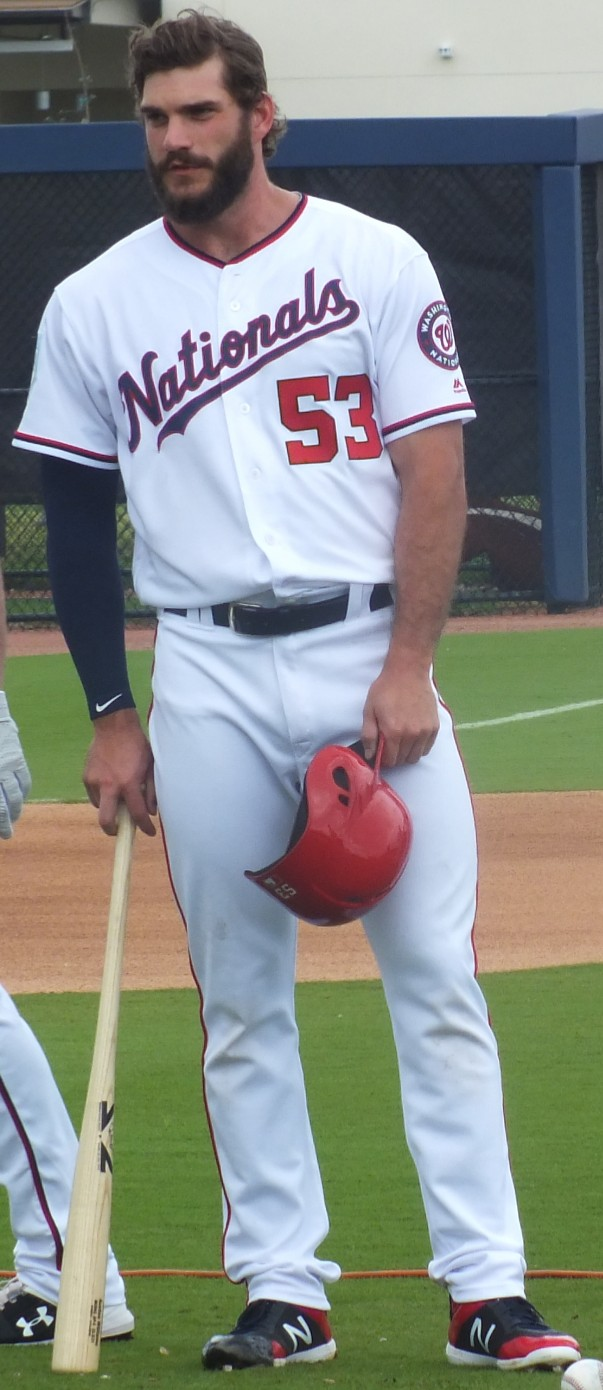
- Williams with the Washington Nationals in 2019 spring training
- Pitcher
- Born: December 19, 1992 (age 33); Fort Worth, Texas, U.S.
- Batted: Right Threw: Right

MLB debut
- September 2, 2018, for the Washington Nationals

Last MLB appearance
- April 17, 2019, for the Washington Nationals

MLB statistics
- Win–loss record: 0–1
- Earned run average: 10.80
- Strikeouts: 9
- Stats at Baseball Reference

Teams
- Washington Nationals (2018–2019)

Austen Thomas Williams (born December 19, 1992) is an American former professional baseball pitcher who played for the Washington Nationals of Major League Baseball (MLB) in 2018 and 2019.

== Career ==
After graduating from Southwest Christian School, Williams enrolled at Texas State University where he played college baseball. He was drafted by the Washington Nationals in the sixth round of the 2014 MLB draft. Williams struggled in 2016 and 2017, including in the Arizona Fall League, where he pitched for the Mesa Solar Sox. Moved from the rotation into the bullpen as a multi-inning reliever in 2018, Williams prospered for the Double–A Harrisburg Senators, being named an Eastern League All-Star and earning a promotion by August to the Triple–A Syracuse Chiefs for the first time.

After Williams posted a 1.19 ERA across 68 innings for Double–A Harrisburg and Triple–A Syracuse, the Nationals selected Williams' contract on September 1, 2018, adding him to the major league pitching staff following a trade that sent Gio González to the Milwaukee Brewers. He made his major league debut the next day, striking out two Brewers in two relief innings.

Williams did not appear for Washington in 2020, and did not play in a game for the organization due to the cancellation of the minor league season because of the COVID-19 pandemic. He was removed from the 40–man roster and sent outright to the Triple–A Fresno Grizzlies on October 9, 2020. Williams became a free agent on November 2.

== Pitching style ==
On the mound, Williams employs a three-pitch mix, with a sinking fastball that tops out around 96 miles per hour (154 km/h), a breaking ball variously described as a curveball or a slider, and a changeup. Since moving to the bullpen after the 2017 season, Williams has focused more on a fastball-slider combination while building his velocity.
