= 2019 Washington Nationals postseason =

2019 Washington Nationals
- World Series Champions; National League Champions; National League Wild Card
- League: National League
- Division: East Division
- Ballpark: Nationals Park
- City: Washington, D.C.
- Record: 93–69 (.574)
- Divisional place: 2nd
- Owners: Mark Lerner
- General managers: Mike Rizzo
- Managers: Dave Martinez
- Television: MASN (Bob Carpenter, FP Santangelo, Alex Chappell, Dan Kolko, Bo Porter)
- Radio: 106.7 The Fan; Washington Nationals Radio Network (Charlie Slowes, Dave Jageler)

In 2019, the Washington Nationals advanced to the World Series for the first time in franchise history and also Washington, D.C.'s first appearance in the World Series since the American League's Senators in 1933. They proceeded to defeat the Houston Astros in seven games to win the franchise's first World Series championship, and the first for Washington, D.C. since 1924.

== Game log ==
2019 postseason game log: 12–5 (Home: 4–4; Away: 8–1)
National League Wild Card game: 1–0 (Home: 1–0; Away: 0–0)

#	Date	Opponent	Score	Win	Loss	Save	Attendance	Series
1	October 1	Brewers	4–3	Strasburg (1–0)	Hader (0–1)	Hudson (1)	42,993	1–0

National League Division Series: 3–2 (Home: 1–1; Away: 2–1)

#	Date	Opponent	Score	Win	Loss	Save	Attendance	Record
1	October 3	@ Dodgers	0–6	Buehler (1–0)	Corbin (0–1)	—	53,095	0–1
2	October 4	@ Dodgers	4–2	Strasburg (1–0)	Kershaw (0–1)	Hudson (1)	53,086	1–1
3	October 6	Dodgers	4–10	Ryu (1–0)	Corbin (0–2)	—	43,423	1–2
4	October 7	Dodgers	6–1	Scherzer (1–0)	Urías (0–1)	—	36,847	2–2
5	October 9	@ Dodgers	7–3 (10)	Hudson (1–0)	Kelly (0–1)	—	54,159	3–2

National League Championship Series: 4–0 (Home: 2–0; Away: 2–0)

#	Date	Opponent	Score	Win	Loss	Save	Attendance	Record
1	October 11	@ Cardinals	2–0	Sánchez (1–0)	Mikolas (0–1)	Doolittle (1)	45,075	1–0
2	October 12	@ Cardinals	3–1	Scherzer (1–0)	Wainwright (0–1)	Hudson (1)	46,458	2–0
3	October 14	Cardinals	8–1	Strasburg (1–0)	Flaherty (0–1)	—	43,675	3–0
4	October 15	Cardinals	7–4	Corbin (1–0)	Hudson (0–1)	Hudson (2)	43,976	4–0

World Series: 4–3 (Home: 0–3; Away: 4–0)

#	Date	Opponent	Score	Win	Loss	Save	Attendance	Record
1	October 22	@ Astros	5–4	Scherzer (1–0)	Cole (0–1)	Doolittle (1)	43,339	1–0
2	October 23	@ Astros	12–3	Strasburg (1–0)	Verlander (0–1)	—	43,357	2–0
3	October 25	Astros	1–4	James (1–0)	Sánchez (0–1)	Osuna (1)	43,867	2–1
4	October 26	Astros	1–8	Urquidy (1–0)	Corbin (0–1)	—	43,889	2–2
5	October 27	Astros	1–7	Cole (1–1)	Ross (0–1)	—	43,910	2–3
6	October 29	@ Astros	7–2	Strasburg (2–0)	Verlander (0–2)	—	43,384	3–3
7	October 30	@ Astros	6–2	Corbin (1–1)	Harris (0–1)	—	43,326	4–3

== Wild-Card Game, October 1 ==
Tuesday, October 1, 2019 8:08 pm EDT at Nationals Park in Washington, D.C.
Team	1	2	3	4	5	6	7	8	9	R	H	E
Milwaukee	2	1	0	0	0	0	0	0	0	3	7	2
Washington	0	0	1	0	0	0	0	3	X	4	5	0
Starting pitchers: MIL: Brandon Woodruff (0–0); WAS: Max Scherzer (0–0); WP: Stephen Strasburg (1–0) LP: Josh Hader (0–1) Sv: Daniel Hudson (1); Home runs: MIL: Yasmani Grandal, Eric Thames; WAS: Trea Turner; Attendance: 42,993

Scherzer walked the Brewers′ first batter, right fielder Trent Grisham, and then gave up a home run in the next Milwaukee at-bat to catcher Yasmani Grandal. In the second inning, Milwaukee first baseman Eric Thames led off with a solo home run, and the Nationals trailed 3–0. Against Milwaukee starter Brandon Woodruff, the Nationals managed only two hits, although one of them was a home run that shortstop Trea Turner hit in the bottom of the third to cut Milwaukee's lead to 3–1. In the bottom of the eighth inning, Milwaukee closer Josh Hader came in for a potential six-out save. Michael A. Taylor pinch-hit for Strasburg and reached first when the umpiring crew ruled that a pitch which appeared either to have hit Taylor or the knob of his bat had in fact hit him, and a Brewers challenge resulted in that decision being upheld. Ryan Zimmerman hit a broken-bat single to center, advancing Taylor to third. After Andrew Stevenson came in to pinch-run for Zimmerman, Anthony Rendon walked on a full count to load the bases. Juan Soto then singled to right and outfielder Trent Grisham misplayed the ball; by the time Soto was tagged out between second and third to end the inning, Taylor, Stevenson, and Rendon all had scored to give the Nationals a 4–3 lead, their first lead of the game. Soto, with his back to the play and unsure whether the throw was going to home or third, pulled up between bases to bait the Brewers into catching him in a rundown, thus ensuring that Rendon would score the go-ahead run before Soto could be tagged out. Daniel Hudson then closed for the Nats, giving up one hit in a scoreless ninth inning and earning a save to lock down a 4–3 victory.

== Division Series ==
=== Game 1, October 3 ===
Thursday, October 3, 2019 8:37 pm EDT at Dodger Stadium in Los Angeles, California
Team	1	2	3	4	5	6	7	8	9	R	H	E
Washington	0	0	0	0	0	0	0	0	0	0	2	2
Los Angeles	1	0	0	0	1	0	2	2	X	6	7	0
WP: Walker Buehler (1–0) LP: Patrick Corbin (0–1) Sv: none Home runs: WAS: none LAD: Gavin Lux, Joc Pederson; Attendance: 53,095

The Dodgers scored their first run in the first inning without ever putting the ball in play. Catcher Yan Gomes had a passed ball, and Corbin became only the second pitcher ever to walk four batters in the first inning of his first postseason appearance. (Note: The only other pitcher to walk four batters in the first inning of the first postseason appearance of his career was Art Reinhart of the St. Louis Cardinals, who walked four batters – including Lou Gehrig and Babe Ruth – in the fifth inning of Game 4 the 1926 World Series against the New York Yankees (See Anonymous, "Buehler, Muncy lead Dodgers past Nats 6–0 in NLDS opener," Associated Press, October 4, 2019, 12:10 a.m.)) Corbin then retired seven of the next eight Los Angeles batters. Corbin allowed consecutive singles to second baseman Max Muncy and shortstop Corey Seager to start the fourth inning, although he kept Los Angeles from adding to its lead. In the fifth inning, however, he walked center fielder Cody Bellinger with two outs and gave up a single to right fielder Chris Taylor that advanced Bellinger to third, after which Kendrick committed another error on a Muncy grounder that allowed Bellinger to score and stake Los Angeles to a 2–0 lead; Taylor was thrown out at home to end the inning. Corbin left the game after six innings, having thrown 107 pitches, 62 for strikes, and striking out nine Dodgers while walking five and giving up three hits.

For the Dodgers, Buehler allowed only one base runner – on a second-inning single by left fielder Juan Soto – through the first three innings. The Nats threatened to tie the game at 1–1 in the fourth inning when right fielder Adam Eaton, third baseman Anthony Rendon, and Kendrick all walked, but Buehler got second baseman Asdrúbal Cabrera to ground out to end the inning and kept Washington off the board. Like Corbin, Buehler pitched six innings; he walked three, struck out eight, allowed only one hit, and threw 100 pitches, 62 of them strikes. He retired the last seven batters he faced and left the game with a 2–0 lead.

Against Los Angeles relievers Adam Kolarek, Kenta Maeda, and Joe Kelly, the Nationals offense managed only more hit, a double by shortstop Trea Turner in the ninth, their only base runner after the fourth inning; the Dodgers pitching staff finished with a combined 13 strikeouts, giving up only three walks. The Washington bullpen fared poorly, allowing four hits, two walks, and four earned runs over two innings of work. With one out in the seventh, Nationals reliever Tanner Rainey – making the first postseason appearance of his career – walked pinch hitter Joc Pederson and gave up a single to third baseman Justin Turner. Fernando Rodney came in to relieve Rainey, walked Taylor to load the bases, and allowed a two-out single to Muncy that scored Bellinger and Turner and stretched the Dodgers′ lead to 4–0. In the eighth inning, Hunter Strickland gave up two solo homers, to pitch hitter Gavin Lux and Pederson. The Dodgers shut out the Nationals on two hits and won 6–0 to take a 1–0 series lead. Los Angeles extended its winning streak to eight games, dating back into the regular season, while Washington's winning streak in the regular season and postseason combined ended at nine. This would be Washington's only road loss in their World Series run; following this game, they would win eight straight road games to clinch the title.

=== Game 2, October 4 ===
9:37 p.m. (EDT) at Dodger Stadium in Los Angeles, California

Starting for Los Angeles, three-time Cy Young Award-winner Clayton Kershaw had a rocky first inning, giving up a double to Washington's leadoff hitter, shortstop Trea Turner, on the first pitch of the game. He then issued a one-out walk to third baseman Anthony Rendon and hit left fielder Juan Soto with a pitch to load the bases. Second baseman Howie Kendrick singled to drive in Turner from third base before Kershaw got out of the first inning without further damage. In the second inning, Kershaw hit the Nats leadoff hitter, center fielder Victor Robles, with a pitch, and Robles reached second on a sacrifice bunt by pitcher Stephen Strasburg. Right fielder Adam Eaton drove in Robles with a single, and Rendon doubled to score Eaton and make the score 3–0. Over the next four innings, Kershaw only gave up two more hits, and he finished his outing with four strikeouts and a walk, having given up three runs on six hits in six innings of work.

Strasburg had thrown 34 pitches in relief during the wild-card game three days earlier, but returned to the mound to start Game 2 for the Nationals on the shortest rest between appearances of his career. Retiring the first 14 batters he faced, he pitched a perfect game through 4 2/3 innings, no Dodger reaching first base until catcher Will Smith singled with two outs in the fifth inning. Strasburg's 23-game postseason scoreless streak, which dated back to the 2014 National League Division Series, finally came to an end in the sixth inning when Dodgers pinch hitter Matt Beaty singled, advanced to third on a double by right fielder Joc Pederson, and scored on a sacrifice fly by third baseman Justin Turner. With the Nats winning 3–1, Strasburg left the game after throwing 85 pitches over six innings of three-hit, one-run ball, issuing no walks and striking out ten Dodgers. He lowered his career postseason ERA to 0.64, passing Dodgers great Sandy Koufax – who was in the stands at Dodger Stadium for Game 2 – for the best career postseason ERA in history for a pitcher with at least four postseason starts. (Note: Sandy Koufax′s career postseason ERA is 0.95. (See Anonymous, "Stephen Strasburg, Max Scherzer dominate Dodgers in Game 2," Associated Press, October 5, 2019, 1:26 a.m. Retrieved October 5, 2019.)) By the time he completed his outing, Strasburg had allowed only one run and struck out 14 batters over nine innings of work during the 2019 postseason; for his career, he had pitched 28 postseason innings, striking out 38, walking only four, and allowing his opponents a batting average of only .192.

The Dodgers closed to a 3–2 deficit when first baseman Max Muncy hit a 413-foot (126 m) solo homer off reliever Sean Doolittle in the seventh inning. In the top of the eighth inning, the Nationals extended their lead to 4–2 when first baseman Ryan Zimmerman doubled, advanced to third on a sacrifice bunt by Robles, and scored on an Asdrúbal Cabrera pinch-hit single; Robles left the game after his bunt with what Nationals manager Dave Martinez described postgame as a "minor hamstring issue." Martinez surprised Dodgers manager Dave Roberts by bringing Max Scherzer – who Martinez had earlier announced as the starter for Game 3 – to pitch the bottom of the eighth in Game 2; making the fourth postseason relief appearance of his career, Scherzer struck out the side on 14 pitches, hitting 99 miles per hour (159 km/h) despite having thrown 77 pitches in the wild-card game he had started three days earlier.

In the bottom of the ninth, Daniel Hudson came in to close for Washington with the Nationals still leading 4–2. Justin Turner led off against Hudson with a ground-rule double, but then Hudson struck out left fielder A. J. Pollock and Anthony Rendon made a twisting, turning catch, falling to the ground to grab a pop fly to shallow left field by center fielder Cody Bellinger for the second out. Martinez then made a risky decision, intentionally walking the hot-hitting Muncy and bringing the potential winning run to the plate in the form of Will Smith. Hudson walked Smith on four pitches to load the bases before striking out shortstop Corey Seager for the final out. Washington's pitching staff combined to strike out 17 Dodgers, and the Nationals won 4–2, snapping an eight-game Dodgers winning streak dating back into the regular season and evening the series at 1–1.

Friday, October 4, 2019 9:37 pm EDT at Dodger Stadium in Los Angeles, California
Team	1	2	3	4	5	6	7	8	9	R	H	E
Washington	1	2	0	0	0	0	0	1	0	4	10	0
Los Angeles	0	0	0	0	0	1	1	0	0	2	5	1
Starting pitchers: WAS: Stephen Strasburg (0–0); LAD: Clayton Kershaw (0–0); WP: Stephen Strasburg (1–0) LP: Clayton Kershaw (0–1) Sv: Daniel Hudson (1); Home runs: WAS: none LAD: Max Muncy; Attendance: 53,086

=== Game 3, October 6 ===
7:45 p.m. (EDT) at Nationals Park in Washington, D.C.

Nationals manager Dave Martinez originally planned to have Max Scherzer start Game 3, but after Scherzer threw an inning of relief in Game 2, he opted to give Aníbal Sánchez the start instead and switched Scherzer's start to Game 4. Sánchez got into a bases-loaded jam in the first inning on two walks and a single, but he kept Los Angeles from scoring until the fifth inning, when first baseman Max Muncy hit a solo home run. Meanwhile, the Nationals – with center fielder Victor Robles sitting out the game with a minor hamstring injury – jumped on Dodgers starter Hyun-jin Ryu in the first inning, when Adam Eaton walked and left fielder Juan Soto hit a two-run homer, Washington's first homer of the series. Ryu left the game after five innings with the Nationals leading 2–1; he had given up four hits and two walks and struck out three during his outing.

Sánchez also pitched five very effective innings and scattered four hits, with nine strikeouts and a walk. By the end of the fifth, he had thrown 87 pitches and faced the Dodgers′ lineup twice, and statistics showed that his performance tended to decline if he faced an opponent's order a third time, so Martinez took him out of the game. Not believing he could rely on his middle relievers to preserve close leads – Washington's bullpen had finished the regular season with the worst ERA in the National League – Martinez brought in starter Patrick Corbin to pitch what turned out to be the decisive sixth inning. Pitching on three days of rest after throwing 107 pitches in six innings in Game 1 and making his first relief appearance since a single appearance in relief for the Arizona Diamondbacks during the 2017 season, Corbin gave up a single to the Dodgers′ leadoff hitter, center fielder Cody Bellinger, but followed that by striking out shortstop Corey Seager and left fielder A. J. Pollock in consecutive at-bats. Then Corbin's slider failed him, and his outing unraveled. Pinch-hitter David Freese singled, advancing Bellinger to third, and catcher Russell Martin doubled on a 2–2 count, scoring Bellinger and Freese to give Los Angeles a 3–2 lead. Corbin walked pinch hitter Chris Taylor on five pitches, then gave up a double on a 1–2 count to pinch hitter Enrique Hernández that scored Martin and Taylor and stretched the Dodgers′ lead to 5–2. The Nationals then intentionally walked Muncy before taking Corbin out of the game after 35 pitches over two-thirds of an inning. Wander Suero relieved Corbin and faced third baseman Justin Turner, who worked the count full and then hit a three-run homer to make the score 8–2. Bellinger followed with a double before Suero induced a groundout by Seager to bring the inning to a close. Eleven Dodgers had come to the plate, and Los Angeles became the first MLB team in history to score seven two-out, two-strike runs in a single postseason inning.

Despite the shocking turn of events in the top of the sixth, the Nationals staged a rally in the bottom of the inning. Joe Kelly came in to pitch in relief for Los Angeles and was ineffective, issuing consecutive walks to third baseman Anthony Rendon and left fielder Juan Soto before giving up a single to second baseman Howie Kendrick that loaded the bases with no outs. Kelly then threw a wild pitch, allowing Rendon to score from third and the other runners to move up, and walked catcher Yan Gomes to load the bases again. Julio Urías relieved Kelly and faced pinch hitter Asdrúbal Cabrera, who hit a sacrifice fly that scored Soto from third but turned into a double play when Kendrick was thrown out trying to tag at second and reach third. Nearly an hour after it began, the sixth inning finally ended when center fielder Michael A. Taylor popped out, ending the Nationals rally with the score 8–4.

In the seventh inning, Nationals reliever Fernando Rodney gave up a double to Freese and a walk to Martin with one out, then walked Hernández with two outs to load the bases, but got out of the inning without the Dodgers adding to their lead. In the ninth inning, however, Hunter Strickland came in to pitch and gave up two more runs to Los Angeles against the first two batters he faced, surrendering a single to Freese and a two-run homer to Martin. The Dodgers won 10–4 and took a 2–1 lead in the series.

Sunday, October 6, 2019 7:45 pm EDT at Nationals Park in Washington, D.C.
Team	1	2	3	4	5	6	7	8	9	R	H	E
Los Angeles	0	0	0	0	1	7	0	0	2	10	14	0
Washington	2	0	0	0	0	2	0	0	0	4	6	0
Starting pitchers: LAD: Hyun-jin Ryu (0–0); WAS: Aníbal Sánchez (0–0); WP: Hyun-jin Ryu (1–0) LP: Patrick Corbin (0–2) Sv: none Home runs: LAD: Russell Martin, Max Muncy, Justin Turner; WAS: Juan Soto; Attendance: 43,423

=== Game 4, October 7 ===
6:40 p.m. (EDT) at Nationals Park in Washington, D.C.

After Alexander Ovechkin, team captain of the National Hockey League′s Washington Capitals, threw the ceremonial first pitch, Max Scherzer took the mound at Nationals Park as the Nats faced elimination in Game 4. He gave up a two-out solo home run to third baseman Justin Turner in the top of the first inning on his tenth pitch of the game, but through the sixth inning gave up only two more hits, allowing the Dodgers no further runs. Over one stretch from the second to the seventh inning, he retired 14 of the 15 batters he faced.

Behind 1–0 early on the Justin Turner homer, the Nationals mounted their first scoring threat against Los Angeles starter Rich Hill in the third inning. Starting in center field for the second straight game while Victor Robles continued his recovery from his minor hamstring injury in Game 2, Michael A. Taylor led off with a walk. Shortstop Trea Turner followed with a one-out single that advanced Taylor to third, right fielder Adam Eaton walked to load the bases, and third baseman Anthony Rendon scored Taylor from third on a sacrifice fly to tie the game at 1–1. Left fielder Juan Soto walked to load the bases again before Kenta Maeda relieved Hill and got second baseman Howie Kendrick to ground out to end the inning.

The game remained a 1–1 tie until Washington's offense broke out in the bottom of the fifth inning. Julio Urías came in to pitch for Los Angeles, and Trea Turner promptly singled and advanced to third on a sacrifice bunt by Eaton. Rendon then singled, scoring Turner and giving the Nationals their first lead at 2–1. With two outs, Kendrick singled, advancing Rendon to third, and Pedro Báez replaced Urías on the mound. Then first baseman Ryan Zimmerman – in his 15th season with Washington and playing amid speculation among fans and the press that he could be playing his final game at Nationals Park – came to bat and hit Báez's second pitch 414 feet (126 m) onto the batter's eye in center field, a three-run homer that give the Nationals a 5–1 lead. Catcher Kurt Suzuki followed with a walk and Taylor with a single that advanced Suzuki to second before Scherzer – the ninth man to bat in the inning – grounded out after an eight-pitch at-bat. The Nationals added to their lead in the bottom of the sixth, when Turner led off with a ground-rule double off Dodgers reliever Ross Stripling, advanced to third on a Stripling wild pitch, and scored on another Rendon sacrifice fly to make the score 6–1.

Finally tiring with one out in the seventh inning, Scherzer allowed a single to left fielder Matt Beaty and walked second baseman Gavin Lux and catcher Will Smith, but, with the bases loaded, he struck out pinch hitter Chris Taylor and induced a groundout by right fielder Joc Pederson – who narrowly missed a bases-clearing double or triple when he drove Scherzer's first pitch hard down the right field line, only to have it land about an inch (2.5 cm) foul – to keep the Dodgers from scoring. At the end of the inning, Scherzer left the game after 109 pitches – 72 of them strikes – allowing only four hits, walking three, and striking out seven. During the remainder of the game, each team managed only one single. Sean Doolittle and Daniel Hudson combined to pitch a scoreless final two innings for Washington, and the Nationals won 6–1, evening the series at 2–2 and forcing a decisive Game 5 at Dodger Stadium two nights later.

With entire sections in the upper deck nearly empty, Game 4 was the first playoff game in the history of Nationals Park that did not sell out, drawing only 36,847 fans, filling the stadium to only 89 percent of its capacity. It was one of three MLB Division Series games that did not sell out that day; the NLDS game at St. Louis and the 2019 American League Division Series game at Tampa Bay also did not sell out.

Monday, October 7, 2019 6:40 pm EDT at Nationals Park in Washington, D.C.
Team	1	2	3	4	5	6	7	8	9	R	H	E
Los Angeles	1	0	0	0	0	0	0	0	0	1	5	0
Washington	0	0	1	0	4	1	0	0	X	6	10	0
Starting pitchers: LAD: Rich Hill (0–0); WAS: Max Scherzer (0–0); WP: Max Scherzer (1–0) LP: Julio Urías (0–1) Sv: none Home runs: LAD: Justin Turner; WAS: Ryan Zimmerman; Attendance: 36,847

=== Game 5, October 9 ===
8:37 p.m. (EDT) at Dodger Stadium in Los Angeles, California

The Nationals opened Nationals Park to fans for a free watch party – televising the game on the stadium's scoreboard – for Game 5, which took place 2,500 miles (4,000 km) away at Dodger Stadium. It was Washington's third elimination game in eight days, and since moving to Washington the team had lost all three times it had played in Game 5 of a National League Division Series previously. Making his third postseason appearance, Stephen Strasburg started, and Los Angeles jumped on him early: Right fielder Joc Pederson hit a lead-off ground-rule double and the next Dodgers batter, second baseman Max Muncy – previously 0-for-12 against Strasburg – connected on Strasburg's eighth pitch of the game for a two-run homer over the center field wall. Strasburg continued to labor in the first, giving up a walk and a single before inducing shortstop Corey Seager to ground into an inning-ending double play without allowing Los Angeles to add to its lead. In the second inning, however, Dodgers left fielder Enrique Hernández led off with a solo homer to center on Strasburg's second pitch of the inning to give Los Angeles an early 3–0 lead; it was Hernández's third home run in six career at-bats against Strasburg. Strasburg was far more effective after that, scattering three more singles and leaving the game after six innings with the score still 3–0. Throwing 105 pitches, he allowed six hits, struck out seven, and walked only one Dodger. Tanner Rainey and Patrick Corbin combined to pitch a perfect seventh inning in relief of Strasburg. He left the game having thrown 224 pitches in the 2019 postseason, more than any other MLB pitcher through the end of the four division series.

The Nationals offense had less success against Dodgers starter Walker Buehler, who had one-hit Washington in six innings of work six days earlier in Game 1. This time, Buehler allowed only a single to first baseman Ryan Zimmerman and a walk to Strasburg during the first four innings. The Nationals mounted their first scoring threat in the fifth inning, when catcher Kurt Suzuki led off with a walk and center fielder Michael A. Taylor – starting for the third straight game in place of the injured Victor Robles – followed with a single that advanced Suzuki to second, but Buehler struck out Strasburg and shortstop Trea Turner and got right fielder Adam Eaton to fly out, keeping the Nats off the board. The Nationals finally broke through against Buehler in the sixth inning, when third baseman Anthony Rendon hit a lead-off double and left fielder Juan Soto singled to drive in Rendon, but Buehler got out of the inning without further damage on a double play and a strikeout, and the inning ended with Los Angeles leading 3–1.

The Nationals again pressed Buehler in the seventh inning. Suzuki led off, and Buehler's fourth pitch ricocheted off his wrist and hit him in the face, a frightening turn of events that forced him to leave the game escorted by the Nationals′ training staff; Yan Gomes came in to pinch run for him and took over the catching duties. Trea Turner then drew a two-out walk, and Dodgers manager Dave Roberts decided to take Buehler out of the game; Buehler left having thrown 117 pitches, giving up four hits and three walks while striking out seven in 6 2/3 innings. Roberts brought in ace starter Clayton Kershaw to relieve Buehler, and Kershaw got out of the inning by striking out Eaton. When he returned to the mound to pitch the eighth inning, however, he faltered and the Nationals′ fortunes began to turn around. Rendon led off with a line-drive homer to center on Kershaw's second pitch of the inning to make the score 3–2 and quiet the crowd, and on Kershaw's next pitch Soto hit a towering 449-foot (137 m) home run – the longest of his career at the time – into the right center field stands, tying the game at 3–3. Kenta Maeda relieved Kershaw and ended the inning on three consecutive strikeouts.

Corbin pitched the bottom of the eighth, allowing only one base runner when he hit third baseman Justin Turner with a pitch. Joe Kelly, who had been ineffective in his Game 3 appearance, pitched the top of the ninth for Los Angeles with far greater success and struck out the side. In the bottom of the ninth, Nationals reliever Daniel Hudson gave up a one-out single to Enrique Hernández, and in the next at-bat Dodgers catcher Will Smith hit a deep fly ball to right field that prompted Dodgers players to emerge from their dugout in anticipation of celebrating a two-run homer and a walk-off win, but instead the ball settled into Eaton's glove deep on the warning track for the second out. Los Angeles did not score, and the game went into extra innings, still tied at 3–3.

Roberts opted to have Kelly return to the mound to pitch the top of the 10th inning. Kelly walked Eaton to begin the inning, then gave up a ground rule double to Rendon that advanced Eaton to third. The Dodgers then intentionally walked Soto, and second baseman Howie Kendrick came to the plate with no outs and the bases loaded. Kendrick was 0-for-4 in the game and had had a difficult division series, going 4-for-19 (.211), making a baserunning error in Game 3, hitting into a rally-killing double play in Game 4, and committing three errors in the field, two of them in Game 1 and one earlier in Game 5, but after fouling off Kelly's first pitch he hit Kelly's second one 410 feet (120 m) over the wall in dead center field for his second career grand slam. Only the second postseason extra-inning grand slam in MLB history, (Note: The only other MLB player to hit a postseason extra-inning grand slam was Nelson Cruz, who did it for the Texas Rangers in the bottom of the 11th inning during Game 2 of the 2011 American League Championship Series against the Detroit Tigers. (See Anonymous, "Nats stun Dodgers on Kendrick's 10th-inning slam," Associated Press, October 10, 2019, Retrieved October 11, 2019)) it gave the Nationals a 7–3 lead and prompted Los Angeles fans to start heading for the exits. After Kelly also gave up a one-out single to Gomes, Roberts was roundly booed by the Los Angeles home crowd when he appeared on the field to take Kelly out of the game. Kenley Jansen relieved Kelly and got the final two outs.

In the bottom of the 10th, Dodgers hitters faced Sean Doolittle, who pitched a perfect inning, the game ending on a spectacular diving catch in shallow center field by Michael A. Taylor to retire Justin Turner for the third out. The Nationals won the game 7–3 and the series 3–2. For the first time since arriving in Washington in 2005 and only the second time in Montreal-Washington franchise history, the team won a playoff series. (Note: The only previous team in Montreal-Washington franchise history to win a playoff series was the 1981 Montreal Expos, who won the 1981 National League Division Series against the Philadelphia Phillies, but lost the 1981 National League Championship Series to the Los Angeles Dodgers. (See {Anonymous, "Nats stun Dodgers on Kendrick's 10th-inning slam," Associated Press, October 10, 2019, Retrieved October 11, 2019)) It was also the first time a Washington, D.C., MLB team had won a postseason series since the original Washington Senators won the 1924 World Series. The Nationals became the first team in MLB history to come from three or more runs behind to win an elimination game twice during the same postseason, and they advanced to the National League Championship Series to face the St. Louis Cardinals.

Wednesday, October 9, 2019 8:37 pm EDT at Dodger Stadium in Los Angeles, California
Team	1	2	3	4	5	6	7	8	9	10	R	H	E
Washington	0	0	0	0	0	1	0	2	0	4	7	9	1
Los Angeles	2	1	0	0	0	0	0	0	0	0	3	7	1
Starting pitchers: WAS: Stephen Strasburg (2–0); LAD: Walker Buehler (1–0); WP: Daniel Hudson (1–0) LP: Joe Kelly (1–0) Sv: none Home runs: WAS: Howie Kendrick, Anthony Rendon, Juan Soto; LAD: Enrique Hernández, Max Muncy; Attendance: 54,159

=== Composite line score ===
2019 NLDS (3–2): Washington Nationals defeated Los Angeles Dodgers

Team	1	2	3	4	5	6	7	8	9	10	R	H	E
Washington	3	2	1	0	4	4	0	3	0	4	21	37	3
Los Angeles	4	1	0	0	2	8	3	2	2	0	22	38	2
Total attendance: 240,610 Average attendance: 48,122

== League Championship Series ==
=== Game 1, October 11 ===
8:08 p.m. (EDT) at Busch Stadium in St. Louis, Missouri

Making the franchise's first National League Championship Series appearance as the Washington Nationals and only its second NLCS appearance other than one by the Montreal Expos in 1981, the Nationals traveled to face the St. Louis Cardinals in Game 1. Daniel Hudson, who had emerged as a reliable late-inning reliever and closer for the Nationals, was on paternity leave in Phoenix, Arizona, for the birth of his daughter and missed the game; he was the first MLB player ever to go on paternity leave during the postseason, and the media wondered aloud about how his absence might affect Washington's often shaky bullpen. Starting center fielder Victor Robles, still nursing a hamstring injury he had suffered in Game 2 of the Division Series, missed his fourth straight game, and catcher Kurt Suzuki, who was recovering from being hit in the wrist and face by a pitch in Game 5 of the Division Series also was out of the lineup.

Washington's "Big Three" starters – Max Scherzer, Stephen Strasburg, and Patrick Corbin – had seen heavy use so far in the postseason, so Nationals manager Dave Martinez rested them and put No. 4 starter Aníbal Sánchez on the mound to face the Cardinals. It was the ninth postseason start of Sánchez's career, but he had pitched only five innings over the previous 15 days. A pitcher's duel ensued. Sánchez pitched a masterpiece, retiring the first ten batters he faced with his first 35 pitches, allowing no Cardinal to reach base for 4 2/3 innings, when he finally walked second baseman Kolten Wong with two outs in the fifth inning. Wong stole second and advanced to third on a throwing error by catcher Yan Gomes, but did not score. Sánchez threw 17 pitches in the first inning, but then only seven in the second inning, 10 in the third, 11 in the fourth, and 11 in the fifth.

Sánchez did not allow another base runner until the sixth inning, when he hit pinch hitter Randy Arozarena with a pitch; Another St. Louis scoring threat developed that inning when Arozarena advanced to third on a groundout by center fielder Dexter Fowler, but Arozarena was stranded at third base. The Cardinals did not reach base again until Sánchez hit catcher Yadier Molina with a pitch in the seventh inning. Sánchez pitched a no-hitter for 7 2/3 innings, helped by a spectacular diving grab first baseman Ryan Zimmerman made that robbed right fielder Tommy Edman of a hit on a hard liner to lead off the eighth inning. When pinch hitter José Martínez finally broke up the no-hit bid with a single with two outs in the eighth on Sánchez's 103rd pitch, Dave Martinez took Sánchez out of the game, and as he headed for the dugout, Sánchez made the sportsmanlike gesture of congratulating José Martínez as he stood at first base by pointing to him and clapping his hands. The St. Louis crowd recognized Sánchez's achievement with a courteous ovation as he left the field. In Sánchez's 103-pitch outing, he had given up one hit and one walk, thrown 67 strikes, and struck out five Cardinals. He left the game having allowed just one run in the 12 2/3 innings he had pitched in the 2019 postseason. He became the first pitcher in MLB history to start two postseason games with six hitless innings, his previous hitless six-inning postseason start having come with the Detroit Tigers against the New York Yankees in Game 1 of the 2013 American League Championship Series.

Although they never got a big hit to break the game open and left 13 runners on base, the Nationals′ offense put far more pressure on the Cardinals′ pitchers. After second baseman Howie Kendrick doubled off St. Louis starter Miles Mikolas to lead off the second inning, catcher Yan Gomes doubled with two outs to drive in Kendrick and give Washington a 1–0 lead. Their next scoring threat against Mikolas came in the fifth inning, when Gomes led off with a single, shortstop Trea Turner singled with one out and Gomes advanced to second, and third baseman Anthony Rendon drew a two-out walk to load the bases, but Mikolas got left fielder Juan Soto to ground out to end the inning, grabbing his crotch briefly in Soto's direction before walking off the field – a move apparently made in response to Soto's elaborate between-pitches "Soto Shuffle" routine while batting, which included Soto adjusting his jockstrap and had drawn boos from the crowd. In the sixth inning, Zimmerman doubled with one out, and the Cardinals intentionally walked Gomes with two outs, but the inning ended when Sánchez struck out. Mikolas left the game after the sixth, having allowed one run on seven hits and a walk, striking out seven and throwing 98 pitches.

The Nationals added to their lead in the seventh inning. Right fielder Adam Eaton hit a one-out triple off reliever Giovanny Gallegos, and the Cardinals intentionally walked Rendon. Andrew Miller relieved Gallegos and struck out Soto. John Brebbia then came into the game to face Kendrick, who singled on Brebbia's second pitch, scoring Eaton to give the Nationals a 2–0 lead and advancing Rendon to second. Zimmerman then walked to load the bases, but center fielder Michael A. Taylor flied out to end the inning. The Nationals threatened again in the ninth, when Soto singled off Tyler Webb with two outs and advanced to second on a wild pitch by closer Carlos Martínez. St. Louis then intentionally walked Kendrick, but Martínez struck out Zimmerman to end the inning.

Meanwhile, Sean Doolittle entered the game in the eighth inning in relief of Sánchez and pitched 1 1/3 perfect innings for his first postseason save since 2017, striking out left fielder Marcell Ozuna with his last pitch. Sánchez got his first postseason win since his six-inning, no-hit outing for the Tigers in Game 1 of the 2013 ALCS, and the Nationals won 2–0 and took a 1–0 series lead.

Friday, October 11, 2019 8:08 pm EDT at Busch Stadium in St. Louis, Missouri
Team	1	2	3	4	5	6	7	8	9	R	H	E
Washington	0	1	0	0	0	0	1	0	0	2	10	1
St. Louis	0	0	0	0	0	0	0	0	0	0	1	0
Starting pitchers: WAS: Aníbal Sánchez (0–0); STL: Miles Mikolas (0–0); WP: Aníbal Sánchez (1–0) LP: Miles Mikolas (0–1) Sv: Sean Doolittle (1); Home runs: WAS: none STL: none Attendance: 45,075

=== Game 2, October 12 ===
4:08 p.m. (EDT) at Busch Stadium in St. Louis, Missouri

Game 2 featured a match-up of two veteran starters, Washington's Max Scherzer and St. Louis's Adam Wainwright. With two ace pitchers on the mound and late-afternoon shadows on the field making it hard for batters to see the ball, another pitcher's duel ensued. Scherzer walked second baseman Kolten Wong in the first inning and center fielder Dexter Fowler in the sixth, but otherwise allowed no base runners and carried a no-hitter through six innings. Wong stole second after walking in the first inning, but he was the only Cardinal to reach scoring position while Scherzer was on the mound. First baseman Paul Goldschmidt finally broke up Scherzer's no-hit bid with a single to lead off the seventh inning on a liner into left field that left fielder Juan Soto played conservatively so that the ball would not get past him and allow Goldschmidt to reach scoring position in a one-run game. Goldschmidt got no farther than first base, as Scherzer completed his outing by striking out left fielder Marcell Ozuna and getting catcher Yadier Molina to ground into an inning-ending double play. Scherzer left the game after seven innings of work having allowed three base runners on one hit and two walks while striking out 11 Cardinals; he threw 101 pitches, 65 of them for strikes. The outing gave him an MLB-record five postseason no-hit bids of at least five innings. Playing for the Detroit Tigers in 2013, he and Aníbal Sánchez had become the first teammates since postseason play began in 1903 to have back-to-back postseason no-hit bids of at least five innings, when they did it during Games 1 and 2 of the 2013 American League Championship Series; with Sánchez pitching 7 2/3 innings of no-hit ball for Washington in Game 1 of the 2019 NLCS the previous evening, they became only the second teammates with back-to-back five-inning no-hit bids in the postseason, and the first to carry postseason no-hit bids through at least six innings in consecutive games.

Wainwright gave up a single to third baseman Anthony Rendon in the first inning, but Rendon was the Nationals′ only base runner until the third inning, when center fielder Michael A. Taylor, again starting in place of the injured Victor Robles, led off by hitting Wainwright's first pitch into the left field stands to give Washington a 1–0 lead. Wainwright cruised through the remainder of the third inning and all the way through the next four innings as well, allowing only a single by Taylor in the fifth inning and a single by shortstop Trea Turner in the sixth.

The score was still 1–0 when Wainwright finally ran into trouble in the eighth inning. He struck out Taylor to begin the inning, but Matt Adams, pinch-hitting for Scherzer, hit a deep one-out single, then advanced to second on a Trea Turner single. On a full count, right fielder Adam Eaton then hit a double down the right field line that scored Adams and Turner to give the Nationals a 3–0 lead. After St. Louis intentionally walked Rendon, Wainwright left the game after throwing 99 pitches, 73 of them for strikes, over 7 1/3 innings, allowing seven hits and a walk while striking out 11 Nats. Andrew Miller relieved him and got two outs to end the inning.

Sean Doolittle pitched the bottom of the eighth inning for Washington and gave up a two-out single to shortstop Paul DeJong, followed by a liner into center field by pinch hitter José Martínez. Michael A. Taylor misplayed the ball in center field, letting it get over his head, and DeJong came home to score the Cardinals′ first run of the NLCS, making the score 3–1, while Martínez ended up at second base with a double. Doolittle avoided further damage when center fielder Dexter Fowler flied out on his next pitch to end the inning.

Ryan Helsley pitched a perfect top of the ninth for St. Louis, and in the bottom of the ninth Patrick Corbin came in to pitch for Washington and got Kolten Wong to ground out on two pitches. Daniel Hudson, who had returned to the team only seven hours earlier after missing Game 1 to be present for the birth of his daughter in Phoenix, Arizona, got the final two outs and his third save of the 2019 postseason to secure a 3–1 Washington victory. In the first two games of the series, the Nationals had limited the Cardinals to just four hits – a double that resulted from a misplayed ball and three singles – and had allowed St. Louis to score only one run. The Nationals jumped out to a 2–0 lead in the series, having gone 80–40 in the 120 games they had played since bottoming out at 19–31 on May 23 and having outscored their opponents by 188 runs over that 120-game stretch. The 2019 NLCS moved to Nationals Park for its next game two days later.

Saturday, October 12, 2019 4:08 pm EDT at Busch Stadium in St. Louis, Missouri
Team	1	2	3	4	5	6	7	8	9	R	H	E
Washington	0	0	1	0	0	0	0	2	0	3	7	0
St. Louis	0	0	0	0	0	0	0	1	0	1	3	0
Starting pitchers: WAS: Max Scherzer (0–0); STL: Adam Wainwright (0–0); WP: Max Scherzer (1–0) LP: Adam Wainwright (0–1) Sv: Daniel Hudson (1); Home runs: WAS: Michael A. Taylor; STL: none Attendance: 46,458

=== Game 3, October 14 ===
7:38 p.m. (EDT) at Nationals Park in Washington, D.C.

Game 3 – the first League Championship Series game ever held in Washington, D.C. – again featured a contest between two ace pitchers, with Jack Flaherty taking the ball for St. Louis and Stephen Strasburg on the mound for Washington. Many observers anticipated another pitcher's duel: Flaherty had posted an MLB-best 0.91 ERA in the 16 regular-season starts had made since the 2019 all-star break, and including the two postseason games he had started, his ERA stood at 1.13 and his opponents′ batting average at .151 over his past 18 starts. Strasburg had a career ERA of 1.32 in 34 postseason games.

After sports entertainment announcer Michael Buffer, serving as the pregame guest announcer, gave his trademark cry "Let’s get ready to rumble!”, Strasburg took the mound. He gave up a leadoff double to left fielder Marcell Ozuna in the second inning, but grabbed a grounder by the next batter he faced, right fielder José Martínez, charged toward Ozuna – who was caught between second and third base – and tagged him out to erase the scoring threat. He faced another threat in the fourth inning, when Ozuna and Martínez hit back-to-back two-out singles, but he got out of the inning on a fly out by catcher Yadier Molina. He finally gave up a run in his final inning of work when Martínez and Molina led off with consecutive singles and shortstop Paul DeJong singled with one out, allowing Martínez to score on a throwing error by left fielder Juan Soto that occurred when Soto slipped while attempting to throw the ball into the infield. Strasburg then completed his outing with two consecutive strikeouts. He left the game having thrown 117 pitches – the most he had thrown in a single game since a 118-pitch outing in May 2017 – 84 of them for strikes, giving up seven hits, walking no one, and striking out 12 Cardinals. The crowd gave him a standing ovation as he walked to the dugout.

The Nationals had a big lead by the time Strasburg left the game. Flaherty allowed only a walk in his first two innings of work, but the Nationals′ offense struck in the third inning. After center fielder Victor Robles – making his first appearance since injuring his hamstring in Game 2 of the division series – led off with a single and advanced to second on a Strasburg sacrifice bunt, right fielder Adam Eaton hit a two-out single that drove in Robles. Third baseman Anthony Rendon followed with a double that scored Eaton all the way from first base. After Soto walked, second baseman Howie Kendrick doubled, scoring Rendon and Soto, and the third inning ended with Washington ahead 4–0. Flaherty left the game after the fourth inning, giving up five hits and two walks on 78 pitches, striking out six. The four runs he allowed were the most since July 2.

Washington added to its lead in the fifth inning. Facing St. Louis reliever Tyler Webb, Rendon singled with one out. With two outs, John Brebbia relieved Webb and faced Kendrick, who doubled again, driving in Rendon. First baseman Ryan Zimmerman followed immediately with another double that scored Kendrick, and Washington led 6–0. In the bottom of the sixth inning, Robles led off with a homer off Brebbia that extended the lead to 7–0. With the score at 7–1 in the top of the seventh inning, Kendrick hit a two-out double off reliever Daniel Ponce de Leon, and Zimmerman followed with a single that scored Kendrick, giving the Nationals an 8–1 lead. By the time the inning was over, Kendrick had driven in eight runs in four games. During Game 3, he also became only the fourth player to hit three doubles in a League Championship Series game.

Ponce de Leon allowed only one more base runner when he walked shortstop Trea Turner in the eighth inning, but Fernando Rodney and Tanner Rainey pitched perfect eighth and ninth innings, respectively, and Washington came away with an 8–1 victory. The Nationals had scored seven of their runs with two outs. Strasburg got the win, and his evening ended with him having gone 3–0 in the 2019 postseason with a 1.64 ERA, 33 strikeouts, and one walk in 22 innings of work; his win total for the regular season and postseason combined reached 21. Washington's starting pitchers had limited St. Louis to two runs and 11 hits and posted an ERA of 0.00 during the first three games of the series, giving up three walks and striking out 28 Cardinals in 21 2/3 innings pitched. Winners of 15 of their last 17 games, the Nationals took a 3–0 lead in the series and had a chance to clinch a berth in the 2019 World Series the following evening.

Monday, October 14, 2019 7:38 p.m. EDT at Nationals Park in Washington, D.C.
Team	1	2	3	4	5	6	7	8	9	R	H	E
St. Louis	0	0	0	0	0	0	1	0	0	1	7	0
Washington	0	0	4	0	2	1	1	0	0	8	11	1
Starting pitchers: STL: Jack Flaherty (0–0); WAS: Stephen Strasburg (0–0); WP: Stephen Strasburg (1–0) LP: Jack Flaherty (0–1) Sv: none Home runs: STL: none WAS: Victor Robles; Attendance: 43,675

=== Game 4, October 15 ===
8:08 p.m. (EDT) at Nationals Park in Washington, D.C.

After Washington Mystics small forward Elena Delle Donne threw the ceremonial first pitch in honor of the Mystics′ first Women's National Basketball Association championship, which the Mystics had won five days earlier, Game 4 got underway with Patrick Corbin on the mound for Washington and Dakota Hudson starting for St. Louis. The first inning decided the outcome. After Corbin struck out the side in the top of the inning, Hudson ran into trouble immediately in the bottom of the first. Shortstop Trea Turner led off with a single, then advanced to third when right fielder Adam Eaton doubled. After third baseman Anthony Rendon drove in Turner with a sacrifice fly, left fielder Juan Soto doubled to score Eaton. The Cardinals then intentionally walked second baseman Howie Kendrick. In the next at-bat, first baseman Ryan Zimmerman hit a grounder to Cardinals third baseman Tommy Edman, but second baseman Kolten Wong dropped Edman's throw to second, resulting in all the runners advancing safely and center fielder Victor Robles coming to bat with the bases loaded. Robles singled on a ball to right field that fell into the grass between Wong, first baseman Paul Goldschmidt, and right fielder José Martínez when they failed to communicate about who would make the catch; Soto scored on the play, and the other runners moved up. Catcher Yan Gomes then hit a bases-loaded single that scored Kendrick and Zimmerman and advanced Robles to second. With the Nationals holding a 5–0 lead, St. Louis manager Mike Shildt took Hudson – who had thrown only 15 pitches – out of the game and brought in starter Adam Wainwright in relief. After Corbin advanced Robles and Gomes to third and second, respectively, with a sacrifice bunt, Wainwright gave up a single to Turner that scored both Robles and Gomes before Eaton lined out to end the inning. Sending 11 men to the plate, the Nationals had jumped out to a 7–0 lead without hitting a ball any farther than 275 feet (84 m) in the air, and Dakota Hudson was charged with all seven runs, four of them earned, on five hits and a walk in only a third of an inning of work.

After St. Louis's disastrous first inning, the Cardinals′ pitching staff pitched effectively. Wainwright allowed no base runners in the second inning, and Ryan Helsley gave up only a walk while pitching the third and fourth innings. Meanwhile, facing a long climb back to avoid elimination, the Cardinals′ offense began to put pressure on Corbin, reaching base for the first time in the third inning when Wong singled and Edman walked, although they did not score. In the fourth, Cardinals catcher Yadier Molina hit a 408-foot (124 m) homer over the center field wall to make the score 7–1. St. Louis hitters had their best inning of the entire series in the fifth, when Corbin walked center fielder Harrison Bader, gave up a single to Wong, and walked pinch hitter Dexter Fowler to load the bases with no outs. Edman then grounded out, but in the process drove in Bader to make the score 7–2 and advanced Wong and Fowler. With one out, Martínez doubled, scoring both Wong and Fowler, and the Cardinals closed to 7–4. Corbin then completed his outing by extinguishing the St. Louis rally with consecutive strikeouts. He left the game after the inning after throwing 94 pitches, giving up four runs on four hits and three walks but striking out 12. He became the first pitcher in MLB history to strike out 10 batters in the first four innings of a postseason game.

Both bullpens pitched the next two innings without much trouble. In the sixth and seventh, St. Louis reliever Giovanny Gallegos pitched one-hit shutout ball, while Tanner Rainey pitched a perfect sixth inning for Washington and Sean Doolittle followed with a perfect seventh. In the eighth inning, Doolittle came back out and retired the first two batters he faced before giving up a two-out single to left fielder Marcell Ozuna. Daniel Hudson relieved Doolittle and a St. Louis scoring threat developed when he hit Molina with a pitch and walked shortstop Paul DeJong to load the bases before he got pinch hitter Matt Carpenter – a career .481 hitter with the bases loaded – to ground out to end the inning.

After Cardinals reliever Andrew Miller retired all three Nationals he faced in the bottom of the eighth inning, Daniel Hudson returned to the mound to pitch a perfect ninth. On the 94th birthday of Ted Lerner, who had served as managing principal owner of the Nationals from 2006 to 2018, the Nationals won 7–4 to sweep the 2019 NLCS and win the first National League pennant in the history of both the Montreal-Washington franchise and Washington, D.C., as well as Washington, D.C.′s first MLB league championship of any kind since the original Washington Senators won the American League pennant in 1933. The Nationals advanced to the World Series for the first time in Montreal-Washington franchise history, and a Washington, D.C., MLB team earned a World Series berth for the first time since the original Senators reached the Series in 1933. Outscoring the Cardinals 20–6 in the NLCS, the 2019 Nationals became only the fourth team in MLB history to reach the World Series after falling to 12 games below .500 during the regular season. Since hitting that low point with a record of 19–31 on May 23, they had posted the best record in MLB – 82–40, a .672 winning percentage – through the final game of the NLCS.

With fans chanting "Howie! Howie!" from the stands and his teammates giving him a standing ovation, Howie Kendrick received the 2019 National League Championship Series Most Valuable Player Award after the game. In Game 3, he had gone 3-for-4 with three RBIs and had become only the fourth player to hit three doubles in a League Championship Series game. For the series as a whole, he went 5-for-15 (.333) at the plate with four doubles and four RBIs, and he scored four runs.

Tuesday, October 15, 2019 8:08 p.m. EDT at Nationals Park in Washington, D.C.
Team	1	2	3	4	5	6	7	8	9	R	H	E
St. Louis	0	0	0	1	3	0	0	0	0	4	5	1
Washington	7	0	0	0	0	0	0	0	X	7	9	0
Starting pitchers: STL: Dakota Hudson (0–0); WAS: Patrick Corbin (0–0); WP: Patrick Corbin (1–0) LP: Dakota Hudson (0–1) Sv: Daniel Hudson (2); Home runs: STL: Yadier Molina; WAS: none Attendance: 43,976

=== Composite line score ===
2019 NLCS (4–0): Washington Nationals defeated St. Louis Cardinals

Team	1	2	3	4	5	6	7	8	9	R	H	E
Washington	7	1	5	0	2	1	2	2	0	20	37	2
St. Louis	0	0	0	1	3	0	1	1	0	6	16	1
Total attendance: 179,184 Average attendance: 44,796

== World Series ==
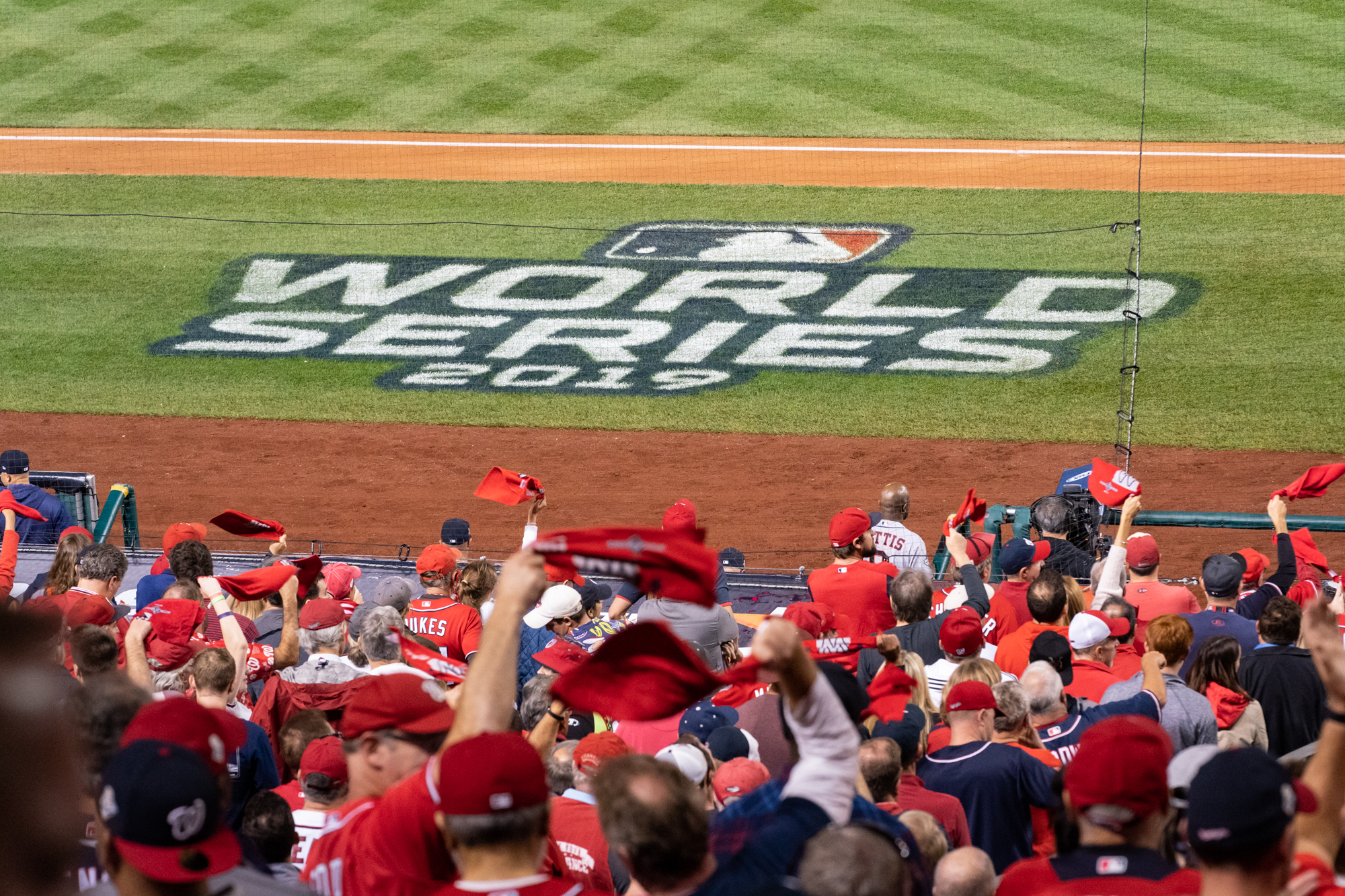
Fans cheer for the Nationals during MLB World Series at Nationals Park in Washington, D.C.

=== Game 1, October 22 ===
8:08 p.m. (EDT) at Minute Maid Park in Houston, Texas

While a watch party took place on a wet night at Nationals Park in Washington, Game 1 was played at Minute Maid Park in Houston as the Nationals faced the heavily favored Houston Astros in the first World Series game in Montreal-Washington franchise history and the first World Series game in Washington, D.C., baseball history since the Washington Senators played the final game of the 1933 World Series on October 7, 1933. Gerrit Cole – who had not lost a game since May 22, winning 19 games over 25 starts since then, leading the major leagues in strikeouts in 2019 – started for Houston and on his second pitch gave up a leadoff single to shortstop Trea Turner, who then stole second base – Washington's first stolen-base attempt of the 2019 postseason – but was stranded there.

Max Scherzer started for the Nationals and walked the Astros′ leadoff hitter, center fielder George Springer, followed by a single to second baseman Jose Altuve and two-out, bases-clearing double to first baseman Yuli Gurriel that gave Houston a 2–0 lead after one inning. With a rapidly mounting pitch count and Houston's offense keeping up pressure on Nats pitchers all evening, he continued to labor, but got out of a bases-loaded jam in the third inning and an Astros scoring threat with runners on first and second in the fourth inning. He finished his outing with a perfect fifth inning that concluded with a strikeout. He left the game after throwing 112 pitches, 65 of them for strikes, and giving up five hits and three walks, striking out seven.

The Nationals began a comeback in the second inning on a two-out, 413-foot (126 m) solo homer by first baseman Ryan Zimmerman, the first World Series home run in both Nationals and franchise history. In the fourth inning, left fielder Juan Soto tied the game at 2–2 on a leadoff 417-foot (127 m) homer that landed on the retractable roof's track system in center field, becoming the fourth-youngest player ever to homer in a World Series. (Note: The only players younger than Juan Soto to hit a home run in the World Series were Andruw Jones, Miguel Cabrera, and Mickey Mantle. (See Anonymous, "Soto, Nationals top Cole, Astros 5–4 in World Series opener," Associated Press, October 23, 2019, 12:09 a.m.)) The Nationals broke the tie in the fifth inning, when catcher Kurt Suzuki led off with a walk, center fielder Victor Robles singled, advancing Suzuki to second, and Suzuki tagged and advanced to third on a Turner line out. Right fielder Adam Eaton then singled, driving in Suzuki to give the Nationals a 3–2 lead and advancing Robles to second. After third baseman Anthony Rendon grounded into a fielder's choice that advanced Robles to third, Soto hit a two-out double that scored both Robles and Rendon and stretched Washington's lead to 5–2. Houston shortstop Carlos Correa finally brought the inning to an end by robbing designated hitter Howie Kendrick of a single on a hard liner. Patrick Corbin pitched a one-hit top of the sixth inning for Washington, and Cole pitched through the top of the seventh, leaving the game with 104 pitches, 70 for strikes, with six strikeouts and a walk and having allowed eight hits.

The Astros made a comeback bid of their own beginning in the seventh inning, when Tanner Rainey came in to pitch for the Nationals. Rainey gave up a leadoff 428-foot (130 m) homer to Springer – Springer setting a new record by hitting a homer in five straight World Series games – followed by two one-out walks. Daniel Hudson relieved him and, although Houston loaded the bases, got out of the inning without further damage and Washington holding a 5–3 lead. The Astros threatened to tie the game in the eighth inning, when pinch hitter Kyle Tucker led off with a single, tagged and advanced to second on a fly out, and scored on a one-out Springer double that narrowly missed going over the fence to reduce Washington's lead to one run. After Altuve flied out, however, Sean Doolittle relieved Hudson and closed the game with a perfect final 1 1/3 innings. The Nationals won 5–4 – their 17th win in 19 games dating back into the regular season – to stretch their postseason winning streak to seven games and take a 1–0 lead in the World Series.

Tuesday, October 22, 2019 8:08 pm EDT at Minute Maid Park in Houston, Texas
Team	1	2	3	4	5	6	7	8	9	R	H	E
Washington	0	1	0	1	3	0	0	0	0	5	9	0
Houston	2	0	0	0	0	0	1	1	0	4	10	0
Starting pitchers: WAS: Max Scherzer (0–0); HOU: Gerrit Cole (0–0); WP: Max Scherzer (1–0) LP: Gerrit Cole (0–1) Sv: Sean Doolittle (1); Home runs: WAS: Ryan Zimmerman, Juan Soto; HOU: George Springer; Attendance: 43,339

=== Game 2, October 23 ===
8:07 p.m. (EDT) at Minute Maid Park in Houston, Texas

Game 2 saw another meeting of two dominating pitchers, with Justin Verlander on the mound for Houston and Stephen Strasburg for Washington. Each of them allowed two runs in the first inning. After Verlander walked Washington's leadoff hitter, shortstop Trea Turner, on four pitches and gave up a single to right fielder Adam Eaton, third baseman Anthony Rendon doubled to score both of them and give the Nationals a 2–0 lead before Verlander recorded his first out. In the bottom of the inning, Strasburg gave up a one-out double to second baseman Jose Altuve, but that scoring threat dissipated when catcher Kurt Suzuki cut Altuve down as he tried to steal third. With two outs, however, left fielder Michael Brantley singled and third baseman Alex Bregman hit a 411-foot (125 m) homer to left that tied the game at 2–2.

The game remained tied through the end of the sixth inning. In the second inning, Verlander struck out center fielder Victor Robles for his 200th career postseason strikeout, a new MLB record. (Note: The previous MLB record for career postseason strikeouts was 199 by John Smoltz, who was the television analyst for the game. (See Anonymous, "Strasburg stars as Nats rout Astros 12–3 for 2–0 Series lead," Associated Press, October 24, 2019, 12:31 a.m. Retrieved October 24, 2019)) He scattered four hits and a walk, the Nationals posing a scoring threat only when left fielder Juan Soto doubled with two outs in the third inning. The Astros′ lineup put more pressure on Strasburg. In the third inning, Altuve reached first on a two-out Turner throwing error and advanced to third when Brantley singled, but neither of them scored. In the fourth inning, designated hitter Yordan Alvarez singled with one out and reached second on a groundout, but was stranded there. In the sixth inning, first baseman Yuli Gurriel hit a one-out double and the Nationals intentionally walked the hot-hitting Alvarez, but Strasburg got out of the inning on a pop out and a strikeout. It completed his outing, and he exited the game after giving up seven hits and a walk and striking out seven Astros on 114 pitches, 77 of them for strikes.

The Nationals finally broke the tie in the seventh inning, when Suzuki led off and homered to left – the first postseason home run of his career – on Verlander's second pitch of the inning and 100th of the game to give Washington a 3–2 lead. Verlander then walked Robles, and Astros manager A. J. Hinch took him out of the game after he had thrown 107 pitches, 69 for strikes, giving up four hits and three walks and striking out six Nats; he left the field with an MLB-record 202 career postseason strikeouts. Ryan Pressly came in to pitch and walked Turner, after which Eaton advanced Robles to third and Turner to second with a sacrifice bunt. After Rendon flied out, Houston intentionally walked Soto – the first intentional walk Houston had issued all season – to load the bases and bring designated hitter Howie Kendrick to the plate. Kendrick beat out an infield single which scored Robles, extending the Nationals′ lead to 4–2. Second baseman Asdrúbal Cabrera singled, scoring Turner and Soto, making the lead 6–2. After Kendrick and Cabrera advanced to third and second, respectively, on a Pressly wild pitch, first baseman Ryan Zimmerman reached first on an infield single and advanced to second on a throwing error by Bregman, Kendrick and Cabrera scoring on the play to make the score 8–2. Many Astros fans headed for the exits at Minute Maid Park.

After Fernando Rodney pitched a scoreless bottom of the seventh, the Nationals returned to the plate in the eighth. Robles led off and struck out but reached first base on a passed ball. Eaton hit a one-out homer, scoring Robles and extending the lead to 10–2. With two outs, Soto walked, Kendrick singled, and Cabrera singled, scoring Soto to make the score 11–2. Tanner Rainey pitched a perfect bottom of the eighth, and Washington scored a final run when Michael A. Taylor, who had replaced Robles in center field, hit the first pitch he saw over the left field wall, a one-out homer that gave Washington a 12–2 lead.

In the bottom of the ninth, Houston catcher Martín Maldonado hit a one-out, 409-foot (125 m) homer off reliever Javy Guerra to make the score 12–3. Two more Astros reached base in the ninth before Guerra induced a game-ending groundout. Strasburg was credited with the win, making him 4–0 in the 2019 postseason, while Verlander's career World Series record fell to 0–5. Winners of eight games in a row and 18 of their last 20, the Nationals won to take a 2–0 lead in the World Series with the next game scheduled for two nights later at Nationals Park.

Wednesday, October 23, 2019 8:07 pm EDT at Minute Maid Park in Houston, Texas
Team	1	2	3	4	5	6	7	8	9	R	H	E
Washington	2	0	0	0	0	0	6	3	1	12	14	2
Houston	2	0	0	0	0	0	0	0	1	3	9	1
Starting pitchers: WAS: Stephen Strasburg (0–0); HOU: Justin Verlander (0–0); WP: Stephen Strasburg (1–0) LP: Justin Verlander (0–1) Sv: none Home runs: WAS: Kurt Suzuki, Adam Eaton, Michael A. Taylor; HOU: Alex Bregman, Martín Maldonado; Attendance: 43,357

=== Game 3, October 25 ===
8:07 p.m. (EDT) at Nationals Park in Washington, D.C.

Game 3 was played at Nationals Park against the Houston Astros. It was the first World Series game ever played at Nationals Park, and the first World Series game played in Washington, D.C., since October 7, 1933. The Astros won the game, with six pitchers combining to limit the Nationals to just one run.

Friday, October 25, 2019 8:07 pm EDT at Nationals Park in Washington, D.C.
Team	1	2	3	4	5	6	7	8	9	R	H	E
Houston	0	1	1	0	1	1	0	0	0	4	11	0
Washington	0	0	0	1	0	0	0	0	0	1	9	2
Starting pitchers: HOU: Zack Greinke (0–0); WAS: Aníbal Sánchez (0–0); WP: Josh James (1–0) LP: Aníbal Sánchez (0–1) Sv: Roberto Osuna (1); Home runs: HOU: Robinson Chirinos (1); WAS: None; Attendance: 43,867

=== Game 4, October 26 ===
8:07 p.m. (EDT) at Nationals Park in Washington, D.C.

The Houston Astros won their second straight game to even the series, with rookie José Urquidy outdueling Nationals left-hander Patrick Corbin for the win. Alex Bregman hit a grand slam in the seventh inning off veteran reliever Fernando Rodney.

Saturday, October 26, 2019 8:07 pm EDT at Nationals Park in Washington, D.C.
Team	1	2	3	4	5	6	7	8	9	R	H	E
Houston	2	0	0	2	0	0	4	0	0	8	13	1
Washington	0	0	0	0	0	1	0	0	0	1	4	0
Starting pitchers: HOU: José Urquidy (0–0); WAS: Patrick Corbin (0–0); WP: José Urquidy (1–0) LP: Patrick Corbin (0–1) Sv: none Home runs: HOU: Robinson Chirinos (2), Alex Bregman (2); WAS: None; Attendance: 43,889

=== Game 5, October 27 ===
8:07 p.m. (EDT) at Nationals Park in Washington, D.C.

The Houston Astros defeated the Nationals to take a 3–2 lead in the World Series.

October 27, 2019 8:07 pm (EDT) at Nationals Park in Washington, D.C., 72 °F (22 °C), clear
Team	1	2	3	4	5	6	7	8	9	R	H	E
Houston	0	2	0	2	0	0	0	1	2	7	10	0
Washington	0	0	0	0	0	0	1	0	0	1	4	0
WP: Gerrit Cole (1–1) LP: Joe Ross (0–1) Sv: none Home runs: HOU: Yordan Alvarez (1), Carlos Correa (1), George Springer (2); WSH: Juan Soto (2); Attendance: 43,910

=== Game 6, October 29 ===
8:07 p.m. (EDT) at Minute Maid Park in Houston, Texas

With a chance to clinch victory in the World Series, the Houston Astros were instead overmatched by Nationals starter Stephen Strasburg, who outdueled Justin Verlander behind key home runs from Adam Eaton, Anthony Rendon, and Juan Soto to even the series. Verlander gave up a first-inning run on an RBI single by Rendon. Despite falling behind in the bottom of the first, after a Jose Altuve sacrifice fly that tied the game was followed by a home run by Alex Bregman, who carried his bat past first base after admiring the blast into the Crawford Boxes in left field, the Nationals rallied to take the lead back in the fifth inning. They tied it on a solo home run by Eaton. A batter later, Soto homered deep to right field, then mimicked Bregman by carrying his bat nearly all the way to first base before dropping it. In the seventh inning, Trea Turner was controversially called out for interference as home plate umpire Sam Holbrook ruled that he prevented first baseman Yuli Gurriel from cleanly catching a throw from Brad Peacock. Manager Dave Martinez attempted to play the rest of the game under protest, but after conferring with the replay center, the umpires disallowed the protest. Martinez was subsequently ejected for continuing to argue. Although the call forced baserunner Yan Gomes to return to first base, Rendon picked up Turner by smashing a two-run home run to left field off reliever Will Harris, giving the Nationals a three-run lead. Rendon doubled in two more in the ninth inning, giving the Nationals their 7–2 victory.

It was the fourth elimination game in the 2019 postseason that the Nationals won despite trailing at one point in the game, the first time in major league playoff history that had happened.

October 29, 2019 7:07 pm (CDT) at Minute Maid Park in Houston, Texas, 73 °F (23 °C), roof closed
Team	1	2	3	4	5	6	7	8	9	R	H	E
Washington	1	0	0	0	2	0	2	0	2	7	9	0
Houston	2	0	0	0	0	0	0	0	0	2	6	0
Starting pitchers: WSH: Stephen Strasburg (1–0); HOU: Justin Verlander (0–1); WP: Stephen Strasburg (2–0) LP: Justin Verlander (0–2) Sv: none Home runs: WSH: Adam Eaton (2), Juan Soto (3), Anthony Rendon (1); HOU: Alex Bregman (3); Attendance: 43,384

=== Game 7, October 30 ===
8:07 p.m. (EDT) at Minute Maid Park in Houston, Texas

Having gone the distance in the World Series, the Nationals and the Houston Astros met for the deciding game in front of an Astros home crowd. Houston starter Zack Greinke effectively shut down the Nationals for six innings, as meanwhile, a visibly laboring Max Scherzer grinded through a five-inning, two-run start, giving up a home run in the second inning to Yuli Gurriel and an RBI single to Carlos Correa in the fifth inning. However, Anthony Rendon cut the Astros' lead in half with a seventh-inning home run off Greinke, and after Juan Soto drew a walk, Astros manager A. J. Hinch took Greinke out of the game in favor of reliever Will Harris. Designated hitter Howie Kendrick greeted Harris by launching a 0–1 pitch down and away, lining it off the right field foul pole for a go-ahead, two-run home run. Kendrick's home run was later graded as one of the 10 "biggest hits" in MLB postseason history, swinging the Nationals from decided underdogs in the game to clear favorites. (Note: MLB.com ranked the foul pole shot by Kendrick as fifth by championship win probability adjusted over the previous 50 years, measuring it as changing the Nationals' odds in their favor by 35 percentage points. (See Petriello, Mike, "Kendrick’s HR among most clutch in history", MLB.com, October 31, 2019)) The Nationals held on behind three strong innings from Game 4 starter Patrick Corbin, who took over from Scherzer in relief. Soto and Adam Eaton padded the lead with RBI singles in the eighth and ninth innings, respectively, giving Washington closer Daniel Hudson a four-run lead to work with in the bottom of the ninth. Hudson retired the side in order, striking out Jose Altuve and Michael Brantley to seal the first World Series championship for Washington in 95 years and the first in the 51-year history of the Montreal Expos–Washington Nationals franchise.

With the win, the Nationals also achieved a number of other firsts. Stephen Strasburg became the first No. 1 overall draft pick to be named World Series MVP with the team that drafted him. Strasburg became the first pitcher to post a win–loss record of 5–0 in the postseason. The Nationals improved their record in 2019 postseason games started by Strasburg and Scherzer to 10–0, a record for a team behind two starting pitchers. The Nationals became the first team in World Series history to win all four games on the road. The Nationals also set a record for the worst record through the first 50 games of the season, 19–31, (Note: Rebounding from 12 games under .500 at any point in the season to win the championship was a feat only surpassed by the Boston Braves, who bottomed out at 14 games under .500 through their first 40 games, 12–28, before winning the 1914 World Series. (See Paine, Neil, "The Nationals Wouldn’t Say Die", FiveThirtyEight.com, October 31, 2019)) by a championship team. The Nationals accomplished something no other championship team had done by winning five elimination games despite trailing at one point in each of them. The Nationals furthermore became the first team in major league history to win the World Series by defeating two teams that had won 105 or more games, the 106-win Los Angeles Dodgers and the 107-win Houston Astros, during the regular season.

October 30, 2019 7:07 pm (CDT) at Minute Maid Park in Houston, Texas 73 °F (23 °C), roof closed
Team	1	2	3	4	5	6	7	8	9	R	H	E
Washington	0	0	0	0	0	0	3	1	2	6	9	0
Houston	0	1	0	0	1	0	0	0	0	2	9	1
Starting pitchers: WSH: Max Scherzer (1–0); HOU: Zack Greinke (0–0); WP: Patrick Corbin (1–1) LP: Will Harris (0–1); Home runs: WSH: Anthony Rendon (2), Howie Kendrick (1); HOU: Yuli Gurriel (1); Attendance: 43,326

== Postseason rosters ==
Playoff rosters
National League Wild Card Game

- Pitchers: 19 Aníbal Sánchez 21 Tanner Rainey 31 Max Scherzer 37 Stephen Strasburg 44 Daniel Hudson 46 Patrick Corbin 56 Fernando Rodney 60 Hunter Strickland 63 Sean Doolittle
- Catchers: 10 Yan Gomes 28 Kurt Suzuki 65 Raudy Read
- Infielders: 6 Anthony Rendon 7 Trea Turner 9 Brian Dozier 11 Ryan Zimmerman 13 Asdrúbal Cabrera 15 Matt Adams 47 Howie Kendrick
- Outfielders: 2 Adam Eaton 3 Michael A. Taylor 16 Víctor Robles 17 Andrew Stevenson 22 Juan Soto 88 Gerardo Parra

National League Division Series

- Pitchers: 19 Aníbal Sánchez 21 Tanner Rainey 31 Max Scherzer 37 Stephen Strasburg 44 Daniel Hudson 46 Patrick Corbin 50 Austin Voth 51 Wander Suero 56 Fernando Rodney 60 Hunter Strickland 63 Sean Doolittle
- Catchers: 10 Yan Gomes 28 Kurt Suzuki
- Infielders: 6 Anthony Rendon 7 Trea Turner 9 Brian Dozier 11 Ryan Zimmerman 13 Asdrúbal Cabrera 15 Matt Adams 47 Howie Kendrick
- Outfielders: 2 Adam Eaton 3 Michael A. Taylor 16 Víctor Robles 22 Juan Soto 88 Gerardo Parra

National League Championship Series

- Pitchers: 19 Aníbal Sánchez 21 Tanner Rainey 29 Roenis Elías 31 Max Scherzer 37 Stephen Strasburg 44 Daniel Hudson (Games 2–4) 46 Patrick Corbin 48 Javy Guerra 50 Austin Voth 51 Wander Suero (Game 1) 56 Fernando Rodney 63 Sean Doolittle
- Catchers: 10 Yan Gomes 28 Kurt Suzuki
- Infielders: 6 Anthony Rendon 7 Trea Turner 9 Brian Dozier 11 Ryan Zimmerman 13 Asdrúbal Cabrera 15 Matt Adams 47 Howie Kendrick
- Outfielders: 2 Adam Eaton 3 Michael A. Taylor 16 Víctor Robles 22 Juan Soto 88 Gerardo Parra

World Series

- Pitchers: 19 Aníbal Sánchez 21 Tanner Rainey 31 Max Scherzer 37 Stephen Strasburg 41 Joe Ross 44 Daniel Hudson 46 Patrick Corbin 48 Javy Guerra 51 Wander Suero 56 Fernando Rodney 63 Sean Doolittle
- Catchers: 10 Yan Gomes 28 Kurt Suzuki
- Infielders: 6 Anthony Rendon 7 Trea Turner 9 Brian Dozier 11 Ryan Zimmerman 13 Asdrúbal Cabrera 15 Matt Adams 47 Howie Kendrick
- Outfielders: 2 Adam Eaton 3 Michael A. Taylor 16 Víctor Robles 22 Juan Soto 88 Gerardo Parra
