= Tanner Rainey =

American baseball player (born 1992)

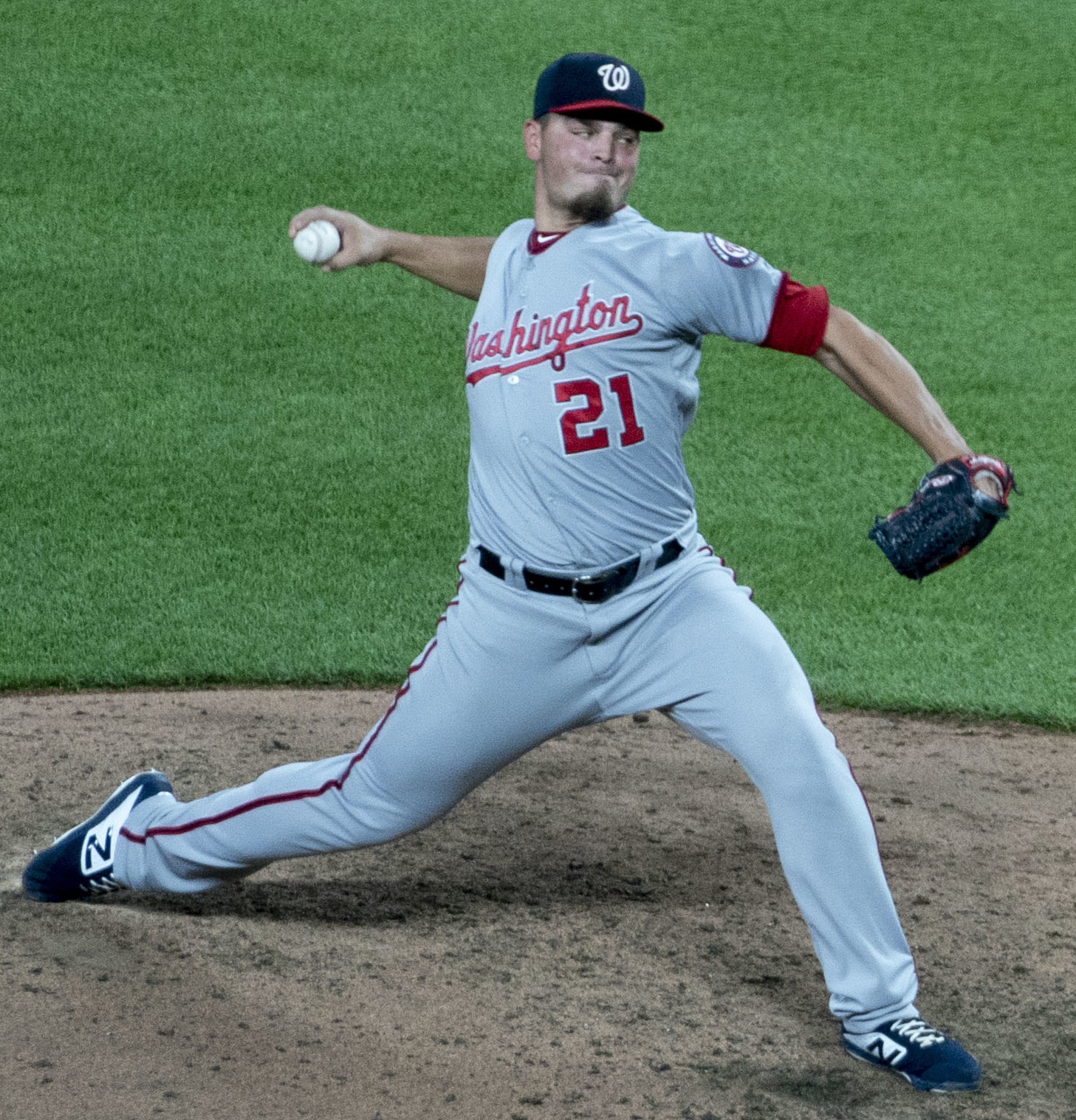
- Rainey with the Nationals in 2019

Free agent
- Pitcher
- Born: December 25, 1992 (age 33); Folsom, Louisiana, U.S.
- Bats: Right Throws: Right

MLB debut
- April 10, 2018, for the Cincinnati Reds

MLB statistics (through 2026 season)
- Win–loss record: 5–11
- Earned run average: 5.46
- Strikeouts: 253
- Stats at Baseball Reference

Teams
- Cincinnati Reds (2018); Washington Nationals (2019–2024); Pittsburgh Pirates (2025); Detroit Tigers (2025–2026)

Career highlights and awards
- World Series champion (2019)

Tanner Scott Rainey (born December 25, 1992) is an American professional baseball pitcher who is a free agent. He has previously played in Major League Baseball (MLB) for the Cincinnati Reds, Washington Nationals, Pittsburgh Pirates, and Detroit Tigers. He was drafted by the Reds in the second round of the 2015 MLB draft. He made his MLB debut with the Reds in 2018.

== Career ==
=== Amateur career ===
Rainey attended St. Paul's School in Covington, Louisiana. He played college baseball at Southeastern Louisiana University and the University of West Alabama as a pitcher and first baseman.

=== Cincinnati Reds ===
The Cincinnati Reds selected Rainey as a pitcher in the second round of the 2015 Major League Baseball draft. Rainey signed with the Reds, made his professional debut with the Billings Mustangs, and spent the whole season there, pitching to a 2–2 record and 4.27 ERA in 15 starts. He pitched 2016 with the Dayton Dragons and was 5–10 with a 5.57 ERA in 29 games (20 starts), and 2017 with the Daytona Tortugas and Pensacola Blue Wahoos, compiling a combined 3–3 record and 3.19 ERA in 53 relief appearances along with 104 strikeouts in 62 innings (15.1 per nine innings). The Reds invited him to spring training in 2018.

On April 10, 2018, Rainey's contract was purchased by the Reds. He made his major league debut that same day against the Philadelphia Phillies, pitching one inning of relief and giving up a grand slam to Scott Kingery. In the 2018 season with the Reds, he was 0–0 with a 24.23 ERA, as in seven innings over eight games he gave up 13 hits, 12 walks, and 19 earned runs.

=== Washington Nationals ===
On December 12, 2018, the Reds traded Rainey to the Washington Nationals for Tanner Roark. Rainey was called up to the Nationals from the Triple-A Fresno Grizzlies on May 18, 2019, and swiftly became one of manager Dave Martinez's go-to relievers. He earned his first career win in relief on June 1, beating Roark and the Reds at Great American Ball Park.

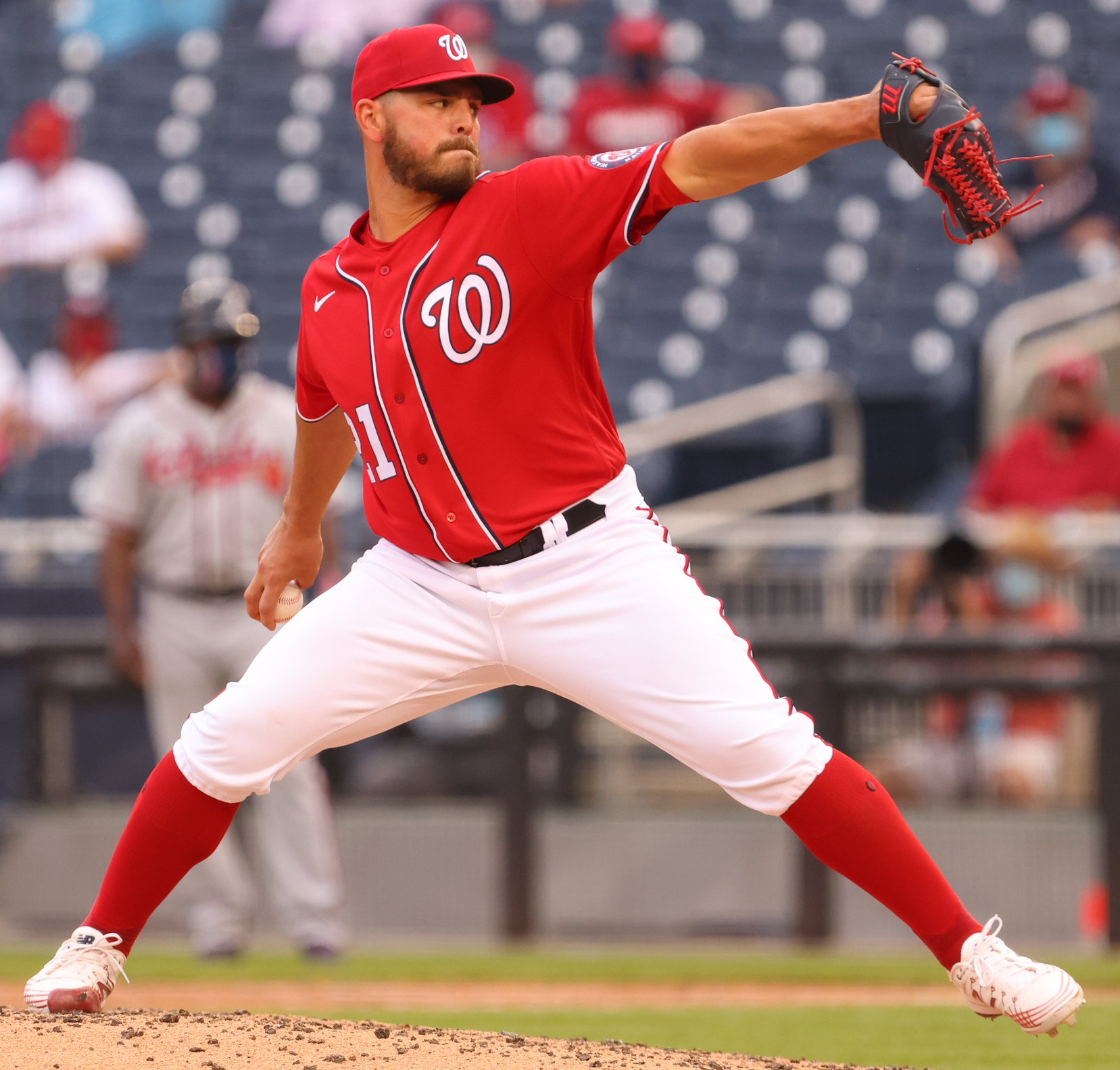
Rainey in 2020

In 2019, Rainey was 2–3 with a 3.91 ERA in 52 relief appearances, as he struck out 74 batters in 48 1/3 innings (13.8 per nine innings), but walked 38 batters (7.1 walks per 9 innings pitched). The Nationals finished the 2019 year with a 93–69 record, clinched a wild card spot, and won the World Series over the Houston Astros. Rainey pitched 6 2/3 innings with 5 walks and 6 strikeouts in the 2019 playoffs including throwing 2 strikeouts and finishing Game 3 of the 2019 NLCS, the first ever NLCS game at Nationals Park and in Washington, DC history. Rainey pitched 20 1/3 innings of 2.66 ERA ball in 2020, going along with 32 strikeouts and a 1–1 record, however after experiencing forearm tightness in mid-September 2020, Rainey sat out the remainder of the season. In 2021, Rainey made 38 appearances for the Nationals, and pitched to a 1–3 record and 7.39 ERA with 25 walks (averaging 7.1 walks per 9 innings) and 42 strikeouts in 31 2/3 innings pitched.

Rainey improved his numbers in 2022, pitching in 29 games and recording a 3.30 ERA with 12 saves and 36 strikeouts in 30 innings of work. On July 13, 2022, Rainey was abruptly placed on the 60-day injured list with a sprain of his ulnar collateral ligament in his right elbow. On August 3, he underwent Tommy John surgery, ending his season.

On September 29, 2023, Rainey was activated from the injured list to make his season debut and return from surgery. Rainey made 50 appearances for Washington in 2024, compiling a 4.76 ERA with 44 strikeouts across 51 innings pitched. On November 22, 2024, the Nationals non–tendered Rainey, making him a free agent.

=== Pittsburgh Pirates ===
On December 7, 2024, Rainey signed a minor league contract with the Pittsburgh Pirates. He was assigned to the Triple-A Indianapolis Indians to begin the 2025 season. On May 3, 2025, the Pirates selected Rainey's contract, adding him to their active roster. In 11 appearances for Pittsburgh, he struggled to an 0-1 record and 10.57 ERA with nine strikeouts across 7 2/3 innings pitched. On June 2, Rainey was designated for assignment by the Pirates. He cleared waivers and was sent outright to Triple-A Indianapolis, but rejected the assignment and elected free agency on June 4. On June 10, Rainey re-signed with Pittsburgh on a minor league contract. He was released by the Pirates organization on July 8.

=== Detroit Tigers ===
On July 18, 2025, Rainey signed a minor league contract with the Detroit Tigers. In 19 appearances for the Triple-A Toledo Mud Hens, he posted a 1-0 record and 2.66 ERA with 33 strikeouts and one save 23 2/3 innings pitched. On September 21, the Tigers selected Rainey's contract, adding him to their active roster. In two appearances for Detroit, he struggled to a 13.50 ERA with two strikeouts over two innings of work. Rainey was designated for assignment by the Tigers on November 18. On November 21, he was non-tendered by Detroit and became a free agent.

On November 26, 2025, Rainey re-signed with the Tigers on a minor league contract. Across 39 appearances for Triple–A Toledo, he logged a 5–3 record and 2.32 ERA with 60 strikeouts and two saves. On August 11, 2026, the Tigers selected Rainey's contract, adding him to their active roster. He made six appearances for Detroit, recording a 3.86 ERA with six strikeouts over seven innings pitched. Rainey was designated for assignment by the team on August 31. On September 2, he cleared waivers and was sent outright to Triple-A Toledo. He elected free agency on October 3.

== Personal life ==
Rainey is married to his wife Kelsey. The couple has two children: Ryker and Rory. Their son, Ryker Scott was born on December 7, 2021. Their daughter, Rory Rae, was born on January 26, 2023.
