= 2019 National League Championship Series =

Team (Wins)	Managers	Season
Washington Nationals (4)	Dave Martinez	93–69 (.574), GB: 4
St. Louis Cardinals (0)	Mike Shildt	91–71 (.562), GA: 2
- Dates: October 11–15
- MVP: Howie Kendrick (Washington)
- Umpires: Chris Conroy, Fieldin Culbreth, Phil Cuzzi, Chad Fairchild, Chris Guccione, (Note: During the postseason, there are seven umpires to a crew. One umpire is designated as the replay official and is assigned to MLB's New York office with replay officials for the first two games of the series. At the first travel day, the replay official umpire is assigned to the field for the remainder of the series while another umpire is designated the replay official. Guccione was the Game 1 and Game 2 replay official, while Muchlinski was the replay official for the remaining games.) Bill Miller (crew chief), Mike Muchlinski

Broadcast
- Television: TBS
- TV announcers: Brian Anderson, Ron Darling, Jeff Francoeur and Lauren Shehadi
- Radio: ESPN
- Radio announcers: Jon Sciambi and Jessica Mendoza
- NLDS: Washington Nationals over Los Angeles Dodgers (3–2); St. Louis Cardinals over Atlanta Braves (3–2)

The 2019 National League Championship Series was a best-of-seven series in Major League Baseball’s 2019 postseason between the two winners of the 2019 National League Division Series, the third-seeded St. Louis Cardinals and the fourth-seeded Washington Nationals, for the National League (NL) pennant and the right to play in the 2019 World Series. The series was scheduled in a 2–3–2 format, with the Cardinals having homefield advantage because the Nationals were a wild card team. The series was the 50th NLCS in league history, (Note: The NLCS was first played in 1969; the 10th series was 1978 and the 20th series was 1988. As there was no postseason in 1994 due to a work stoppage, the 30th series was 1999 and the 40th series was 2009, making 2019 the 50th series.) with TBS televising all games in the United States.

For the third straight year, Major League Baseball sold presenting sponsorships to all of its postseason series; as with the ALCS, this NLCS was sponsored by GEICO and officially known as the 2019 National League Championship Series presented by GEICO.

This was the second NLCS in which the winning team never trailed during a game (the other being in 2015) and the second postseason series in which the winning team scored first in every game and never relinquished a lead once taken (the first being the 1966 World Series). This was also the first NLCS since 2015 to end in a sweep and the fourth best-of-seven NLCS to do so (the others being in 2007 and 1995).

The Nationals won their first National League pennant, and would go on to defeat the Houston Astros in the World Series in seven games, winning their first World Series championship in franchise history and bringing Washington D.C. its first World Series title since the Washington Senators back in 1924. The Nationals also became the second team to sweep their opponent in the LCS since the series became best-of-seven, and subsequently win the World Series (the first being the Atlanta Braves in 1995).

== Background ==
Both of the best-of-five National League Division Series went the full five games. This was the first time since the 2012 NLDS that both series went to five games.

The Washington Nationals, winners of the National League Wild Card Game, upset the top-seeded Los Angeles Dodgers. The Nationals were 19–31 on May 23, then went 74–38 the rest of the season to finish in the top NL wild card spot.

The St. Louis Cardinals were 44–44 at the All-Star break, and also finished the season strong, going 47–27 after the break and winning their first National League Central title in four years. As a third-seed, the Cardinals upset the second seed Atlanta Braves.

This was the 14th NLCS appearance for the Cardinals, who had a 7–6 record in prior Championship Series. It was the second NLCS appearance for the Nationals, who lost the 1981 NLCS when they were the Montreal Expos.

The only prior postseason meeting between these two teams was the 2012 NLDS, won by St. Louis. The Cardinals and Nationals faced each other seven times during the 2019 regular season, with the Cardinals winning five of those games.

== Summary ==
Washington won the series, 4–0.

Game	Date	Score	Location	Time	Attendance
1	October 11	Washington Nationals – 2, St. Louis Cardinals – 0	Busch Stadium	3:24	45,075
2	October 12	Washington Nationals – 3, St. Louis Cardinals – 1	Busch Stadium	2:53	46,458
3	October 14	St. Louis Cardinals – 1, Washington Nationals – 8	Nationals Park	3:26	43,675
4	October 15	St. Louis Cardinals – 4, Washington Nationals – 7	Nationals Park	3:02	43,976

== Game summaries ==
=== Game 1 ===
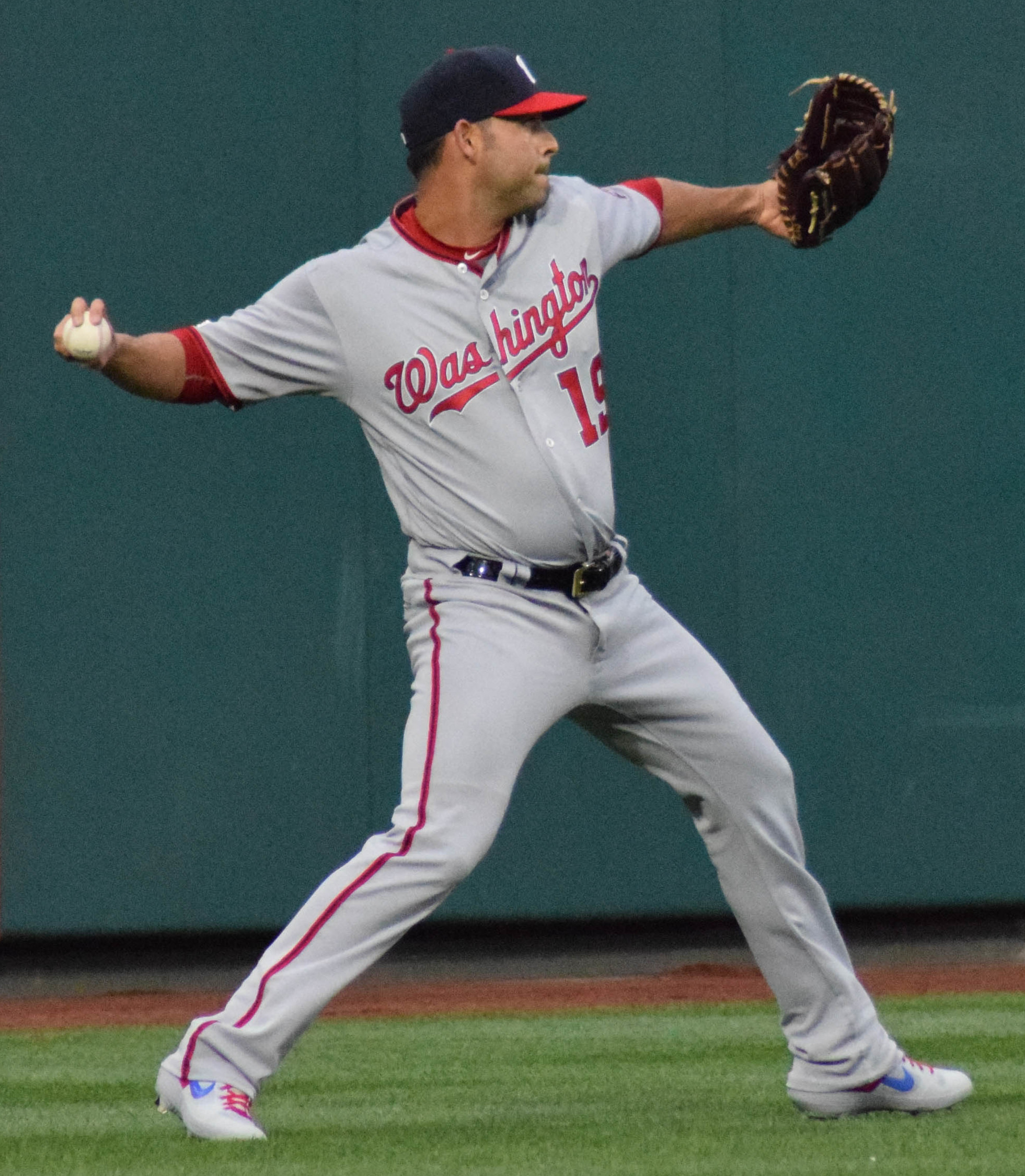
Aníbal Sánchez allowed only a single hit and got the win in Game 1.

Friday, October 11, 2019 7:08 pm (CDT) at Busch Stadium in St. Louis, Missouri, 45 °F (7 °C), partly cloudy
Team	1	2	3	4	5	6	7	8	9	R	H	E
Washington	0	1	0	0	0	0	1	0	0	2	10	1
St. Louis	0	0	0	0	0	0	0	0	0	0	1	0
WP: Aníbal Sánchez (1–0) LP: Miles Mikolas (0–1) Sv: Sean Doolittle (1); Attendance: 45,075; Boxscore

The Nationals entered Game 1 without closer Daniel Hudson, who was placed on paternity leave; Wander Suero was activated in his place. Washington got one run in the second as Yan Gomes drove in Howie Kendrick with a two-out double. Cardinals starting pitcher Miles Mikolas went six innings, allowing one run on seven hits while striking out seven. The Nationals added a run in the seventh, again with two outs, as Kendrick drove in Adam Eaton, who had tripled. In the 8th inning, 1st basemen Ryan Zimmerman made a Superman diving catch that temporarily preserved a no-hitter for Nationals pitcher Anibal Sanchez, although Sanchez did allow a hit later in the inning and lost the no-hit bid.[48] Washington starting pitcher Aníbal Sánchez did not allow a hit until a two-out single by José Martínez in the eighth inning; Sánchez struck out five, walked one, and hit two batsmen in 7 2/3 innings. Sean Doolittle relieved Sánchez and recorded the final four outs, giving Washington the 2–0 win and a 1–0 lead in the series. Sánchez had also been the starting pitcher in the most recent prior one-hitter in playoff history, Game 1 of the 2013 ALCS, coming against the Boston Red Sox when he played for the Detroit Tigers. It was Doolittle's first save this postseason.

=== Game 2 ===
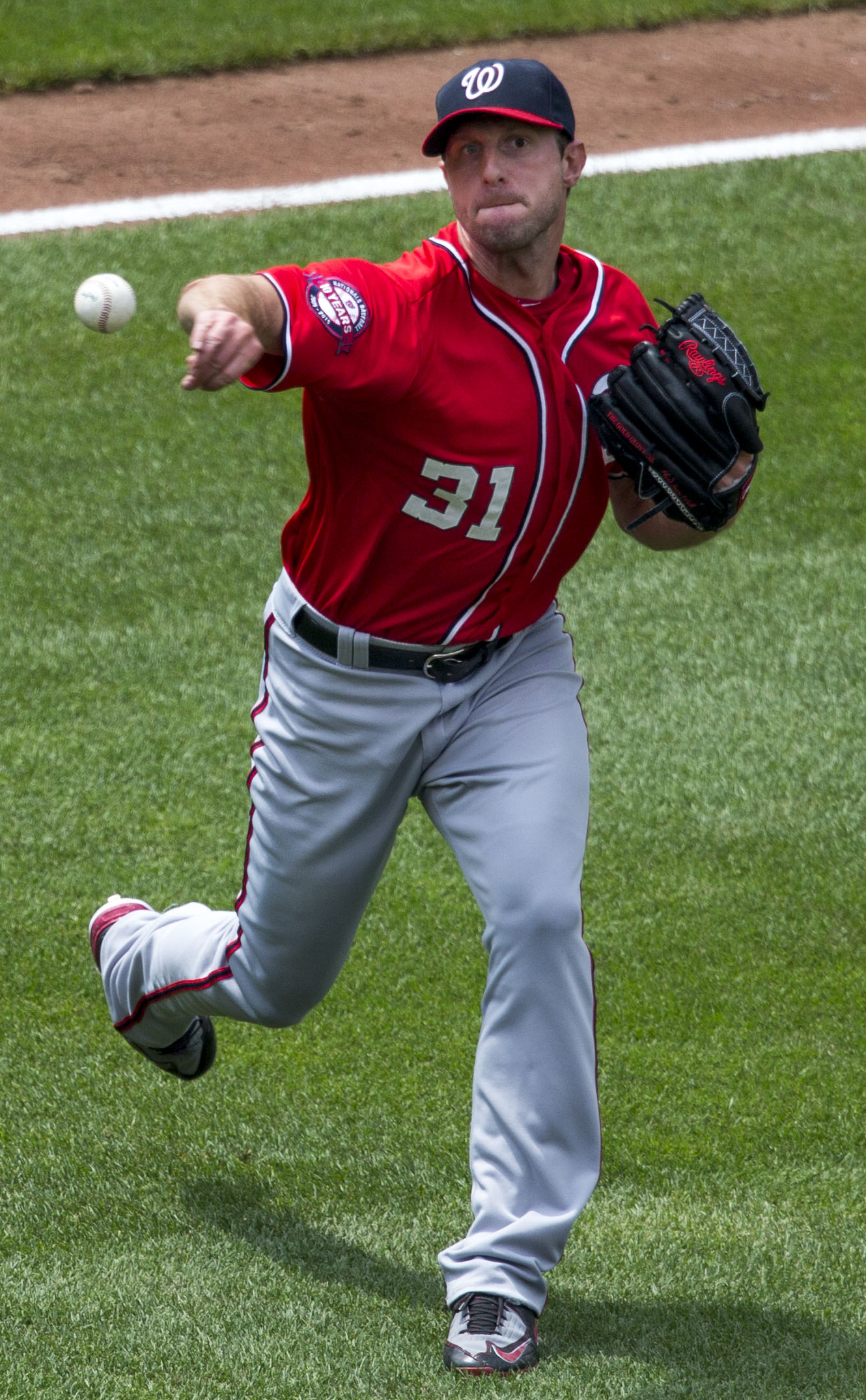
Washington starter Max Scherzer held the Cardinals to one hit in seven innings while striking out 11 in Game 2.

Saturday, October 12, 2019 3:08 pm (CDT) at Busch Stadium in St. Louis, Missouri, 59 °F (15 °C), sunny
Team	1	2	3	4	5	6	7	8	9	R	H	E
Washington	0	0	1	0	0	0	0	2	0	3	7	0
St. Louis	0	0	0	0	0	0	0	1	0	1	3	0
WP: Max Scherzer (1–0) LP: Adam Wainwright (0–1) Sv: Daniel Hudson (1); Home runs: WAS: Michael A. Taylor (1); STL: None; Attendance: 46,458; Boxscore

Nationals closer Daniel Hudson returned to the team from paternity leave. Washington took a 1–0 lead in the top of the third inning on a home run by Michael A. Taylor. Washington starting pitcher Max Scherzer did not allow a hit until Paul Goldschmidt led off the seventh inning with a single; Scherzer allowed only the one hit, struck out 11, and walked two in seven innings. By holding the Cardinals hitless through the first five innings of each of their starts, Scherzer and teammate Aníbal Sánchez repeated a feat they accomplished in Games 1 and 2 of the 2013 American League Championship Series, a feat no other pair of pitchers has ever accomplished in the postseason. The Nationals added two runs in the eighth when Adam Eaton hit a double into the right field corner to drive in Matt Adams and Trea Turner. Paul DeJong scored the Cardinals' first run of the series in the eighth inning ahead of a double by José Martínez over Taylor's outstretched glove. Hudson then retired the final two hitters on fly outs, the second a foul popup to first base, to record the save, his third this postseason.

=== Game 3 ===
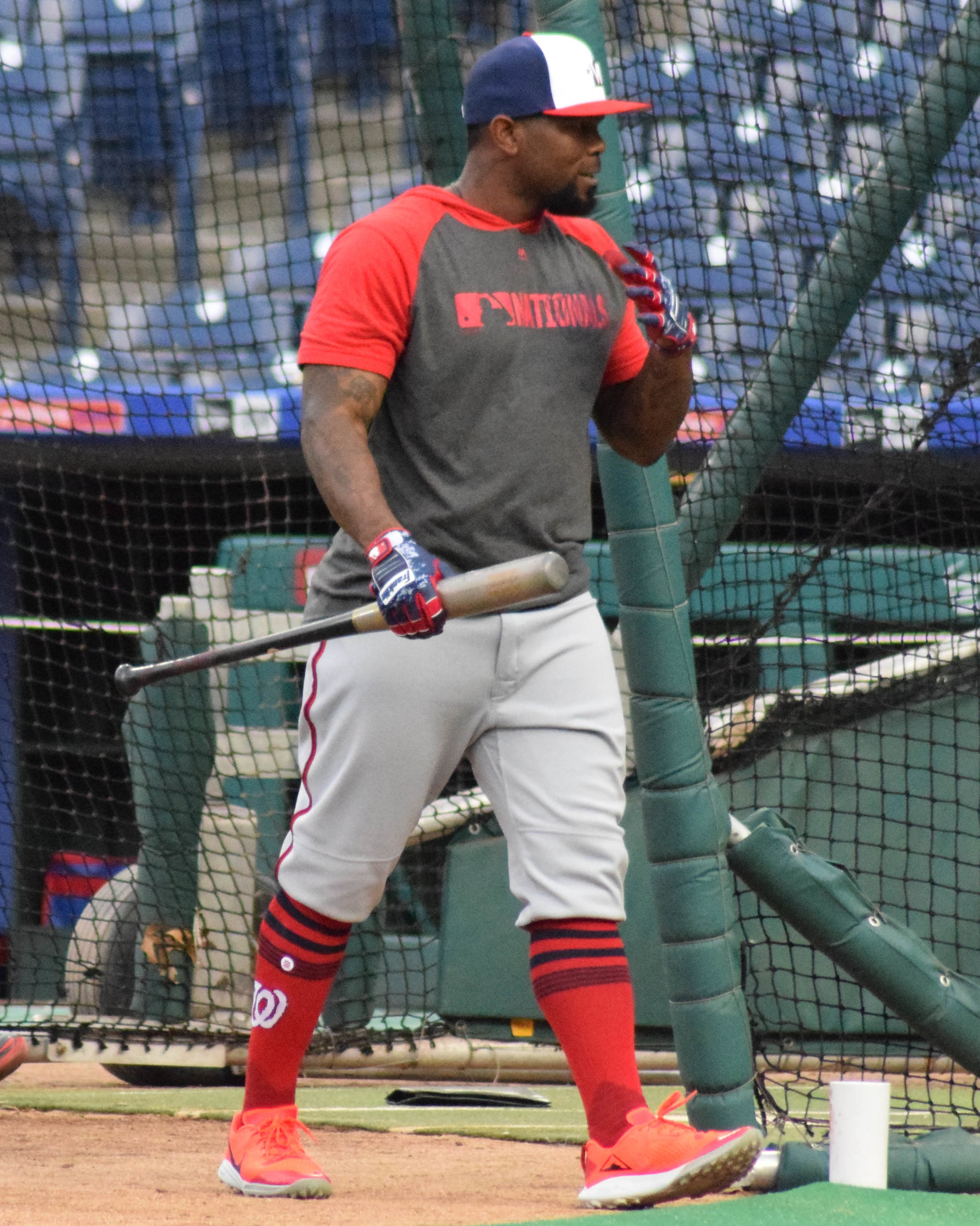
Howie Kendrick had three doubles and drove in three runs in Game 3.

Monday, October 14, 2019 7:38 pm (EDT) at Nationals Park in Washington, D.C. 71 °F (22 °C), clear
Team	1	2	3	4	5	6	7	8	9	R	H	E
St. Louis	0	0	0	0	0	0	1	0	0	1	7	0
Washington	0	0	4	0	2	1	1	0	X	8	11	1
WP: Stephen Strasburg (1–0) LP: Jack Flaherty (0–1); Home runs: STL: None; WAS: Víctor Robles (1); Attendance: 43,675; Boxscore

Game 3 starting pitchers were Jack Flaherty for the Cardinals and Stephen Strasburg for the Nationals. Washington scored first, in the third inning; with a runner on first and two outs, a single, double, walk, wild pitch, and another double pushed across four runs. Flaherty exited after four innings, having allowed four runs on five hits while striking out six. Washington added two more runs in the fifth inning, again starting with a runner on first and two outs, via back-to-back doubles. A Víctor Robles home run in the sixth inning extended the lead to 7–0. Each team scored once in the seventh inning, yielding an 8–1 final score and giving Washington a commanding 3–0 lead in the series, as Tanner Rainey concluded matters by working the ninth, and retired Tommy Edman on a flyout to Juan Soto to win it. Flaherty took the loss, while Strasburg was credited with the win, having allowed one run on seven hits while striking out 12 in seven innings.

=== Game 4 ===
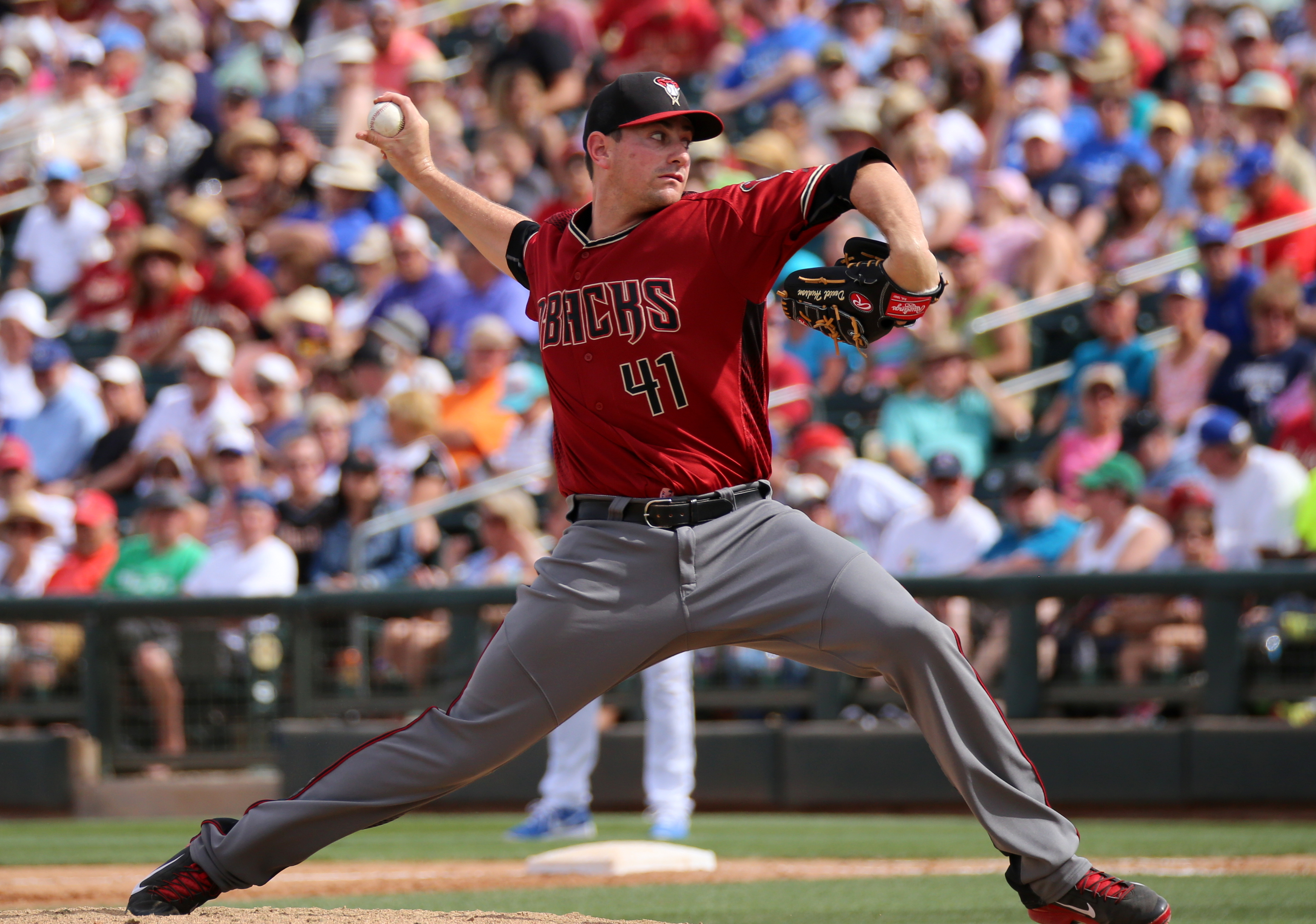
Daniel Hudson earned the save in Game 4, his second of this NLCS.

Tuesday, October 15, 2019 8:05 pm (EDT) at Nationals Park in Washington, D.C., 64 °F (18 °C), clear, wind 5 mph out to LF
Team	1	2	3	4	5	6	7	8	9	R	H	E
St. Louis	0	0	0	1	3	0	0	0	0	4	5	1
Washington	7	0	0	0	0	0	0	0	x	7	9	0
WP: Patrick Corbin (1–0) LP: Dakota Hudson (0–1) Sv: Daniel Hudson (2); Home runs: STL: Yadier Molina (1); WAS: None; Attendance: 43,976; Boxscore

Game 4 starting pitchers were Dakota Hudson for the Cardinals and Patrick Corbin for the Nationals. The Nationals chased Hudson in the first inning by scoring seven runs on a sacrifice fly, double, and three singles. For the night, Hudson pitched 1/3 of an inning, allowing seven runs (four earned) on five hits, one walk, and a dropped-throw error by second baseman Kolten Wong. Hudson's seven runs allowed tied the playoff record for most runs allowed in a start lasting 1/3 of an inning or less, a record set by Mike Foltynewicz in Game 5 of the 2019 NLDS, ironically against the Cardinals. The Cardinals scored their first run in the fourth on a home run by Yadier Molina and three more in the fifth on an RBI groundout by Tommy Edman and a two-run double by José Martínez. Corbin was credited with the win after allowing four runs on four hits in five innings; he also walked three and struck out 12. Washington closer Daniel Hudson entered the game with two outs in the eighth inning. After hitting Molina with a pitch and walking Paul DeJong, Hudson retired the final four batters he faced, retiring Tommy Edman on a fly out to center fielder Victor Robles for the final out, to record his fourth save of this postseason. The win sent the Nationals to the World Series for the first time in the franchise's 51-year history dating back to their founding as the Montreal Expos in 1969. The 51 seasons represented the most seasons for a team to win their first league pennant in MLB history. Howie Kendrick was voted the MVP of the series.

=== Composite line score ===
2019 NLCS (4–0): Washington Nationals beat St. Louis Cardinals

Team	1	2	3	4	5	6	7	8	9	R	H	E
Washington Nationals	7	1	5	0	2	1	2	2	0	20	37	2
St. Louis Cardinals	0	0	0	1	3	0	1	1	0	6	16	1
Total attendance: 179,184 Average attendance: 44,796

== Series overview and aftermath ==
2019 represented the first appearance in the World Series for a Washington team since 1933. The Nationals were the last National League team to appear in the World Series, leaving the Seattle Mariners as the only team in Major League Baseball to have never made it.

The Cardinals' .130 batting average (16-for-123) set an NLCS record for lowest team batting average. This feat would be broken six years later when the Brewers hit .118 in the 2025 NLCS, which was not only the lowest ever batting average for an NLCS, but of any team in the postseason in a series of at least three games.

This was the start of a short-lived era in Cardinals baseball, which blended the core of the 2010s teams (Molina, Wainwright), and their productive farm system (Bader, Flaherty, Edman, O'Neil), with star players from blockbuster trades (Goldschmidt, Arenado). They would lose to the San Diego Padres in the Wild Card Series during the 2020 pandemic-affected season. The 2021 Cardinals, who traded for star third baseman Nolan Arenado before the season, won 22 of their final 25 regular-season games, which included a 17-game winning streak, the longest in franchise history; however, they lost the Wild Card Game to the Los Angeles Dodgers on a walk-off home run by Chris Taylor. Finally, they lost to the Philadelphia Phillies in the Wild Card Series in a two-game sweep in 2022. This marked the end of Albert Pujols' (who came back to St. Louis for one last season) and Yadier Molina's career, as well as Adam Wainwright's last postseason appearance, as he retired the following season. They have not made the playoffs since the 2022 season.

2019 also represented a high point for the Nationals franchise after winning the World Series against Houston in seven games, as they have not been back to the playoffs since.

== See also ==
- 2019 American League Championship Series
