= Víctor Robles =

Dominican baseball player (born 1997)

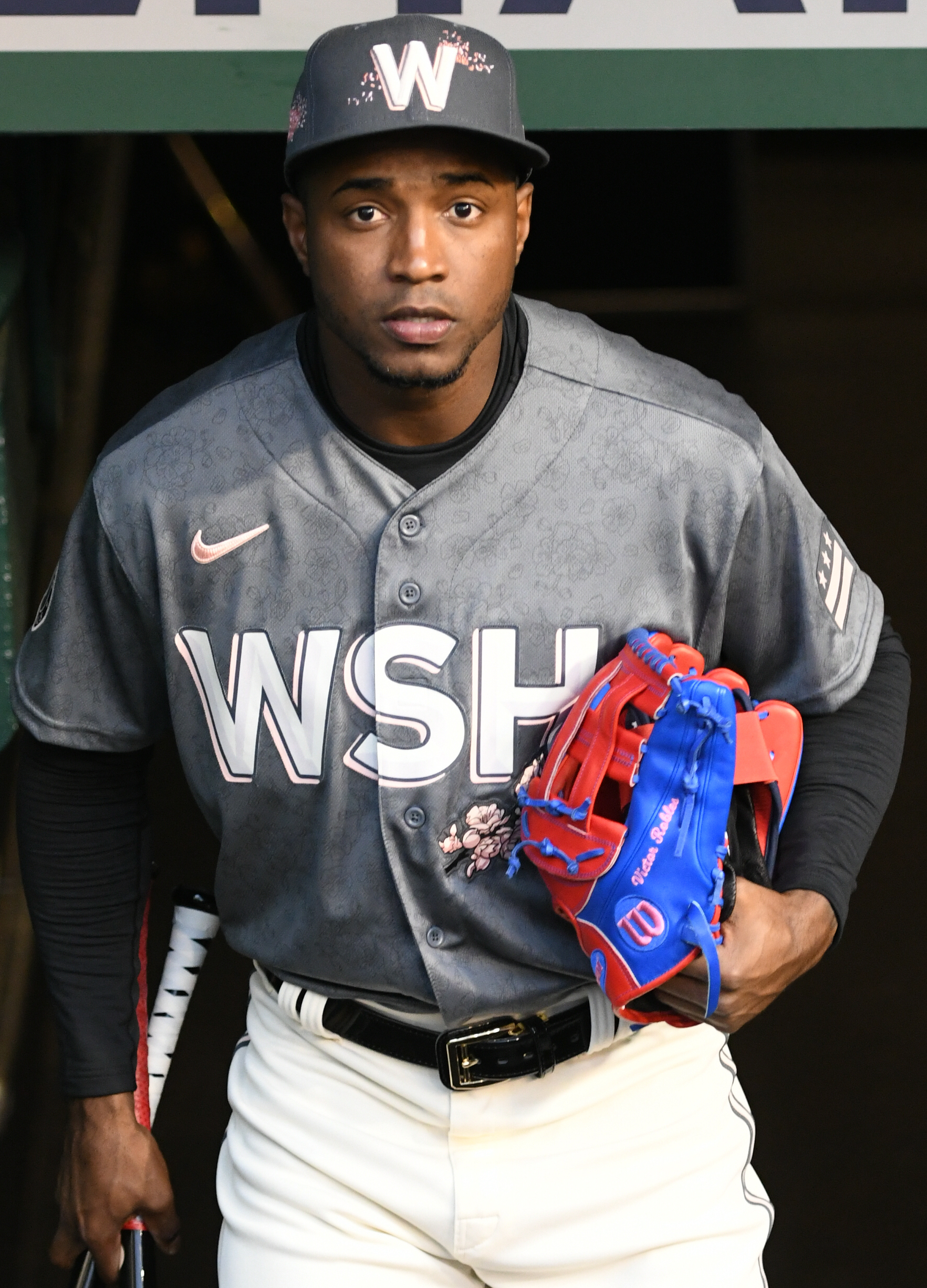
- Robles with the Washington Nationals in 2022

Free agent
- Outfielder
- Born: May 19, 1997 (age 29); Santo Domingo Este, Dominican Republic
- Bats: Right Throws: Right

MLB debut
- September 7, 2017, for the Washington Nationals

MLB statistics (through 2026 season)
- Batting average: .248
- Home runs: 36
- Runs batted in: 200
- Stats at Baseball Reference

Teams
- Washington Nationals (2017–2024); Seattle Mariners (2024–2026)

Career highlights and awards
- World Series champion (2019)

Víctor Enrique Robles Brito (born May 19, 1997) is a Dominican professional baseball outfielder who is a free agent. He has played in Major League Baseball (MLB) for the Washington Nationals and Seattle Mariners and was part of the Nationals' 2019 World Series victory. Robles signed with the Nationals as an international free agent in 2013 and made his MLB debut in 2017.

== Career ==
=== Washington Nationals ===
==== Minor leagues ====
Robles signed with the Washington Nationals as an international free agent in 2013, receiving a $225,000 signing bonus. He made his professional debut in 2014 with the Dominican Summer League Nationals in the rookie-level Dominican Summer League, batting .313 with three home runs, 25 runs batted in (RBI), and 26 stolen bases in 47 games. Robles started 2015 with the Gulf Coast Nationals in the rookie-level Gulf Coast League, playing in 23 games and hitting .370 with two home runs, 11 RBI, and 12 stolen bases before he was promoted to the Auburn Doubledays in the Low-A New York–Penn League. He finished the season with Auburn, hitting .343 with two home runs, 16 RBI, and 12 stolen bases for the Doubledays.

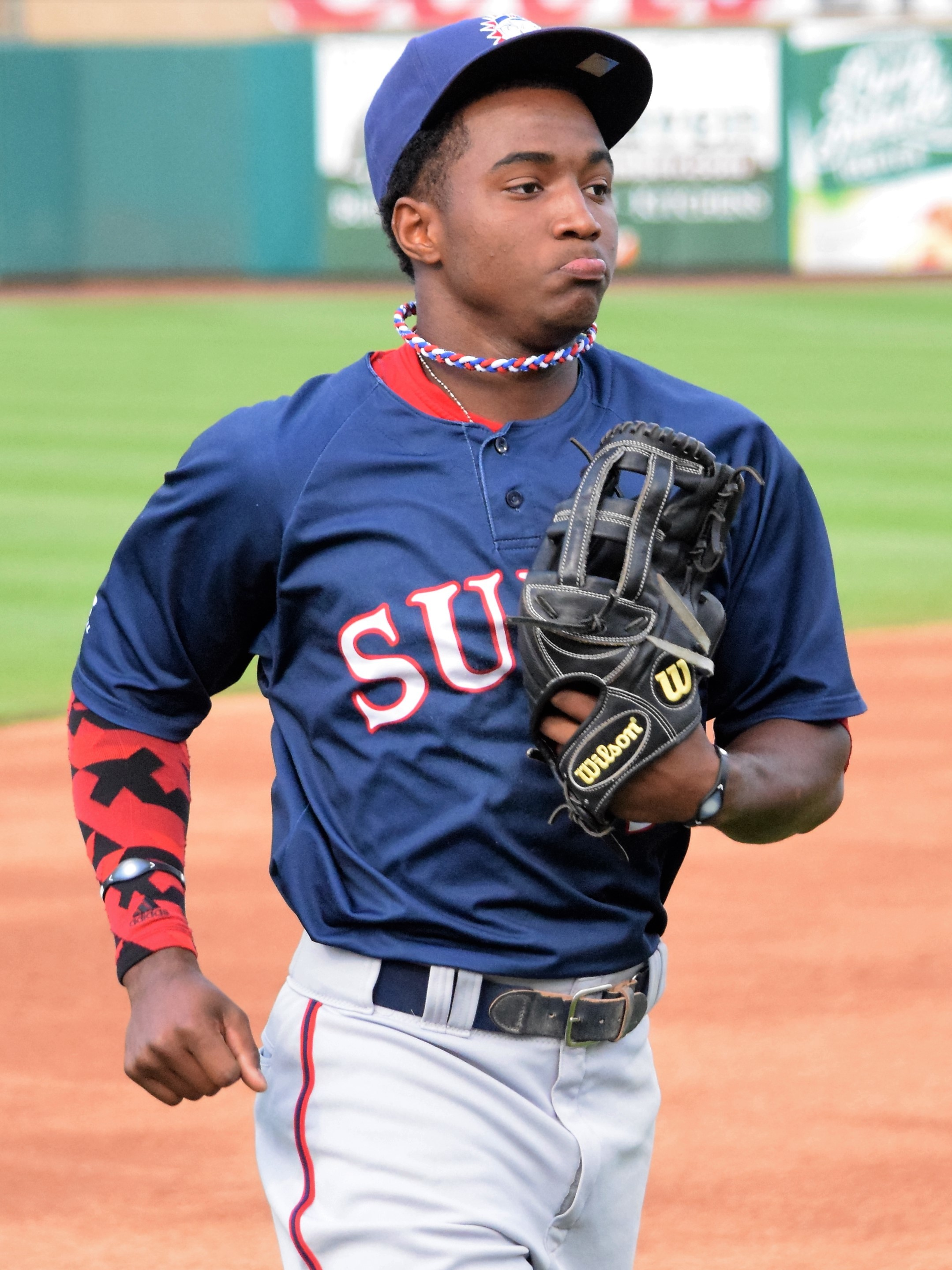
Robles with the Hagerstown Suns in 2016

Robles began the 2016 season with the Hagerstown Suns of the Single-A South Atlantic League. In 64 games for the Suns, he hit .305 with five home runs, and stealing 19 bases. He earned a promotion to the Potomac Nationals of the High-A Carolina League in late June, where he spent the rest of the season, except for a brief rehabilitation stint with the Gulf Coast League Nationals after returning from the seven-day disabled list. In 41 games with Potomac, he batted .262, hit three home runs, and stole 18 bases. For the three teams combined, he hit .280 with nine home runs, 42 RBI, and 37 stolen bases during 2016.

Robles became the Nationals' top prospect after the team traded pitcher Lucas Giolito to the Chicago White Sox on December 7, 2016. Writer Jim Callis said that same month that he believed Robles could be considered the top overall prospect in baseball by the end of 2017. In July 2017, MLB Pipeline ranked Robles as the fifth-best prospect in baseball.

Robles began the 2017 season with Potomac. He was selected to play in the All-Star Futures Game. On July 24, after 77 games with Potomac, batting .289 with seven home runs, 33 RBI, and 16 stolen bases, the Nationals promoted Robles to the Harrisburg Senators of the Double-A Eastern League. Robles finished the minor-league season with Harrisburg, batting .324 with an .883 on-base plus slugging, 3 home runs, 14 RBI, and 11 stolen bases in 37 games with the Senators.

==== Major leagues ====
===== 2017 =====
After the Eastern League season ended, the Nationals promoted Robles to the major leagues for the first time on September 7, 2017. Having turned 20 in May, Robles was the youngest player in the 2017 MLB season. He debuted that night against the Philadelphia Phillies as a pinch hitter, flying out to right field. On September 10, Robles reached base safely for the first time in his major league career after being hit by a pitch. Later in the game, he got his first career major league hit, a double off the Nationals Park scoreboard, also getting his first RBI. However, he was called out while trying to stretch the double into a triple, sliding past third base. He finished the regular season with the Nationals batting .250 with a double, two triples, and four RBI in 13 games. He made the Nationals' postseason playoff roster and appeared in two games in the National League Division Series (NLDS), striking out in his only plate appearance but scoring one run.

After Washington lost the NLDS to the Chicago Cubs in five games, Robles played in the Arizona Fall League. In 13 games with the Mesa Solar Sox, he went 10-for-41 (.244), had a .389 on-base percentage, hit three home runs and one double, drove in seven runs, and stole seven bases. He was named the Most Valuable Player of the league's Fall Stars Game after going 1-for-3 with a walk, driving in a run, and scoring two runs.

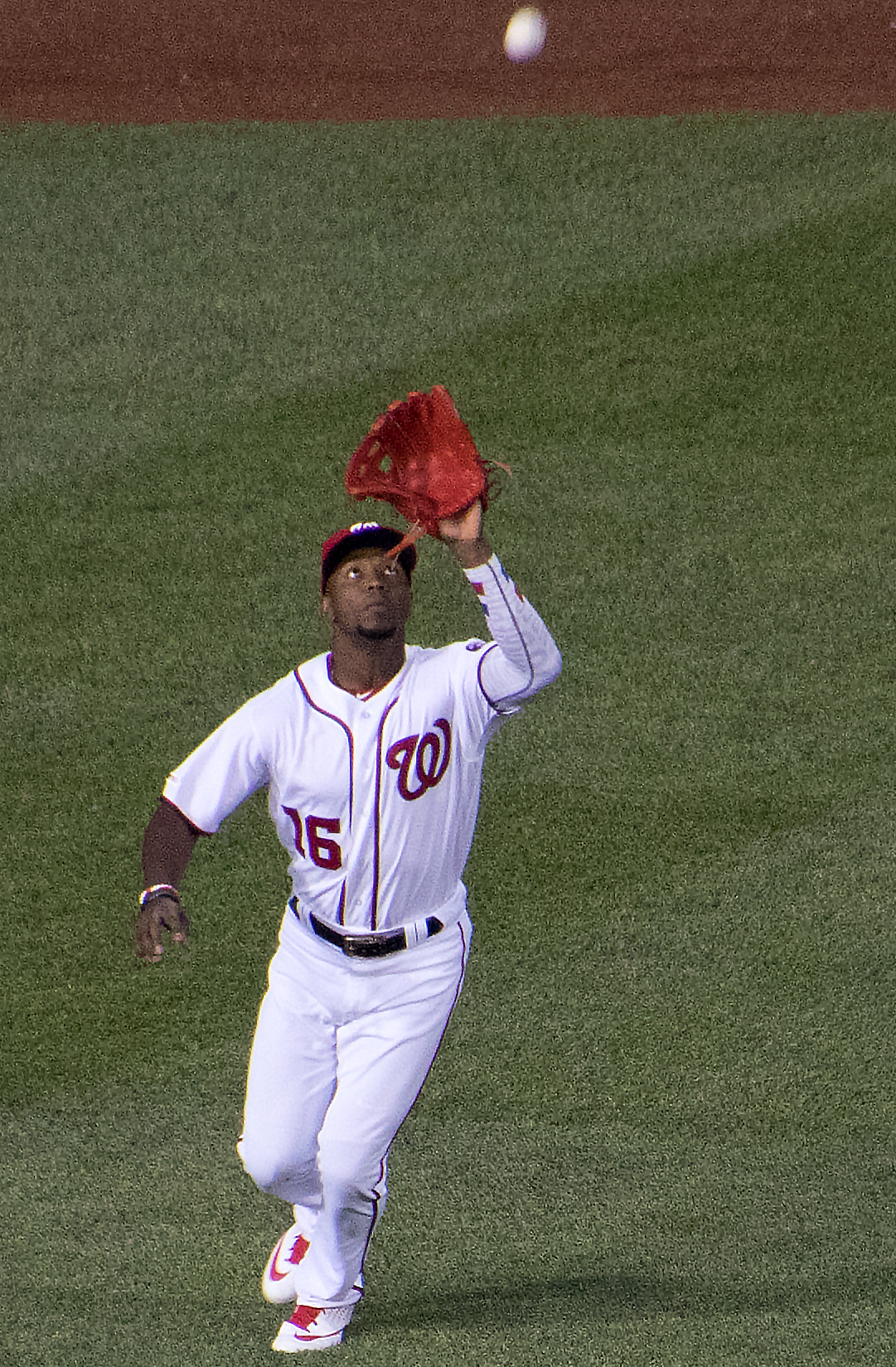
Robles with the Nationals in 2019.

===== 2018–2019 =====
Robles hit .188 in 21 spring-training games in 2018 before the Nationals optioned him to the Syracuse Chiefs of the Triple-A International League. Ranked as the sixth-best prospect in baseball by MLB.com, he went 4-for-4 with a walk in his second game with Syracuse, driving in a run, stealing a base, and scoring two runs, including the go-ahead run in the ninth inning that gave the Chiefs a win; three of his hits came on the first pitch. He started the year 5-for-13 (.385) with one RBI into his fourth game of the year when, on April 9, he hyperextended his elbow while diving to make a catch in shallow center field. He was removed from the game. His injury did not require surgery, but it forced him onto the disabled list. Robles started a rehab assignment with the Gulf Coast League Nationals on July 7, alongside fellow Chiefs outfielder Alejandro De Aza. He rejoined the Nationals on September 4. In less than one month in the majors in 2018, he batted .288/.349/.525 with three home runs, ten RBI, and three stolen bases in five attempts in 66 plate appearances. He was the seventh-youngest player in the National League (NL).

In 2019, Robles batted .255/.326/.419 with 17 home runs, 65 RBI, 25 hit by pitch (second in the NL), and 28 stolen bases (5th) in 37 attempts. In his rookie season, he had the highest percentage of soft contact and lowest percentage of hard contact percentage among NL batters. Robles had an average exit velocity of 83.3 mph on balls in play, the second slowest in baseball. Defensively, he had 23 Defensive Runs Saved (DRS), the best among major league center fielders. He led all center fielders with 12 assists but also tied for the NL lead with 6 outfield errors. He was a finalist for the NL Gold Glove Award in center field, losing to Lorenzo Cain.

Robles started the postseason hot, batting .313 in five games from the Wild Card Game through the National League Championship Series. He missed several playoff games with a hamstring injury. Robles started all seven World Series games, hitting just .160 in the bottom third of the batting order, as the Nationals defeated the Houston Astros to win their first championship.

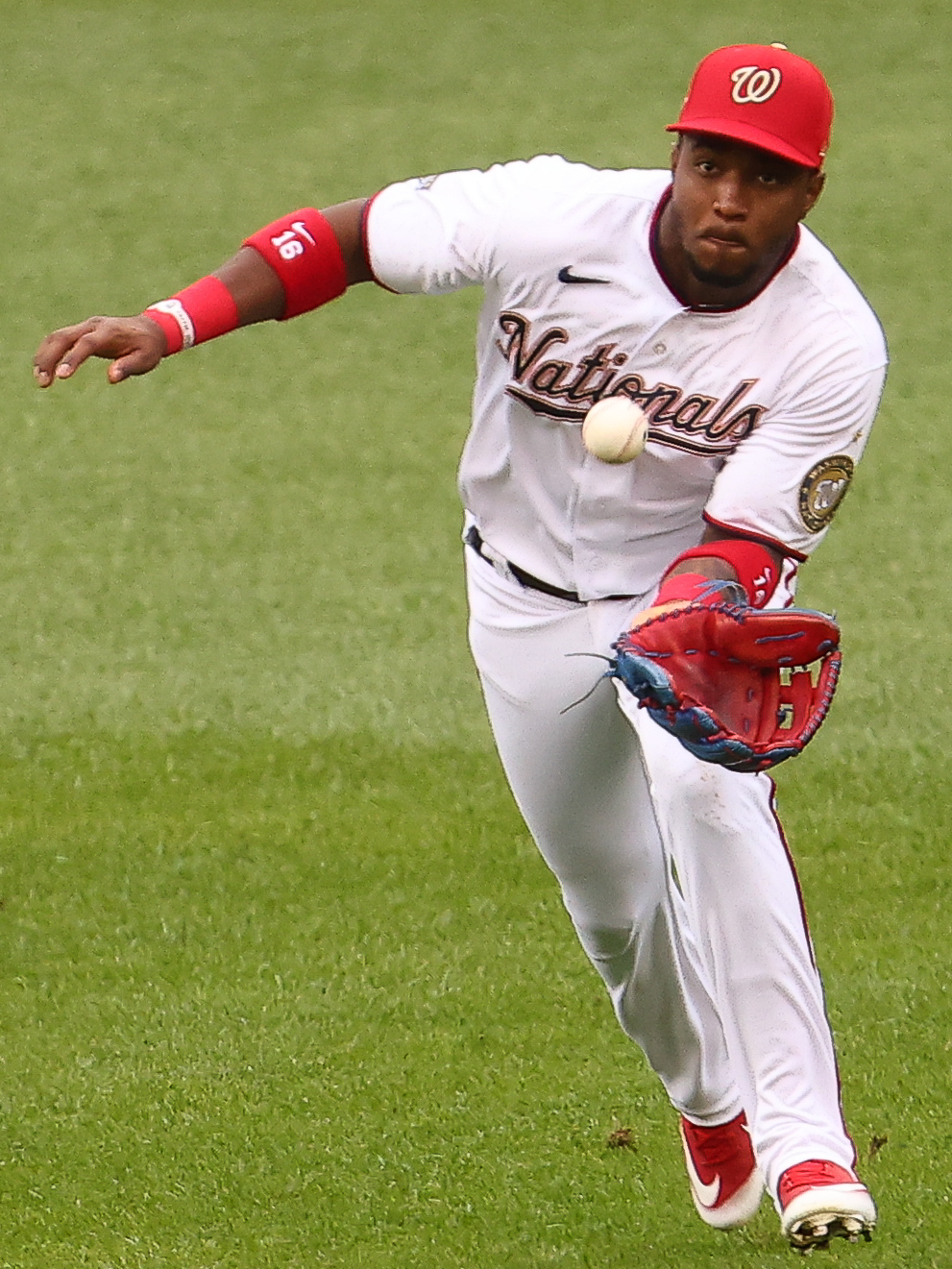
Robles with the Nationals in 2020

===== 2020–2024 =====
In 2020, Robles batted .220/.293/.315 with three home runs and 15 RBI in 189 plate appearances. He had the lowest slugging percentage of all NL hitters. Balls he hit had an average exit velocity of 82.2 mph, the third slowest in the majors.

Robles offense further diminished in 2021, as he hit .203/.310/.295 with two home runs and 19 RBI in 369 plate appearances. His average exit velocity of 84.1 mph was the fourth slowest in baseball. On August 31, he was optioned to the Triple-A Rochester Red Wings.

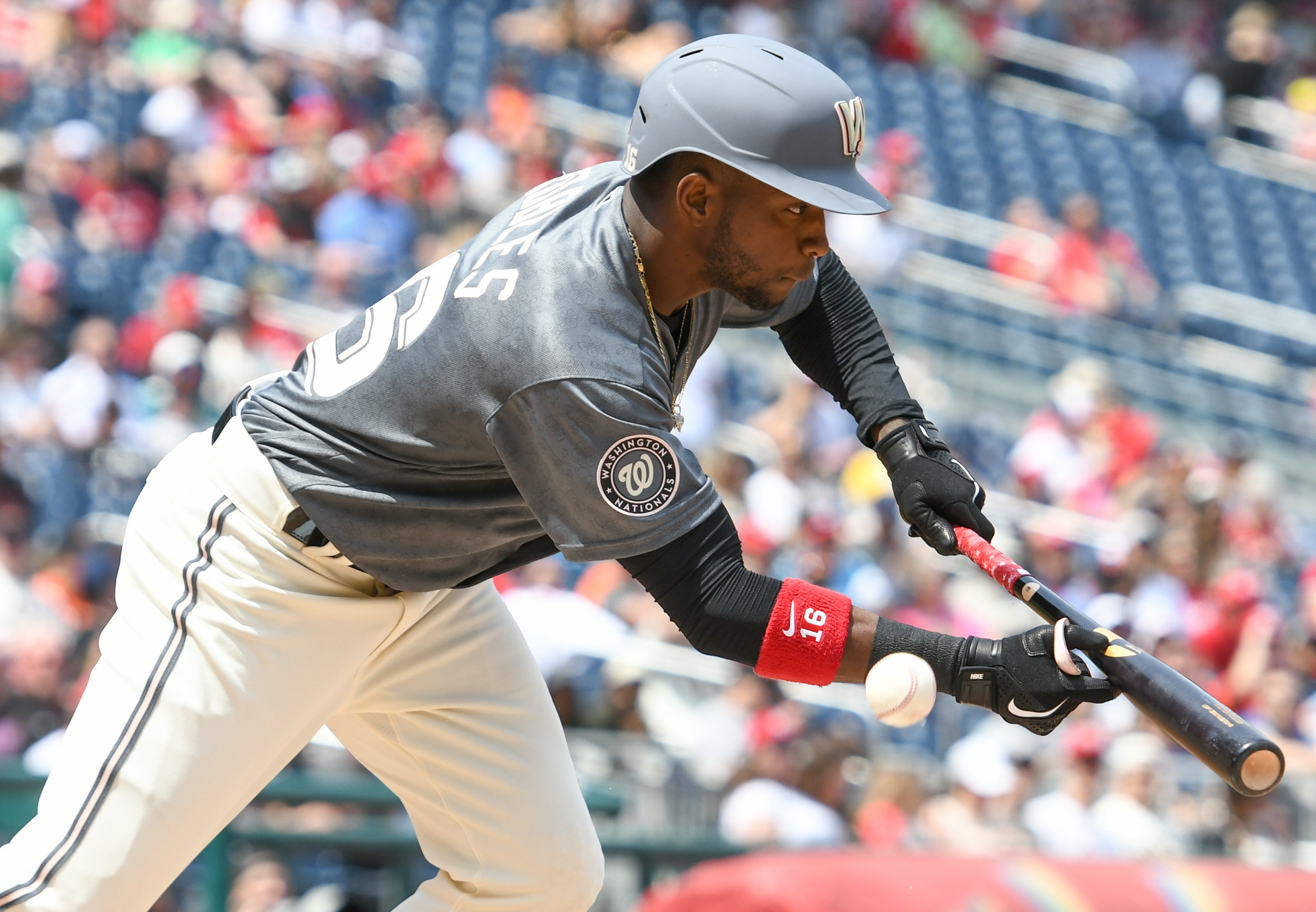
Robles bunting in 2022

Robles started 2022 with a new batting stance after working with hitting coach Darnell Coles. He batted .224/.273/.311 in 406 plate appearances and led the major leagues with 10 bunt hits. On defense, he led NL center fielders with 7 assists and 6 errors. Balls he hit had an average exit velocity of 84.6 mph, again the third slowest in the majors. After playing in 36 games in 2023, Robles was placed on the injured list with back spasms on June 21. He was transferred to the 60-day injured list on July 26, not returning to action.

Robles played in 14 games for the Nationals in 2024, hitting .120/.281/.120 with two RBI and four stolen bases. On May 27, Robles was designated for assignment by Washington, and the team released him on June 1.

=== Seattle Mariners ===
==== 2024 ====
On June 4, 2024, Robles signed a major league contract with the Seattle Mariners. He became the team's leadoff hitter by the end of July and played all three outfield positions, often filling in for Julio Rodríguez in center field. On August 12, he signed a two-year, $9.75 million extension with the Mariners, with a $9 million team option for 2027. Robles had one of the most productive stretches of his big league career with the Mariners in 2024, batting .328 with 4 home runs and 30 stolen bases in 77 games. His only caught stealing attempt with Seattle came on a failed steal of home on September 17. In his next plate appearance, he was hit by a Luis Gil pitch, injuring his right index finger which forced him out of the game, a blowout loss to the New York Yankees.

==== 2025–2026 ====
Robles was the Mariners' Opening Day right fielder in 2025. On April 6, he made a diving catch into the netting in foul territory at Oracle Park. He dislocated his left shoulder on the play, and the eventual winning run tagged up and advanced into scoring position on the play. Within days, Robles was placed on the 10-day injured list and ruled out for at least 12 weeks. He said he did not regret making the catch.

On a minor league rehab assignment with the Triple-A Tacoma Rainiers in August, Robles was ejected after he threw his bat at Las Vegas Aviators pitcher Joey Estes. Estes' previous pitch was inside and almost hit Robles, who had been hit by five pitches in his previous 15 times at bat. MLB issued a 10-game suspension for Robles for throwing his bat. He appealed the suspension, which was reduced to 7 games. Robles was officially activated from the injured list on August 23 and began serving his suspension on August 29. He hit his only home run of the season on September 19 in a win over the Houston Astros. The next night, Robles made a diving catch to start a game-ending double play in another win in Houston. He finished the regular season batting .245/.281/.330 with one home run and 6 stolen bases in 32 games.

Robles dealt with a left shoulder injury at the end of the season but started for the Mariners in the American League Division Series. He batted .111 with two doubles and seven walks and was caught stealing twice in 10 postseason games.

Robles began the 2026 season sharing a right field platoon with Luke Raley. Robles missed eight weeks of the season with a pectoral strain. In 65 games, he batted .256 with no home runs and 10 steals. On October 29, the Mariners declined their $9 million option on Robles, making him a free agent.

== Playing style ==
As a prospect in 2016, Robles was considered a five-tool player, with speed as his best asset and his power lagging. His speed in 2016 was compared to then-Nationals shortstop Trea Turner, one of the fastest runners in baseball. In 2017, Robles' sprint speed of 30.9 feet per second was best in the majors, but by 2024, it had dropped to 27.8 feet per second, which was outside the top 25 percent of major league players. His throwing arm strength ranked in the top 7 percent of baseball in every season from 2020 through 2024.

Robles consistently has one of the slowest average exit velocities among major league hitters. This leads him to have low slugging percentages, though his speed has allowed him to have at least 20 doubles in four seasons.

== Personal life ==
Robles and his wife have a son. He has two pet monkeys, Kikito and Keka.
