= Mike Rizzo =

American baseball executive (born 1960)

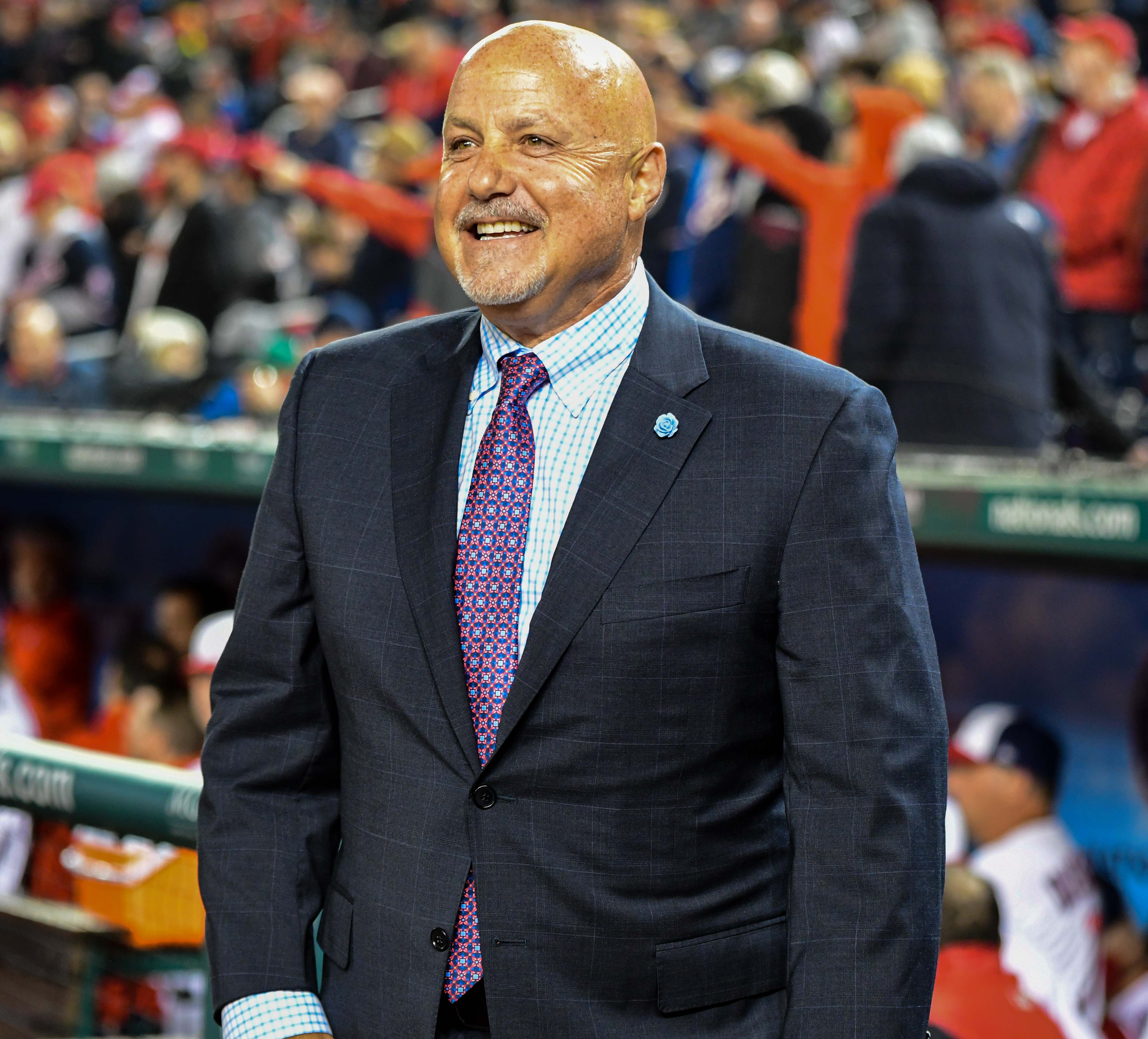
- Rizzo in 2022
- Born: December 14, 1960 (age 65); Chicago, Illinois, U.S.
- Stats at Baseball Reference

Teams
- As executive: Chicago White Sox Scout; Boston Red Sox Scout; Arizona Diamondbacks (1998–1999) Scout; Arizona Diamondbacks (2000–2006) Scouting director; Washington Nationals (2007–2008) Assistant general manager; Washington Nationals (2009–2012) General manager; Washington Nationals (2013–2025) General manager / president of baseball operations

Career highlights and awards
- World Series champion (2019)

Michael Anthony Rizzo (born December 14, 1960) is an American professional baseball executive who until 2025 served as the general manager and president of baseball operations of the Washington Nationals of Major League Baseball (MLB).

After a brief playing career in minor league baseball, Rizzo transitioned into coaching and scouting. He became the director of scouting for the Arizona Diamondbacks in 2000. Rizzo joined the Nationals in 2006 as an assistant general manager. He succeeded Jim Bowden as the Nationals' general manager in 2009, and was promoted to team president in 2013. Rizzo and the Nationals won the franchise's first World Series in 2019, defeating the Houston Astros in seven games.

== Early life ==
Rizzo, a third-generation scout, grew up in west suburban Chicago as one of four children to Phil and Bernadine Rizzo. His father, Phil, was a former minor league baseball player who drove a truck for the city and scouted for the California Angels on a part-time basis. The Angels eventually made Phil a full-time scout. Many of the players he identified reached the majors. After 50 years in professional baseball, Phil was eventually part of the inaugural induction class that entered the Professional Baseball Scouts Hall of Fame in 2008. Phil continued his scouting career with the Nationals as a senior advisor to the GM until he died, on February 1, 2020. Mike Rizzo's grandfather, Vito, was a semi-pro player before founding the family business: scouting.

Rizzo attended Holy Cross High School in River Grove, Illinois, Triton College, and Saint Xavier University, where he played college baseball for the Triton Trojans and Saint Xavier Cougars.

== Early career ==
The Angels drafted Rizzo in the 22nd round, with the 554th overall selection, in the 1982 Major League Baseball draft. He played for the Salem Angels (Class A Short Season), Peoria Suns (Class A) and Redwood Pioneers (Class A Advanced) from 1982 to 1984. After the 1984 season, the Angels released Rizzo. His father suggested that he was not skilled enough to reach the major leagues, and advised he attend college.

Rizzo became an assistant coach at the University of Illinois while earning a Bachelor of Arts in Communications in 1988. Larry Himes, the scout who drafted Rizzo, became the general manager of the Chicago White Sox, and he hired Rizzo as a scout for the Upper Midwest region. While with the White Sox, Rizzo signed 2014 Hall of Fame inductee and two-time American League MVP Frank Thomas. He also scouted for the Boston Red Sox. Rizzo joined the Arizona Diamondbacks when the franchise was created in 1998, and served as the director of scouting for the Diamondbacks from 2000 to 2006. He helped transform the Diamondbacks farm system with exceptionally successful drafts. Following the 2005 campaign, Rizzo was promoted to Vice President of Scouting Operations. That same year, the Diamondbacks were named Topps' Organization of the Year. Rizzo earned a World Series ring with Arizona in 2001, and the organization brought many homegrown players through to the major leagues during his tenure. Brandon Webb (2006 Cy Young Award winner), Carlos Gonzalez, Chad Tracy, Justin Upton, Stephen Drew, Dan Uggla, Micah Owings, Mark Reynolds, Conor Jackson, Miguel Montero, Chris Snyder, Carlos Quentin, Max Scherzer, and Brett Anderson were all signed by Arizona under Rizzo's watch.

== Washington Nationals ==
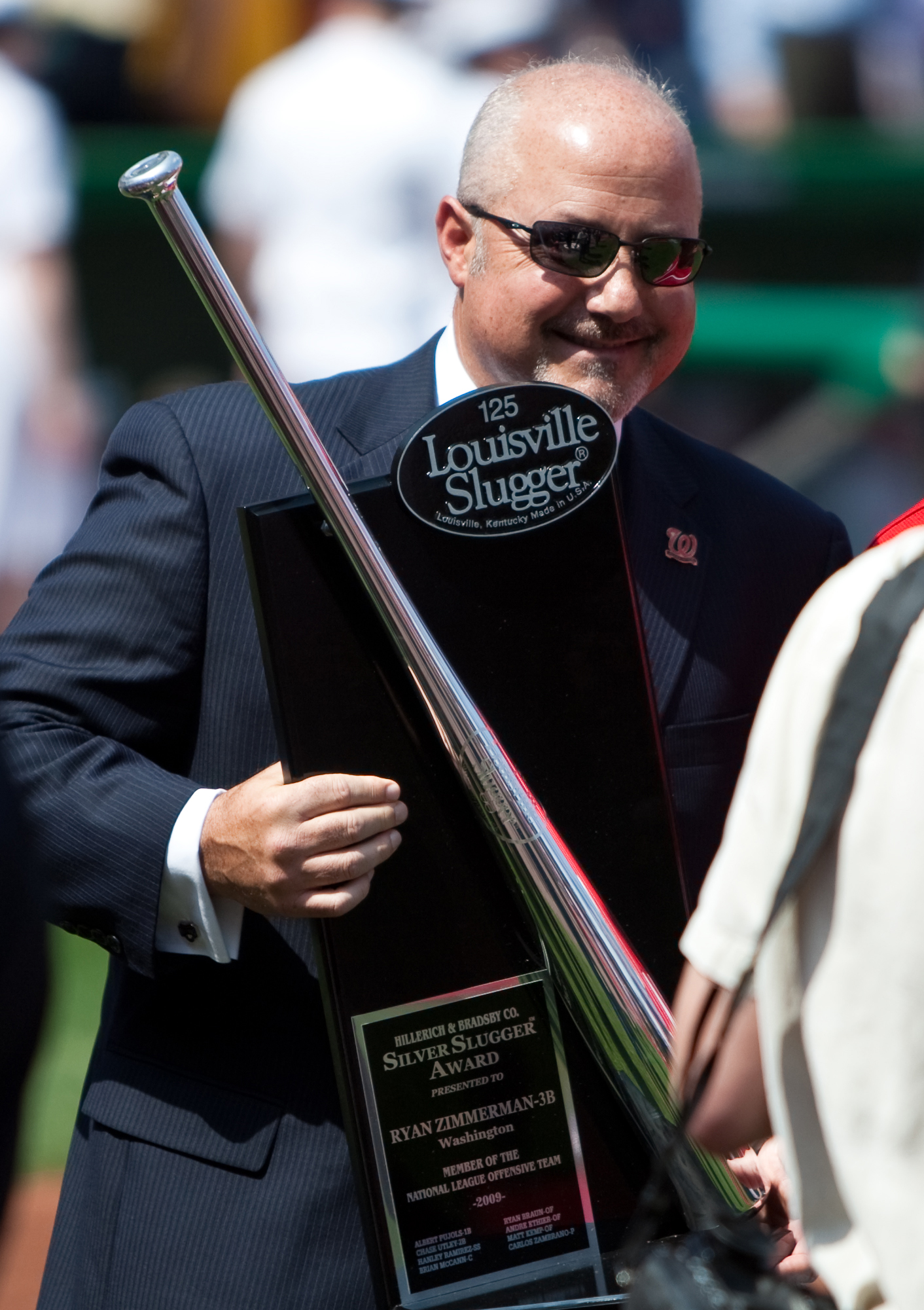
Mike Rizzo, General Manager of the Washington Nationals presents the Silver Slugger Award to Ryan Zimmerman in 2010.

Seeking to replace Joe Garagiola Jr. as the Diamondbacks' general manager, the team chose Josh Byrnes over Rizzo. As a result, Rizzo joined the Washington Nationals organization, when he was appointed assistant general manager and vice president of baseball operations by Jim Bowden on July 24, 2006. This move coincided with the franchise's ownership transfer from Major League Baseball to a Washington, D.C.-based investment group headed by Ted Lerner.

Three days after Bowden's sudden resignation on March 1, 2009, Rizzo was promoted to general manager on an interim basis by team president Stan Kasten. He was named the full-time senior vice president and general manager on August 20, 2009. On October 19, 2010, Rizzo signed a five-year contract extension and was promoted to executive vice president of baseball operations and general manager. The last two years of this contract were club options.

On June 24, 2021, at Miami, the Nationals beat the Marlins, 7–3, marking Rizzo's 1,000th win as general manager since taking over the club during 2009 Spring Training. In doing so, he became the ninth active president of baseball operations and general manager to reach the 1,000 win mark and the sixth active to do it with one team.

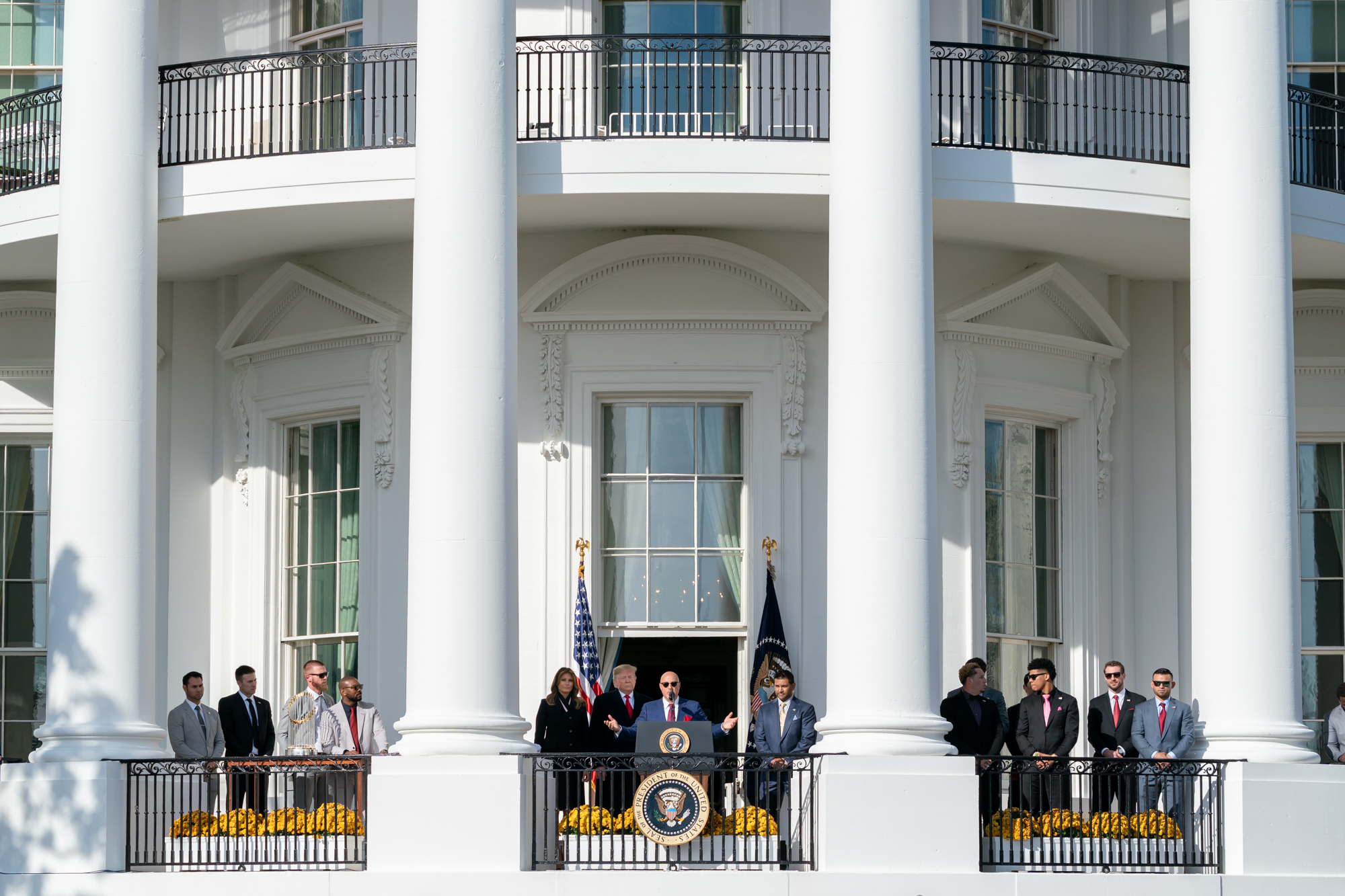
Mike Rizzo delivers remarks at the White House during the celebration for the 2019 World Series Champions in Nov 2019.

The Nationals have had success under Rizzo, winning a World Series in 2019 and four National League East titles (2012, 2014, 2016, 2017) during his tenure. In April 2022, Rizzo was inducted into the Triton College Alumni Wall of Fame. In December 2021, he was named the Italian American Baseball Foundation Executive of the Year. After winning the World Series in 2019, he was named Executive of the Year by Baseball America and the Boston Chapter of the BBWAA. The Boston Chapter of the BBWAA also honored him with the same award following the 2012 season. He also garnered Executive of the Year honors in 2012 from the Pitch and Hit Club of Chicago, which followed 2011 Man of the Year honors from the Lido Civic Club of Washington, D.C.

In November of 2009, Rizzo convinced Davey Johnson to sign on as senior advisor and help revamp the Nationals' on-field operations. In June of 2011, Rizzo appointed him field manager and Johnson led the team to its first playoff appearance and through the 2013 season. On December 5, 2010, Rizzo signed right fielder Jayson Werth to a seven-year contract that immediately changed the perception of the Nationals. One year later, Rizzo signed franchise cornerstone Ryan Zimmerman, to a six-year contract extension. From 2009 to 2012 Rizzo's Nationals won at least 10 more games than the season prior: 59 wins in 2009, 69 in 2010, 80 in 2011, 98 in 2012. The last team to do this was the Boston Red Sox from 1906 to 1909, making the Nationals the first team in over 100 years to complete such a feat without the benefit of an artificially deflated win total associated with a work stoppage. Rizzo shut down ace pitcher Stephen Strasburg late in the 2012 season as he recovered from Tommy John surgery from the year before. The Nationals promoted Rizzo to president of baseball operations during the 2013 season.

To strengthen the rotation before the 2015 season, Rizzo signed ace pitcher Max Scherzer to a seven-year contract, introducing him on January 21, 2015. In December 2015, Rizzo pulled off a three-team trade that netted shortstop Trea Turner and right-handed pitcher Joe Ross from the San Diego Padres and sent outfielder Steven Souza Jr. to the Tampa Bay Rays. With the 2016 Baseball Winter Meetings taking place at nearby National Harbor, Md., Rizzo acquired outfielder Adam Eaton from the White Sox in exchange for prospects Lucas Giolito, Reynaldo Lopez and Dane Dunning. In 2016, the team picked up its option to extend Rizzo's contract through the 2018 season.

With Washington ahead in the division by nearly 10 games following the 2017 All-Star break, Rizzo got a jump on the trade market on July 16, fortifying Washington's bullpen by acquiring relievers Sean Doolittle and Ryan Madson from the Oakland Athletics. On July 28, he acquired veteran position player Howie Kendrick from the Philadelphia Phillies. Moments before the July 31 deadline, Rizzo further added to the bullpen with the acquisition of Minnesota Twins reliever Brandon Kintzler. On April 5, 2018, Rizzo signed a contract extension through the 2020 season. When Kendrick went down with an Achilles injury on May 19, 2018, Rizzo promoted 19-year-old outfield prospect Juan Soto to the Major Leagues.

After 11 seasons as the head of Washington's baseball operations, Rizzo's team won the 2019 World Series, defeating the Houston Astros in seven games. Rizzo's contract was then extended through 2023, giving him a raise above his $4 million per year salary.

In a span of roughly 26 hours from July 29–30, 2021, Rizzo and the Washington Nationals acquired 12 players via six trades around the trade deadline. Those 12 players included Josiah Gray, Keibert Ruiz, Riley Adams, Mason Thompson, Gerardo Carrillo, and Donovan Casey, among others. Other notable contributors Rizzo has brought in via trade during his tenure include Nelson Cruz, Josh Bell, Gio Gonzalez, Tanner Roark, Blake Treinen, Mark Melancon, Wilson Ramos, Denard Span, Kurt Suzuki, Michael Morse, and Sean Burnett, among others.

On July 2, 2022, the Nationals exercised Rizzo's option for the 2023 season.

After a 37–53 start to the 2025 season, Rizzo was fired by the Nationals on July 6, 2025, after 19 seasons with the organization. The firing came alongside manager Dave Martinez, who was also relieved of his duties after eight seasons with the team. Under Rizzo, the Nationals made five playoff appearances, won four division titles, one National League pennant, and one World Series title. However, at the time of Rizzo's firing, the Nationals had not achieved a winning season since their World Series run in 2019.

== Personal life ==
Rizzo lives in Washington, D.C., with his wife, Jodi Fick Rizzo. The couple married in November 2019. Their son, Sonny, was born in January 2023. They also have a dog named Hayes. Rizzo has a son, Michael Jr., born around the early 1990s, from a prior relationship. Mike Jr. is an entrepreneur living in San Diego, California.
