= 2019 World Series =

115th edition of Major League Baseball's championship series

Team (Wins)	Managers	Season
Washington Nationals (4)	Dave Martinez	93–69 (.574), GB: 4
Houston Astros (3)	A. J. Hinch	107–55 (.660), GA: 10
- Dates: October 22–30
- Venue(s): Minute Maid Park (Houston); Nationals Park (Washington)
- MVP: Stephen Strasburg (Washington)
- Umpires: Alan Porter (Games 1–2), (Note: During the postseason, there are seven umpires to a crew. One umpire is designated as the replay official and is assigned to MLB's New York office with replay officials for the first two games of the series. At the first travel day, the replay official umpire is assigned to the field for the remainder of the series while another umpire is designated the replay official. Wolf was the replay official for Games 1 and 2, while Porter was the replay official for the remaining games.) Doug Eddings, Gary Cederstrom (crew chief), James Hoye, Lance Barksdale, Sam Holbrook, Jim Wolf (Games 3–7)

Broadcast
- Television: Fox (United States – English); Fox Deportes (United States – Spanish); MLB International (International – English)
- TV announcers: Joe Buck, John Smoltz, Ken Rosenthal and Tom Verducci (Fox); Rolando Nichols, Edgar Gonzalez and Carlos Álvarez (Fox Deportes); Matt Vasgersian and Buck Martinez (MLB International)
- Radio: ESPN (English); Unanimo Deportes (Spanish); WJFK-FM (WAS); KBME (HOU)
- Radio announcers: Dan Shulman, Chris Singleton and Buster Olney (ESPN); Beto Ferreiro and Orlando Hernández (Unanimo Deportes); Charlie Slowes and Dave Jageler (WJFK); Robert Ford and Steve Sparks (KBME)
- ALCS: Houston Astros over New York Yankees (4–2)
- NLCS: Washington Nationals over St. Louis Cardinals (4–0)

The 2019 World Series was the championship series of Major League Baseball's (MLB) 2019 season. The 115th edition of the World Series, it was a best-of-seven playoff between the American League (AL) champion Houston Astros and the National League (NL) champion Washington Nationals. The series was played from October 22 to October 30. Washington upset the favored Astros, four games to three, to secure its first title in franchise history and first in the capital city since the 1924 series. Washington pitcher Stephen Strasburg was named the World Series Most Valuable Player (MVP) after earning two wins in the series.

The Astros had home-field advantage because they had the better regular-season record. It was the third World Series in which home-field advantage was decided by the regular-season records of the American and National league champions, a practice that started in the 2017 Major League Baseball season. It was the first World Series in which the Houston Astros had home-field advantage. (Note: In the previous championship series the Astros contested, the 2005 White Sox and the 2017 Dodgers had home-field advantage.) The series was played in a 2–3–2 format, with the Astros hosting Games 1, 2, 6, and 7; and the Nationals hosting Games 3, 4, and 5.

For the first time in any of the major North American sports leagues, the visiting team won all the games of a seven-game championship series, surpassing the previous high of five. The road team outscored the home team 49–14 in the seven games played. Washington won despite scoring only three runs at home. It was the sixth straight World Series in which the visiting team clinched the championship and the fourth consecutive seventh game of a Series won by the visiting team.

With the Nationals being from the National League East, this marked the sixth World Series in a row to have been won by teams from separate divisions in Major League Baseball. (Note: The 2019 Nationals, 2018 Red Sox, 2017 Astros, 2016 Cubs, 2015 Royals, and 2014 Giants represent all six of MLB’s divisions.)

For the third straight year, MLB sold presenting sponsorships to all of postseason series. As with the 2017 and 2018 World Series, this World Series was sponsored by YouTube TV and was officially known as the 2019 World Series presented by YouTube TV.

== Background ==
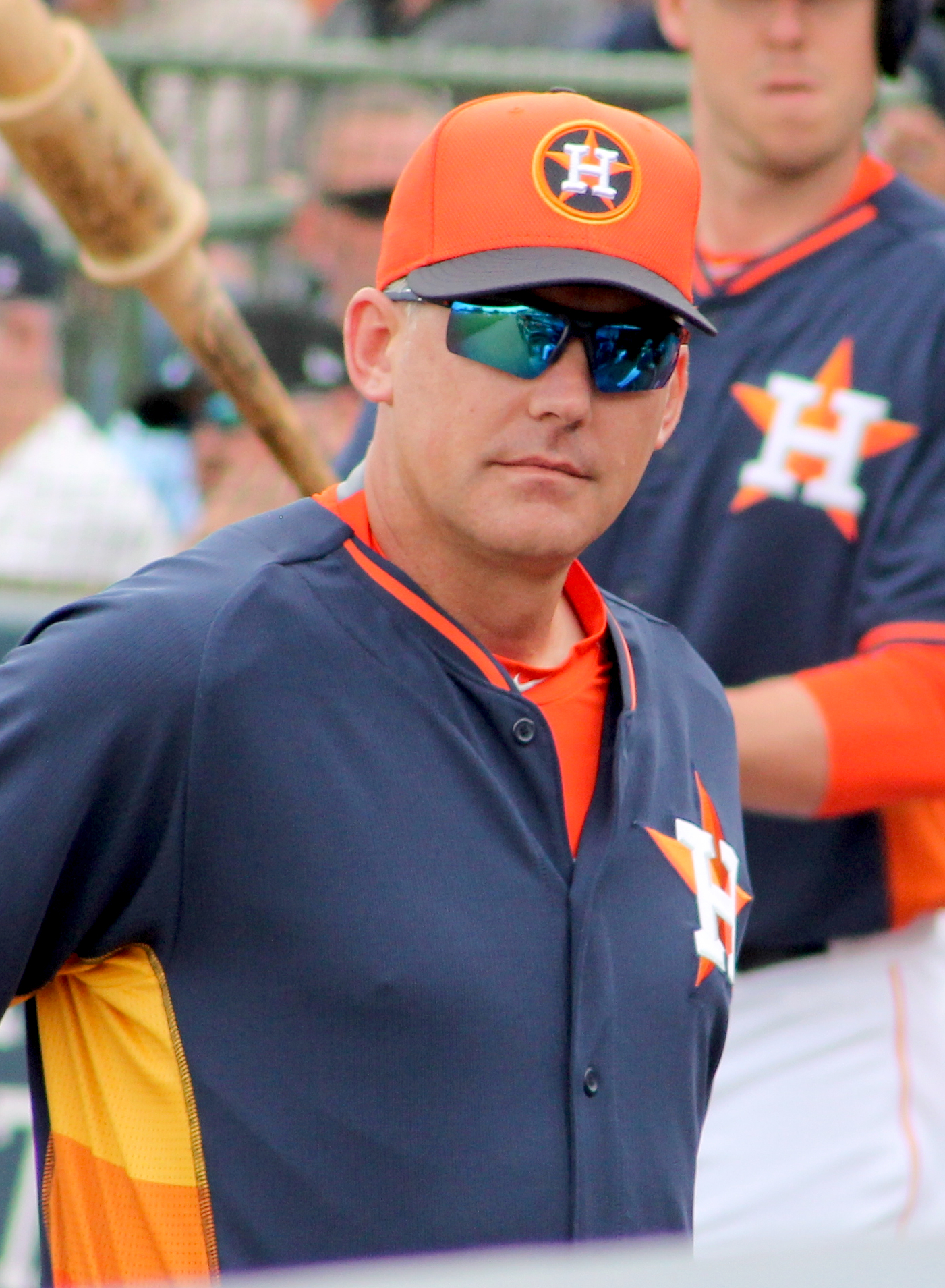
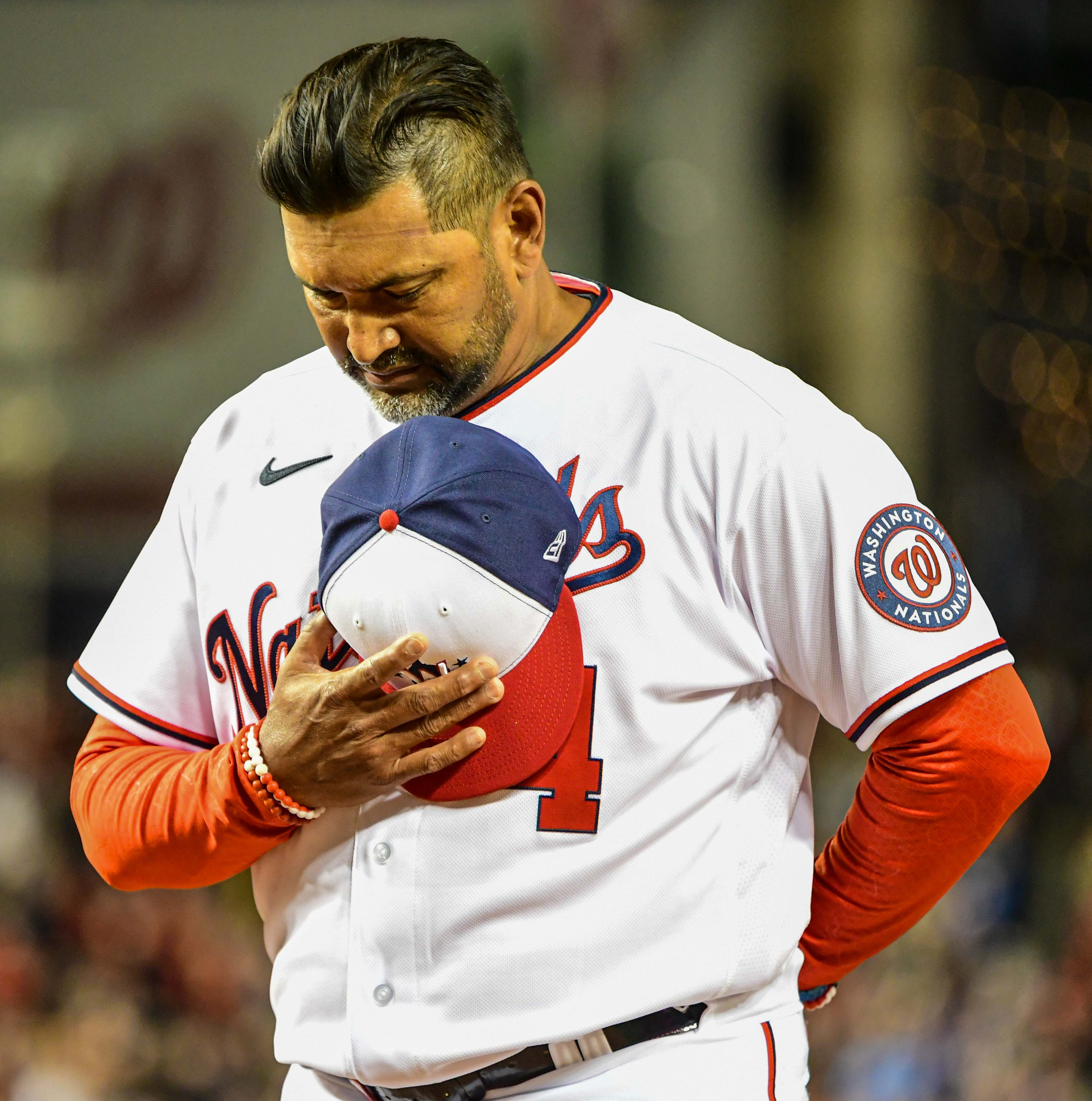
Managers A. J. Hinch (left) and Dave Martinez (right)

This was the first World Series appearance for the franchise that began its existence as the Montreal Expos in 1969, and moved to Washington, D.C. in 2005 to become the Nationals. The Nationals were also the last team from the 1969 expansion class (which also included the Kansas City Royals, Milwaukee Brewers—who began as the Seattle Pilots—and San Diego Padres) to earn a trip to the series. Also, after their World Series appearance, all National League (NL) teams had played in at least one World Series. The only American League (AL) team that has yet to play in a World Series is the Seattle Mariners, who were part of the 1977 expansion. Prior to this series, the Astros and Nationals had never played each other in a postseason series, even though Houston played in the NL from 1962 to 2012 before moving to the AL West in 2013. In fact, the Nationals are the only team the Astros have faced in the World Series that they have never faced in a pre-World Series playoff round, since the Astros have faced the White Sox, Dodgers, and Braves during at least one playoff round prior to the World Series. The Astros and Nationals did not play an interleague game in 2019, and last faced each other during the 2017 regular season. The two teams share a spring training site in West Palm Beach, Florida, and opened the 2019 spring training schedule against each other. This was the second World Series to feature two expansion teams, the first being in 2015 between the Kansas City Royals and the New York Mets. (Note: The Astros entered the NL as the Houston Colt .45s in 1962, acquiring their current name in 1965 and moving to the AL in 2013; the Nationals entered the NL as the Montreal Expos in 1969, moving to Washington and acquiring their current name in 2005.) The Astros were deemed as heavy favorites to win the title.

=== Washington Nationals ===
The Nationals finished the 2018 season with an 82–80 (.506) win–loss record, and started the 2019 season with a 19–31 (.380) record. Second-year manager Dave Martinez began to receive public pressure to be fired by the Nationals. The team engineered a turnaround and finished the season in second place in the National League East, four games behind the Atlanta Braves, ending the year with a 93–69 (.574) record. The Nationals were one of two teams to qualify for the playoffs as a wild card team from the National League. Martinez had missed three games in September for a cardiac catheterization procedure to treat angina.

The fourth-seeded Nationals defeated the Milwaukee Brewers at home in the National League Wild Card Game, recovering from a 3–1 deficit in the eighth inning to win 4–3. The Nationals then upset the top-seeded Los Angeles Dodgers, who had won the previous two National League pennants, in the National League Division Series. The Nationals were behind two games to one, and won their second and third elimination games of the postseason to take the best-of-five series. The postseason series win was the first in Washington Nationals history. (Note: The franchise, then playing as the Montreal Expos, had one postseason series victory in the strike-shortened 1981 baseball season. That year, the postseason included an extra round, with the first half winner of each of two divisions in each league playing the second half division winner. Montreal won the second half Eastern Division title in the National League and beat the Philadelphia Phillies three games to two to advance to the National League Championship series, in which they lost to the Los Angeles Dodgers three games to two.) In the best-of-seven National League Championship Series, the Nationals swept the St. Louis Cardinals (who had defeated the Braves in the Division Series round) in four games to secure the first pennant in franchise history (including their time as the Montreal Expos from 1969 to 2004). It was the first World Series appearance for a team from Washington D.C. since 1933, including 33 seasons that the city did not host an MLB team (1972–2004).

=== Houston Astros ===
In the prior two seasons, the Astros had won the 2017 World Series, the franchise's first World Series championship, and lost the 2018 American League Championship Series to the Boston Red Sox. The Astros finished the 2019 regular season atop the American League West—their third consecutive division championship—with a 107–55 (.660) win–loss record. Their 107 wins were a franchise record, and the most in MLB for the season.

The Astros entered the postseason as the overall #1 seed. Their first opponent in the postseason was determined by the American League Wild Card Game, which saw the Tampa Bay Rays defeat the Oakland Athletics. In the best-of-five American League Division Series, the top-seeded Astros defeated fifth-seeded Tampa Bay in five games, with each game of the series being won by the home team. The Astros' opponent in the best-of-seven American League Championship Series (ALCS) was the second-seeded New York Yankees, who had defeated the Minnesota Twins in their playoff series, three games to none. In the ALCS, the Astros and Yankees split the first two games, followed by the Astros winning two-of-three games played at Yankee Stadium. Game 6 in Houston was then won by the Astros, giving them the series win, four games to two. The Astros' ALCS victory advanced them to their third overall World Series appearance (2 in the American League & one in the National League), and second in three years.

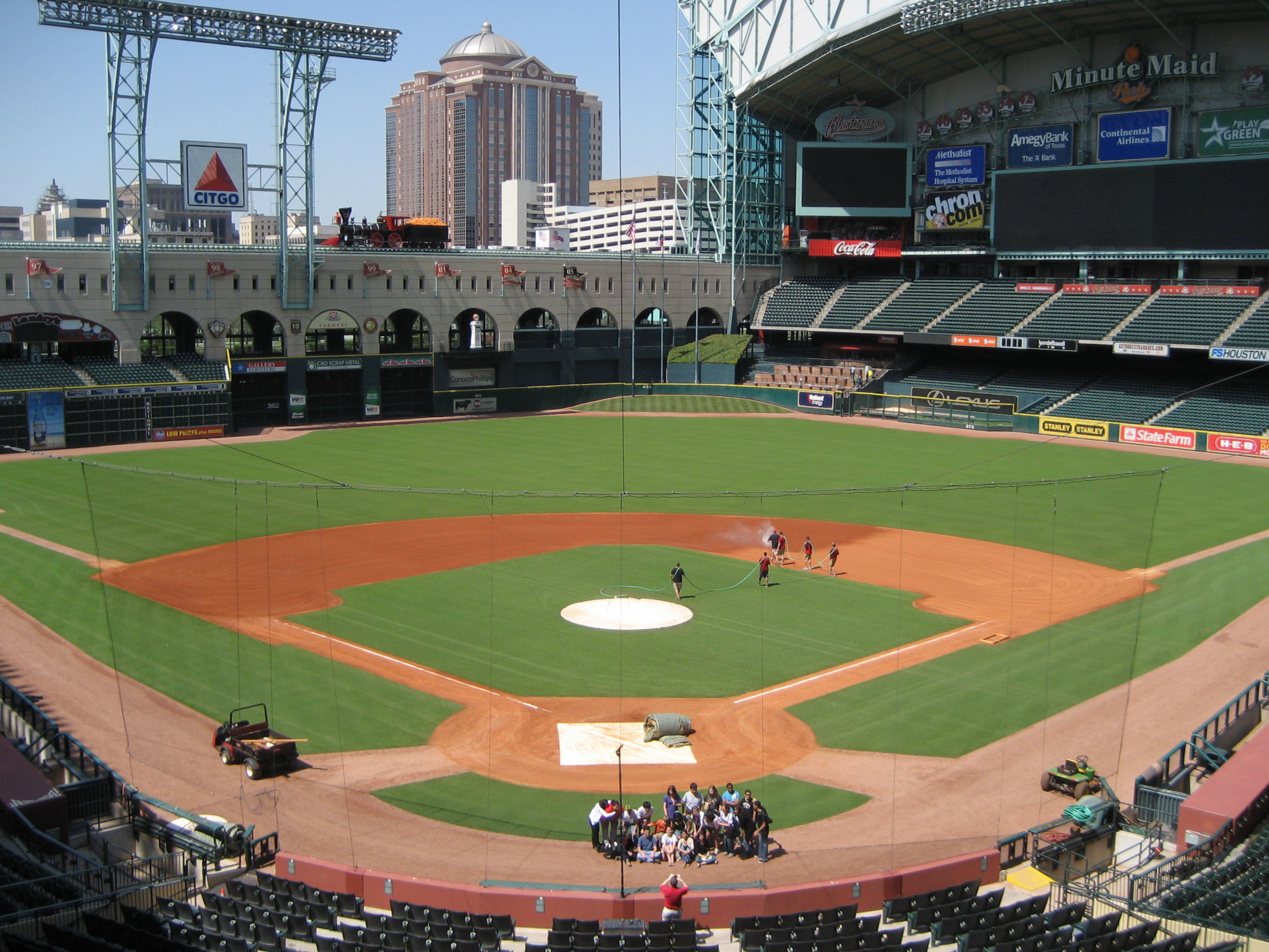
Minute Maid Park

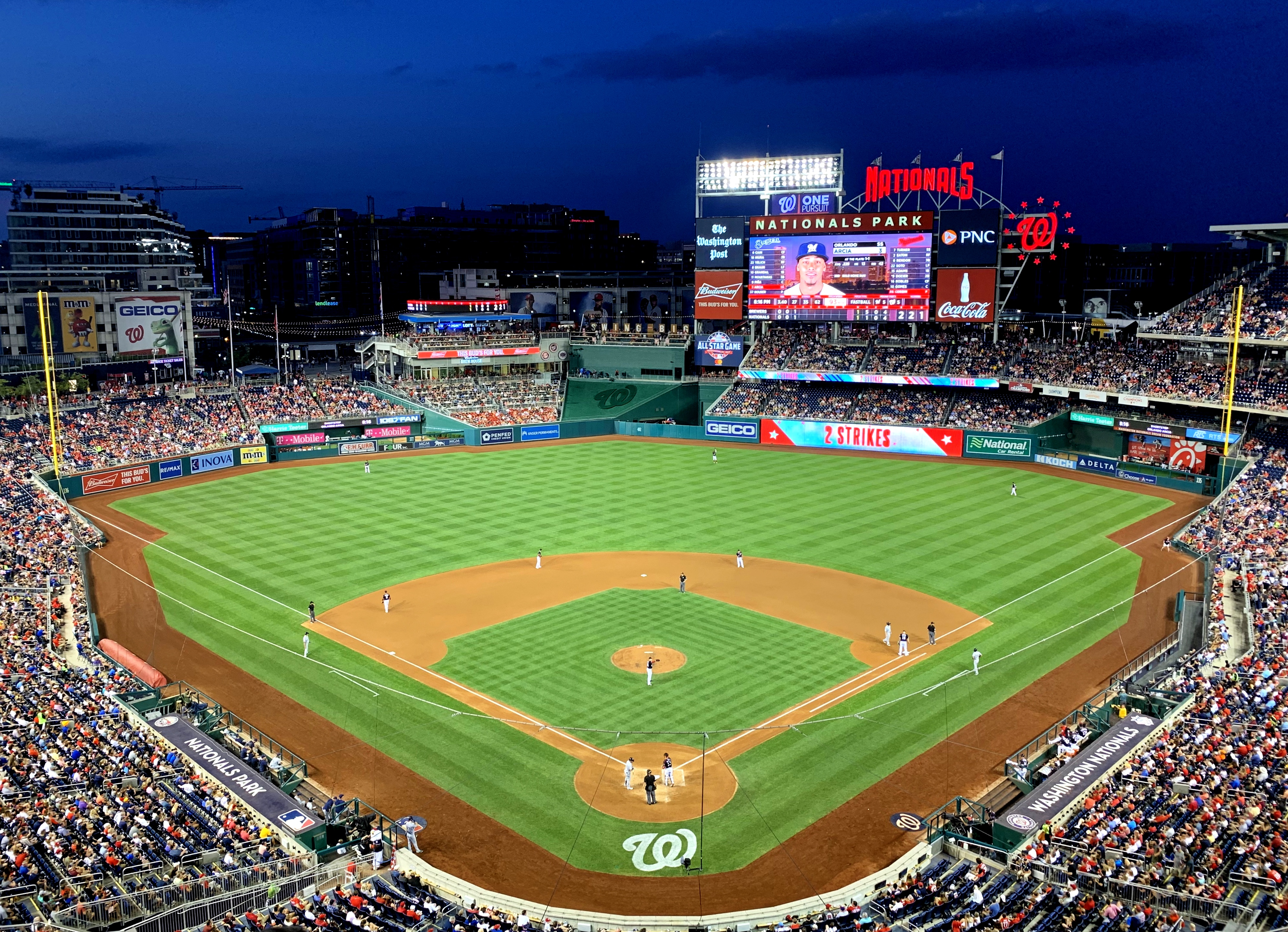
Nationals Park

== Summary ==
Washington won the series, 4–3.

Game	Date	Score	Location	Time	Attendance
1	October 22	Washington Nationals – 5, Houston Astros – 4	Minute Maid Park	3:43	43,339
2	October 23	Washington Nationals – 12, Houston Astros – 3	Minute Maid Park	4:01	43,357
3	October 25	Houston Astros – 4, Washington Nationals – 1	Nationals Park	4:03	43,867
4	October 26	Houston Astros – 8, Washington Nationals – 1	Nationals Park	3:48	43,889
5	October 27	Houston Astros – 7, Washington Nationals – 1	Nationals Park	3:19	43,910
6	October 29	Washington Nationals – 7, Houston Astros – 2	Minute Maid Park	3:37	43,384
7	October 30	Washington Nationals – 6, Houston Astros – 2	Minute Maid Park	3:42	43,326

== Matchups ==
=== Game 1 ===
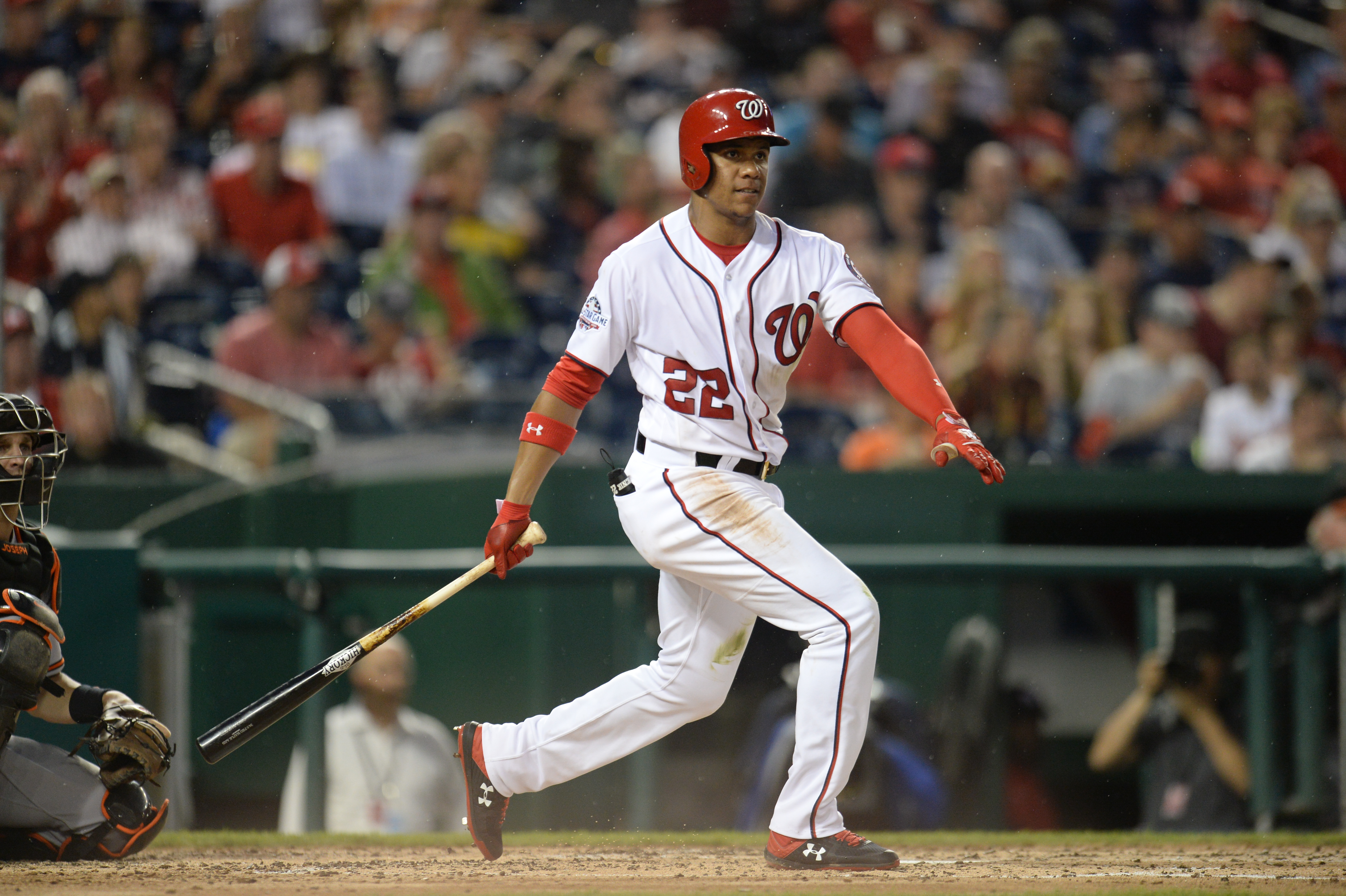
Juan Soto batted 3-for-4 with three RBIs in Game 1.

October 22, 2019 7:10 pm (CDT) at Minute Maid Park in Houston, Texas, 73 °F (23 °C), roof closed
Team	1	2	3	4	5	6	7	8	9	R	H	E
Washington	0	1	0	1	3	0	0	0	0	5	9	0
Houston	2	0	0	0	0	0	1	1	0	4	10	0
WP: Max Scherzer (1–0) LP: Gerrit Cole (0–1) Sv: Sean Doolittle (1); Home runs: WAS: Ryan Zimmerman (1), Juan Soto (1); HOU: George Springer (1); Attendance: 43,339; Boxscore

Before the national anthem sung by Nicole Scherzinger, a moment of silence took place in honor of umpire Eric Cooper, who had died on October 20. Former Astro Brian McCann threw out the ceremonial first pitch to former teammate Evan Gattis. Max Scherzer started for the Nationals, while Gerrit Cole started for the Astros. With two outs in the bottom of the first inning, (Note: The "bottom" of an inning refers to when the home team bats, as the home team's runs are listed below the visiting team's runs in the linescore.) Yuli Gurriel hit a two-run double, giving the Astros a 2–0 lead. In the top of the second inning, (Note: The "top" of an inning refers to when the visiting team bats, as the visiting team's runs are listed above the home team's runs in the linescore.) Ryan Zimmerman hit a home run to cut the Astros' lead to 2–1. Juan Soto led off the top of the fourth inning with a home run to tie the game, 2–2. Soto became the fourth-youngest player to hit a home run in a World Series; Andruw Jones in 1996 was the youngest to date. Adam Eaton batted in a run in the top of the fifth inning, followed two batters later by a Soto two-run double, giving the Nationals a 5–2 lead.

Scherzer exited after pitching five innings, having allowed two runs on five hits while striking out seven batters. Cole went seven innings, allowing five runs on eight hits while striking out six. After Nationals pitcher Patrick Corbin pitched a scoreless sixth, George Springer led off the bottom of the seventh inning with the 14th postseason home run of his career, off Nats relief pitcher Tanner Rainey. He also broke a World Series record held by Reggie Jackson and Lou Gehrig, with a home run in five consecutive World Series games, dating back to Game 4 of the 2017 World Series. The Astros loaded the bases later in the inning with two walks off Rainey and an infield single off Daniel Hudson, but Hudson struck out Yordan Alvarez to prevent any more scoring. In the bottom of the eighth inning, pinch hitter Kyle Tucker singled, advanced to second on a fly ball by Aledmys Díaz, and Springer batted in another run with a double, pulling the Astros to within one run, 5–4. Sean Doolittle, the Nationals' fifth pitcher of the game, got the final out of the eighth inning and retired the side in order in the bottom of the ninth, concluding matters when Carlos Correa lined out to Víctor Robles to preserve the win. Doolittle earned his second save of the postseason and the underdogs took the series lead, marking the first time in franchise history that the Nationals won a World Series game.

=== Game 2 ===
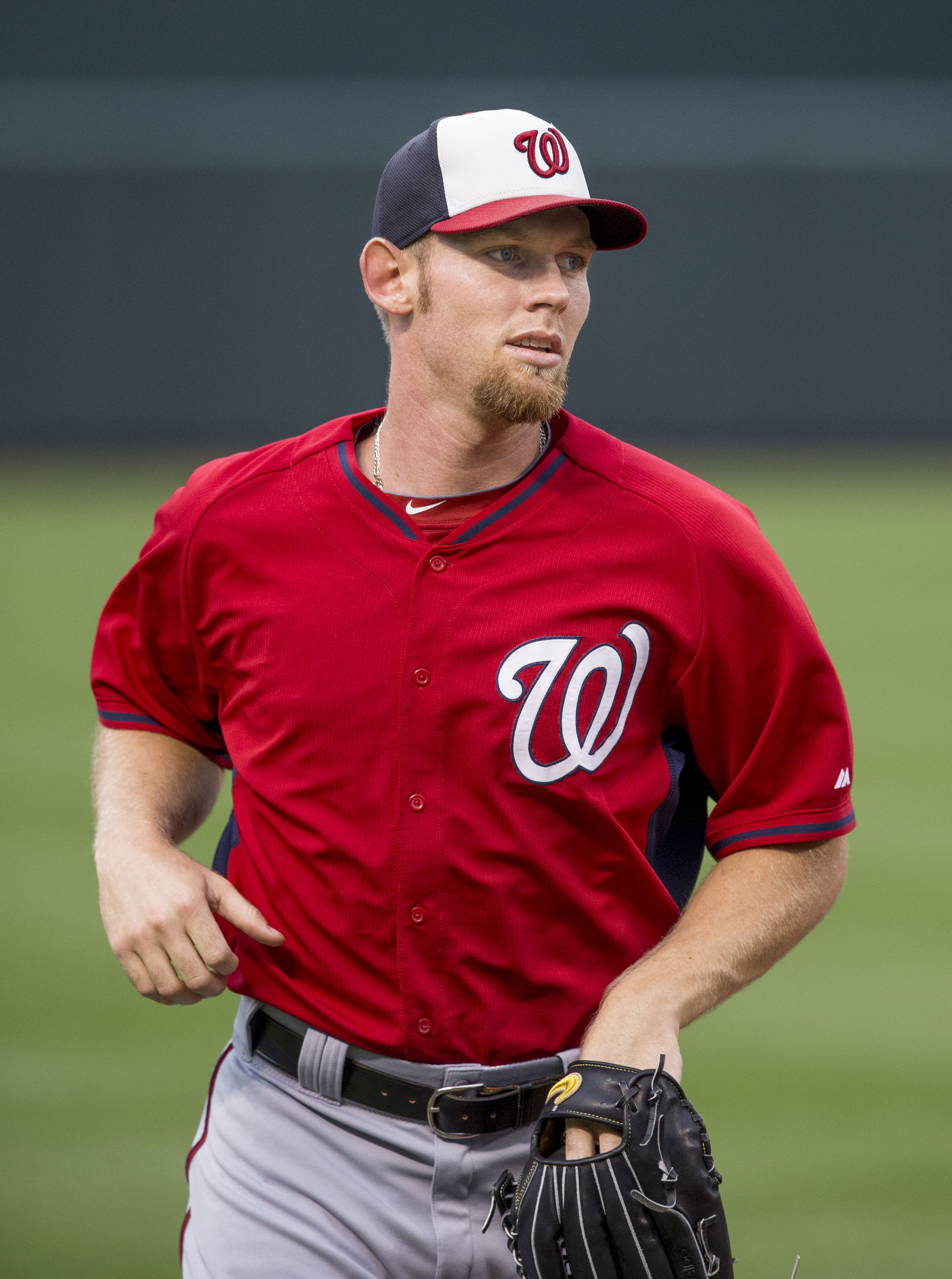
Stephen Strasburg earned the win in Game 2.

October 23, 2019 7:08 pm (CDT) at Minute Maid Park in Houston, Texas, 73 °F (23 °C), roof closed
Team	1	2	3	4	5	6	7	8	9	R	H	E
Washington	2	0	0	0	0	0	6	3	1	12	14	2
Houston	2	0	0	0	0	0	0	0	1	3	9	1
WP: Stephen Strasburg (1–0) LP: Justin Verlander (0–1); Home runs: WAS: Kurt Suzuki (1), Adam Eaton (1), Michael A. Taylor (1); HOU: Alex Bregman (1), Martín Maldonado (1); Attendance: 43,357; Boxscore

Gymnast and Houston native Simone Biles threw out the ceremonial first pitch of Game 2. The starting pitchers were Stephen Strasburg for the Nationals and Justin Verlander for the Astros. After a walk and a single to start the game, Anthony Rendon batted in two runs with a double. Alex Bregman tied the game with a two-run home run in the bottom of the first. In the top of the second inning, Verlander recorded the 200th postseason strikeout of his career, surpassing John Smoltz (whose career spanned 1988–2009) and setting a new MLB record.

Leading off the top of the seventh, Kurt Suzuki hit a home run to put the Nationals ahead, 3–2. Verlander exited one batter later; he was charged with four runs on seven hits while striking out six batters, and was later assessed the loss. Washington scored five more runs in the seventh off Ryan Pressly, extending their lead to 8–2. With a six-run lead, Strasburg was removed before the bottom of the seventh, having held the Astros to two runs on seven hits while striking out seven. In the eighth inning, a two-run home run by Adam Eaton plus a run batted in (RBI) by Asdrúbal Cabrera extended the Nationals' lead to nine runs. A ninth-inning home run by Michael A. Taylor off Chris Devenski pushed the lead to 12–2. Astro Martín Maldonado hit a home run in the bottom of the ninth off relief pitcher Javy Guerra, but there was no further scoring as the Nationals completed their eighth consecutive playoff win.

=== Game 3 ===
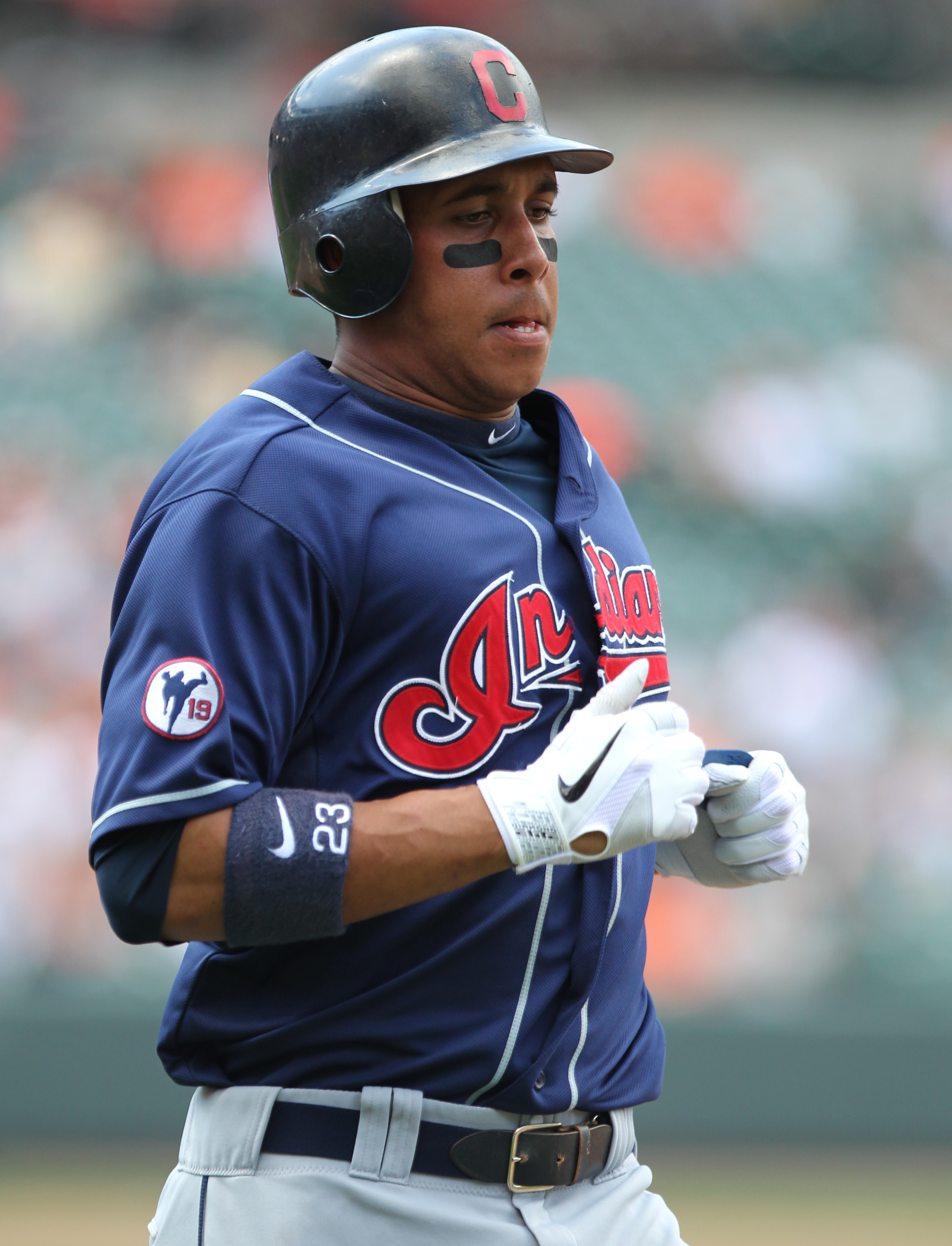
Michael Brantley was 2-for-4 with two RBIs in Game 3.

October 25, 2019 8:07 pm (EDT) at Nationals Park in Washington, D.C., 64 °F (18 °C), partly cloudy
Team	1	2	3	4	5	6	7	8	9	R	H	E
Houston	0	1	1	0	1	1	0	0	0	4	11	0
Washington	0	0	0	1	0	0	0	0	0	1	9	2
WP: Josh James (1–0) LP: Aníbal Sánchez (0–1) Sv: Roberto Osuna (1); Home runs: HOU: Robinson Chirinos (1); WAS: None; Attendance: 43,867; Boxscore

This was the first World Series game played in Washington D.C. since October 7, 1933, which was the clinching Game 5 of the New York Giants' win over the Washington Senators. Chad Cordero of the 2005 Nationals threw out the ceremonial first pitch to former teammate Brian Schneider; former astronaut Buzz Aldrin also threw a ceremonial pitch. Aníbal Sánchez started for the Nationals, while Zack Greinke started for the Astros. In the second inning, Josh Reddick batted in Carlos Correa as Houston scored the game's first run. In the third inning, Jose Altuve doubled and advanced to third on an error, then scored on an infield single by Michael Brantley, giving the Astros a 2–0 lead. The Nationals loaded the bases with two outs in the bottom of the third, but were unable to score. In the bottom of the fourth, Ryan Zimmerman walked then was driven in by a triple by Víctor Robles, cutting the Astros' lead to 2–1.

Houston restored its two-run lead in the top of the fifth, as Altuve doubled and was then batted in by Brantley. Greinke left with two outs in the bottom of the fifth, having allowed one run on seven hits while striking out six batters. The Astros extended their lead to 4–1 in the top of the sixth, as Robinson Chirinos hit a home run off the left field foul pole netting. Sánchez lasted until one out in the top of the sixth, having allowed four runs on 10 hits while striking out four. With no additional scoring through the middle of the ninth, the Astros brought in closer Roberto Osuna to pitch the bottom of the ninth. Osuna allowed a one-out single to Adam Eaton, but otherwise retired the Nationals; Juan Soto struck out looking to end the Nationals’ eight-game playoff winning streak. Osuna earned his second save this postseason, as Houston narrowed Washington's lead in the series to 2–1. This became the first World Series to begin with three games won by the road team since 1996, when the first five games were won by the road team.

=== Game 4 ===
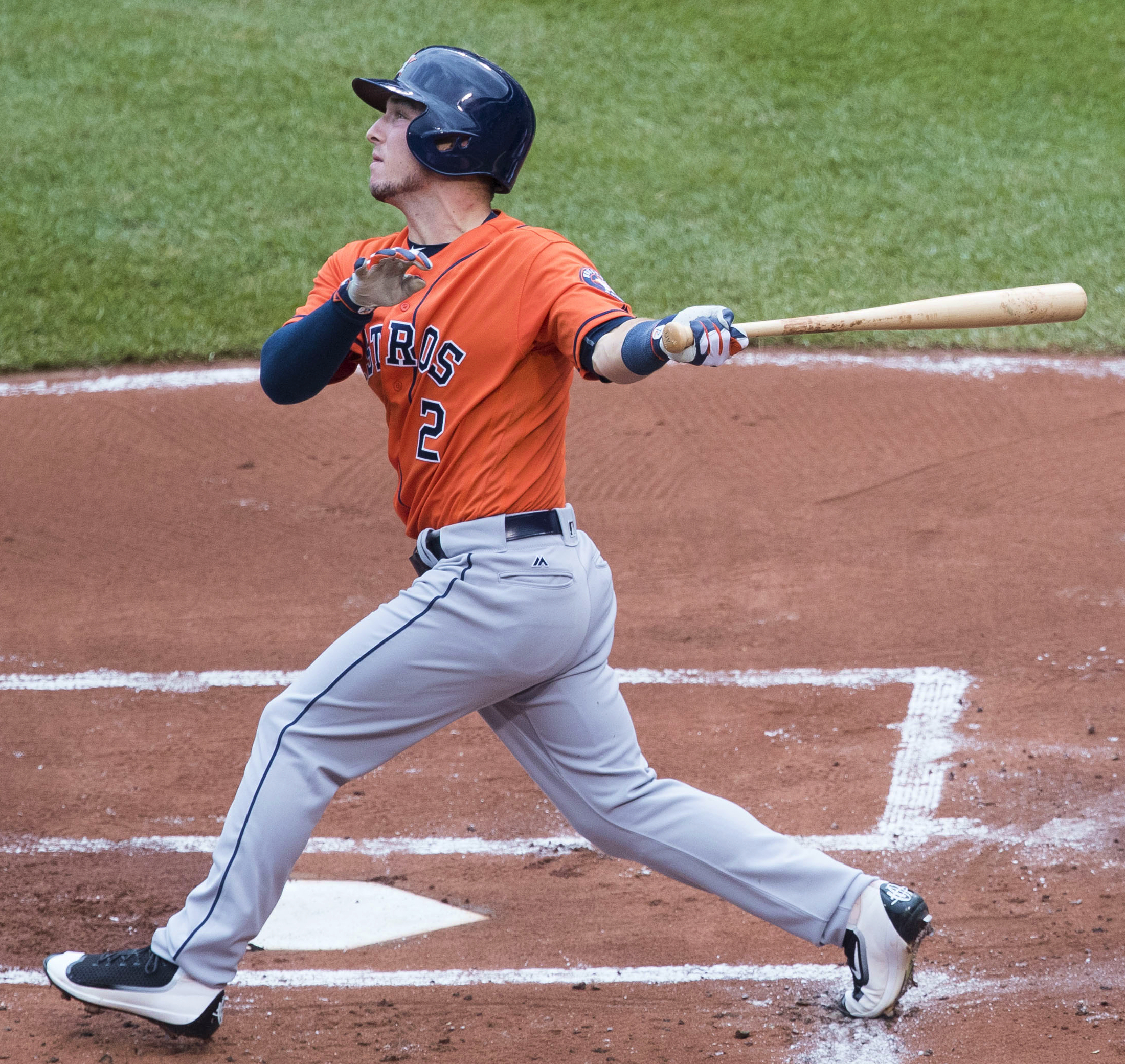
Alex Bregman had five RBIs in Game 4, four on a grand slam.

October 26, 2019 8:08 pm (EDT) at Nationals Park in Washington, D.C., 63 °F (17 °C), overcast
Team	1	2	3	4	5	6	7	8	9	R	H	E
Houston	2	0	0	2	0	0	4	0	0	8	13	1
Washington	0	0	0	0	0	1	0	0	0	1	4	0
WP: José Urquidy (1–0) LP: Patrick Corbin (0–1); Home runs: HOU: Robinson Chirinos (2), Alex Bregman (2); WAS: None; Attendance: 43,889; Boxscore

The ceremonial first pitch was thrown out by a Nationals Youth Baseball Academy scholar-athlete. Patrick Corbin started for the Nationals and José Urquidy started for the Astros. The Astros scored early, recording two runs in the first inning on four consecutive singles with one out. Robinson Chirinos hit a two-run home run in the fourth inning, extending Houston's lead to 4–0. Urquidy exited after five innings, having held the Nationals scoreless, retiring nine straight batters before being removed.

Washington scored a run in the bottom of the sixth, when Gerardo Parra scored on a Juan Soto ground out with the bases loaded and one out. Corbin pitched six innings, allowing four runs on seven hits while striking out five. After his exit, the Nationals bullpen allowed the bases to become loaded before a grand slam by Alex Bregman off Fernando Rodney in the seventh inning extended Houston's lead to 8–1. It was the 20th ever World Series grand slam and first since Addison Russell hit one in Game 6 of the 2016 World Series. With no further scoring, the Astros evened the series, 2–2, ensuring a sixth game in Houston. This was the fifth time a World Series started with the road team winning the first four games, the most recent occurrence having been 1996.

=== Game 5 ===
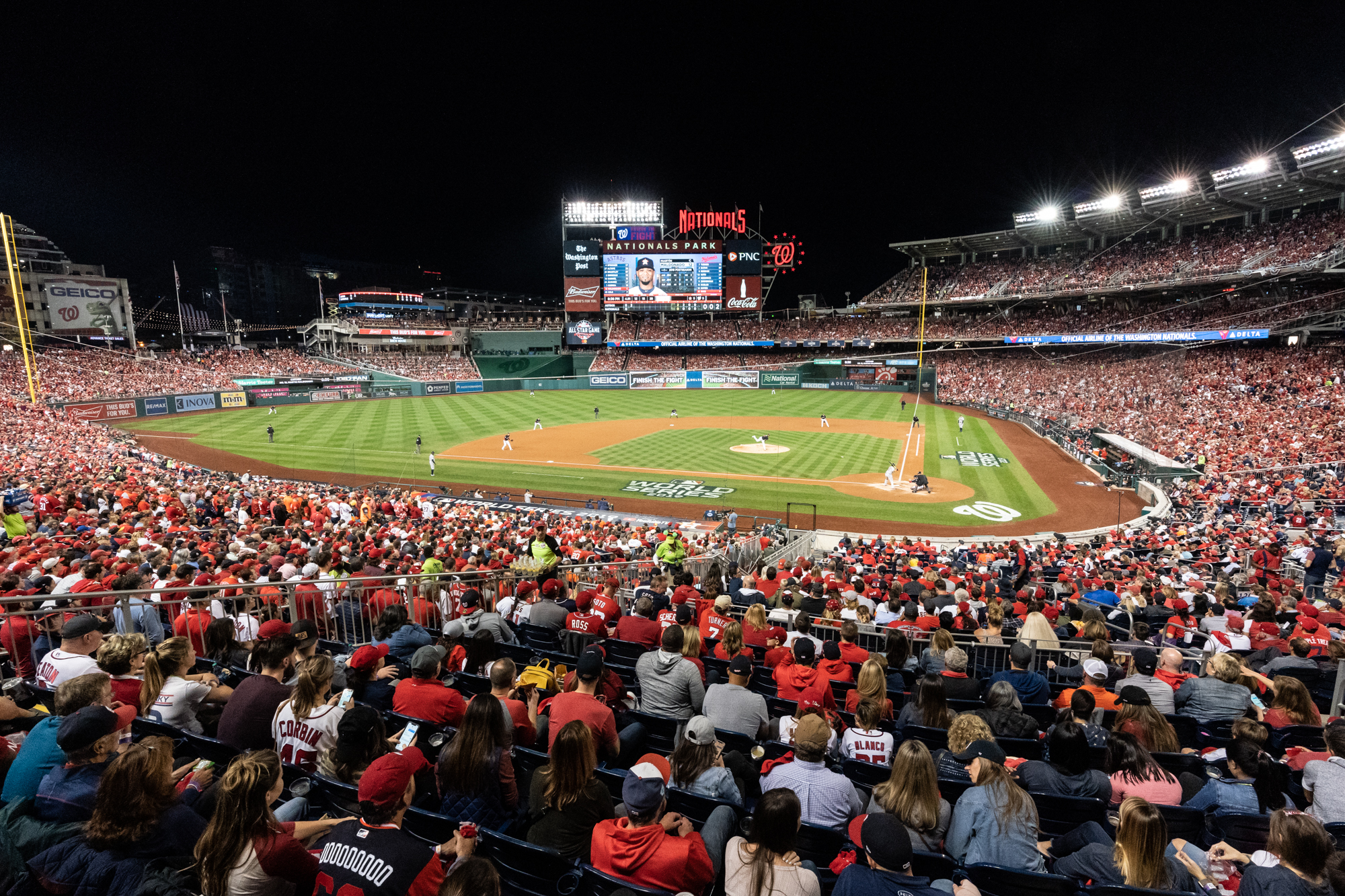
The Astros batting in the top of the 2nd inning of Game 5

October 27, 2019 8:08 pm (EDT) at Nationals Park in Washington, D.C., 72 °F (22 °C), clear
Team	1	2	3	4	5	6	7	8	9	R	H	E
Houston	0	2	0	2	0	0	0	1	2	7	10	0
Washington	0	0	0	0	0	0	1	0	0	1	4	0
WP: Gerrit Cole (1–1) LP: Joe Ross (0–1); Home runs: HOU: Yordan Alvarez (1), Carlos Correa (1), George Springer (2); WAS: Juan Soto (2); Attendance: 43,910; Boxscore

The ceremonial first pitch was thrown out by chef José Andrés. The starting pitchers were Gerrit Cole for Houston and Joe Ross for Washington. Max Scherzer was scheduled to start for Washington, but was scratched about three hours before the game for neck spasms.

A two-run home run by Yordan Alvarez in the top of the second inning gave the Astros an early lead. In the top of the fourth, Carlos Correa hit another two-run home run, extending Houston's lead to 4–0. Ross pitched for five innings, allowing four runs on five hits while striking out one batter. Juan Soto narrowed the lead to 4–1 with a home run in the bottom of the seventh. Yuli Gurriel batted in a run in the top of the eighth to restore the four-run lead. Cole left after seven innings, having held the Nationals to one run on three hits while striking out nine. George Springer's two-run home run in the top of the ninth stretched Houston's lead to 7–1. With Ryan Pressly ending the game by allowing no baserunners in the bottom of the ninth, the Astros moved to within a victory of their second title in three years. This became the third World Series—along with 1906 and 1996—to have the road team win the first five games.

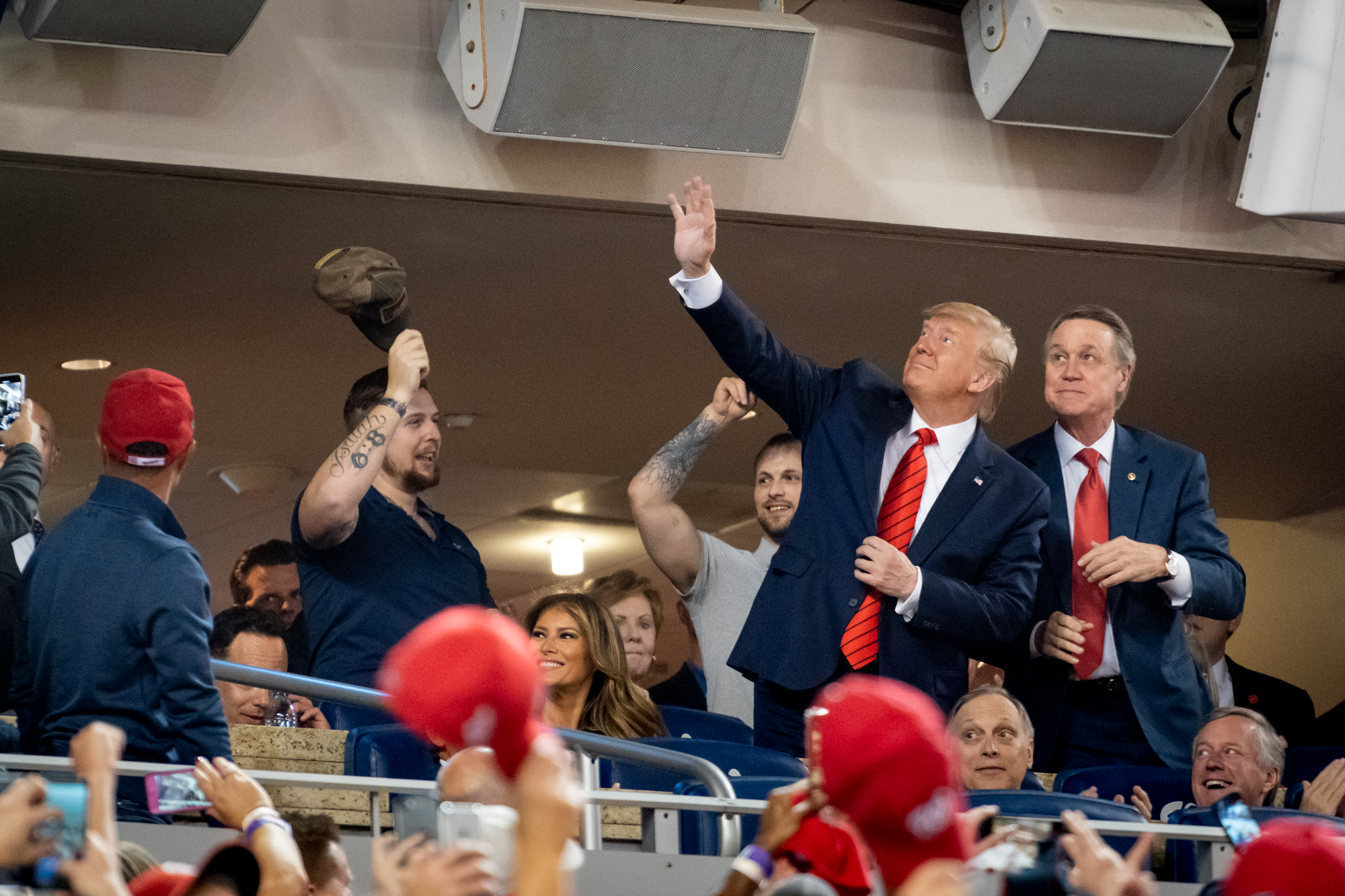
U.S. President Donald J. Trump waves to the crowd.

Home plate umpire Lance Barksdale's strike zone during the game drew attention, with some sports journalists, including Jeff Passan, increasing their appeals to MLB for a computerized strike zone. Two women in the crowd flashed their bare chests during the game—briefly visible on television—in an attempt to raise awareness for their website, claiming proceeds from the site "will be going to women with breast cancer". Along with a third woman, they were removed from the game and were banned from all MLB stadiums "indefinitely". U.S. President Donald Trump was booed and "chants of 'Lock him up!' broke out in some sections" when he and wife Melania were introduced after the third inning during the regular serviceperson recognition segment. This led to some discussion in the media of the civility required of the event and the larger political discourse taking place. This was not the first time at a World Series that a president was booed; at the 1931 World Series, taking place during Prohibition, fans in Philadelphia had chanted at Herbert Hoover, "We want beer! We want beer!"

=== Game 6 ===
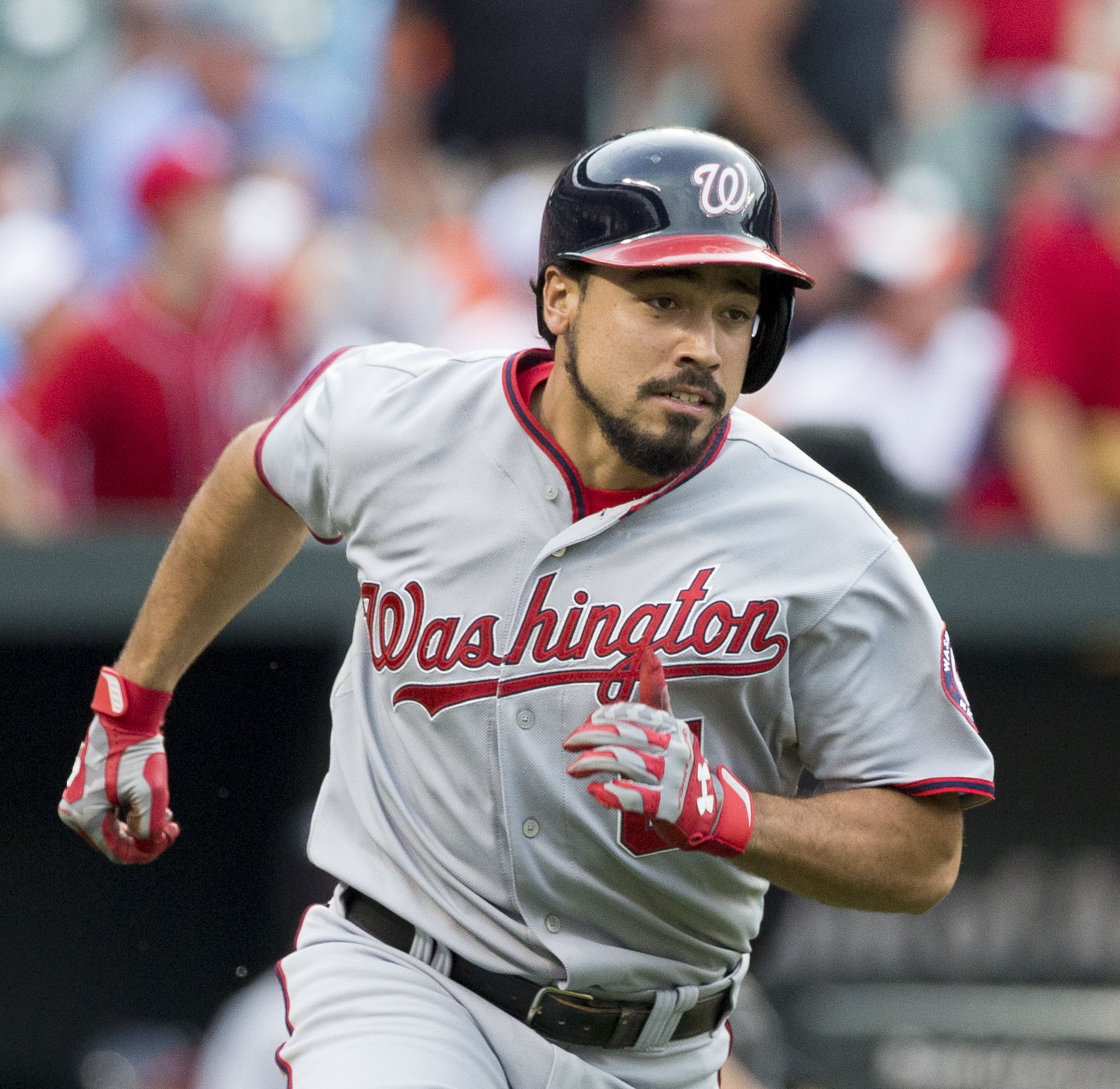
Anthony Rendon contributed five RBIs in Game 6.

October 29, 2019 7:08 pm (CDT) at Minute Maid Park in Houston, Texas, 73 °F (23 °C), roof closed
Team	1	2	3	4	5	6	7	8	9	R	H	E
Washington	1	0	0	0	2	0	2	0	2	7	9	0
Houston	2	0	0	0	0	0	0	0	0	2	6	0
WP: Stephen Strasburg (2–0) LP: Justin Verlander (0–2); Home runs: WAS: Adam Eaton (2), Juan Soto (3), Anthony Rendon (1); HOU: Alex Bregman (3); Attendance: 43,384; Boxscore

The ceremonial first pitch was thrown by Hakeem Olajuwon to Clyde Drexler, both of whom played college basketball for the Houston Cougars and later won the 1995 NBA Finals with the Houston Rockets. Starting pitchers were Justin Verlander for Houston and Stephen Strasburg for Washington, the same as in Game 2.

Anthony Rendon batted in a run in the top of the first, giving the Nationals an early 1–0 lead. A sacrifice fly by Jose Altuve and a home run by Alex Bregman in the bottom of the first gave Houston a 2–1 lead. Bregman carried his bat to first base after homering, which some media members considered disrespectful. Fifth-inning home runs by Adam Eaton and Juan Soto gave the Nationals a 3–2 lead. Soto also carried his bat to first base after homering, mimicking Bregman. Post-game, both managers voiced displeasure with the bat-carrying; Bregman apologized and said he was at fault.

Verlander exited after five innings, having allowed three runs on five hits while striking out three batters. In the top of the seventh inning, Trea Turner was controversially called out for interference on a play at first base, which Washington manager Dave Martinez furiously took issue with, leading to his ejection. It was the first time a manager had been ejected from a World Series game since Bobby Cox in 1996. Later that inning, a two-out, two-run home run by Rendon off Will Harris—who had not allowed an earned run in the postseason—increased Washington's lead to 5–2. Rendon batted in two more runs in the top of the ninth with a double off Chris Devenski, extending the Nationals' lead to 7–2. Strasburg left with one out in the bottom of the ninth, having held the Astros to two runs on five hits while striking out seven. Sean Doolittle relieved Strasburg, and allowed a two-out double to Carlos Correa, but nothing further, and the Nationals evened the series to force a deciding seventh game. This was the first instance in MLB, NBA, or NHL history when the road team won the first six games of a best-of-seven series.

==== Interference call and Martinez ejection ====
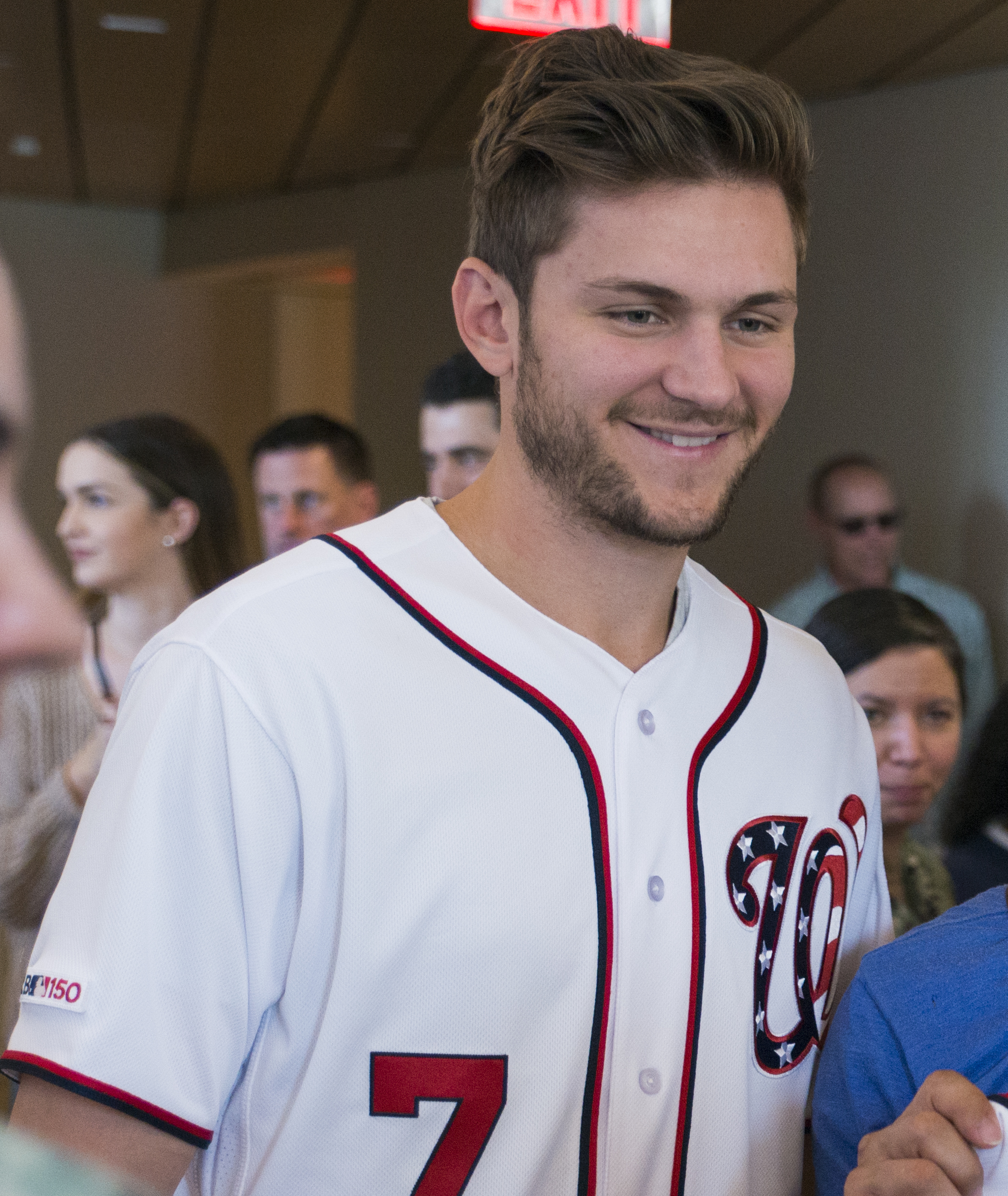
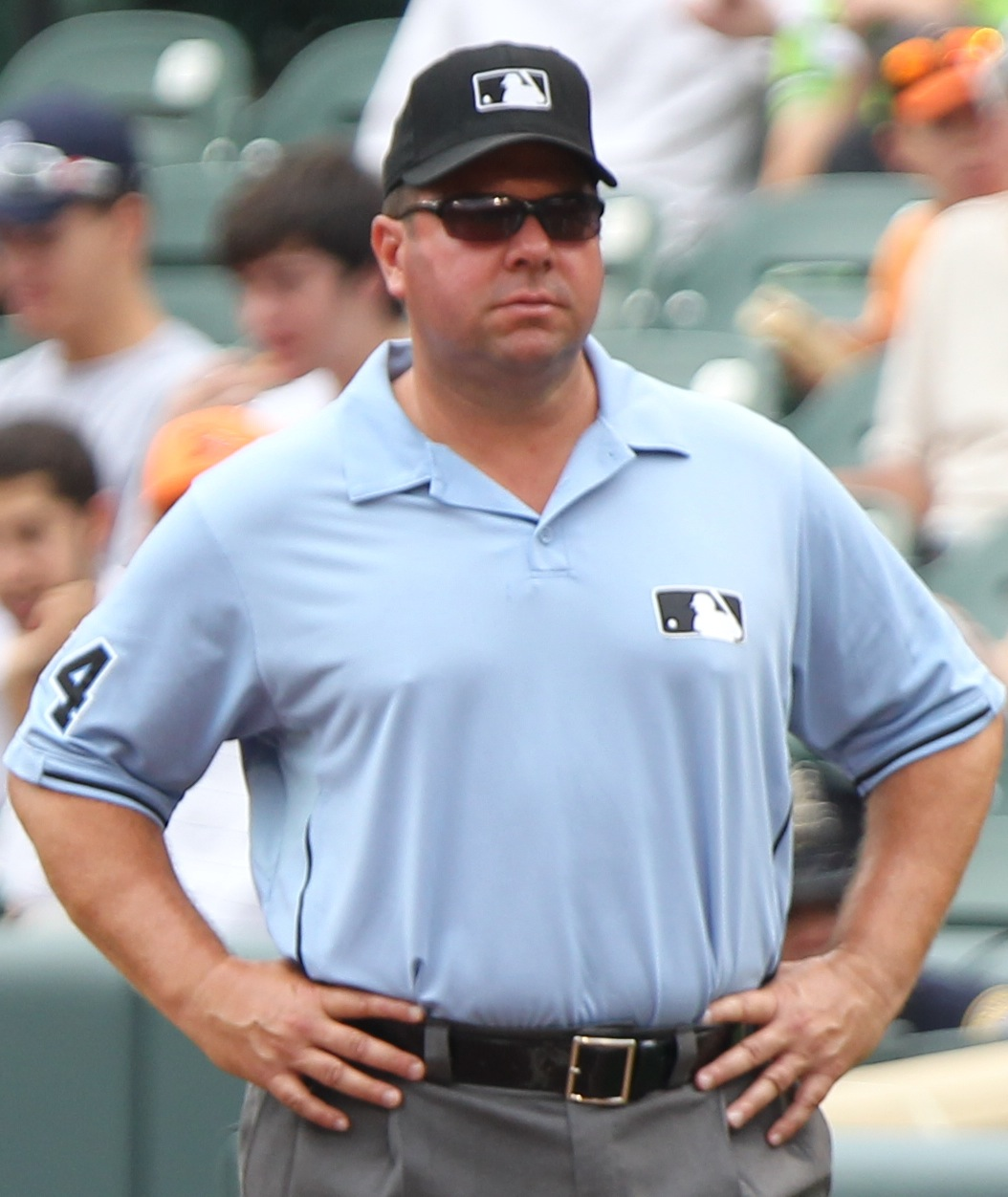
Trea Turner (left) and umpire Sam Holbrook

In the top of the seventh inning, the Nationals had a 3–2 lead with a runner, Yan Gomes, on first base with no outs when batter Trea Turner hit a swinging bunt to the third base side of the pitcher's mound. Astros pitcher Brad Peacock fielded the ball and threw it to first base; the ball was not caught by first baseman Yuli Gurriel and rolled into foul territory beyond the base, apparently giving the Nationals runners on second and third with no outs. However, Turner was called out by home plate umpire Sam Holbrook for interference, negating the play and requiring Gomes to return to first base. While initial reports and television commentary indicated the call was for running outside the 45-foot (14 m) runner's lane, MLB's chief baseball officer, Joe Torre, clarified after the game that Turner had interfered with Gurriel's attempt to catch the ball, stating that Turner "did run to the fair side of the 45-foot line, but really the violation was when he kept Gurriel from being able to catch the ball at first base." The call led to a delay of nearly 4 1/2 minutes while umpires confirmed their interpretation of the rules (the decision itself was a judgment call not reviewable via MLB instant replay). The call was argued by Nationals manager Dave Martinez when it was first made and again, more intensely, during the seventh-inning stretch, resulting in his ejection by Holbrook. It was the first ejection in a World Series since 1996, when Atlanta Braves manager Bobby Cox had been ejected.

=== Game 7 ===
External videos
- Game 7 Full replay on MLB's official YouTube channel

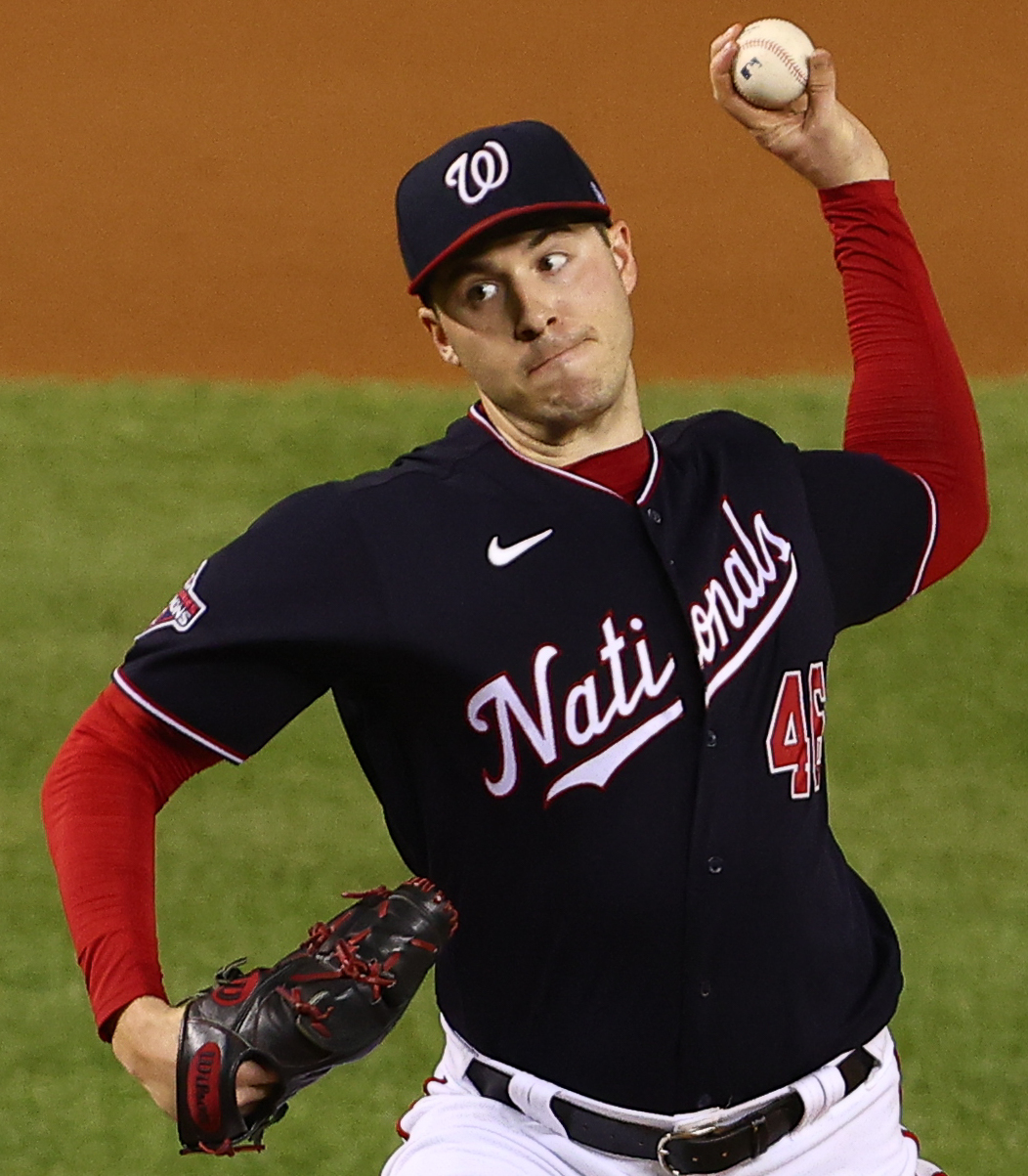
Patrick Corbin was the winning pitcher in Game 7.

October 30, 2019 7:08 pm (CDT) at Minute Maid Park in Houston, Texas, 73 °F (23 °C), roof closed
Team	1	2	3	4	5	6	7	8	9	R	H	E
Washington	0	0	0	0	0	0	3	1	2	6	9	0
Houston	0	1	0	0	1	0	0	0	0	2	9	1
WP: Patrick Corbin (1–1) LP: Will Harris (0–1); Home runs: WAS: Anthony Rendon (2), Howie Kendrick (1); HOU: Yuli Gurriel (1); Attendance: 43,326; Boxscore

This was the 40th time a World Series reached its deciding Game 7. (Note: Including the 1912 World Series, which had a deciding Game 8 because Game 2 ended in a tie.) The starting pitchers were Washington's Max Scherzer, who won Game 1, and Houston's Zack Greinke, who received a no decision in Game 3, making this the first World Series Game 7 started by two previous Cy Young Award winners. Ceremonial first pitches were thrown by former Astros Jeff Bagwell and Craig Biggio.

A home run by Yuli Gurriel in the bottom of the second inning gave the Astros an early 1–0 lead. Carlos Correa hit a two-out RBI single in the bottom of the fifth inning to extend the lead to 2–0. Scherzer pitched five innings, allowing two runs on seven hits while striking out three batters. Greinke had given up only one hit (a single) and had shut out the Nats over six innings before Anthony Rendon's home run in the top of the seventh cut the Astros' lead to 2–1. Greinke walked Soto after Rendon's homer and was then replaced by Will Harris. Harris gave up a two-run home run to Howie Kendrick off the right field foul pole, giving the Nationals a 3–2 lead, which they never relinquished. Greinke was charged with two runs on two hits while striking out three in 6 1/3 innings. Roberto Osuna pitched the eighth inning for Houston, when Juan Soto batted in Adam Eaton with two outs to give Washington a two-run lead. The Nationals extended their lead to 6–2 in the ninth inning, with two runs scoring on a one-out single by Eaton with the bases loaded. With Patrick Corbin having pitched three scoreless innings in relief for Washington, closer Daniel Hudson came in to pitch in a non-save situation in the bottom of the ninth and retired the side in order, as Michael Brantley struck out swinging to end the game, series, and baseball season, giving the Nationals franchise its first World Series title in 51 seasons, (Note: Through the 2019 World Series, the franchise had competed for 36 seasons as the Montreal Expos (1969–2004) and then 15 seasons as the Washington Nationals (2005–2019).) and the city's first since the Senators won in 1924.

The Nationals' win marked the sixth straight year that a team clinched the World Series title via a win on the road, (Note: Through the 2019 World Series, the most recent team to clinch a World Series title at home was the Boston Red Sox at Fenway Park in 2013. See List of World Series champions.) including four times that a Game 7 was won by the visiting team, which would happen again in 2025. For the first time in major North American sports history, the visiting team won all seven games of a best-of-seven postseason series. In championship series of the NBA, NHL, and MLB contested during 2019, road teams compiled an overall 17–3 record. (Note: 2019 Stanley Cup Finals road teams 5–2, 2019 NBA Finals road teams 5–1, 2019 World Series road teams 7–0.) Additionally, the Nationals became the first team to win the World Series in their first appearance since 2002, when the Anaheim Angels accomplished the feat by defeating the San Francisco Giants in seven games. During postgame ceremonies, Washington's Stephen Strasburg was presented with the World Series Most Valuable Player Award, the first time a former No. 1 overall draft pick earned the award, and the first time a pitcher had won the award since Madison Bumgarner had won in 2014.

The Nationals’ upset of the Astros was ranked as the third biggest upset in World Series history by MLB.com.

=== Series statistics ===
2019 World Series (4–3): Washington Nationals (NL) defeated Houston Astros (AL).

Team	1	2	3	4	5	6	7	8	9	R	H	E
Washington Nationals	3	1	0	2	5	1	12	4	5	33	58	4
Houston Astros	8	4	1	4	2	1	5	2	3	30	68	3
Home runs: WAS: Juan Soto (3), Adam Eaton (2), Anthony Rendon (2), Howie Kendrick (1), Kurt Suzuki (1), Michael A. Taylor (1), Ryan Zimmerman (1); HOU: Alex Bregman (3), Robinson Chirinos (2), George Springer (2), Yordan Alvarez (1), Carlos Correa (1), Yuli Gurriel (1), Martín Maldonado (1); Total attendance: 305,072 Average attendance: 43,582; Winning player's share: $382,358.18 Losing player's share: $256,030.16

The Nationals wore their alternate blue jerseys for all seven games.

== Broadcasting ==
=== Television ===
The World Series was televised by Fox for the 20th straight year. Joe Buck called the games as play-by-play announcer along with John Smoltz as color commentator and Ken Rosenthal and Tom Verducci as field reporters. Kevin Burkhardt hosted the network's pregame shows, joined by analysts Frank Thomas, Alex Rodriguez and David Ortiz. Fox Deportes aired the series in Spanish, with Rolando Nichols calling the play-by-play, Edgar Gonzalez as color commentator, and Carlos Álvarez as field reporter.

MLB International fed the series to broadcasters outside the United States, with Matt Vasgersian providing play-by-play and Buck Martinez as color commentator.

=== Ratings ===
Game	Ratings (households)	Share (households)	U.S. audience (in millions)	Ref
1	7.3	15	12.194	
2	7.1	15	11.925	
3	7.1	15	12.220	
4	5.9	13	10.219	
5	6.5	12	11.390	
6	9.6	19	16.425	
7	13.1	25	23.013	

Game 1 had the second-lowest audience for any Game 1 to date, with only the 2014 World Series having a smaller audience for the opener. Game 2 had the lowest audience for any Game 2 to date, a distinction previously held by the 2012 World Series. Game 4 was the lowest rated World Series game ever, and had the second-smallest audience ever, with only Game 3 of the 2008 World Series having a smaller audience. Game 7 was the least-watched Game 7 ever, falling below the seventh game of 2014. Overall, this World Series had the fourth-lowest average number of viewers, with only 2014, 2012, and 2008 being lower. Ratings spiked considerably for Game 7, and there were strong ratings in the Houston (42.7/63) and Washington, D.C. (31.8/53) markets, making it the most-viewed MLB game in Washington since 1998.

=== Radio ===
ESPN Radio broadcast the World Series for the 22nd straight year, with coverage presented by AutoZone. Dan Shulman served as play-by-play announcer, with Chris Singleton as color commentator and Buster Olney as field reporter. Marc Kestecher and Kevin Winter hosted the pregame shows with reporter Tim Kurkjian. New Spanish-language radio network Unanimo Deportes, flagshipped at WMYM Miami, broadcast its first World Series with Beto Ferreiro and Orlando Hernández announcing.

Locally, both teams' flagship radio stations broadcast the series with their regular announcers. In Houston, KBME aired the series with Robert Ford and Steve Sparks announcing. In Washington, WJFK-FM aired the series with Charlie Slowes and Dave Jageler calling the games. Per MLB rules, the teams' other radio affiliates may carry the series but must air the ESPN Radio broadcast.

== Aftermath ==
=== Nationals ===
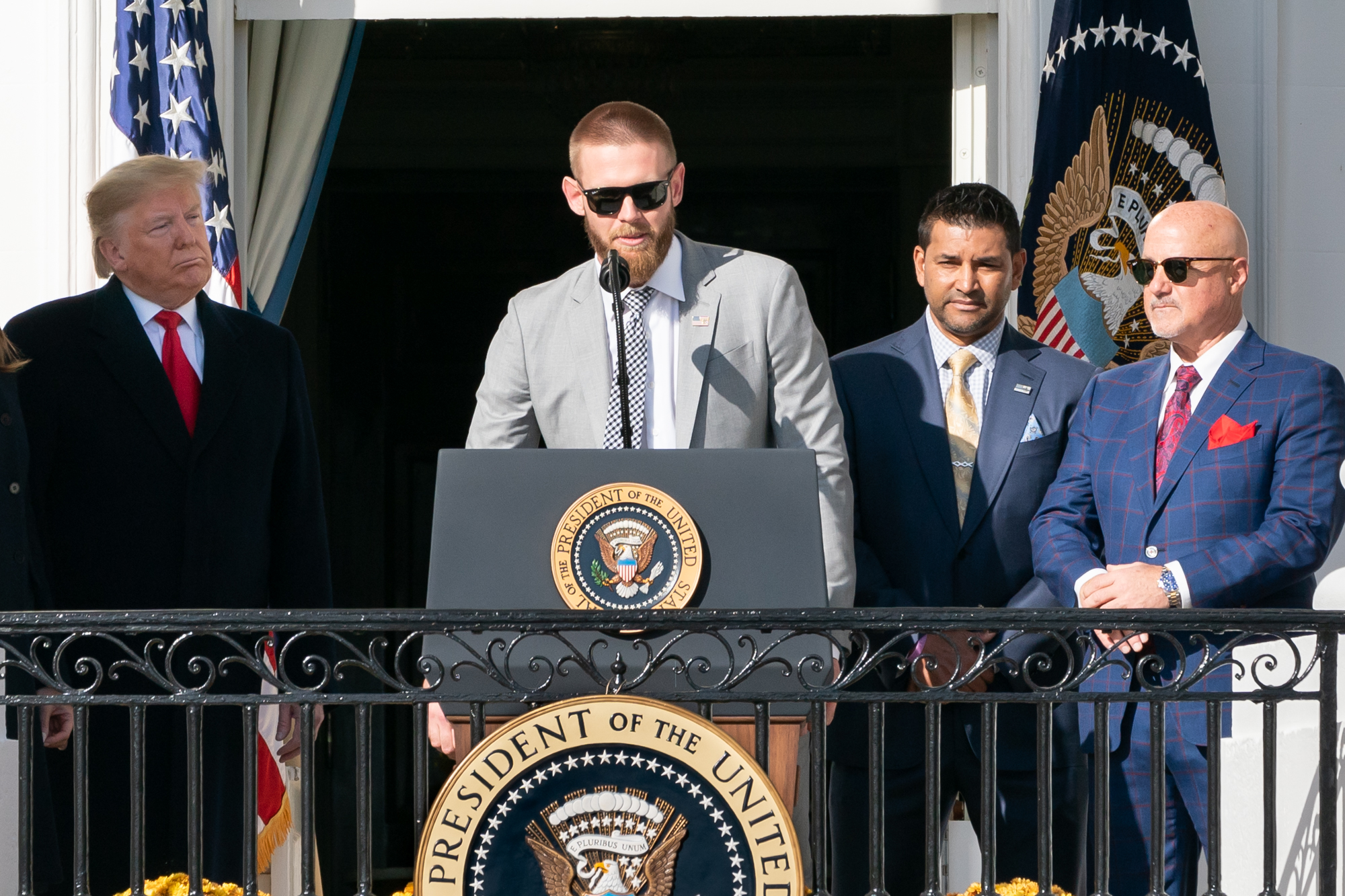
Stephen Strasburg with Dave Martinez and Mike Rizzo, meeting President Donald Trump, at the White House after the 2019 World Series Championship

Following their World Series victory, the Nationals quickly lost many players from their championship team and fell to the bottom of the league. They tried to stay competitive by spending on free agents. They re-signed Stephen Strasburg to a seven-year, $175 million deal, added second baseman Starlin Castro on a two-year, $12 million contract, and signed Astros' reliever Will Harris (the losing pitcher of Game 7) to a three-year, $24 million deal. These deals were disastrous, and all three players struggled with injuries during the duration of their contracts. That same offseason, they let all-star third baseman Anthony Rendon leave in free agency to the Los Angeles Angels in the offseason. Other players that left included part-time catcher Kurt Suzuki (who also left for the Angels), second baseman Brian Dozier, first baseman Matt Adams, and reliever Fernando Rodney, the latter three who all retired. The COVID-19 pandemic kept the Nationals from properly celebrating their 2019 championship the following season, as spectators were not allowed in the stands during the shortened season. They raised their championship banner in front of an empty Nationals Park on the first day of the 2020 season, and received their championship rings in the clubhouse rather than on the field in front of the fans. The Nationals finished tied for last in the NL East in 2020. In addition, postseason hero Howie Kendrick retired at the end of the season.

Struggling at the trade deadline in 2021, the Nationals engaged in a large-scale selloff of top players, most of whom had led them to the championship. The Nationals became the first team to trade three players who were All-Stars before the end of the season, which included starting pitcher Max Scherzer (traded to the Dodgers), outfielder Kyle Schwarber (traded to the Red Sox), and shortstop Trea Turner (also traded to the Dodgers). They also traded off important pieces from their World Series team, such as catcher Yan Gomes being traded to the Athletics and reliever Daniel Hudson being traded to the Padres. They would trade superstar Juan Soto along with starting first baseman Josh Bell to San Diego the following trade deadline, and by the end of the 2022 season, only a handful of players from the 2019 championship team were still with the club.

The Nationals rotation that many saw as the team's strength during their World Series run was not as effective going forward. Scherzer, although still dominant, struggled with lower body injuries until he was traded (along with Trea Turner) to the Los Angeles Dodgers at the 2021 trade deadline. In 2023, Scherzer would win his second World Series ring with the Texas Rangers. Patrick Corbin led the National League in losses and earned runs given up in 2021 and 2022. Anibal Sanchez struggled mighty during the 2020 season; so much that he spent the 2021 season out of baseball entirely, only to return to Washington in 2022. Lastly, Stephen Strasburg, Washington's MVP of the 2019 World Series, who was rewarded with a lucrative seven-year contract with the Nationals after the World Series, continued to struggle with injury. He only made a total of eight starts from 2020 to 2023, throwing just 528 pitches in the majors the rest of his career before retiring in 2024.

=== Astros ===
Speculation about sign stealing by the Astros had been rampant for a number of years. After being knocked out by the Nationals in the National League Division Series, several Dodgers (the team the Astros beat in the 2017 World Series) reached out to Washington Nationals second baseman Brian Dozier, who had been with Los Angeles the previous year, to warn him that Houston was elaborately stealing signs. Many American League clubs also reached out to Washington to say the same, as well.

Shortly after the 2019 World Series concluded, on November 12, 2019, journalists Ken Rosenthal and Evan Drellich published a story in The Athletic detailing for the first time specific allegations that the Astros had engaged in illicit electronic sign stealing. MLB launched an investigation and found evidence that the Astros did engage in illegal electronic sign stealing in 2017 and 2018, but found no evidence that they used the scheme in 2019. Hours after MLB announced its sanctions, Astros owner Jim Crane fired general manager Jeff Luhnow and AJ Hinch. Crane said: "Neither of them started this but neither of them did anything about it". Veteran manager Dusty Baker was hired a few months later and stayed with the club until retiring in 2023.

After losing the 2019 World Series, the Astros have continued to be a top team, coming within one win of making the World Series in the shortened 2020 season and returning to the World Series in 2021, which they lost to the Atlanta Braves, and in 2022, when they defeated the Philadelphia Phillies. They were beaten by their in-state rival Texas Rangers in the 2023 ALCS, in which the visiting team again won all seven games. In 2024, the Astros were defeated by their former manager A.J. Hinch, and the Detroit Tigers in the 2024 American League Wild Card Series, which ended Houston's streak of seven consecutive ALCS appearances.

== See also ==
- 2019 Japan Series
- 2019 Korean Series
- Curse of Bob Short
