= Adam Eaton (outfielder) =

American baseball player (born 1988)

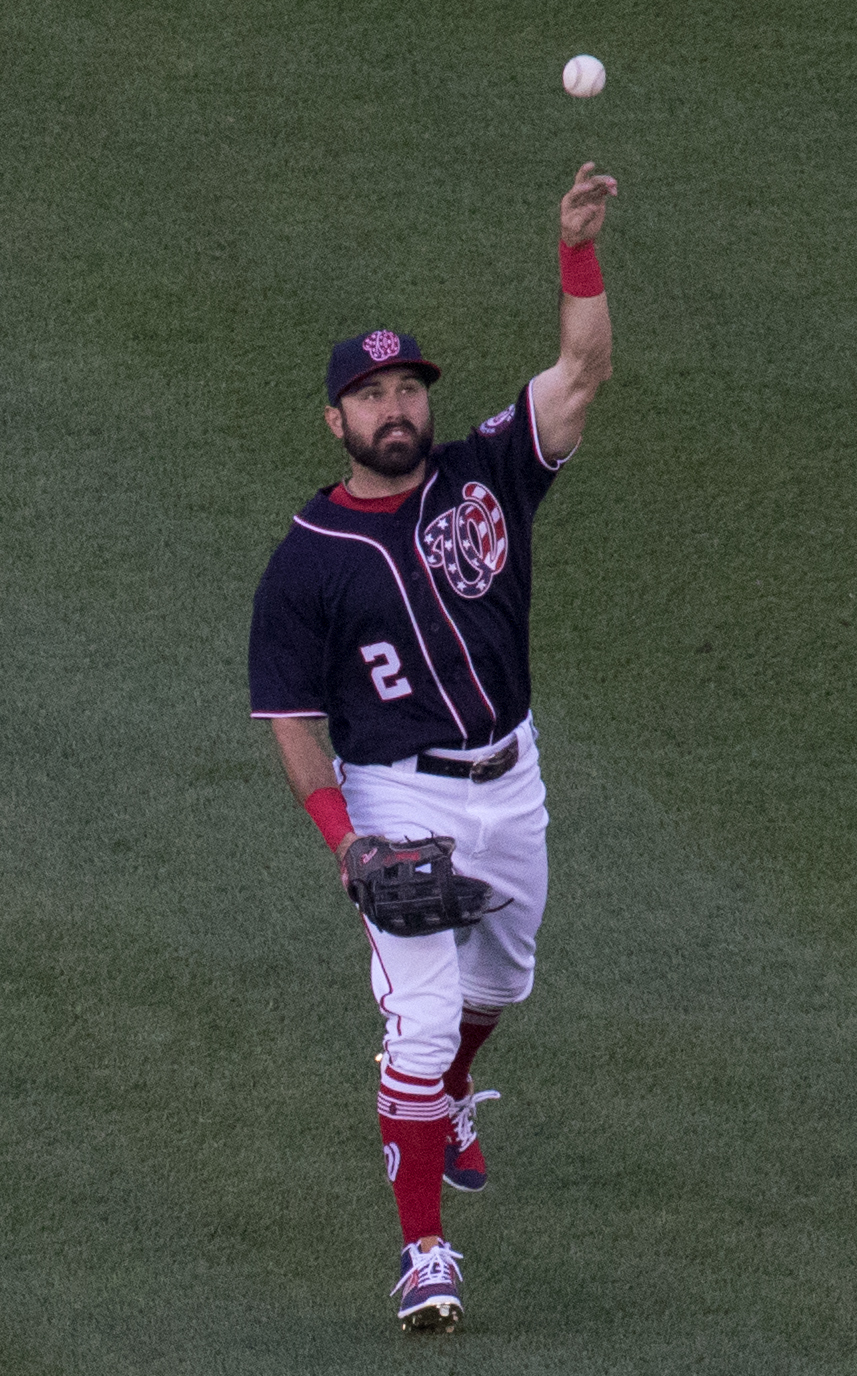
- Eaton with the Washington Nationals in 2017

Los Angeles Angels – No. 92
- Outfielder / Coach
- Born: December 6, 1988 (age 37); Springfield, Ohio, U.S.
- Batted: Left Threw: Left

MLB debut
- September 4, 2012, for the Arizona Diamondbacks

Last MLB appearance
- August 14, 2021, for the Los Angeles Angels

MLB statistics
- Batting average: .276
- Home runs: 66
- Runs batted in: 319
- Stats at Baseball Reference

Teams
- As player: Arizona Diamondbacks (2012–2013); Chicago White Sox (2014–2016); Washington Nationals (2017–2020); Chicago White Sox (2021); Los Angeles Angels (2021); As coach: Los Angeles Angels (2026–present)

Career highlights and awards
- World Series champion (2019)

Adam Cory Eaton (born December 6, 1988) is an American former professional baseball outfielder and current first base coach for the Los Angeles Angels of Major League Baseball (MLB). He played in MLB for the Arizona Diamondbacks, Chicago White Sox, Washington Nationals, and Angels.

Eaton played college baseball for Miami University before the Diamondbacks selected him in the 19th round of the 2010 MLB draft. He made his MLB debut in 2012 with the Diamondbacks, and played with them through the 2013 season, when they traded him to the White Sox. He played for the White Sox from 2014 to 2016 and the Nationals from 2017 to 2020. He was also a member of the Nationals' 2019 World Series champion team.

In 2022, he was hired as the Director of Player Development for the Michigan State Spartans baseball team.

== Playing career ==
=== Amateur career ===
Eaton graduated from Kenton Ridge High School in Springfield, Ohio. He is the fourth player to reach the major leagues from Kenton Ridge, preceded by Dave Burba, Rick White and Dustin Hermanson. A pitcher and outfielder in high school, Eaton's fastball could reach as high as 92 mph, while he batted .482 in his junior season in 2006. He helped lead his team to the regional finals in 2004 and 2005. Eaton earned All-Ohio honorable mention honors that year, as well as being named to the All-Miami Valley first team and the Springfield News-Sun's All-Area first team as a sophomore and junior. However, a bulging disc suffered while playing basketball limited Eaton in his senior season in 2007.

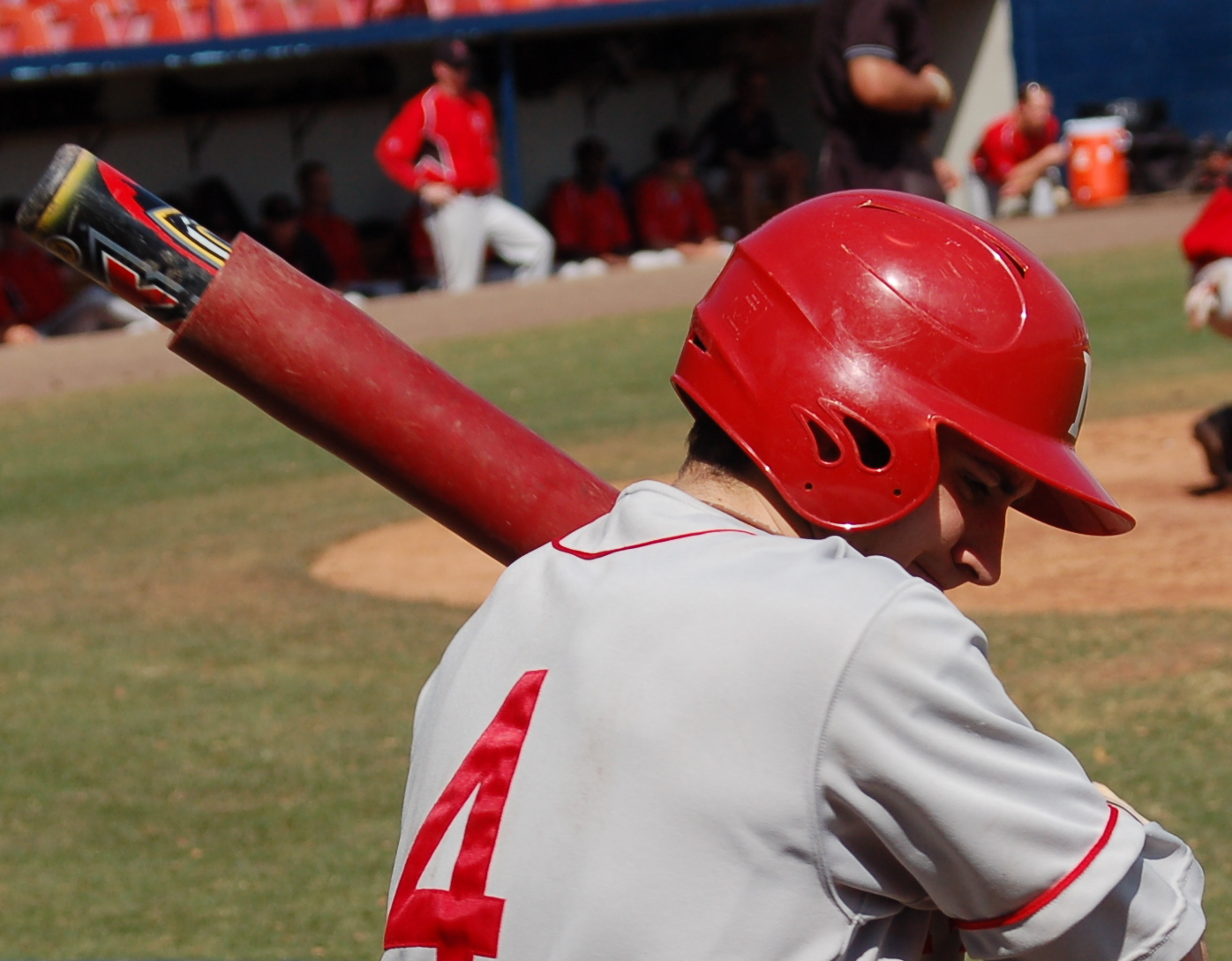
Eaton with Miami in 2009

Eaton committed to attend Miami University on a baseball scholarship. Miami recruited Eaton as a two-way player. He played for the Miami RedHawks baseball team in the Mid-American Conference (MAC) in NCAA Division I. He was a two-time All-MAC selection and set the school record for triples with 18.

=== Arizona Diamondbacks ===
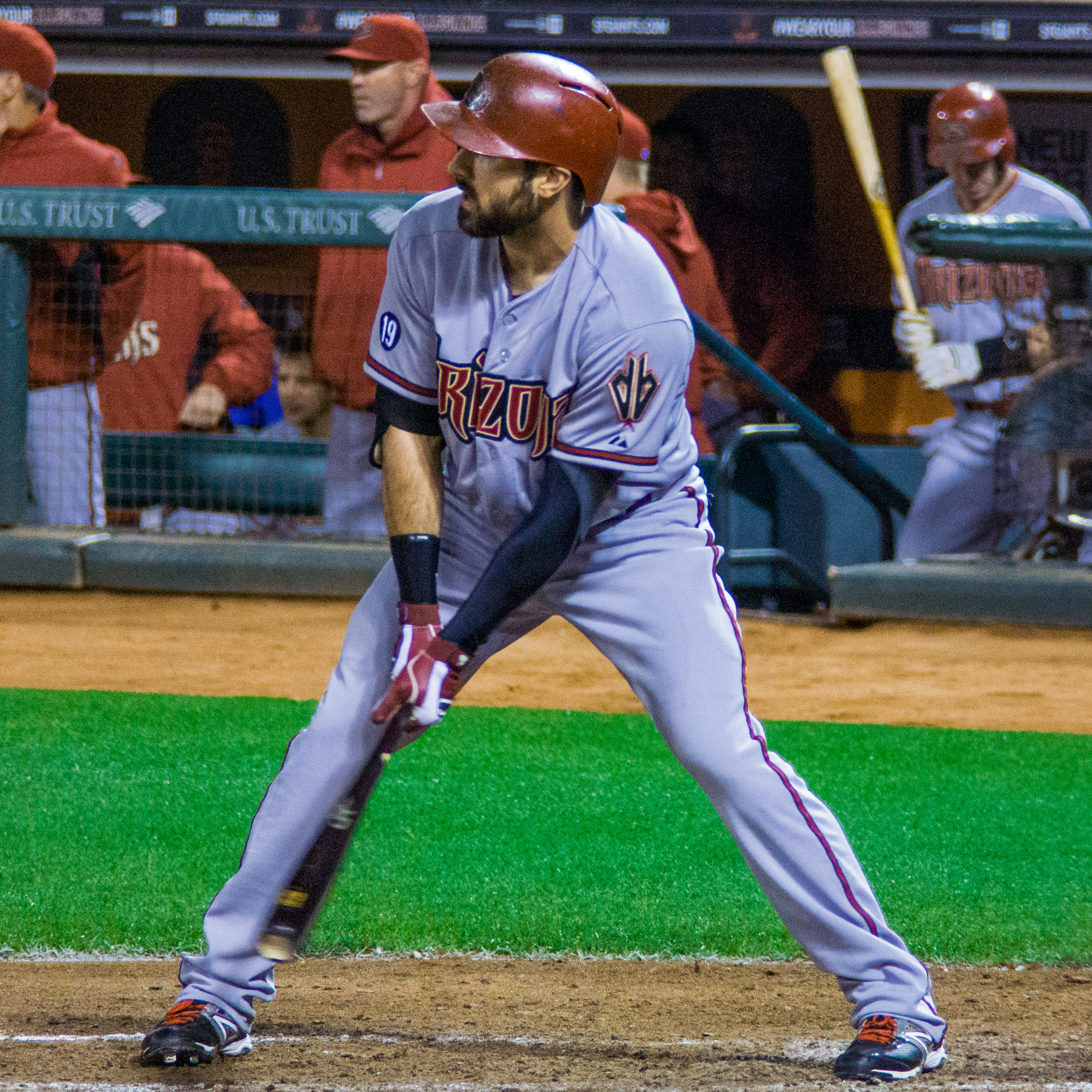
Eaton batting for the Arizona Diamondbacks in 2013

The Diamondbacks drafted Eaton in the 19th round of the 2010 Major League Baseball draft, with the 571st overall selection. In 2010 and 2011, Eaton had a .340 batting average with the Diamondbacks' minor league affiliates. Eaton was named a Pioneer League All-Star outfielder in 2010, and a California League All-Star in 2011. In 2011, he batted .318 with 145 hits and 72 walks, good for a .434 on-base percentage (OBP), which was the fourth best OBP in minor league baseball. Eaton also stole 34 bases. He was invited to spring training in 2012, where he impressed Diamondbacks' manager Kirk Gibson, and received as many at bats as Diamondbacks regulars.

Eaton played for the Reno Aces of the Triple-A Pacific Coast League (PCL) in 2012. He was named the PCL Rookie of the Year and Most Valuable Player. The Diamondbacks called Eaton up to the major leagues on September 4. Eaton was expected to play for the Diamondbacks for the 2013 season, but suffered an injury to his right elbow during spring training. He returned to the Diamondbacks in July, and played in 66 games.

=== Chicago White Sox ===
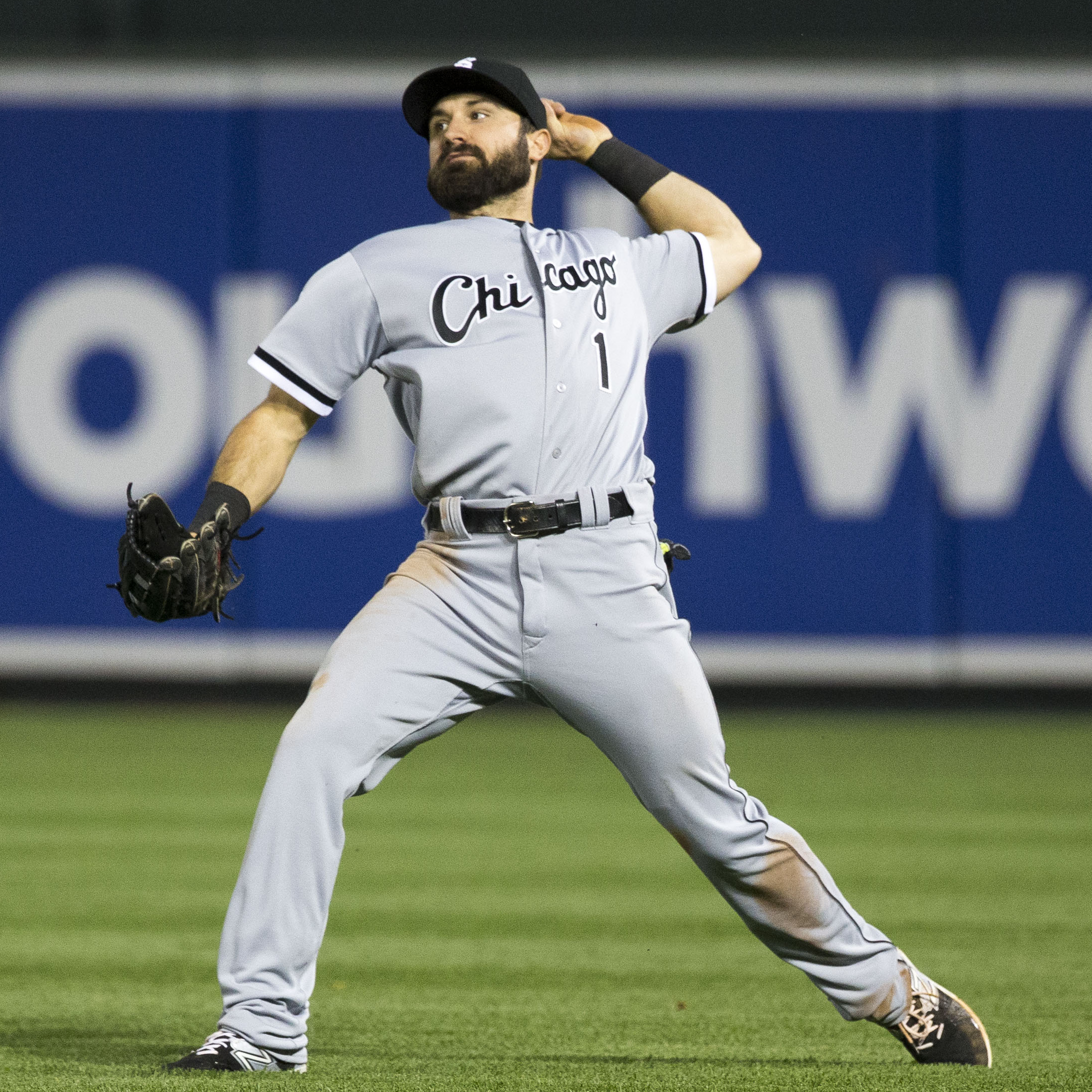
Eaton with the Chicago White Sox in 2016

On December 10, 2013, the Diamondbacks traded Eaton to the Chicago White Sox in a three-team deal, involving the Diamondbacks, the Los Angeles Angels of Anaheim, and the White Sox. The Diamondbacks received Mark Trumbo from the Angels and two players to be named later (Brandon Jacobs and A. J. Schugel) and the Angels received Tyler Skaggs from the Diamondbacks and Hector Santiago from the White Sox.

Eaton batted .300 with 15 stolen bases during the 2014 season. During spring training in 2015, Eaton and the White Sox agreed to a five-year contract extension worth $23.5 million, with options for two additional years. During a game against the Kansas City Royals on April 22, 2015, Eaton grounded out to Yordano Ventura, who shouted profanity at Eaton, which ignited a bench-clearing brawl. Eaton was unaffected while five players, including Ventura were ejected.

=== Washington Nationals ===
On December 7, 2016, the White Sox traded Eaton to the Washington Nationals for Lucas Giolito, Reynaldo López, and Dane Dunning.

==== 2017 ====
On Opening Day, Eaton went 1-for-2, was walked twice, stole a base, scored a run, and hit a double against the Miami Marlins. On April 28, 2017, Eaton stumbled when reaching first base and left the game. The next day, on April 29, Eaton was diagnosed with a left knee strain, placing him on the 10-day disabled list. The same night, further tests from MRIs revealed that Eaton had a torn ACL, as well as a torn meniscus and a sprained ankle. He would miss the rest of the 2017 season.

==== 2018 ====
Eaton got a late start on spring training in 2018, with the Nationals wanting to handle him with care. He got off to a hot start at the plate to begin the season, winning his first National League Player of the Week award of the year (and in his career) after going 8-for-13 with two home runs against the Cincinnati Reds in a three-game series. However, Eaton continued to move awkwardly on his surgically repaired left leg, and after exiting a game against the New York Mets early on April 5 following an aggressive sliding play at the plate to score a run, he was ultimately placed on the disabled list with what was described as a bone bruise in his left ankle on April 11. On May 10, Eaton underwent arthroscopic surgery on his injured ankle in Green Bay, Wisconsin, with Dr. Robert Anderson discovering and removing a small tear in the cartilage of the ankle that was causing discomfort. Following the chondral flap operation and a brief rehab assignment with the Class-AA Harrisburg Senators and High-A Potomac Nationals, Eaton was activated from the disabled list for a start in right field against the San Francisco Giants at Nationals Park on June 9. Eaton compiled a .301 average and .805 OPS over 319 plate appearances on the season.

==== 2019 ====
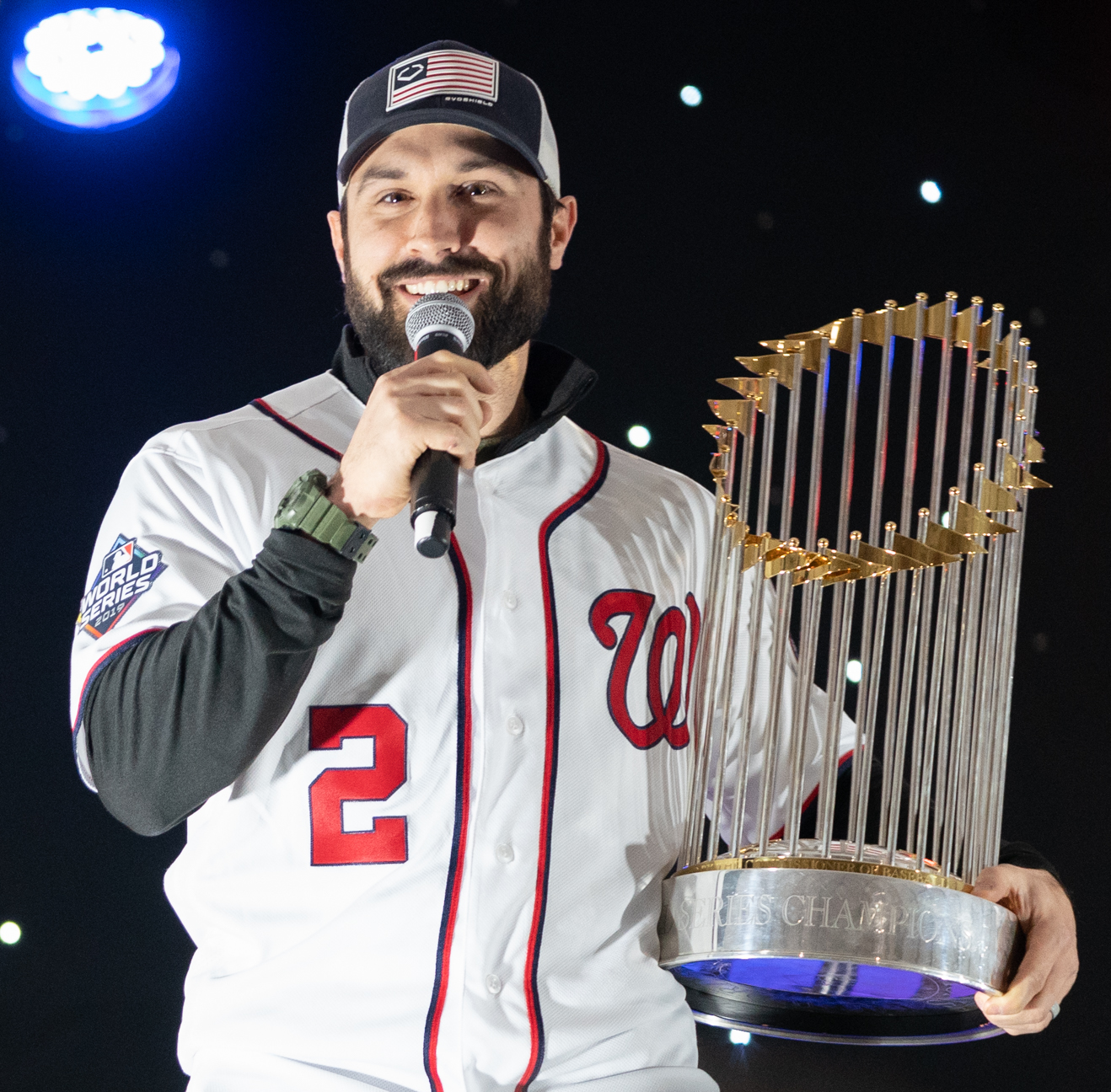
Eaton with the Nationals' 2019 World Series trophy

In 2019 he batted .279/.365/.428 with 15 home runs and 49 runs batted in. The Nationals finished the year 93–69, clinching a wild card spot and winning the World Series over the Astros.

==== 2020 ====
In 2020, Eaton batted .226/.285/.384 with four home runs and 17 runs batted in during 41 games in the pandemic-shortened season.

=== Chicago White Sox (second stint) ===
On December 8, 2020, he signed a 1-year, $7 million deal to return to the White Sox with an $8.5 million club option for 2022. After hitting .201/.298/.344 in 58 games for Chicago, the team designated Eaton for assignment on July 7, 2021. Eaton was released by Chicago on July 12.

=== Los Angeles Angels ===
On July 14, 2021, Eaton signed a major league contract with the Los Angeles Angels. In 25 games for the Angels, Eaton hit .200 with one home run and two runs batted in. On August 15, Eaton was designated for assignment by the Angels. On August 20, Eaton was released by the Angels.

In a May 2022 interview, Eaton confirmed his MLB career was over.

== Coaching career ==
=== Michigan State ===
In 2022, Eaton was hired as the Director of Player Development for the Michigan State Spartans baseball team.

=== Los Angeles Angels ===
On November 11, 2025, the Los Angeles Angels hired Eaton to serve as the team's first base coach under new manager Kurt Suzuki.

== Personal life ==
Adam has been confused with former Major League Baseball (MLB) pitcher Adam Eaton. In one instance, he received six licensing checks from MLB worth $20,000 each, and has received fan mail meant for the other MLB veteran. Eaton is married to former Miami RedHawks softball player Katie Osburn Eaton. They have two sons, and reside in Brighton, Michigan during the offseason.
