= 2019 National League Wild Card Game =

	1	2	3	4	5	6	7	8	9	R	H	E
Milwaukee Brewers	2	1	0	0	0	0	0	0	0	3	7	2
Washington Nationals	0	0	1	0	0	0	0	3	x	4	5	0
- Date: October 1, 2019
- Venue: Nationals Park
- City: Washington, D.C.
- Managers: Craig Counsell (Milwaukee Brewers); Dave Martinez (Washington Nationals)
- Umpires: HP: Mike Everitt; 1B: Kerwin Danley; 2B: Jeff Nelson (crew chief); 3B: Cory Blaser; LF: David Rackley; RF: Carlos Torres
- Attendance: 42,993
- Ceremonial first pitch: Aaron Barrett
- Television: TBS
- TV announcers: Ernie Johnson Jr., Ron Darling, Jeff Francoeur, and Lauren Shehadi
- Radio: ESPN
- Radio announcers: Jon Sciambi and Jim Bowden

The 2019 National League Wild Card Game was a play-in game during Major League Baseball's (MLB) 2019 postseason contested between the National League's two wild card teams: the Washington Nationals and Milwaukee Brewers. Played on October 1, Washington won by a score of 4–3 to advance to the National League Division Series to face the Los Angeles Dodgers. The game was televised nationally by TBS.

== Background ==
Washington entered the game with a 93–69 record, while Milwaukee was 89–73. They met six times during the regular season, with Milwaukee winning the season series 4–2.

The Washington Nationals secured a berth in the Wild Card Game for their first playoff appearance as a wild card team on September 24, finishing second in the National League East, behind the Atlanta Braves. They subsequently secured home field advantage on September 28.

The Milwaukee Brewers secured a postseason berth on September 26 and became the second NL wild card, their third playoff appearance as a wild card team, the first being in 2008, and their first Wild Card Game appearance on September 29, the final day of the regular season after they finished second in the National League Central, behind the St. Louis Cardinals.

== Game results ==
=== Line score ===
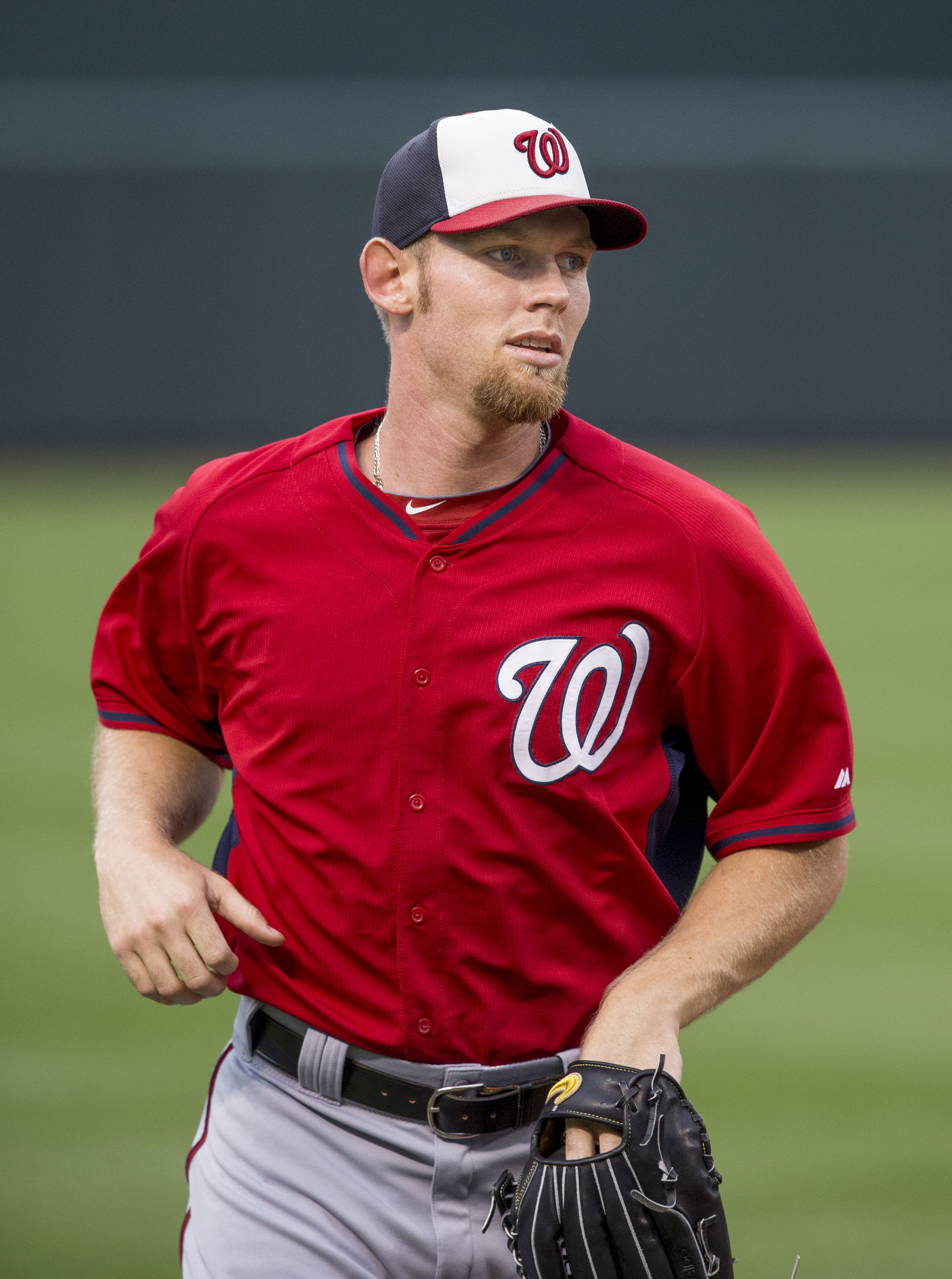
Winning pitcher Stephen Strasburg

October 1, 2019 8:08 pm (EDT) at Nationals Park in Washington, D.C., 83 °F (28 °C), clear
Team	1	2	3	4	5	6	7	8	9	R	H	E
Milwaukee	2	1	0	0	0	0	0	0	0	3	7	2
Washington	0	0	1	0	0	0	0	3	X	4	5	0
WP: Stephen Strasburg (1–0) LP: Josh Hader (0–1) Sv: Daniel Hudson (1); Home runs: MIL: Yasmani Grandal (1), Eric Thames (1); WAS: Trea Turner (1); Attendance: 42,993; Boxscore

For the first time in Montreal-Washington franchise history, the Nationals appeared in a wild-card game, facing the Milwaukee Brewers at Nationals Park. Although Max Scherzer had suffered a series of injuries since mid-season, manager Dave Martinez decided to go with him as Washington's starter for the game. Scherzer walked the Brewers′ first batter, right fielder Trent Grisham, and then gave up a home run in the next Milwaukee at-bat to catcher Yasmani Grandal. In the second inning, Milwaukee first baseman Eric Thames led off with a home run, and the Nationals trailed 3–0. Scherzer faced threats in the fourth inning, when Thames doubled and advanced to third, and in the fifth inning, when he walked both pinch hitter Travis Shaw and Grandal, but he did not allow the Brewers to score again. He left the game after five innings, having thrown 77 pitches, walking three Brewers and striking out six.

Washington generated little offense over the first seven innings. Against Milwaukee starter Brandon Woodruff, the Nationals managed only two hits, although one of them was a home run that shortstop Trea Turner hit in the bottom of the third to cut Milwaukee's lead to 3–1. Woodruff left the game after four innings, and Milwaukee relievers Brent Suter and Drew Pomeranz pitched the fifth, sixth and seventh innings without allowing any base runners. For Washington, Stephen Strasburg came into the game in relief of Scherzer — the first relief appearance of Strasburg's career, including both regular season and playoff games — and during the sixth, seventh, and eighth innings gave up two hits but no runs, walking no one and striking out four. The game's third through seventh innings thus mostly passed quietly, although an electrical malfunction at Nationals Park caused fire alarms to sound in the fourth inning and knocked out the public address system for several minutes, resulting in the nightly Presidents Race being run without the customary play-by-play and with third baseman Anthony Rendon and left fielder Juan Soto coming to bat unannounced in the bottom of the fourth.

The bottom of the eighth was the decisive inning of the game. Milwaukee closer Josh Hader came in for a potential six-out save and struck out center fielder Victor Robles to start the inning. Then Michael A. Taylor pinch-hit for Strasburg and reached first when the umpiring crew ruled that a pitch which appeared either to have hit Taylor or the knob of his bat had in fact hit him, and a Brewers challenge resulted in that decision being upheld. Trea Turner struck out, but pinch hitter Ryan Zimmerman then hit a broken-bat single to center, advancing Taylor to third. After Andrew Stevenson came in to pinch-run for Zimmerman, Anthony Rendon – batting with the crowd chanting "MVP! MVP!" – walked on a full count to load the bases. Juan Soto then singled to right and Milwaukee right fielder Trent Grisham misplayed the ball; by the time Soto was tagged out between second and third to end the inning, Taylor, Stevenson, and Rendon all had scored to give the Nationals a 4–3 lead, their first lead of the game. Daniel Hudson then closed for the Nats, giving up one hit in a scoreless ninth inning and earning the save by getting Ben Gamel to fly out to lock down a 4–3 victory.

The win was the Nationals′ ninth in a row, and as the home crowd chanted "Beat LA! Beat LA!," the Nationals celebrated on the field. Previously, the Nationals – who had lost eight of their last nine playoff losses by one run – had been 0–3 in winner-take-all postseason games, and all three losses had come in National League Division Series games at Nationals Park and by a combined total of only four runs. The wild-card victory over Milwaukee was the first time in Nationals history, and only the second time in franchise history, that the team had advanced beyond the first round of the playoffs. For Max Scherzer, the win broke a streak of seven straight postseason games in which his team had lost a game in which he appeared. The Nationals advanced to the 2019 National League Division Series to face the Los Angeles Dodgers.

== Aftermath ==
The 2019 National League Wild Card game would be a sign of things to come for the Nationals. The Nats would thrive in playing in elimination games during the 2019 postseason, as they went 5–0 in such games, on the way to their first championship in franchise history and first for a Washington D.C. baseball team since 1924.

== See also ==
- 2019 American League Wild Card Game
- Milwaukee Brewers reverse World Series curse
