= 2019 Major League Baseball postseason =

2019 Major League Baseball playoffs

Tournament details
- Dates: October 1–30, 2019
- Teams: 10

Final positions
- Champions: Washington Nationals (1st title)
- Runners-up: Houston Astros

Tournament statistics
- Most HRs: Jose Altuve (HOU) & Juan Soto (WSH) (5)
- Most SBs: Cody Bellinger (LAD) & George Springer (HOU) (3)
- Most Ks (as pitcher): Gerrit Cole (HOU) & Stephen Strasburg (WSH) (47)

Awards
- MVP: Stephen Strasburg (WSH)

The 2019 Major League Baseball postseason was the playoff tournament of Major League Baseball for the 2019 season. The winners of the Division Series would move on to the League Championship Series to determine the pennant winners that face each other in the World Series.

In the American League, the Houston Astros and New York Yankees returned for the fourth time in the past five years, the Minnesota Twins returned for the second time in three years, the Oakland Athletics made their fifth appearance in the past eight years, and the Tampa Bay Rays returned for the first time since 2013. This was the second postseason in a row in which the American League had at least three teams finish the regular season with 100 or more wins.

In the National League, the Los Angeles Dodgers made their seventh straight appearance, the Atlanta Braves and Milwaukee Brewers clinched a postseason berth for the second year in a row, the St. Louis Cardinals made their first postseason appearance since 2015, and the Washington Nationals made their fifth appearance in the past eight years. The Dodgers also finished with at least 100 regular season wins, making this the first postseason to feature four 100-win teams. To date, this remains Washington’s most recent postseason appearance.

The postseason began on October 1, and ended on October 30, with the Nationals upsetting the heavily-favored Astros in seven games in the 2019 World Series. It was the first title in franchise history for the Nationals, and the first World Series title won by a team from Washington, D.C. since 1924.

== Playoff seeds ==
American League Teams National League Teams

The following teams qualified for the postseason:

=== American League ===
1. Houston Astros – 107–55, AL West champions
2. New York Yankees – 103–59, AL East champions
3. Minnesota Twins – 101–61, AL Central champions
4. Oakland Athletics – 97–65
5. Tampa Bay Rays – 96–66

=== National League ===
1. Los Angeles Dodgers – 106–56, NL West champions
2. Atlanta Braves – 97–65, NL East champions
3. St. Louis Cardinals – 91–71, NL Central champions
4. Washington Nationals – 93–69
5. Milwaukee Brewers – 89–73

== Playoff bracket ==
Wild Card Games (ALWC, NLWC)
4 | Oakland | 0
5 | Tampa Bay | 1
4 | Washington | 1
5 | Milwaukee | 0

Division Series (ALDS, NLDS)
1 | Houston | 3
5 | Tampa Bay | 2
American League
2 | NY Yankees | 3
3 | Minnesota | 0
1 | LA Dodgers | 2
4 | Washington | 3
National League
2 | Atlanta | 2
3 | St. Louis | 3

League Championship Series (ALCS, NLCS)
1 | Houston | 4
2 | NY Yankees | 2
4 | Washington | 4
3 | St. Louis | 0

World Series
AL1 | Houston | 3
NL4 | Washington | 4

== American League Wild Card ==
=== (4) Oakland Athletics vs. (5) Tampa Bay Rays ===
Wednesday, October 2, 2019 5:09 pm (PDT) at RingCentral Coliseum in Oakland, California, 70 °F (21 °C), partly cloudy
| Team | 1 | 2 | 3 | 4 | 5 | 6 | 7 | 8 | 9 | R | H | E |
|---|---|---|---|---|---|---|---|---|---|---|---|---|
| Tampa Bay | 1 | 2 | 1 | 0 | 1 | 0 | 0 | 0 | 0 | 5 | 7 | 1 |
| Oakland | 0 | 0 | 1 | 0 | 0 | 0 | 0 | 0 | 0 | 1 | 8 | 0 |
WP: Charlie Morton (1–0) LP: Sean Manaea (0–1); Home runs: TB: Yandy Díaz 2 (2), Avisaíl García (1), Tommy Pham (1); OAK: None; Attendance: 54,005; Boxscore

The Rays defeated the Athletics 5–1 to advance to the ALDS for the first time since 2013.

== National League Wild Card ==
=== (4) Washington Nationals vs. (5) Milwaukee Brewers ===
October 1, 2019 8:08 pm (EDT) at Nationals Park in Washington, D.C., 83 °F (28 °C), clear
| Team | 1 | 2 | 3 | 4 | 5 | 6 | 7 | 8 | 9 | R | H | E |
|---|---|---|---|---|---|---|---|---|---|---|---|---|
| Milwaukee | 2 | 1 | 0 | 0 | 0 | 0 | 0 | 0 | 0 | 3 | 7 | 2 |
| Washington | 0 | 0 | 1 | 0 | 0 | 0 | 0 | 3 | X | 4 | 5 | 0 |
WP: Stephen Strasburg (1–0) LP: Josh Hader (0–1) Sv: Daniel Hudson (1); Home runs: MIL: Yasmani Grandal (1), Eric Thames (1); WAS: Trea Turner (1); Attendance: 42,993; Boxscore

The Nationals rallied from an early 3–0 deficit to defeat the Brewers by a final score of 4–3 to advance to the NLDS for the fifth time in seven years. This was the first playoff series win by the Nationals since 1981, when the team was known as the Montreal Expos.

== American League Division Series ==
=== (1) Houston Astros vs. (5) Tampa Bay Rays ===
Houston won the series, 3–2.

| Game | Date | Score | Location | Time | Attendance |
|---|---|---|---|---|---|
| 1 | October 4 | Tampa Bay Rays – 2, Houston Astros – 6 | Minute Maid Park | 3:24 | 43,360 |
| 2 | October 5 | Tampa Bay Rays – 1, Houston Astros – 3 | Minute Maid Park | 3:46 | 43,378 |
| 3 | October 7 | Houston Astros – 3, Tampa Bay Rays – 10 | Tropicana Field | 3:37 | 32,251 |
| 4 | October 8 | Houston Astros – 1, Tampa Bay Rays – 4 | Tropicana Field | 3:49 | 32,178 |
| 5 | October 10 | Tampa Bay Rays – 1, Houston Astros – 6 | Minute Maid Park | 3:12 | 43,418 |

This was the first postseason meeting between the Astros and Rays. The Astros defeated the Rays in five games to return to the ALCS for the third year in a row.

Justin Verlander pitched seven solid innings for the Astros as they took Game 1. Gerrit Cole outdueled Tampa Bay’s Blake Snell in a Game 2 pitcher’s duel as the Astros took a 2–0 series lead headed to St. Petersburg. In Game 3, the Rays’ offense came alive as Kevin Kiermaier, Ji-man Choi, Brandon Lowe, and Willy Adames all homered in a blowout win. Tommy Pham and Adames got to Verlander early in Game 4 as the Rays forced a decisive fifth game back in Houston. In Game 5, Cole once again shined on the mound as he outdueled Tyler Glasnow in a 6-1 Astros win.

Both teams would meet again in the ALCS the next year, which the Rays won in seven games before falling in the World Series after the Astros came back from a 3–0 series deficit to force a seventh game.

=== (2) New York Yankees vs. (3) Minnesota Twins ===
New York won the series, 3–0.

| Game | Date | Score | Location | Time | Attendance |
|---|---|---|---|---|---|
| 1 | October 4 | Minnesota Twins – 4, New York Yankees – 10 | Yankee Stadium | 4:15 | 49,233 |
| 2 | October 5 | Minnesota Twins – 2, New York Yankees – 8 | Yankee Stadium | 3:34 | 49,277 |
| 3 | October 7 | New York Yankees – 5, Minnesota Twins – 1 | Target Field | 4:02 | 41,121 |

This was the sixth postseason match-up between the Yankees and Twins (2003, 2004, 2009, 2010, 2017). This was just the second time the ALDS featured a match-up of two 100-win teams, following the 2018 ALDS between the Yankees and Red Sox. The Yankees once again swept the Twins to advance to the ALCS for the fifth time in ten years.

The series started out in nightmarish fashion for the Twins, as the Yankees’ offense overwhelmed the Twins’ pitching staff in back-to-back blowout wins to take a 2–0 series lead headed to Minneapolis. Gleyber Torres ignited the Yankees’ offense in Game 3 as they won 5-1 to complete yet another sweep of the Twins.

With the win, the Yankees improved their postseason record against the Twins to 6-0, the most lopsided record in a common matchup in the MLB postseason. The loss gave Minnesota its 16th straight postseason defeat, 13 of those in games against the Yankees; and their 28th straight year without winning the title. The Twins became the ninth 100+ win team to be swept in the postseason and the first since the 2004 St. Louis Cardinals.

== National League Division Series ==
=== (1) Los Angeles Dodgers vs. (4) Washington Nationals ===
Washington won the series, 3–2.

| Game | Date | Score | Location | Time | Attendance |
|---|---|---|---|---|---|
| 1 | October 3 | Washington Nationals – 0, Los Angeles Dodgers – 6 | Dodger Stadium | 3:23 | 53,095 |
| 2 | October 4 | Washington Nationals – 4, Los Angeles Dodgers – 2 | Dodger Stadium | 3:37 | 53,086 |
| 3 | October 6 | Los Angeles Dodgers – 10, Washington Nationals – 4 | Nationals Park | 3:58 | 43,423 |
| 4 | October 7 | Los Angeles Dodgers – 1, Washington Nationals – 6 | Nationals Park | 3:24 | 36,847 |
| 5 | October 9 | Washington Nationals – 7, Los Angeles Dodgers – 3 (10) | Dodger Stadium | 4:06 | 54,159 |

This was the third postseason meeting between the Dodgers and Nationals. The Nationals upset the 106-win Dodgers in five games to return to the NLCS for the first time since 1981, when the team was then known as the Montreal Expos.

Walker Buehler pitched six innings of shutout ball as the Dodgers shut out the Nationals in Game 1. In Game 2, Stephen Strasburg out-dueled Clayton Kershaw as the Nationals prevailed by two runs to even the series headed to the nation's capital. The Dodgers blew out the Nationals in Game 3 to regain the series lead. Max Scherzer pitched seven solid innings in Game 4 as the Nationals won 6–1 to even the series headed back to Los Angeles. In Game 5, the Dodgers jumped out to an early 3–0 lead, but it would not hold as the Nationals put up three unanswered runs in the sixth and eighth innings respectively to force extras. Howie Kendrick then won the series for the Nationals in the top of the tenth with a grand slam, giving the Nationals a 7–3 victory.

=== (2) Atlanta Braves vs. (3) St. Louis Cardinals ===
St. Louis won the series, 3–2.

| Game | Date | Score | Location | Time | Attendance |
|---|---|---|---|---|---|
| 1 | October 3 | St. Louis Cardinals – 7, Atlanta Braves – 6 | SunTrust Park | 4:07 | 42,631 |
| 2 | October 4 | St. Louis Cardinals – 0, Atlanta Braves – 3 | SunTrust Park | 2:46 | 42,911 |
| 3 | October 6 | Atlanta Braves – 3, St. Louis Cardinals – 1 | Busch Stadium | 3:22 | 46,701 |
| 4 | October 7 | Atlanta Braves – 4, St. Louis Cardinals – 5 (10) | Busch Stadium | 4:06 | 42,203 |
| 5 | October 9 | St. Louis Cardinals – 13, Atlanta Braves – 1 | SunTrust Park | 3:17 | 43,122 |

This was the fifth postseason meeting between the Cardinals and Braves. The Cardinals defeated the Braves in five games to advance to the NLCS for the first time since 2014.

The Cardinals took Game 1 in an offensive slugfest. Mike Foltynewicz pitched seven innings of shutout ball in Game 2 as the Braves won 3-0 to tie the series at 1-1 headed to St. Louis. In Game 3, the Cardinals led 1-0 after eight innings, but the Braves put up three unanswered runs in the top of the ninth, capped off by a two-run RBI single from Adam Duvall, to take the series lead. Game 4 went into extra innings, and would be won by the Cardinals thanks to a sacrifice fly from Yadier Molina, sending the series back to Atlanta. In Game 5, the Cardinals struck with ten runs in the top of the first as they prevailed in a blowout win to advance to the NLCS.

With the win, the Cardinals moved up to 4–1 against the Braves in the postseason, having won in 1982, 2000, and 2012. To date, this is the last time the Cardinals won a playoff series.

== American League Championship Series ==
=== (1) Houston Astros vs. (2) New York Yankees ===
Houston won the series, 4–2.

| Game | Date | Score | Location | Time | Attendance |
|---|---|---|---|---|---|
| 1 | October 12 | New York Yankees – 7, Houston Astros – 0 | Minute Maid Park | 3:11 | 43,311 |
| 2 | October 13 | New York Yankees – 2, Houston Astros – 3 (11) | Minute Maid Park | 4:49 | 43,359 |
| 3 | October 15 | Houston Astros – 4, New York Yankees – 1 | Yankee Stadium | 3:44 | 48,998 |
| 4 | October 17 | Houston Astros – 8, New York Yankees – 3 | Yankee Stadium | 4:19 | 49,067 |
| 5 | October 18 | Houston Astros – 1, New York Yankees – 4 | Yankee Stadium | 2:59 | 48,483 |
| 6 | October 19 | New York Yankees – 4, Houston Astros – 6 | Minute Maid Park | 4:09 | 43,357 |

This was the third postseason meeting between the Yankees and Astros. The previous two meetings (2015, 2017) were won by the Astros. History once again repeated itself, and the Astros defeated the Yankees in six games to return to the World Series for the second time in three years.

Masahiro Tanaka pitched six shutout innings as the Yankees blew out the Astros in Game 1. In Game 2, the Astros prevailed after eleven innings thanks to a walk-off home run from Carlos Correa. In the Bronx, the Astros stole Game 3 on the road as Gerrit Cole pitched seven shutout innings. In Game 4, the Astros blew out the Yankees to take a 3–1 series lead. Game 4 would ultimately be CC Sabathia’s final postseason game, as he was taken off the team’s postseason roster due to injury and retired after the conclusion of the ALCS. James Paxton pitched six strong innings as the Yankees sent the series back to Houston with a 4–1 win in Game 5, but the Astros ultimately capped off the series with a walk-off two-run home run by Jose Altuve off Aroldis Chapman in the bottom of the ninth inning of Game 6, securing the pennant.

With the series loss, this marked the first decade since the 1910s that the Yankees failed to win the AL pennant and a New York City team failed to win a World Series as the Mets lost in 2015. The Yankees would eventually win the pennant again in 2024 over the now-Cleveland Guardians in five games before falling in the World Series.

The Astros became just the second team to ever defeat the Yankees in three consecutive postseason series, joining the Detroit Tigers, who previously did it in 2006, 2011, and 2012. The Astros returned to the ALCS the next year, but fell to the Tampa Bay Rays in seven games despite coming back from a three games to none series deficit to force a seventh game. They would win their next pennant in 2021 against the Boston Red Sox in six games before coming up short in the World Series.

The Astros and Yankees would meet in the ALCS once more in 2022, which the Astros won in a sweep en route to a World Series title.

== National League Championship Series ==
=== (4) Washington Nationals vs. (3) St. Louis Cardinals ===
Washington won the series, 4–0.

| Game | Date | Score | Location | Time | Attendance |
|---|---|---|---|---|---|
| 1 | October 11 | Washington Nationals – 2, St. Louis Cardinals – 0 | Busch Stadium | 3:24 | 45,075 |
| 2 | October 12 | Washington Nationals – 3, St. Louis Cardinals – 1 | Busch Stadium | 2:53 | 46,458 |
| 3 | October 14 | St. Louis Cardinals – 1, Washington Nationals – 8 | Nationals Park | 3:26 | 43,675 |
| 4 | October 15 | St. Louis Cardinals – 4, Washington Nationals – 7 | Nationals Park | 3:02 | 43,976 |

This was the second postseason meeting between the Nationals and Cardinals. This NLCS marked the first time that the Nationals franchise had ever played in a best-of-seven playoff series. The Nationals swept the Cardinals to reach the World Series for the first time in franchise history.

This series was heavily lopsided in favor of the Nationals. Aníbal Sánchez pitched seven solid innings as the Nationals shut out the Cardinals 2–0 to take Game 1 on the road. The Nationals would also win Game 2 thanks to a solid pitching performance from Max Scherzer. By holding the Cardinals hitless through the first five innings of each of their starts, Scherzer and Sánchez repeated a feat they accomplished in Games 1 and 2 of the 2013 ALCS as members of the Detroit Tigers, a feat no other pair of pitchers has ever accomplished in the postseason. When the series shifted to the nation's capital, the Nationals blew out the Cardinals in Game 3 to take a 3–0 series lead. In Game 4, the Nationals jumped out to a 7–0 lead early, and despite the Cardinals cutting their lead to three after the fifth inning, the Nationals held on to secure their first and only NL pennant.

As of 2026, this remains the only pennant won by the Nationals. With the Nationals’ victory in the NLCS, every National League team has made an appearance in the World Series, and the only team left in Major League Baseball that has yet to win a pennant are the Seattle Mariners, who have not won one since their inception in 1977.

As of 2026, this is the last postseason appearance outside of the Wild Card round for the Cardinals.

== 2019 World Series ==
=== (AL1) Houston Astros vs. (NL4) Washington Nationals ===
Washington won the series, 4–3.

| Game | Date | Score | Location | Time | Attendance |
|---|---|---|---|---|---|
| 1 | October 22 | Washington Nationals – 5, Houston Astros – 4 | Minute Maid Park | 3:43 | 43,339 |
| 2 | October 23 | Washington Nationals – 12, Houston Astros – 3 | Minute Maid Park | 4:01 | 43,357 |
| 3 | October 25 | Houston Astros – 4, Washington Nationals – 1 | Nationals Park | 4:03 | 43,867 |
| 4 | October 26 | Houston Astros – 8, Washington Nationals – 1 | Nationals Park | 3:48 | 43,889 |
| 5 | October 27 | Houston Astros – 7, Washington Nationals – 1 | Nationals Park | 3:19 | 43,910 |
| 6 | October 29 | Washington Nationals – 7, Houston Astros – 2 | Minute Maid Park | 3:37 | 43,384 |
| 7 | October 30 | Washington Nationals – 6, Houston Astros – 2 | Minute Maid Park | 3:42 | 43,326 |

This was the second World Series to feature two expansion teams, as well as the first World Series since 1933 to be played in Washington, D.C., when the Washington Senators fell to the then-New York Giants in five games. In a significant upset given their regular season win differential, the 93-win Nationals defeated the heavily-favored 107-win Astros in seven games to win their first championship in franchise history.

This was the first championship series in the history of North American sports in which neither team won a home game. In Game 1, behind home runs from Ryan Zimmerman and Juan Soto, the Nationals overcame an early Astros lead to win by one run. Stephen Strasburg pitched six solid innings as the Nationals blew out the Astros in Game 2 to take a 2–0 series lead headed to the nation’s capital, winning their eight straight postseason game. In the first World Series game played in Washington, D.C. in 85 years, the Astros won by three runs to get on the board in the series. José Urquidy pitched five innings of shutout ball as the Astros blew out the Nationals to even the series, capped off by a grand slam by Alex Bregman in the top of the seventh. Gerrit Cole pitched seven solid innings as the Astros again blew out the Nationals to take a 3–2 series lead back home to Houston, becoming the first team since the New York Yankees in 1996 to win three straight World Series games on the road. In Game 6, Strasburg pitched eight strong innings as the Nationals blew out the Astros to force a seventh game after a controversial interference call and ejection. In Game 7, the Astros held a 2–0 lead going into the top of the seventh and were eight outs away from the championship, when the Nationals’ Anthony Rendon hit a solo home run to cut the Astros’ lead to one. Then, Howie Kendrick hit a two-run home run to put the Nationals in the lead for good. The Nationals then scored three more unanswered runs in the top of the eighth and ninth innings to secure the title.

This was the first World Series title for the nation's capital since 1924, when the Senators defeated the Giants in seven games. Despite the win, no MLB team from the nation's capital had won a home game in the World Series since 1933. In 2023, the Nationals’ upset of the Astros was ranked as the third biggest upset in World Series history by MLB.com. To date, this is the last postseason appearance by the Nationals franchise.

The Astros returned to the World Series in 2021, but were defeated by the Atlanta Braves in six games. The Astros would win their next and most recent championship in 2022 over the Philadelphia Phillies in six games.

== Broadcasting ==
This was sixth year of eight-year U.S. TV contracts with ESPN, Fox Sports, and TBS. ESPN aired the American League Wild Card Game, Fox Sports 1 and MLB Network split the American League Division Series, and the Fox broadcast network and Fox Sports 1 split the American League Championship Series. TBS had the National League Wild Card Game, Division Series, and Championship Series, with sister network TNT used as an overflow channel. The World Series then aired on the Fox broadcast network for the twentieth consecutive year.
