= Michael A. Taylor =

American baseball player (born 1991)

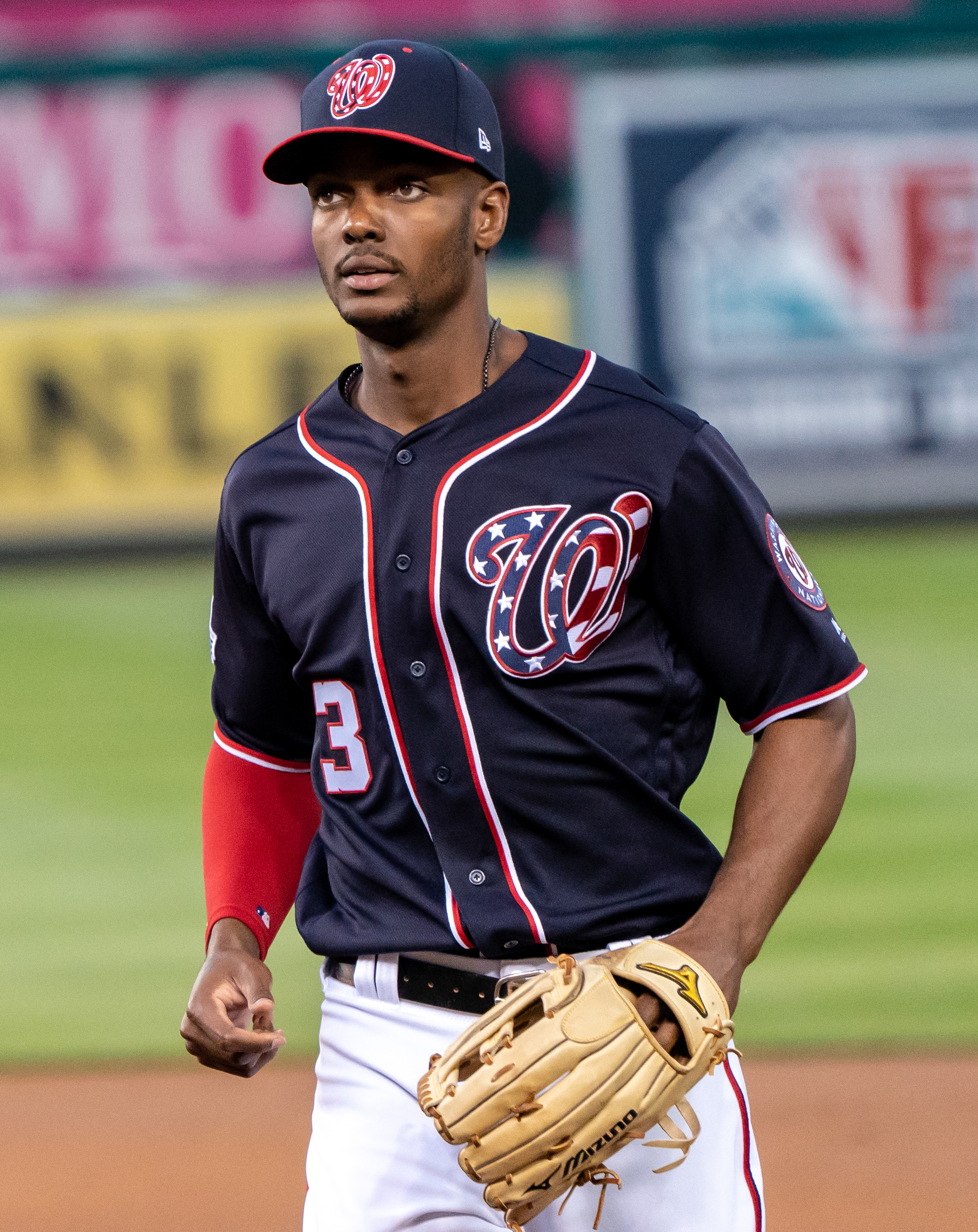
- Taylor with the Washington Nationals in 2018
- Center fielder
- Born: March 26, 1991 (age 35); Lake Forest, Illinois, U.S.
- Batted: Right Threw: Right

MLB debut
- August 12, 2014, for the Washington Nationals

Last MLB appearance
- September 28, 2025, for the Chicago White Sox

MLB statistics
- Batting average: .232
- Home runs: 109
- Runs batted in: 388
- Stolen bases: 128
- Stats at Baseball Reference

Teams
- Washington Nationals (2014–2020); Kansas City Royals (2021–2022); Minnesota Twins (2023); Pittsburgh Pirates (2024); Chicago White Sox (2025)

Career highlights and awards
- World Series champion (2019); Gold Glove Award (2021)

Michael Anthony Taylor (born March 26, 1991) is an American former professional baseball center fielder. He played in Major League Baseball (MLB) for the Washington Nationals, Kansas City Royals, Minnesota Twins, Pittsburgh Pirates, and Chicago White Sox.

Taylor was selected by the Nationals in the sixth round of the 2009 MLB draft, made his MLB debut with them in 2014, and was a member of the 2019 World Series championship team. He spent most of his career with the Nationals, where he was a strong performer in postseason play. In 2017, he became the first MLB player in history with four or more RBIs in back-to-back playoff games. In 2019, he helped spark the team's comeback in the Wild Card Game and contributed throughout their World Series-winning postseason run. Generally considered an elite defender, he won a Gold Glove Award and Fielding Bible Award in 2021.

== Early life and education ==
Taylor was born to military parents; his father, Anthony Taylor, was a logistics officer for 22 years in the U.S. Army. Taylor has four older sisters. He attended Westminster Academy in Fort Lauderdale, Florida, and played for the school's baseball team. One teammate was Matt den Dekker, with whom he would play for the Washington Nationals in the 2015 and 2016 seasons.

== Playing career ==
=== Washington Nationals ===
==== 2009–13 ====
The Washington Nationals selected Taylor in the sixth round of the 2009 Major League Baseball draft. He forwent a commitment to the University of North Florida to go professional with the Nationals. Taylor did not make his minor league debut in the 2009 season but served as a versatile infielder for the Gulf Coast League Nationals in 2010, committing 21 errors across three positions: shortstop, second baseman, and third baseman. He appeared in 38 games and batted .195 with one home run.

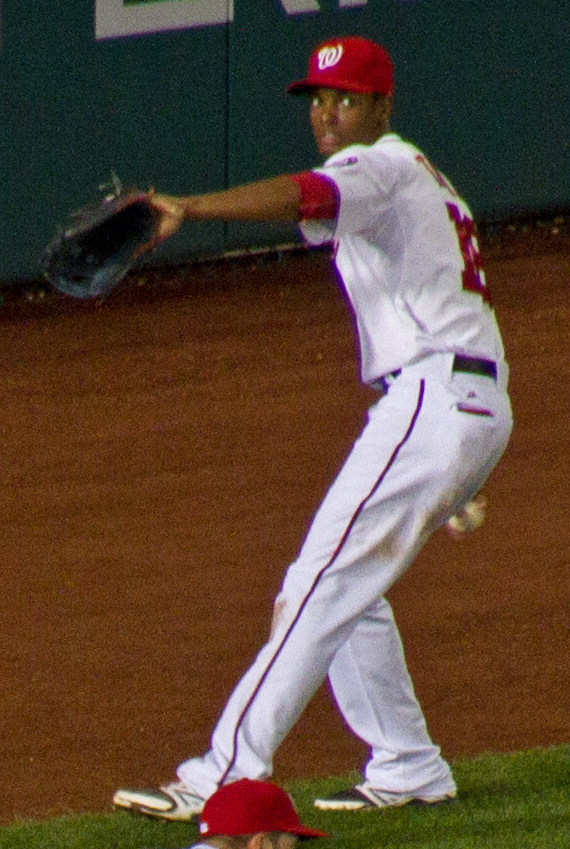
Taylor in his rookie season

At the beginning of fall instructional league play in 2010, Taylor was told he would be switching positions from shortstop to center fielder, after a hand injury had limited his development in the infield in his first year in the Nationals' minor league system. Beginning at the Single-A Hagerstown Suns in 2011, Taylor exclusively appeared as an outfielder, a trend that continued with the High-A Potomac Nationals in 2012 and 2013. His offensive output improved as well, as he batted .263 with 10 home runs in 133 games with Potomac in 2013, earning him honors as the team's Player of the Year, before heading to Puerto Rican winter baseball to play for the Indios de Mayaguez.

Taylor was added to the Washington Nationals' 40-man roster on November 20, 2013, after the end of the 2013 season. At the time, he ranked as the Nationals' fourth-best prospect according to MLB Pipeline, and seventh-best according to Baseball America.

==== 2014 season ====
On August 10, Taylor was called up by the Nationals when Steven Souza was placed on the 15-day disabled list. On August 12, he made his Major League debut against the New York Mets in Citi Field, where he collected his first major league hit, a single off pitcher Rafael Montero. He also hit his first major league home run, a two-run homer against pitcher Carlos Torres, that night. Taylor was optioned back to the Triple-A Syracuse Chiefs on August 23, after the Nationals selected veteran Nate Schierholtz's contract. He was again recalled after rosters expanded in September and was in center field on September 28, in the final game of the 2014 regular season, when Jordan Zimmermann completed the first no-hitter in Nationals history.

Taylor was ranked third among Nationals prospects by the end of 2014 by MLB Pipeline and second by Baseball America.

==== 2015 season ====
Taylor opened the 2015 season as the Nationals' starting center fielder while Denard Span was on the disabled list. Despite starting the season well by sporting a .279 batting average, he was optioned to the Triple-A Syracuse Chiefs on April 19 to make room on the active roster for Span. He was recalled on April 29 when Reed Johnson was placed on the disabled list. During an away game against the Arizona Diamondbacks on May 13, Taylor substituted for right fielder Bryce Harper after Harper was ejected in the seventh inning. In his first at-bat in the ninth inning, he came up with the bases loaded for the first time in his career and hit a go-ahead grand slam, effectively clinching the game for the Nationals.

On August 20, Taylor hit the second-longest home run of the 2015 MLB season, crushing a pitch from Colorado Rockies starter Yohan Flande 493 feet into the stands at Coors Field. Taylor suffered a right knee injury on August 27 after slamming into the wall while attempting to run down a line drive off the bat of Melvin Upton, Jr., but he was healthy enough to make a pinch-hitting appearance in the tenth inning against the Atlanta Braves on September 4. He hit a three-run home run for a walk-off victory over the visiting Braves.

On September 8, Taylor hit a "Little League grand slam" off of New York Mets pitcher Matt Harvey after a bases-loaded single got by center fielder Yoenis Céspedes and went to the wall. He was not credited with an inside-the-park home run, with an error being charged to Céspedes on the play. Taylor himself allowed an inside-the-park grand slam on a similar play just weeks later, as he dove and missed a ball hit by Philadelphia Phillies rookie Aaron Altherr in a September 25 game, unloading the bases and allowing Altherr to score on his own hit. The play was scored a home run for Altherr.

Taylor finished the 2015 season batting .229/.282/.358 with 14 home runs, 16 stolen bases, and a .640 on-base plus slugging percentage in 472 at bats over 138 games.

==== 2016 season ====
Taylor opened the 2016 season as the Washington Nationals' fourth outfielder, but an Opening Day injury to starting center fielder Ben Revere quickly thrust him into an everyday spot in the lineup.

On June 22, Taylor had what a writer for the New England Sports Network described as possibly "the worst game in baseball history." He had five swinging strikeouts against the Los Angeles Dodgers and a fielding error that cost the Nationals the game when he failed to get his glove to the ground in time while charging a routine groundball hit by Yasiel Puig in the bottom of the ninth inning. The Nationals were up by one run, 3–2, and the error resulted in Taylor's future Nationals teammate Howie Kendrick, who was on first base for the Dodgers at the time, and Puig both scoring for a walk-off Los Angeles victory.

Taylor was optioned to the Syracuse Chiefs to make room for the reactivation of closer Jonathan Papelbon on July 4, but he was recalled after appearing in just one game for the Chiefs after first baseman Ryan Zimmerman was placed on the disabled list on July 8. Taylor's return to the major leagues was short-lived, however, as he was optioned back to Syracuse after going 0-for-4 with two strikeouts in a loss against the San Diego Padres on July 24.

Taylor rejoined the major league team after a little more than a month with the Chiefs, where he posted a meager .205 batting average over 31 games, being recalled August 29. He found himself once again relegated to a bench role, with rookie Trea Turner taking over in center field for the ineffectual Revere. He finished out the season batting .231./278/.376 with a .654 on-base plus slugging percentage, seven home runs, and 16 stolen bases in 221 at bats in 76 major league games, and he was among the players named to the Nationals' playoff roster in the 2016 National League Division Series, where he received two at-bats and struck out in both appearances.

==== 2017 season ====
Coming off what he described as a "pretty disappointing" 2016 season, Taylor found himself in the familiar role of backup outfielder for the Nationals in the 2017 season, with Adam Eaton taking over in center field and Trea Turner shifting to the shortstop position. However, for the third straight season, Taylor found himself in the role of everyday center fielder after the presumptive starter was injured early in the year, with Eaton tearing ligaments in his knee while running the bases in late April. Given regular playing time, Taylor resurrected a batting average that had hovered below .200 in limited appearances prior to Eaton's season-ending injury, hitting .290 in May and June while demonstrating above-average power.

Taylor landed on the major league disabled list for the first time in his career on July 7 with an oblique strain. He spent more than a month on the disabled list, with rookie Brian Goodwin taking over as the Nationals' regular center fielder in Taylor's absence. Upon Taylor's return to the team on August 13, after rehab assignments with the minor league Potomac Nationals and Harrisburg Senators, Taylor reclaimed his spot in the starting lineup.

Two years to the day after his "Little League grand slam" against the New York Mets, on September 8, 2017, Taylor hit a bases-loaded line drive to center field off Philadelphia Phillies pitcher Jake Thompson that a leaping Odúbel Herrera was unable to snare. Taylor circled the bases on the play, which was scored an inside-the-park grand slam — the first in Major League Baseball since Aaron Altherr's on September 25, 2015. In the same game, Taylor also singled twice and tripled, driving in a total of five runs, and recorded an outfield assist at home to preserve the Nationals' lead in the eventual 11–10 victory. Taylor finished the regular season batting .271/.320/.486 with 19 home runs, 53 RBIs, and 17 stolen bases in 399 at bats.

In Game 4 of the 2017 NLDS against the Chicago Cubs, Taylor hit a grand slam to put the Nationals ahead 5–0 and stave off elimination. It was the first grand slam in Nationals post-season history. Taylor hit a go-ahead three-run homer on the second inning of Game 5 (which the Nationals ultimately lost 9–8).

==== 2018 season ====
In 2018 Taylor struggled at the plate to start the season, batting .223 in April and .183 in May, but hit his stride in June, batting .444. He also led the major leagues in stolen bases as late as June 21. However, Taylor lost significant playing time due to the return of Adam Eaton and the strong performance of Juan Soto, relegating Taylor to fourth outfielder status. Taylor struggled again at the plate with limited playing time in the second half of the season, and finished 2018 batting .227/.287/.357, with six home runs, 28 RBIs, and 24 stolen bases in 363 at bats.

In the 2018–2019 offseason, Taylor worked with Nationals hitting coach Kevin Long to change his stance and swing to generate more contact, and practiced his new swing in the Dominican Winter League. Nationals General Manager Mike Rizzo said in December 2018 that he believes Taylor could be a five-tool player if he can make more contact.

==== 2019 season ====
In June 2019, Taylor was sent down to Double-A Harrisburg for more consistent playing time to work on his offense. He was called back up to the major league roster in September and finished the regular season batting .250/.305/.364 with one home run and three RBIs in 97 plate appearances with the Nationals.

Taylor was a major contributor to the 2019 Nationals' playoff run. In the 2019 Wild Card Game, he pinch-hit for pitcher Stephen Strasburg and worked a 3-2 count before drawing a hit by pitch from Josh Hader, sparking the 8th inning rally which culminated in Taylor scoring on Juan Soto's bases-clearing, go-ahead double. When center fielder Victor Robles was sidelined with an injury in NLDS Game 2, Taylor took over as the starting center fielder for the remainder of the series, getting a hit in each game and securing the series-winning out with a diving catch in Game 5. He also started the first two games of the NLCS, going 2-for-4 with a home run in Game 2.

In Game 2 of the 2019 World Series, Taylor hit a solo home run in the top of the ninth, becoming the 39th player to homer in his first ever World Series at-bat. With the home run the Nationals became the first team in World Series history to have a home run in the seventh, eighth and ninth innings of a game.

==== 2020 season ====
After batting .196/.253/.424 with five home runs and 16 RBIs over 38 games in the shortened 2020 season, Taylor was placed on outright waivers by the Nationals. The team announced October 15, 2020, that he had cleared waivers and elected free agency rather than accept an assignment to the minor leagues.

=== Kansas City Royals (2021–2022) ===
On November 30, 2020, Taylor signed a one-year contract worth $1.75 million with the Kansas City Royals.

In 2021, Taylor batted .244/.297/.356 with 12 home runs and 54 RBIs while playing a career high 142 games. He won a Gold Glove Award and a Fielding Bible Award as a center fielder, having led all AL center fielders with 11 assists and ranked third with 351 putouts and a .992 fielding percentage. At the end of the season, the Royals signed Taylor to a two-year, $9 million contract extension.

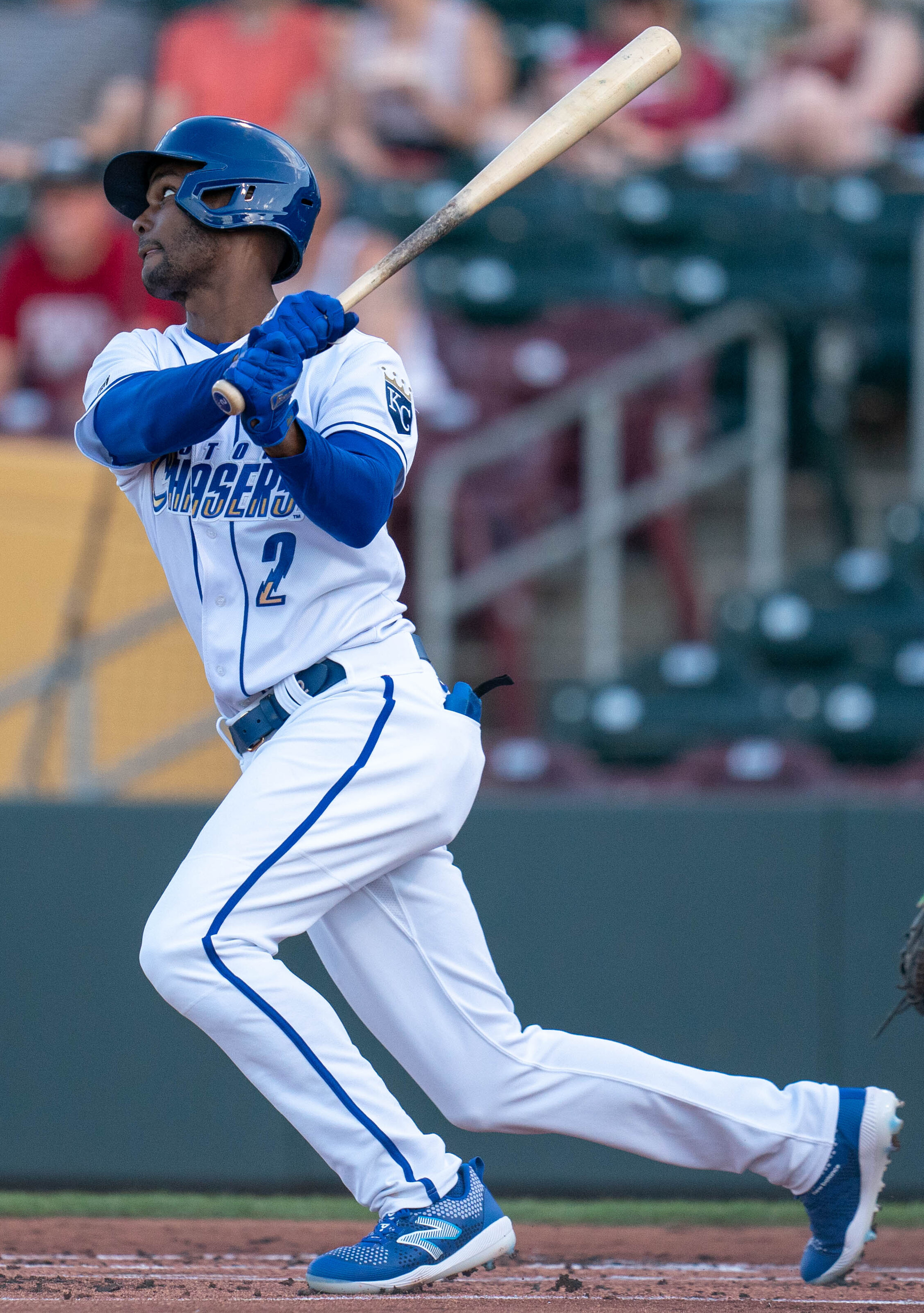
Taylor with the Omaha Storm Chasers in 2022

In 2022, Taylor played in 124 games for Kansas City, hitting .254/.313/.357 with 9 home runs and 43 RBI.

=== Minnesota Twins ===
On January 23, 2023, the Royals traded Taylor to the Minnesota Twins in exchange for minor league pitchers Steven Cruz and Evan Sisk. In 129 appearances for Minnesota, he slashed .220/.278/.442 with a career-high 21 home runs, 51 RBI, and 13 stolen bases. Taylor became a free agent following the season.

=== Pittsburgh Pirates ===
On March 16, 2024, Taylor signed a one-year, $4 million contract with the Pittsburgh Pirates. He played in 113 games for Pittsburgh, slashing .193/.253/.290 with five home runs, 21 RBI, and 12 stolen bases. Taylor was designated for assignment by the Pirates on September 24. He was released the next day.

=== Chicago White Sox ===
On February 12, 2025, Taylor signed a one-year, $1.95 million contract with the Chicago White Sox. In 134 appearances for the White Sox, he batted .200/.259/.366 with nine home runs, 35 RBI, and eight stolen bases. Taylor announced his retirement on the final day of the season.

==== Retirement ====
Taylor announced his retirement to members of the media on September 28, 2025, before the final game of the season versus the Washington Nationals at Nationals Park, a place he played for many years. He said he had decided a few months earlier to retire to spend more time with his family, though he was interested in coaching down the road. “To be able to play my last games of my career here in this ballpark in front of these fans, it’s just the icing on the cake,” Taylor said. He received multiple standing ovations from the Nationals Park crowd.

== Post-playing career ==
After his retirement, Taylor was hired as an outfield instructor for the Minnesota Twins prior to the 2026 season to work under new manager Derek Shelton, whom we had played under with the Pirates. Shelton noted that as a player with the Pirates, Taylor had helped coach Oneil Cruz for his move from shortstop to center field, even though the shift came at the expense of Taylor's playing time. “I think it just speaks to the quality of human being," Shelton said.

== Personal life ==
He is married to his wife Brianna and has two children.

Taylor used his middle initial during his playing career to honor his father Anthony, who died in 2017.
