= Trea Turner =

American baseball player (born 1993)

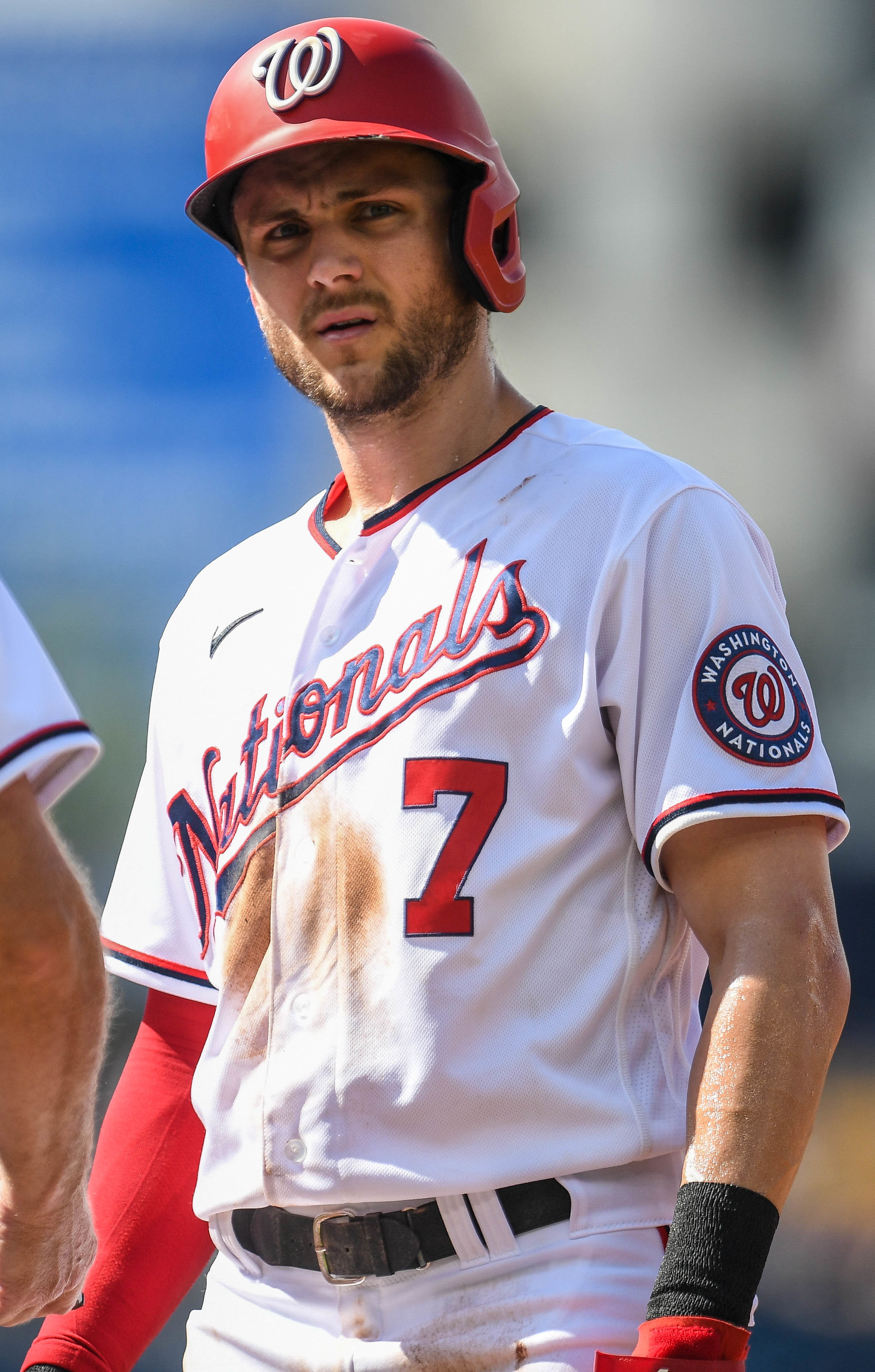
- Turner with the Washington Nationals in 2021

Philadelphia Phillies – No. 7
- Shortstop
- Born: June 30, 1993 (age 33); Boynton Beach, Florida, U.S.
- Bats: Right Throws: Right

MLB debut
- August 21, 2015, for the Washington Nationals

MLB statistics (through 2026 season)
- Batting average: .291
- Hits: 1,687
- Home runs: 205
- Runs batted in: 699
- Stolen bases: 336
- Stats at Baseball Reference

Teams
- Washington Nationals (2015–2021); Los Angeles Dodgers (2021–2022); Philadelphia Phillies (2023–present)

Career highlights and awards
- MLB: 3× All-Star (2021, 2022, 2024); World Series champion (2019); All-MLB First Team (2022); Silver Slugger Award (2022); 2× NL batting champion (2021, 2025); 2× NL stolen base leader (2018, 2021); International: All-WBC Team (2023)
Medals
Men's baseball
Representing the United States
World Baseball Classic
Silver medal – second place	2023 Miami	Team
Haarlem Baseball Week
Bronze medal – third place	2012	Team

Trea Vance Turner (born June 30, 1993) is an American professional baseball shortstop for the Philadelphia Phillies of Major League Baseball (MLB). He has previously played for the Washington Nationals and Los Angeles Dodgers. At the international level, he plays for the United States national team.

Turner played college baseball at North Carolina State. The San Diego Padres selected him in the first round of the 2014 MLB draft and traded him to the Washington Nationals in 2015. Though developed as a shortstop, Turner debuted in the major leagues in 2016 as Washington's starting center fielder and returned to shortstop for the 2017 season. Traded to the Dodgers during the 2021 season, he became a free agent after the 2022 season and signed an 11-year, $300 million contract with the Philadelphia Phillies.

Turner is a three-time MLB All-Star. He has led the National League in batting average twice and twice in stolen bases. Turner won a Silver Slugger Award in 2022 and has hit for the cycle three times, making him the fourth MLB player to accomplish the feat, after Bob Meusel, Babe Herman, and Adrián Beltré; Christian Yelich later became a member of the exclusive club as well. Turner set an MLB record in 2023 by stealing the most bases in a season without being caught (30 stolen bases, 0 caught stealing). He won the 2019 World Series with the Washington Nationals.

== Amateur career ==
Turner attended Park Vista Community High School in Lake Worth, Florida, where he played for his school's baseball team. Turner was lightly recruited by college programs, only receiving scholarship offers from North Carolina State University and Florida Atlantic University. The Pittsburgh Pirates selected Turner in the 20th round, with the 602nd overall selection, of the 2011 Major League Baseball (MLB) draft. Turner opted to play college baseball for the NC State Wolfpack baseball team in the Atlantic Coast Conference (ACC) the National Collegiate Athletic Association's Division I.

As a freshman in 2012, Turner switched positions from shortstop to third baseman. That year, he had a .336 batting average and a .432 on-base percentage and recorded 57 stolen bases while only being caught stealing four times. His 57 steals were more than the team totals of 158 Division I teams, and set an NC State record. He also tied the ACC record for steals in one game with five. Turner was named to the All-Tournament Team in the 2012 ACC Tournament.

In 2013, Turner had a .378 batting average with seven home runs, 41 runs batted in (RBIs), and 27 stolen bases. He was named to the All-ACC first team, and was named a second team All-American by Perfect Game and a third team All-American by the National Collegiate Baseball Writers Association and Baseball America. He was named a finalist for the Brooks Wallace Award, given to the best shortstop in NCAA's Division I. That summer, Turner played for the United States national collegiate baseball team. As a junior in 2014, he hit .321 with eight home runs and 26 stolen bases. After the season, he was named the winner of the Brooks Wallace Award.

== Professional career ==
=== Draft and minor leagues ===
Aaron Fitt of Baseball America considered Turner a likely first-round choice in the 2014 MLB draft. The San Diego Padres selected Turner in the first round, with the 13th overall selection. He signed on June 13, receiving a $2.9 million signing bonus. He made his professional debut three days later with the Eugene Emeralds of the Class A-Short Season Northwest League. After he batted .228 in 26 games for Eugene, the Padres promoted him to the Fort Wayne TinCaps of the Class A Midwest League, where he batted .369 in 46 games. The Padres assigned him to play for the Surprise Saguaros of the Arizona Fall League after the regular season.

On December 19, 2014, the Padres agreed to trade Turner to the Washington Nationals as a player to be named later as part of a three-team trade, in which the Padres traded Jake Bauers, Burch Smith, and René Rivera to the Tampa Bay Rays and Joe Ross to Washington, Washington traded Steven Souza and Travis Ott to Tampa Bay, and Tampa traded Wil Myers to San Diego. Turner stayed with the Padres organization until mid-June 2015 because he was ineligible to be traded for a year after being drafted.

In 2015, Turner reported to spring training with the Padres as a non-roster invitee, The Padres assigned him to the San Antonio Missions of the Class AA Texas League. He hit .322 with five home runs and 35 RBIs with 11 stolen bases for San Antonio. Meanwhile, MLB changed its rules so that players can be traded in the year they are drafted after the World Series concludes.

=== Washington Nationals ===
==== 2015: Major League debut ====
On June 14, 2015, the Padres sent Turner to the Nationals to complete the trade made in December, and the Nationals assigned him to the Harrisburg Senators of the Class AA Eastern League. After playing ten games for Harrisburg, the Nationals promoted Turner to the Syracuse Chiefs of the Class AAA International League. Turner represented the Nationals at the 2015 All-Star Futures Game in July.

On August 21, 2015, the Nationals promoted Turner to the major leagues. He made his MLB debut that night. Turner went nine at-bats before collecting his first MLB hit on September 3, beating out a ground ball to reach first base safely. He finished the 2015 season with a .225 batting average through 40 at-bats with one home run and one RBI.

==== 2016: Rookie of the Year runner-up ====
In spring training in 2016, Turner competed with Danny Espinosa and Stephen Drew to be the Nationals starting shortstop. The Nationals optioned Turner to Syracuse at the end of spring training. Turner was called up on June 3, 2016, for a three-game series against the Cincinnati Reds. He went 3-for-3 with a walk in his first game of the season in the major leagues, playing second base and shortstop. He was optioned back to Syracuse at the end of the series, as first baseman Ryan Zimmerman was reactivated from paternity leave.

With Michael A. Taylor and Ben Revere turning in lackluster offensive performances as the Nationals' primary center fielders and Espinosa performing well as the team's everyday shortstop, Turner began getting starts in center field with the Nationals midway through the season. He made his first appearance in center field on June 27; he had no previous experience as an outfielder. The Nationals recalled Turner in July, and he made his first major league start in center field on July 26.

Turner won the National League's (NL) Rookie of the Month Award for his performance in August 2016, hitting .357 on the month with five home runs and 11 stolen bases. He finished second in NL Rookie of the Year Award balloting to Corey Seager despite playing in only 73 of the 162 games that season.

==== 2017: Return to shortstop and injuries ====
In 2017, Turner moved back to his natural position of shortstop after the Nationals traded starting shortstop Danny Espinosa to the Los Angeles Angels and acquired Adam Eaton to play center field. On April 9, Turner was placed on the 10-day disabled list due to tightness in his hamstring. On April 25, Turner hit for the cycle against the Colorado Rockies. The following night, Turner came a triple shy of back-to-back cycles.

Turner stole four bases against the New York Mets in a June 18 game to set a personal best and tie Marquis Grissom (in 1992 for the Montreal Expos against the San Francisco Giants) for the franchise record. He tied the record again with four steals off the Chicago Cubs in just three innings on June 27, helping the Nationals to a team record of seven stolen bases in the game. Two days later, Turner was hit on the right wrist by a fastball from Cubs reliever Pedro Strop and suffered a non-displaced fracture, sending him to the 10-day disabled list for the second time in the season. Turner told The Washington Post's Thomas Boswell it was the first time since he was 12 that he had broken a bone, though he claimed the injury "didn't feel that bad" after Strop's pitch hit him, and he remained in the game for an inning and a half before being lifted for a defensive substitute. The Nationals purchased the contract of infielder Adrián Sánchez from the Class-AAA Syracuse Chiefs to take Turner's place on the roster. Turner was activated from the disabled list on August 28 and made his return to the lineup the following night against the Miami Marlins.

==== 2018: NL stolen bases leader ====
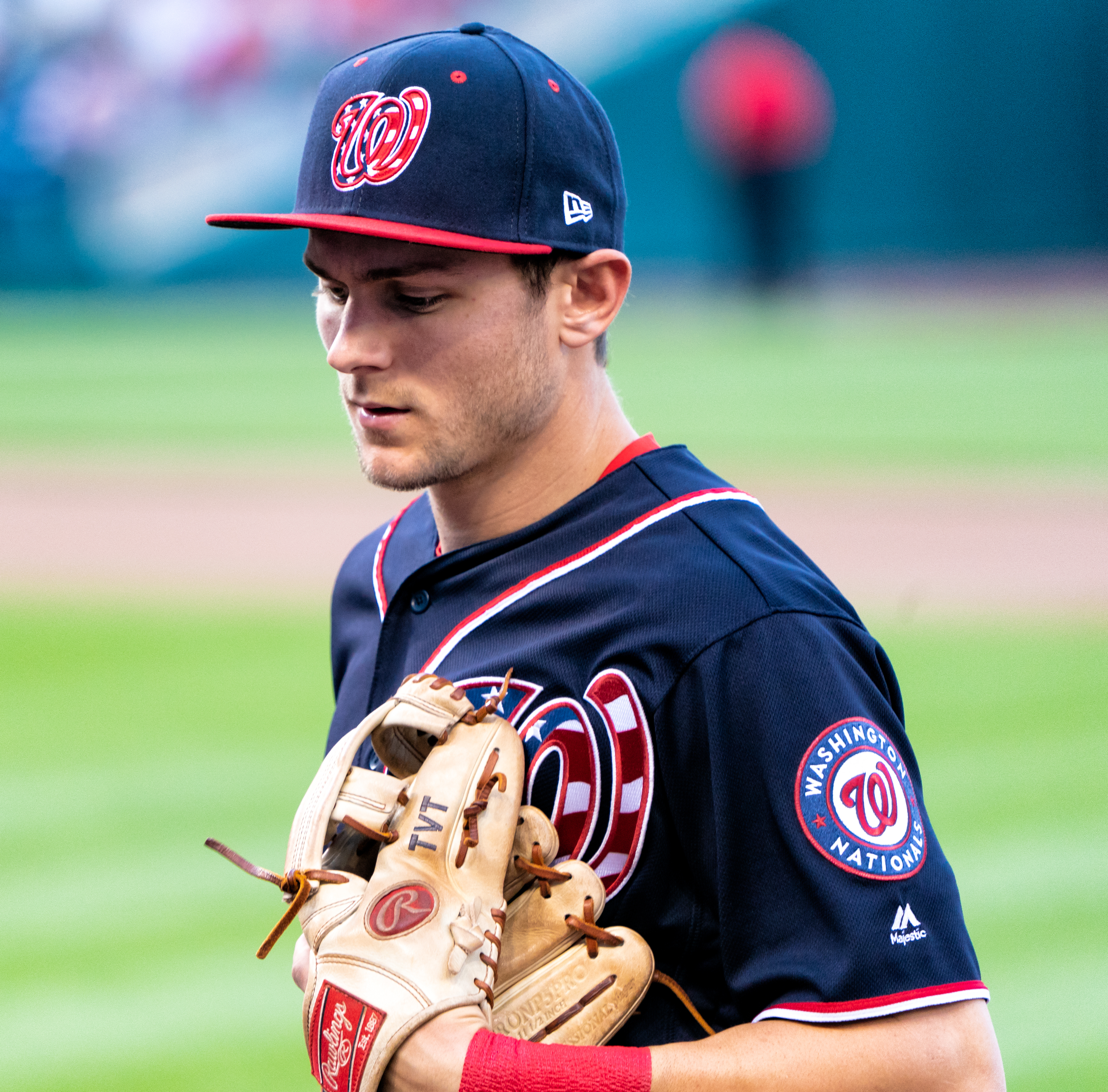
Turner in 2018

In 2018, Turner continued his climb toward stardom. On July 5, Turner had eight RBIs and hit his first career grand slam during a franchise-record 9-run comeback against the Miami Marlins. On July 8, Turner was announced as one of the five candidates in the 2018 All-Star Final Vote.

He finished the season with an NL-leading 43 stolen bases. For the season, he batted .271/.344/.416. He also was 3rd in the league in power-speed number (26.4). He had the fastest baserunning sprint speed of all major league shortstops, at 30.1 feet/second.

==== 2019: World Series championship ====
On April 2, 2019, Turner broke his right index finger while attempting to bunt against the Philadelphia Phillies; he did not play again until May 17. On July 23, Turner hit for the cycle for the second time in his career, and for the second time against the Colorado Rockies. This time it occurred at Nationals Park and was the first cycle ever hit against the Rockies away from Coors Field. During the 2019 regular season, Turner hit .298/.353/.497 with 19 home runs in 122 games. He finished second in the NL with 35 stolen bases, behind Ronald Acuña Jr. who had 37. Turner also recorded the fastest sprint speed of all major league shortstops, at 30.3 feet/second (9.2 meters/sec).

In the NL Wild Card Game, Turner hit his first career postseason home run off of Brandon Woodruff of the Milwaukee Brewers. The Nationals defeated the Brewers and went on to win the World Series over the Houston Astros, earning the first championship in franchise history. On November 16, Turner underwent surgery on his right index finger.

==== 2020: Seventh in NL MVP voting ====
In 2020, Turner batted .335/.394/.588 with 12 home runs in 59 games during the shortened 60-game season. He led the National League with 78 hits and four triples and led all shortstops in average, OBP, SLG, and wRC+. Turner finished 7th in NL MVP voting.

==== 2021: Last year in Washington and tying the MLB cycle record ====
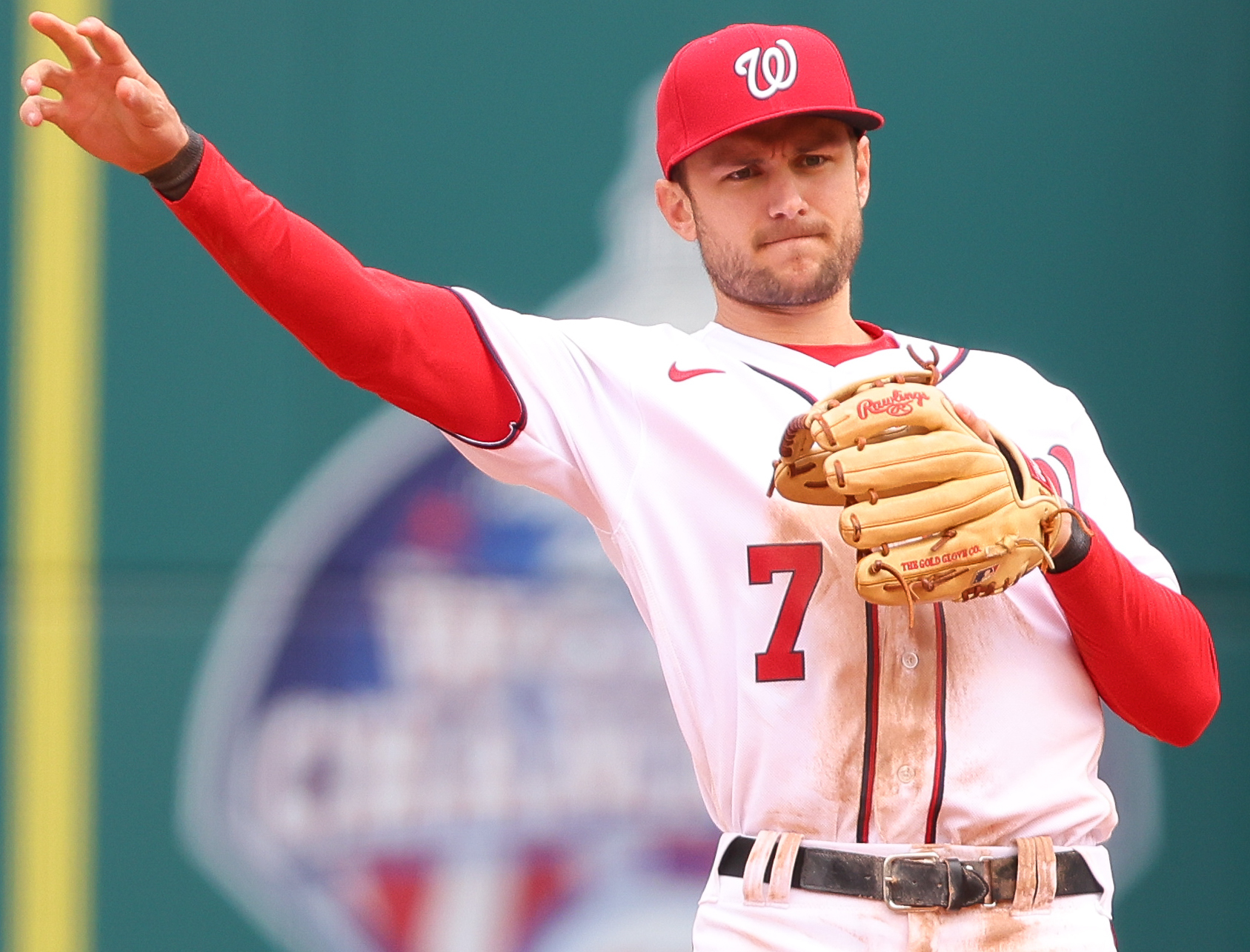
Turner with Washington in 2021.

On June 30, 2021 (Turner's 28th birthday) against the Tampa Bay Rays, Turner hit for the cycle a third time, tying the MLB record for career cycles with John Reilly, Bob Meusel, Babe Herman, Christian Yelich, and Adrián Beltré. He hit a single in the first inning, a double in the third inning, a home run in the fourth inning, and a triple in the sixth inning.

=== Los Angeles Dodgers ===
==== 2021: Batting championship and 100 career home runs ====
On July 30, 2021, Turner was traded to the Los Angeles Dodgers along with Max Scherzer in exchange for Josiah Gray, Keibert Ruiz, Gerardo Carrillo, and Donovan Casey. Starting as a shortstop for the team, Turner moved to second base when Corey Seager returned from the injured list. On September 26, 2021, Turner hit his 100th career home run off of Humberto Mejía of the Arizona Diamondbacks. Turner finished the 2021 season leading the majors with a .328 batting average and 195 base hits, his second consecutive season leading the major leagues in hits. He slashed .328/.375/.536 with a 145 OPS+. He also led the National League with 32 stolen bases and 319 total bases. He had the fastest sprint speed of all major league players, at 30.7 feet/second. With the Dodgers, he hit .338 with 10 homers, a 149 OPS+ and 11 steals. In the playoffs, he had two hits in four at-bats in the Wild Card Game, three hits in 22 at-bats (.136) in the 2021 NLDS and six hits in 25 at-bats (.240) with one steal in the 2021 NLCS.

==== 2022: All-Star and First Team All-MLB ====
On March 22, Turner signed a one-year, $21 million, contract with the Dodgers to avoid salary arbitration, and he returned to playing shortstop after Seager departed as a free agent. On July 8, 2022, Turner was named the starting shortstop for the 2022 All-Star Game. He recorded his 1,000th career hit on August 29, 2022, a 10th inning single off Marlins pitcher Huascar Brazoban.

For the season, Turner hit .298 with 21 home runs, 100 RBI, and 27 stolen bases. He also led the league in plate appearances (708) and at-bats (652) and led the majors with 33 infield hits.

=== Philadelphia Phillies ===
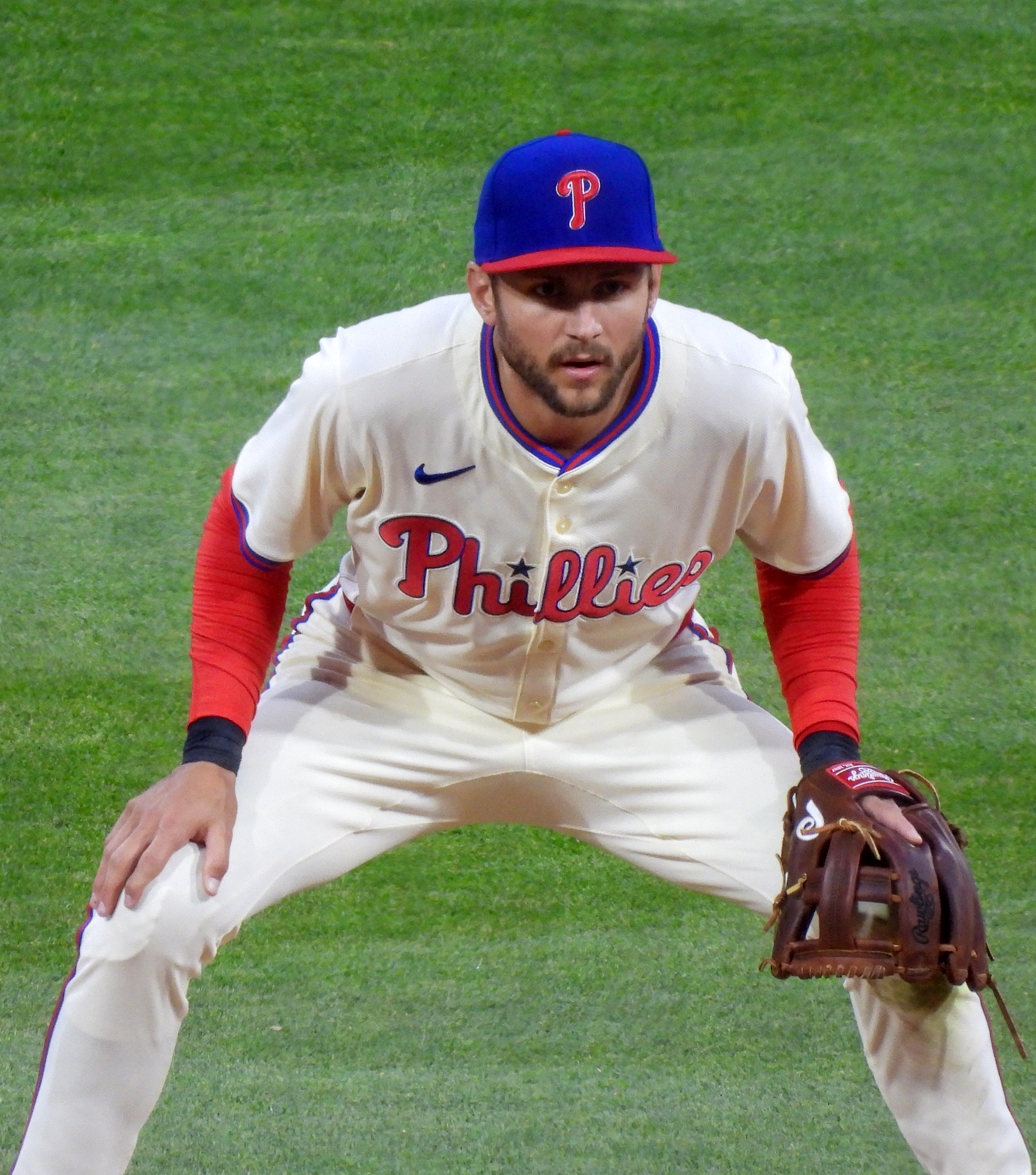
Turner in 2024

On December 8, 2022, Turner signed an 11-year contract worth $300 million with the Philadelphia Phillies. Turner struggled to start the 2023 season, batting .235 with 10 home runs and 34 RBIs in 107 games through August 3. That day, Phillies superfan Jon McCann, also known as "The Philly Captain," posted a video to social media encouraging fans to give Turner a standing ovation the next night instead of booing him. The clip went viral and was covered by local media such as sports talk radio 94-WIP. After the standing ovation from Phillies fans at Citizens Bank Park on August 4, Turner began a ten-game hitting streak. In the 48 games after the ovation, Turner batted .337 with 16 home runs and 42 RBIs. Turner's late-season surge and the story behind Jon McCann's standing ovation suggestion was the focus of the 2024 Netflix short documentary The Turnaround. On August 19, 2023, in a 12–3 win against the Washington Nationals, Turner became the third player in Phillies history to hit two home runs in the same inning.

Turner ended the season with 30 stolen bases without being caught, an achievement that set a new record for most steals without being thrown out throughout a single season, surpassing the previous high of 23 set by Chase Utley, also with the Philadelphia Phillies, in 2009.

In 2024, Turner recorded his third all-star team, starting at shortstop for the National League. He became the first Phillies shortstop to be voted by fans to start the game since Jimmy Rollins in 2002.

On August 18, 2025, Turner recorded his 1,500th career hit when he hit a three-run home run in the third inning. He became the 671st person in Major League Baseball history to reach that milestone, joining 23 other active players, including his teammates Bryce Harper and Nick Castellanos. He finished fifth in NL MVP voting in the 2025 season.

== International career ==
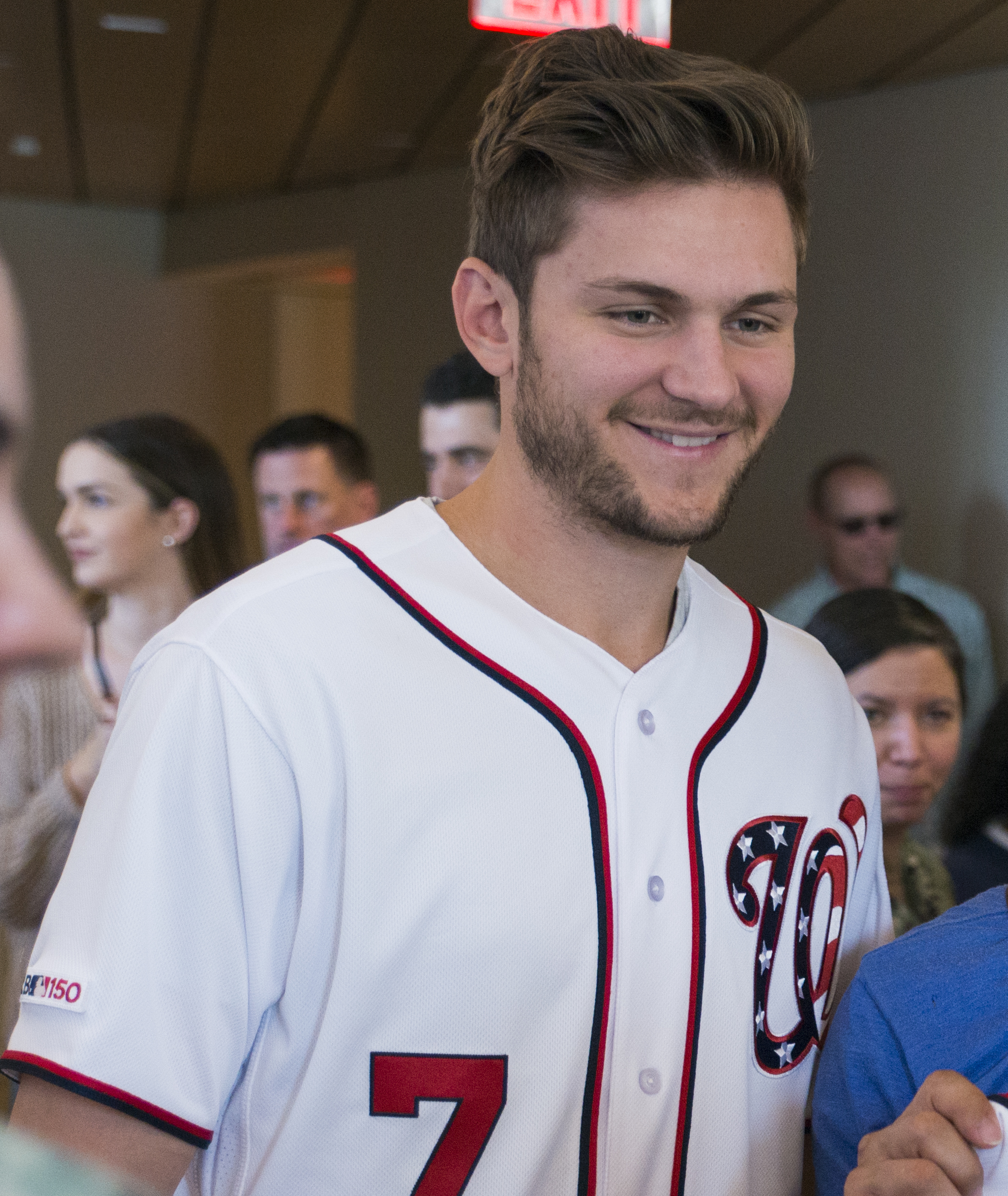
Turner in 2019

On August 31, 2022, Turner announced that he would represent the United States in the 2023 World Baseball Classic. Throughout the tournament, he slashed .391/.440/1.043, leading the US team with a 1.483 OPS and five home runs over 25 plate appearances. During a quarterfinal game against Venezuela, Turner hit a game winning grand slam. He also hit a home run in the championship game, which the United States lost to Japan. Turner's five home runs tied the World Baseball Classic home run record. At the end of the tournament, he was named to the All-Classic Team, one of only two players (along with Randy Arozarena) to be selected unanimously.

== Personal life ==
Turner was born in Boynton Beach, Florida, on June 30, 1993, to parents Mark and Donna. He has an older sister, Teal. He met his future wife, Kristen Harabedian, when they both attended North Carolina State, where Harabedian was a gymnast. Harabedian had also competed in high school gymnastics, and, on January 18, 2010, was featured by Faces in the Crowd in Sports Illustrated. Turner and Harabedian married in November 2018 at St. Joseph's Catholic Church in Washington, D.C. They reside in Palm Beach Gardens, Florida during the offseason. They previously owned a home in Arlington, Virginia, but sold it after Turner was traded to the Dodgers. The Turners have three children.

During the 2018 season, Twitter posts Turner made during college using derogatory language, particularly anti-gay and mentally disabled slurs, became public. Turner became the third player to have offensive tweets from his past discovered in the month of July 2018, following Josh Hader and Sean Newcomb. Turner apologized for the social media postings and stated that his being a teenager at the time was no excuse at a tearful press conference called before the Nationals' next game.

Turner grew up a fan of the Florida Marlins.

== See also ==
- List of Major League Baseball annual triples leaders
- List of Major League Baseball players to hit for the cycle
- List of North Carolina State University people
- Los Angeles Dodgers award winners and league leaders

Achievements
Preceded by Wil Myers; Jake Bauers; Cavan Biggio	Hitting for the cycle April 25, 2017; July 23, 2019; June 30, 2021	Succeeded by Carlos Gómez; Jonathan Villar; Jake Cronenworth
Preceded by Whit Merrifield	Major League Baseball annual hits leader 2020–2021	Succeeded by Most recent
