= Eric Thames =

American baseball player (born 1986)

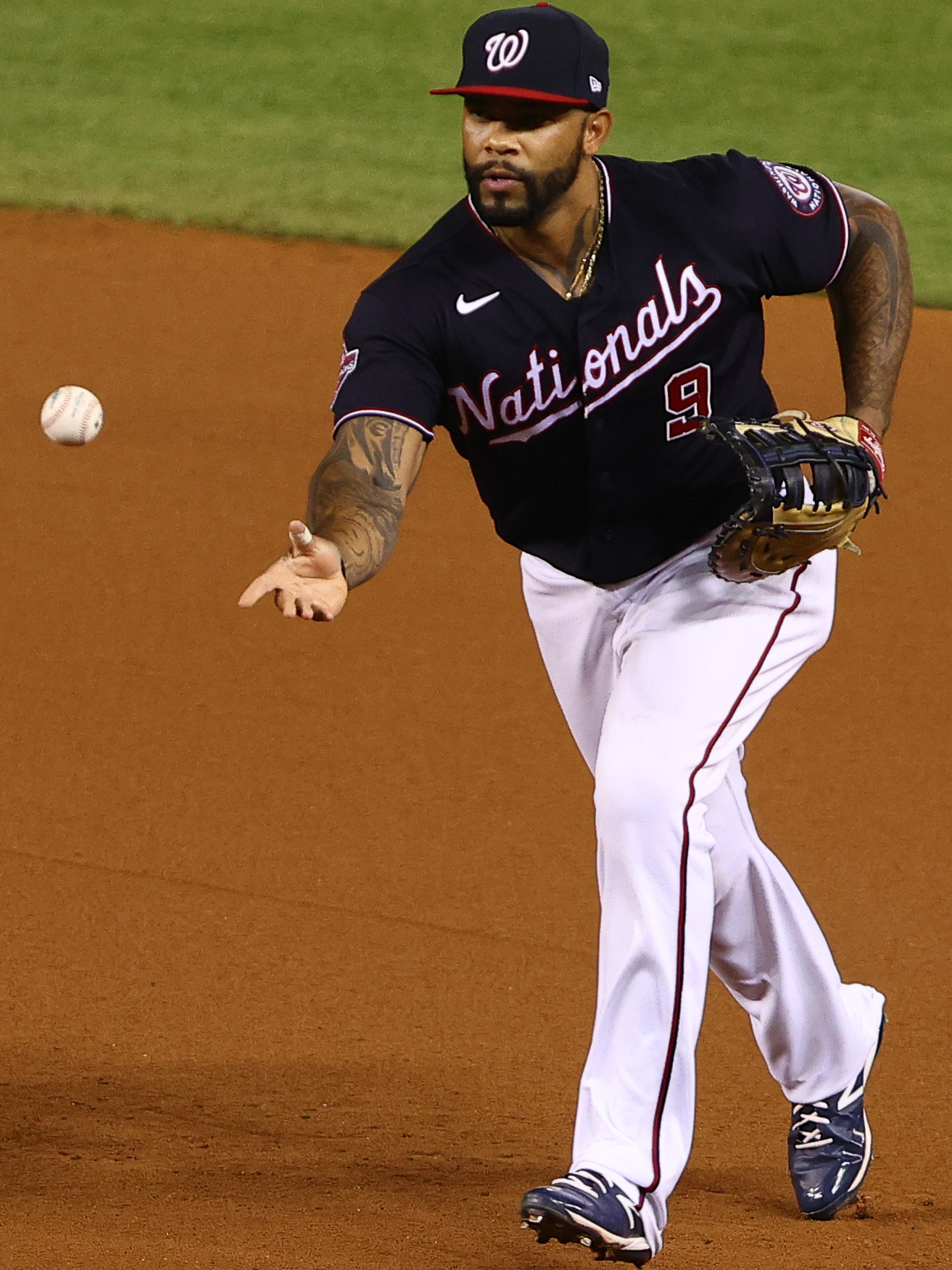
- Thames with the Washington Nationals in 2020
- First baseman / Outfielder
- Born: November 10, 1986 (age 39); Santa Clara, California, U.S.
- Batted: Left Threw: Right

Professional debut
- MLB: May 18, 2011, for the Toronto Blue Jays
- KBO: April 1, 2014, for the NC Dinos
- NPB: April 27, 2021, for the Yomiuri Giants

Last appearance
- KBO: September 29, 2016, for the NC Dinos
- MLB: September 24, 2020, for the Washington Nationals
- NPB: April 27, 2021, for the Yomiuri Giants

MLB statistics
- Batting average: .241
- Home runs: 96
- Runs batted in: 235

KBO statistics
- Batting average: .349
- Home runs: 124
- Runs batted in: 382

NPB statistics
- Batting average: .000
- Home runs: 0
- Runs batted in: 0
- Stats at Baseball Reference

Teams
- Toronto Blue Jays (2011–2012); Seattle Mariners (2012); NC Dinos (2014–2016); Milwaukee Brewers (2017–2019); Washington Nationals (2020); Yomiuri Giants (2021)

Career highlights and awards
- 2× KBO All-Star (2015, 2016); KBO MVP (2015); 2× KBO Golden Glove Award (2015, 2016); KBO batting champion (2015); KBO home run leader (2016)

Eric Allyn Thames (/θeɪmz/ THAYMZ; born November 10, 1986) is an American former professional baseball first baseman and outfielder. He played in Major League Baseball (MLB) for the Toronto Blue Jays, Seattle Mariners, Milwaukee Brewers, and Washington Nationals, in the KBO League for the NC Dinos, and in the Nippon Professional Baseball (NPB) for the Yomiuri Giants.

Thames played college baseball for the Pepperdine Waves, and was chosen by the Blue Jays in the 2008 MLB draft. He made his MLB debut for Toronto in 2011 and was traded to the Mariners in 2012. After spending the 2013 season in Minor League Baseball, he signed with the Dinos for the 2014 season. He won the KBO League Most Valuable Player Award in 2015, and signed with the Brewers before the 2017 season. He signed with the Nationals in 2020, joining Yomiuri after that season.

== Early life and career ==
Thames grew up in the San Jose-Santa Clara area. He attended Bellarmine College Preparatory in San Jose. As a freshman, he was the junior varsity baseball team's third string shortstop. He became the starting shortstop as a sophomore, and then joined the varsity team in his junior year. He was an All-League player for two years and a team MVP as a senior in 2004.

Thames then attended West Valley Community College after sitting a year at Cabrillo College in 2005. During the 2006 season Thames made the Northern California all-state team, and he also made the first team all conference squad. From there, Thames transferred to Pepperdine University to play for the Pepperdine Waves. In 2007, he played summer league baseball for the La Crosse Loggers of the Northwoods League.

The New York Yankees of Major League Baseball selected Thames in the 39th round of the 2007 MLB draft, with the 1,191st overall selection. He returned to Pepperdine for the 2008 season. In 2008, Thames batted .407 with 13 home runs for the Waves, and was named the West Coast Conference's most valuable player. Towards the end of the season, he tore a quadriceps muscle during a game.

== Professional career ==
=== Toronto Blue Jays ===
Due to his quadriceps injury, Thames fell in the 2008 MLB draft. Initially projected to be selected in the first three rounds, the Toronto Blue Jays selected him in the seventh round, with the 219th overall selection. Thames signed with the Blue Jays and had surgery to repair the torn muscle. He began his professional career with the Dunedin Blue Jays of the Class A-Advanced Florida State League in 2009, where he hit .313 with three home runs and 38 runs batted in (RBIs) in 52 games. His playing time was limited by recurring difficulty with the quadriceps injury, and he also played rehab games for the Gulf Coast League Blue Jays of the Rookie-level Gulf Coast League later that year. Thames spent the 2010 season with the New Hampshire Fisher Cats of the Double-A Eastern League. He hit 27 home runs for the Fisher Cats with 104 RBIs. He began the 2011 season with the Las Vegas 51s of the Triple-A Pacific Coast League (PCL). In 32 games for Las Vegas, Thames batted .342 with six home runs and 30 RBIs.

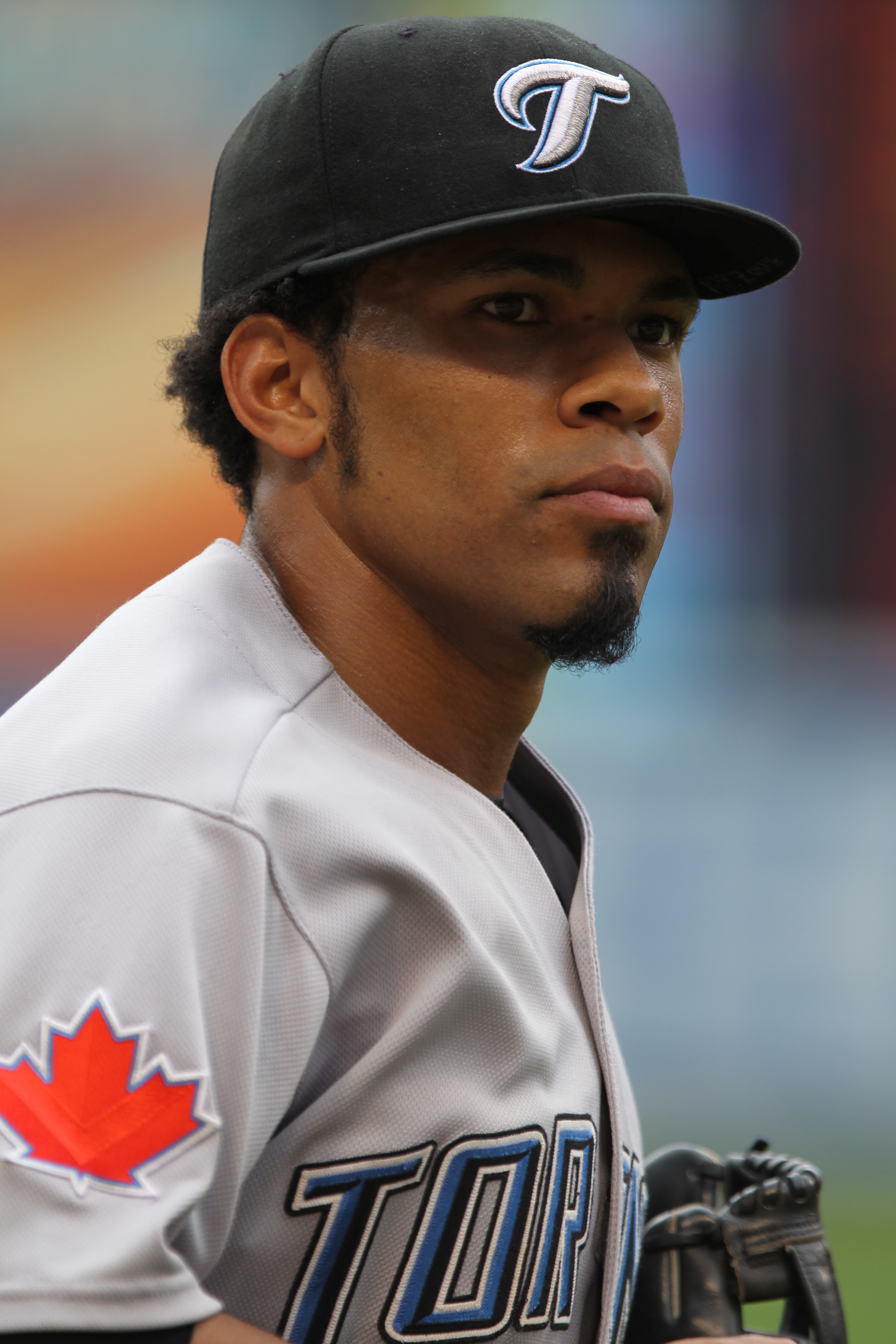
Thames with the Toronto Blue Jays in 2011

Thames made his MLB debut on May 18, 2011, against the Tampa Bay Rays, recording his first career hit and RBI, driving in second baseman Aaron Hill. Thames also recorded his first career walk and run scored in that game. Thames hit his first career double against the Houston Astros on May 21. On June 3, Thames was optioned to Las Vegas to make room for the return of Adam Lind. On June 23, he was recalled to Toronto. On June 29, Thames hit his first career home run off Pittsburgh Pirates starter Paul Maholm. Thames played 95 games for the Blue Jays in 2011, finishing with a .262 batting average, 12 home runs, and 37 RBIs.

The Blue Jays had Thames and Travis Snider compete for a role on their roster in spring training in 2012. Thames made the Blue Jays Opening Day roster and appeared in 46 games for the Blue Jays, in which he hit .243 with three home runs and 11 RBIs. The Blue Jays sent Thames to Las Vegas in late May. He batted .330 for Las Vegas after the demotion.

=== Seattle Mariners ===
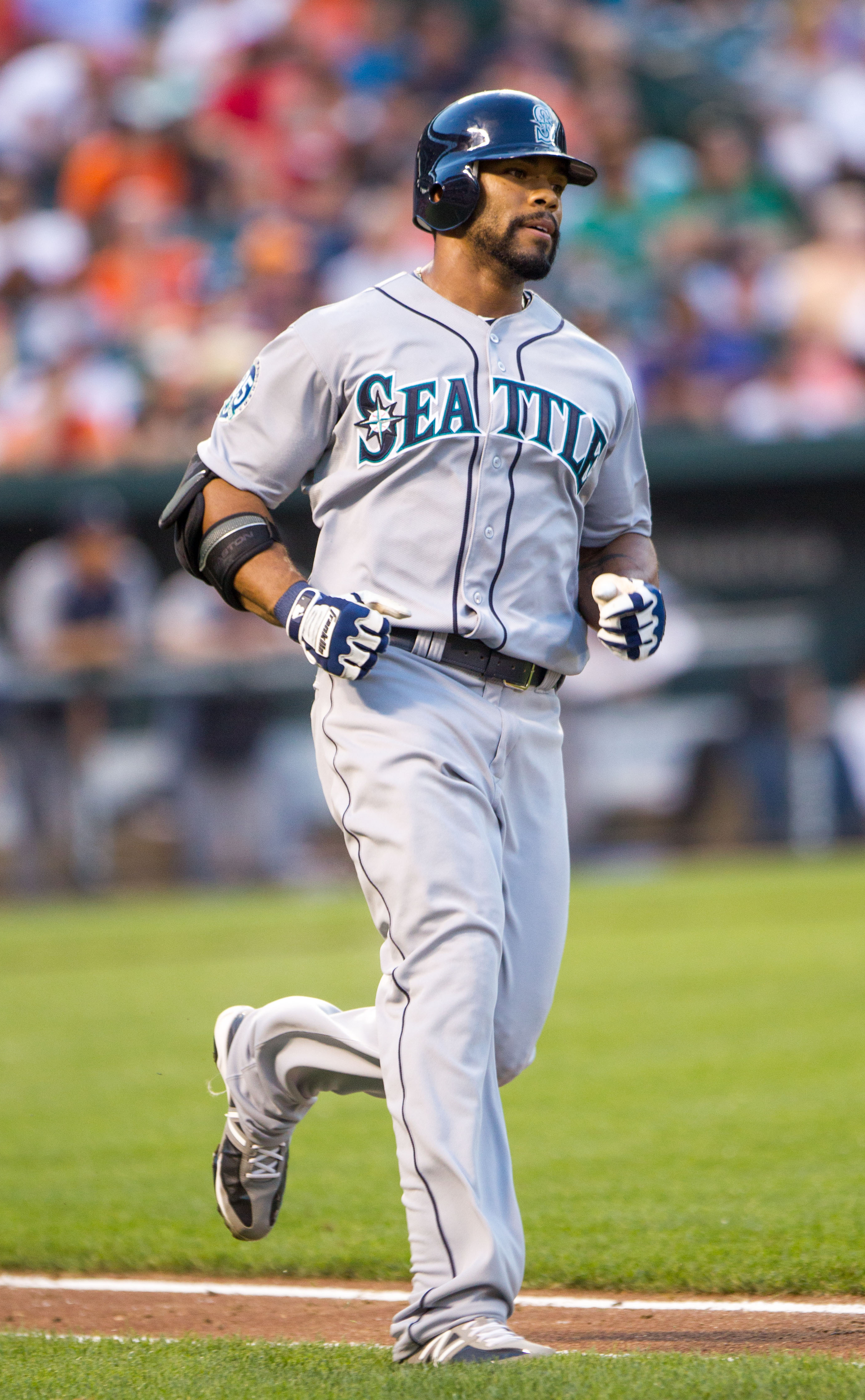
Thames with the Seattle Mariners in 2012

On July 31, 2012, the Blue Jays traded Thames to the Seattle Mariners for pitcher Steve Delabar. Thames made a notable running catch for the first out in Félix Hernández's perfect game on August 15. Thames batted .220 in 40 games for the Mariners.

Before the 2013 season, the Mariners signed outfielders Raúl Ibañez and Jason Bay. The team optioned Thames to the Triple-A Tacoma Rainiers during spring training. He batted .295 in 57 games for Tacoma. On June 22, the Mariners designated Thames for assignment to clear room on the 40-man roster for the return of Franklin Gutiérrez from the 60-day disabled list.

=== Baltimore Orioles and Houston Astros ===
The Mariners traded Thames to the Baltimore Orioles for minor league infielder Ty Kelly on June 30, 2013. Thames was immediately optioned to the Norfolk Tides of the Class AAA International League. He batted .252 with three homers and 13 RBIs for the Tides, and was designated for assignment on September 1.

The Houston Astros claimed Thames off waivers on September 5. He played for the Oklahoma City Redhawks of the PCL the next day. He had two hits (including a home run) in four at-bats as Oklahoma City lost and was eliminated from the playoffs.

=== NC Dinos ===
After the 2013 season, Thames played in the Venezuelan Winter League, where he was scouted by the NC Dinos of the KBO League. The Astros released Thames so that he could sign with the Dinos. He signed a one-year contract for $800,000.

In the 2014 season, Thames batted .343 with 37 home runs, 121 RBIs, and an on-base plus slugging of 1.111.

During the 2015 season, Thames became the first player in KBO history to hit for the cycle twice in one season. Thames then signed a two-year contract to remain with the Dinos. He batted .381 with 47 home runs and 40 stolen bases in 2015, becoming the first KBO player to hit 40 home runs and steal 40 bases in a season. On November 24, 2015, Thames won the KBO League Most Valuable Player Award. He became the third foreign-born player to win the award, joining Tyrone Woods and Danny Rios. Also, Thames won the 2015 KBO Golden Glove Award for first basemen. Thames hit .321 in the 2016 season, adding 40 home runs and 121 RBIs.

=== Milwaukee Brewers ===
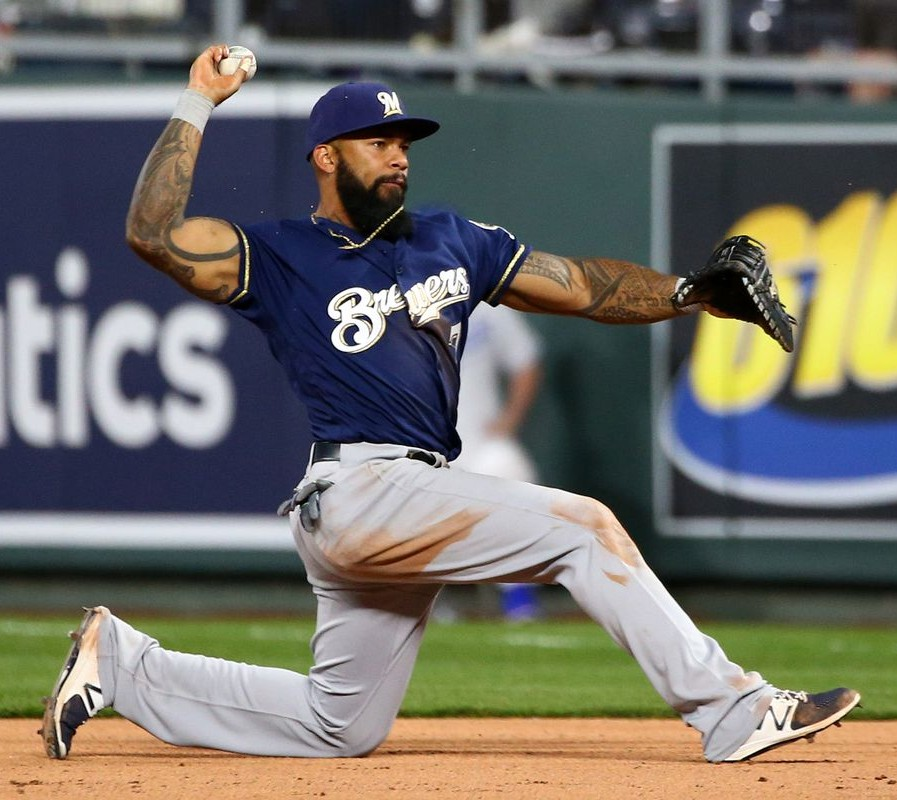
Thames with the Milwaukee Brewers in 2019

On November 29, 2016, Thames signed a three-year, $16 million contract with the Milwaukee Brewers, with a $7.5 million club option for a fourth year.

On April 3, 2017, Thames was the starting first baseman, making his Brewer debut on Opening Day against the Colorado Rockies. He went 1-4, hitting a two-run double in the fifth inning, striking out twice, walking once, and scoring a run. He set the Brewers club record for home runs in the month of April, with his 11th on April 25, in a 9−1 win versus the Cincinnati Reds.

In April 2018, the Brewers won back to back games against the Cincinnati Reds, with both games being decided by a two-run home run by Thames. In his first 22 games, Thames hit seven home runs. On April 25, he wound up on the disabled list due to a torn UCL in the thumb on his left hand. Thames returned to the Brewers' active roster on June 11, but due to the surge of fellow first baseman Jesús Aguilar, Thames was primarily used as an outfielder upon his return.

Thames started 2019 as a bench player for the Brewers. He reclaimed the starting first base job from Aguilar, and batted .247 with 25 home runs in 149 games. In the 2019 National League Wild Card Game, Thames went 2-4 with a 2nd inning solo home run off of Max Scherzer, but the Brewers would lose the game and get eliminated from the 2019 postseason. The Brewers declined his $7.5 million option for the 2020 season, making Thames a free agent.

=== Washington Nationals ===
On January 8, 2020, Thames signed with the Washington Nationals for the 2020 season, agreeing to a one-year deal with a mutual option for the 2021 season.

With Ryan Zimmerman opting out of the 2020 season due to the COVID-19 pandemic, Thames became the team's starting first baseman. Thames struggled in the role, hitting .203 with only three home runs and posting an OPS+ of 65, well below average.

=== Yomiuri Giants ===
On December 30, 2020, Thames signed with the Yomiuri Giants of the Nippon Professional Baseball (NPB). In his debut on April 27, 2021, he left the game in the third inning after suffering a leg injury trying to field a fly ball. He was later diagnosed with a ruptured Achilles tendon. He returned to the U.S. and underwent surgery on May 4. On August 23, the Giants released him.

=== Oakland Athletics ===
On February 18, 2022, Thames signed a minor league deal with the Oakland Athletics. Thames appeared in 22 games for the Triple-A Las Vegas Aviators, slashing .274/.337/.452 with 3 home runs and 16 RBI. On May 10, he was released by Oakland.

On February 15, 2023, Thames announced his retirement from professional baseball.

== Personal life ==
In April 2016, Changwon city awarded honorary citizenship to Thames.

In February 2017, Thames won the James B. Pirtle Memorial Golf Classic tournament in Palm Springs, Florida, beating actor Dylan McDermott in the final round.

In January 2019, Thames appeared on the Korean television show King of Mask Singer, singing Isn't She Lovely and the K-pop song Americano. Many were impressed by his vocal talent.
