= 2021 Washington Nationals season =

2021 Washington Nationals
- League: National League
- Division: East
- Ballpark: Nationals Park
- City: Washington, D.C.
- Record: 65–97 (.401)
- Divisional place: 5th
- Owners: Lerner Enterprises
- General managers: Mike Rizzo
- Managers: Dave Martinez
- Television: MASN (Bob Carpenter, FP Santangelo, Justin Maxwell, Dan Kolko)
- Radio: 106.7 The Fan; Washington Nationals Radio Network (Charlie Slowes, Dave Jageler)

The 2021 Washington Nationals season was the Nationals' 17th season as the baseball franchise of Major League Baseball in the District of Columbia, the 14th season at Nationals Park, and the 53rd since the original team was started in Montreal, Quebec, Canada.

After a disappointing start to the 2021 season, in which the team was under .500 at the July trade deadline, general manager Mike Rizzo disassembled much of the team, trading ace pitcher Max Scherzer and superstar shortstop Trea Turner to the Los Angeles Dodgers, among many other trades of starting players in exchange for prospects, signifying the start of a rebuilding process. The Nationals slumped to a 18–42 (.300) record of wins and losses after the trade deadline, the worst 60-game closing stretch in club history, and finished 65–97, last in the National League East for the first time since the 2010 season. Sixty players appeared for the Nationals over the course of the season, a single-season record for the team. The Nationals also had a 15–62 (.195) record in games in which their opponent scored first, as opposed to a 50–35 (.588) record when scoring first. The Nationals also went 2–11 (.154) in extra innings and went 7–11 (.389) in games that ended in a walk-off for the winning team.

== Offseason ==
=== Team news ===
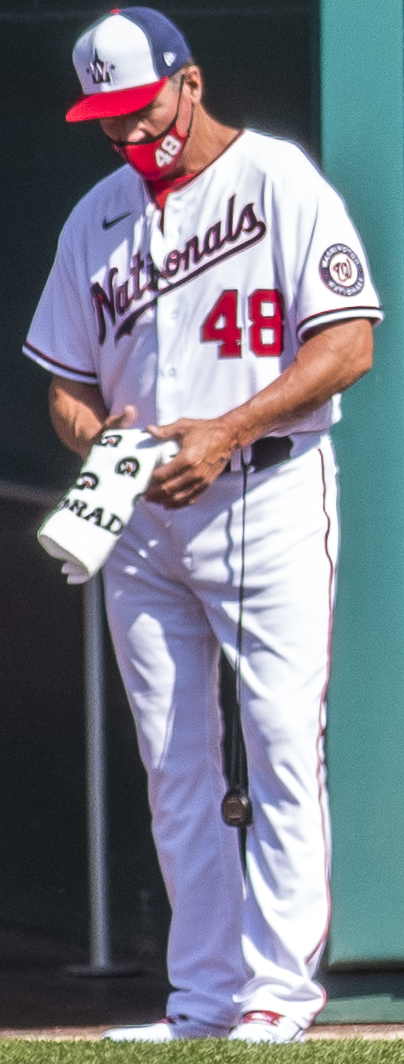
The Nationals named Jim Hickey as their new pitching coach for 2021 after parting ways with Paul Menhart.

With the eleventh overall selection, the Nationals were guaranteed their highest first-round draft pick since 2011 after finishing in a five-way tie for the seventh-worst record in MLB in 2020.

Coming off their first losing season since 2011, the Nationals overhauled their coaching staff. With the contracts of third base coach Chip Hale, hitting coach Kevin Long, and pitching coach Paul Menhart expiring after the 2020 season, the Nationals decided not to renew them, The Washington Post and other media outlets reported. The team announced the hiring of Jim Hickey, who worked with manager Dave Martinez during their time with the Tampa Bay Rays, as pitching coach on October 19, 2020. Despite previous media reports, the Nationals did sign Long to a new deal, also shifting first base coach Bob Henley back to third base and promoting Randy Knorr, manager of the Class-AAA Fresno Grizzlies, to the first base coaching job.

The Nationals also made major changes to their roster, designating 10 players—pitchers Aaron Barrett, James Bourque, Roenis Elías, Paolo Espino, Sam Freeman, Javy Guerra, and Austen Williams, catcher Raudy Read, infielder Adrián Sánchez, and outfielder Michael A. Taylor—off of the major league roster before announcing they would decline 2021 options for outfielder Adam Eaton, starting pitcher Aníbal Sánchez, and first basemen Howie Kendrick and Eric Thames, making them free agents. The Nationals also saw utility infielders Asdrúbal Cabrera and Brock Holt, relief pitcher Sean Doolittle, catcher Kurt Suzuki, and first baseman Ryan Zimmerman depart as unrestricted free agents. The team signed pending free agent infielder/outfielder Josh Harrison to a new one-year deal on October 22, 2020, before he reached free agency, and announced a new one-year deal with Zimmerman on January 23, 2021. Kendrick announced his retirement on December 21, 2020, after fifteen seasons in the major leagues.

Publicly, the Nationals were linked to possible deals for a number of players, including potential trade targets Kris Bryant, infielder/outfielder for the Chicago Cubs, and Eugenio Suárez, third baseman for the Cincinnati Reds; and free agents Álex Colomé, a right-handed reliever formerly with the Chicago White Sox (ultimately signed with the Minnesota Twins); DJ LeMahieu, an infielder formerly with the New York Yankees (ultimately re-signed with the Yankees); Yadier Molina, a catcher formerly with the St. Louis Cardinals (ultimately re-signed with the Cardinals); J. T. Realmuto, a catcher formerly with the Philadelphia Phillies (ultimately re-signed with the Phillies); Carlos Santana, a first baseman formerly with the Cleveland Indians (ultimately signed with the Kansas City Royals); and Justin Turner, a third baseman formerly with the Los Angeles Dodgers (ultimately re-signed with the Dodgers).

On November 18, 2020, the Nationals signed left-handed reliever Sam Clay, a minor league free agent out of the Minnesota Twins organization, to a major league contract. The Nationals also claimed a right-handed pitcher, Rogelio Armenteros, off waivers from the Arizona Diamondbacks on December 7. On December 24, the Nationals traded two pitching prospects, Wil Crowe and Eddy Yean, to the Pittsburgh Pirates in exchange for first baseman Josh Bell. The Nationals further bolstered their lineup on January 9, 2021, by signing outfielder Kyle Schwarber to a one-year major league deal with a mutual option for the 2022 season, after Schwarber was non-tendered by the Cubs earlier in the offseason. On January 26, 2021, the Nationals announced a one-year pact with closer Brad Hand; the following day, they announced starter Jon Lester was joining the team on a one-year contract as well. Catcher Alex Avila was signed to another one-year deal announced February 3.

Washington avoided arbitration with starting pitcher Joe Ross, signing him to a $1.5 million contract for the 2021 season on December 1, 2020. The Nationals also reached one-year deals with their three other arbitration-eligible players, first baseman Josh Bell, outfielder Juan Soto, and shortstop Trea Turner, on the January 15, 2021, deadline to exchange salary figures.

With a reorganization underway of Minor League Baseball, the Nationals announced a new 10-year player development contract with the Rochester Red Wings in Rochester, New York, formerly Minnesota's Class-AAA affiliate, on November 19. The Nationals did not renew their two-year deal with Class-AAA Fresno and also discontinued their 14-year affiliation with the Class-A Hagerstown Suns in Hagerstown, Maryland, and their 10-year affiliation with the Class-A Short Season Auburn Doubledays in Auburn, New York, with short-season classification play being discontinued. The Wilmington Blue Rocks in Wilmington, Delaware, were named as the Nationals' new Class-A Advanced affiliate on December 9, 2020. The Fredericksburg Nationals will remain a Washington affiliate, shifting to the lower Class-A classification to take the Suns' place, while the Harrisburg Senators were invited to keep their Class-AA affiliation with the Nationals as well.

=== Transactions ===
- October 9, 2020: The Nationals outrighted right-handed pitchers Aaron Barrett, Paolo Espino, and Austen Williams and infielder Adrián Sánchez to the minor leagues; Barrett and Espino elected free agency.
- October 10, 2020: The Nationals outrighted left-handed pitcher Roenis Elías to the minor leagues; he elected free agency.
- October 12, 2020: The Nationals outrighted left-handed pitcher Sam Freeman and right-handed pitcher Javy Guerra to the minor leagues; they elected free agency.
- October 13, 2020: The Nationals outrighted right-handed pitcher James Bourque and catcher Raudy Read to the minor leagues.
- October 15, 2020: The Nationals outrighted outfielder Michael A. Taylor to the minor leagues; he elected free agency.
- October 19, 2020: The Nationals hired pitching coach Jim Hickey.
- October 22, 2020: The Nationals signed infielder/outfielder Josh Harrison to a one-year contract extension.
- October 23, 2020: The Nationals selected the contract of right-handed pitcher Steven Fuentes from the minor leagues.
- November 18, 2020: The Nationals signed left-handed pitcher Sam Clay to a major league contract.
- November 20, 2020: The Nationals selected the contracts of right-handed pitcher Joan Adon and infielder Yasel Antuna from the minor leagues.
- December 1, 2020: The Nationals re-signed right-handed pitcher Joe Ross to a one-year major league contract.
- December 7, 2020: The Nationals claimed right-handed pitcher Rogelio Armenteros off waivers from the Arizona Diamondbacks.
- December 24, 2020: The Nationals acquired first baseman Josh Bell from the Pittsburgh Pirates for right-handed pitcher Wil Crowe and minor league pitcher Eddy Yean.
- January 9, 2021: The Nationals signed outfielder Kyle Schwarber to a one-year major league contract.
- January 15, 2021: The Nationals re-signed first baseman Josh Bell, outfielder Juan Soto, and shortstop Trea Turner to one-year major league contracts.
- January 23, 2021: The Nationals signed first baseman Ryan Zimmerman to a one-year major league contract.
- January 26, 2021: The Nationals signed left-handed pitcher Brad Hand to a one-year major league contract.
- January 27, 2021: The Nationals signed left-handed pitcher Jon Lester to a one-year major league contract.
- February 3, 2021: The Nationals signed catcher Alex Avila to a one-year major league contract.
- March 27, 2021: The Nationals selected the contracts of infielders Hernán Pérez and Jordy Mercer from the minor leagues and designated infielder Jake Noll for assignment.
- March 28, 2021: The Nationals selected the contract of left-handed pitcher Luis Avilán and designated right-handed pitcher Dakota Bacus for assignment.
- April 3, 2021: The Nationals signed catcher Jonathan Lucroy to a minor league contract.
- April 6, 2021: The Nationals selected the contract of catcher Jonathan Lucroy from the minor leagues and added outfielder Cody Wilson to the active roster as a replacement player.

=== Spring training ===
The Nationals held spring training at their facility at FITTEAM Ballpark of the Palm Beaches in West Palm Beach, Florida, which they share with the Houston Astros. It was their fifth year at the facility.

On the first day of camp, the Nationals announced they had invited 31 players on minor league contracts to major league spring training, including top pitching prospects Jackson Rutledge and Cade Cavalli. Other invitees included: pitchers Luis Avilán, Aaron Barrett, Bryan Bonnell, Tim Cate, Jacob Condra-Bogan, Matt Cronin, Tyler Dyson, Tyler Eppler, Paolo Espino, Javy Guerra, Cole Henry, Gabe Klobosits, T. J. McFarland, Todd Peterson, and Jefry Rodriguez; catchers Welington Castillo, Israel Pineda, Raudy Read, Jakson Reetz, and Blake Swihart; infielders Jackson Cluff, Drew Mendoza, Jordy Mercer, Hernán Pérez, Adrián Sanchez, and Brandon Snyder; and outfielders Gerardo Parra, Carlos Tocci, Yasmany Tomás, and Cody Wilson.

On February 22, five days after pitchers and catchers first reported to West Palm Beach, the Nationals signed another pitcher, Jeremy Jeffress, to a minor league deal with a spring training invitation. However, the Nationals released Jeffress over an unspecified "personnel matter" before he pitched in a game, on March 7.

Reliever Will Harris was shut down midway through camp after experiencing tingling and numbness in his right pitching hand. A doctor initially diagnosed him with a blood clot in his throwing arm, but a venogram later determined Harris did not have a blood clot or thoracic outlet syndrome. Starting pitcher Jon Lester was also briefly shut down early in camp, undergoing a procedure to remove a parathyroid gland before returning to action. Pitcher Stephen Strasburg, infielder Starlin Castro, and outfielder Juan Soto were also slowed by leg injuries during camp that team doctors determined to be minor.

On March 27, the Nationals made their final major round of roster cuts, designating rookie infielder Jake Noll for assignment and purchasing the contracts of veteran utilitymen Jordy Mercer and Hernán Pérez. Former top prospects Luis García Jr. and Carter Kieboom were optioned to the minor leagues after disappointing spring training performances; Kieboom had been expected to be the starting third baseman for the Nationals, but that changed after he managed just six hits over his first 17 spring training games while striking out 17 times, including an 0-for-5 performance in a win over the New York Mets on March 26. The Nationals made one more addition on March 28, officially naming left-handed reliever Luis Avilán to the 26-man roster and designating right-hander Dakota Bacus for assignment in a corresponding move.

==== Before Opening Day ====
After he was released from a minor league deal with the Chicago White Sox, with whom he spent spring training, catcher Jonathan Lucroy signed a new minor league deal with the Nationals on April 3, days after the Nationals broke camp. Lucroy's contract was selected and he was promoted to the 26-man roster before the Nationals' first game of the season on April 6, as Yan Gomes, Alex Avila, Josh Bell, Kyle Schwarber, Josh Harrison, Jon Lester, Patrick Corbin, Brad Hand, Will Harris, and Jordy Mercer were placed on the injured list. Cody Wilson was also named to the roster as a "replacement player" as the Nationals dealt with a COVID-19 outbreak in the clubhouse. The Nationals also brought up Luis García Jr., Carter Kieboom, Yadiel Hernández, Tres Barrera, Sam Clay, Ryne Harper, and Kyle McGowin after previously optioning them to the minors during spring training.

== Regular season ==
=== Opening Day ===
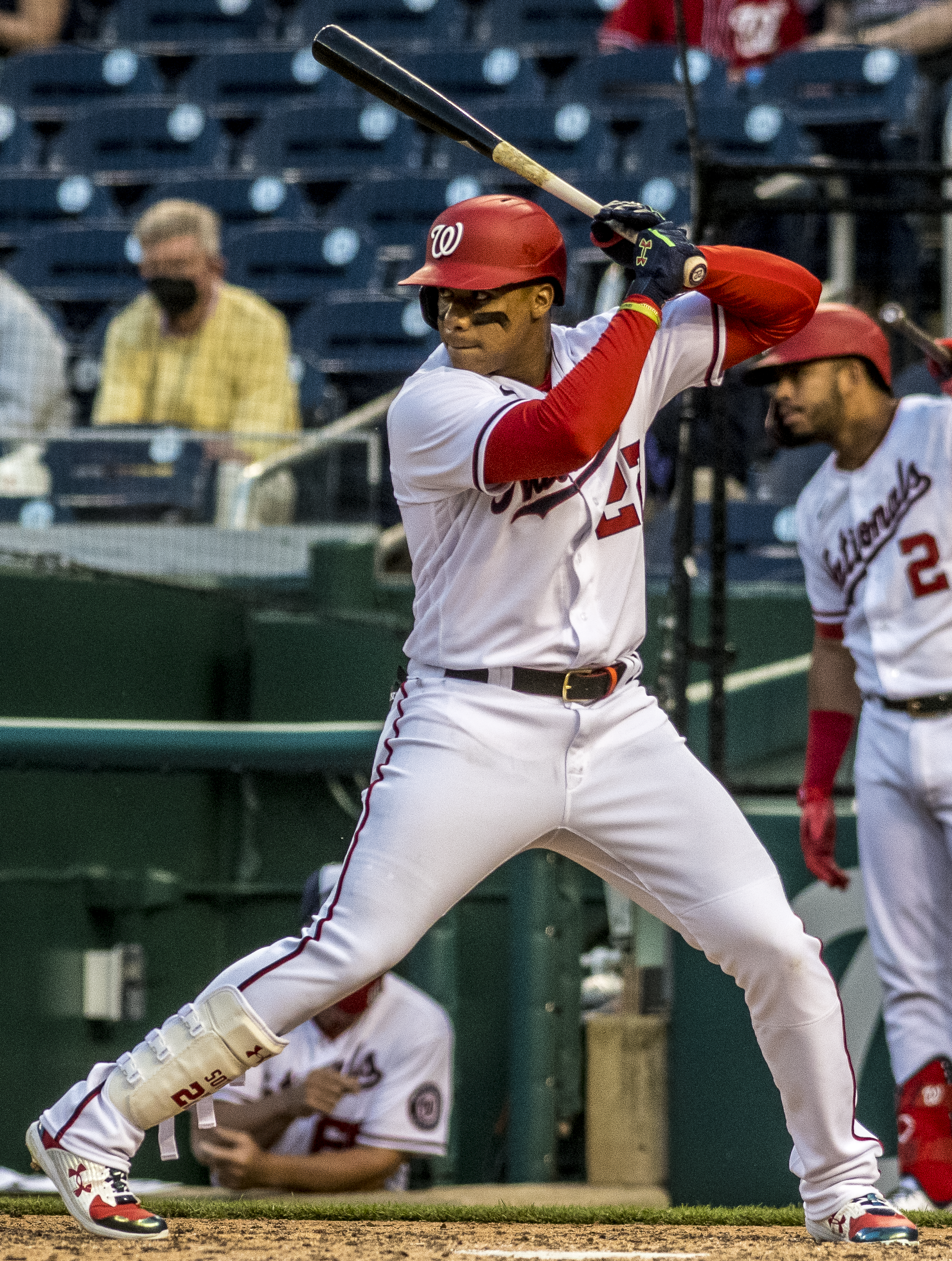
Juan Soto, moments before delivering an RBI single to walk off the Atlanta Braves on April 6, 2021.

The Nationals invited President Joe Biden to throw out the first pitch on Opening Day, which had been scheduled for April 1 at home against the division-rival New York Mets. Biden declined the invitation.

The April 1 game was postponed to a date to be determined after the Nationals suffered a COVID-19 outbreak, with at least four players testing positive and as many as seven others directed to quarantine under MLB's health and safety protocols. With three games against the Mets and one game against the Atlanta Braves postponed due to COVID-19, the Nationals' Opening Day was rescheduled for April 6 at home versus the division-rival Braves.

Before the game, the Nationals and an announced crowd of 4,801 (Note: Because of the COVID-19 pandemic, April 6 was the first time since Game 5 of the 2019 World Series that Nationals Park had hosted fans for a live baseball game. Attendance was limited to no more than 5,000 in the ballpark by order of the District of Columbia government. (See Fendrich, Howard, "Nats finally play, top Braves 6-5 on Soto's walk-off in 9th", The Associated Press, April 6, 2021.)) observed the ceremonial raising of Washington's 2019 World Series champion flag. Opening Day starter Max Scherzer toed the slab and delivered his first pitch to Braves right fielder Ronald Acuña Jr. at 4:06 p.m. EDT, a fastball at the top of the zone that Acuña turned on and drove into the seats above the visitors' bullpen in left field. Two batters later, Scherzer surrendered another home run to Braves first baseman and reigning National League Most Valuable Player Freddie Freeman. After starter Drew Smyly provided Atlanta with a scoreless bottom of the first inning, the Braves scored again on another solo shot off the bat of shortstop Dansby Swanson, giving them an early 3–0 lead.

The Nationals answered in the bottom of the second. With two outs, second baseman Hernán Pérez came up with Washington's first base hit, a line drive single into left field. After left fielder Andrew Stevenson reached on a sharp groundball deflected by Atlanta second baseman Ozzie Albies, which was ruled an error, the newest member of the Nationals organization, catcher Jonathan Lucroy—signed and selected to the roster to replace Alex Avila and Yan Gomes, who were placed on the injured list due to COVID-19 protocols, and tasked with catching Scherzer for the first time in his career on Opening Day—poked an 0–2 pitch up the left field line to score both runners.

The Braves quickly got one of those runs back as Acuña again took Scherzer deep to left-center. But Scherzer rallied, striking out the next two batters and working around a two-out single by Braves left fielder Marcell Ozuna to escape the inning. In the bottom of the third, Scherzer led off with a lineout to Acuña in right field, in his first at-bat in a non-exhibition game since Game 2 of the 2019 National League Championship Series. (Note: The designated hitter rule was in place in the National League for the 2020 Major League Baseball season. (See Walker, Ben, "Opening Day: Snow, stars, fans and a virus postponement", The Associated Press, April 1, 2021.)) But after center fielder Víctor Robles walked with one out, shortstop Trea Turner—a surprise inclusion on the Opening Day roster after he missed a full-team workout the previous day, reportedly while the Nationals were waiting for a negative COVID-19 test result—lined a home run to left field off Smyly, evening the game at 4–4.

Scherzer struck out nine batters over six innings, not allowing a hit the rest of the way before Kyle Finnegan relieved him in the seventh inning. Finnegan gave up consecutive one-out singles, the second on a bunt by rookie center fielder Cristian Pache, before walking pinch-hitter Pablo Sandoval. Next up to bat, Acuña hit a groundball to the second baseman Pérez, but the play developed too slowly for the Nationals infield to turn a double play, only getting an out at first base as veteran first baseman Ryan Zimmerman backhanded Pérez's relay and hugged the ball and his mitt to his chest. Wander Suero took over from Finnegan and summarily retired the side, Albies grounding out to Turner to squash the scoring threat. The Nationals loaded the bases themselves in the bottom of the seventh against Braves reliever Tyler Matzek, on a single by Stevenson and walks by pinch-hitter Carter Kieboom and the leadoff hitter Robles, but Josh Tomlin relieved Matzek and got Turner to fly out to Ozuna in left field to strand the bases loaded.

After a scoreless top of the eighth by reliever Kyle McGowin, the Nationals rallied against A. J. Minter in the bottom of the inning. After right fielder Juan Soto, the defending National League batting champion, led off the inning with a hard lineout to Pache in deep center field, Zimmerman and third baseman Starlin Castro rapped consecutive one-out singles to left field, and Pérez walked to load the bases. Stevenson hit another sharp groundball to an infielder, this one a stinger to the shortstop Swanson that was ruled a base hit, to score Zimmerman from third and tie the game at 5–5. But the Nationals again left the bases loaded as Lucroy grounded into a fielder's choice at home plate and pinch-hitter Yadiel Hernández lined out to Ozuna in left to end the inning.

The Braves briefly thought they had gone back on top when Pache hit a deep flyball past the left field foul pole off Nationals closer Daniel Hudson with one out in the top of the ninth inning. But the umpires convened and ruled it a foul ball, instead of Pache's first career home run. The ruling was upheld on a review requested by Braves manager Brian Snitker, and Hudson struck Pache out on the next pitch. After pinch-hitter Johan Camargo worked a two-out walk, Acuña grounded out to keep the game scoreless headed to the bottom of the ninth. Snitker turned to reliever Will Smith to try to force the game to extra innings, but Smith failed to record an out. Robles lined a single that fell in front of Acuña in right field to lead off the bottom of the ninth, then Smith overthrew a slider that hit Turner in the calf, sending him to first base. Soto, who had gone 0-for-4 to that point, took three straight balls before lining a 3–0 fastball into center field, driving in Robles for a 6–5 walk-off win. The exit velocity on Soto's RBI single was recorded as 115.3 miles per hour (185.6 km/h), the hardest-hit ball of his career to date.

==== Opening Day lineup ====
Opening Day Starters
Name	Position
Víctor Robles	Center fielder
Trea Turner	Shortstop
Juan Soto	Right fielder
Ryan Zimmerman	First baseman
Starlin Castro	Third baseman
Hernán Pérez	Second baseman
Andrew Stevenson	Left fielder
Jonathan Lucroy	Catcher
Max Scherzer	Pitcher

=== Season standings ===
==== National League East ====
NL East
Team	W	L	Pct.	GB	Home	Road
Atlanta Braves	88	73	.547	—	42‍–‍38	46‍–‍35
Philadelphia Phillies	82	80	.506	6½	47‍–‍34	35‍–‍46
New York Mets	77	85	.475	11½	47‍–‍34	30‍–‍51
Miami Marlins	67	95	.414	21½	42‍–‍39	25‍–‍56
Washington Nationals	65	97	.401	23½	35‍–‍46	30‍–‍51

==== National League Wild Card ====
Division leaders
Team	W	L	Pct.
San Francisco Giants	107	55	.660
Milwaukee Brewers	95	67	.586
Atlanta Braves	88	73	.547

Wild Card teams (Top 2 teams qualify for postseason)
Team	W	L	Pct.	GB
Los Angeles Dodgers	106	56	.654	+16
St. Louis Cardinals	90	72	.556	—
Cincinnati Reds	83	79	.512	7
Philadelphia Phillies	82	80	.506	8
San Diego Padres	79	83	.488	11
New York Mets	77	85	.475	13
Colorado Rockies	74	87	.460	15½
Chicago Cubs	71	91	.438	19
Miami Marlins	67	95	.414	23
Washington Nationals	65	97	.401	25
Pittsburgh Pirates	61	101	.377	29
Arizona Diamondbacks	52	110	.321	38

=== Record vs. opponents ===
2021 National League record Source: MLB Standings Grid – 2021
Team	AZ	ATL	CHC	CIN	COL	LAD	MIA	MIL	NYM	PHI	PIT	SD	SF	STL	WSH	AL
Arizona	—	3–4	2–4	5–1	9–10	3–16	2–5	1–6	1–5	4–3	4–2	8–11	2–17	1–6	3–4	4–16
Atlanta	4–3	—	5–2	4–3	2–4	2–4	11–8	3–3	10–9	10–9	4–3	4–2	3–3	6–1	14–5	6–14
Chicago	4–2	2–5	—	8–11	3–3	4–3	1–5	4–15	4–3	2–5	14–5	5–1	1–6	9–10	4–3	6–14
Cincinnati	1–5	3–4	11–8	—	5–2	3–3	5–2	9–10	3–3	4–2	13–6	1–6	1–6	10–9	5–2	9–11
Colorado	10–9	4–2	3–3	2–5	—	6–13	4–2	2–5	2–5	5–2	4–2	11–8	4–15	3–4	4–2	10–10
Los Angeles	16–3	4–2	3–4	3–3	13–6	—	3–4	4–3	6–1	4–2	6–0	12–7	9–10	4–3	7–0	12–8
Miami	5–2	8–11	5–1	2–5	2–4	4–3	—	3–3	9–10	10–9	2–5	3–4	3–4	0–6	8–11	3–17
Milwaukee	6–1	3–3	15–4	10–9	5–2	3–4	3–3	—	4–2	2–5	14–5	5–2	4–3	8–11	5–1	8–12
New York	5–1	9–10	3–4	3–3	5–2	1–6	10–9	2–4	—	9–10	3–4	4–3	1–5	2–5	11–8	9–11
Philadelphia	3–4	9–10	5–2	2–4	2–5	2–4	9–10	5–2	10–9	—	4–3	4–2	2–4	4–3	13–6	8–12
Pittsburgh	2–4	3–4	5–14	6–13	2–4	0–6	5–2	5–14	4–3	3–4	—	3–4	4–3	7–12	2–4	10–10
San Diego	11–8	2–4	1–5	6–1	8–11	7–12	4–3	2–5	3–4	2–4	4–3	—	8–11	3–3	4–3	14–6
San Francisco	17–2	3–3	6–1	6–1	15–4	10–9	4–3	3–4	5–1	4–2	3–4	11–8	—	2–4	5–2	13–7
St. Louis	6–1	1–6	10–9	9–10	4–3	3–4	6–0	11–8	5–2	3–4	12–7	3–3	4–2	—	2–4	11–9
Washington	4–3	5–14	3–4	2–5	2–4	0–7	11–8	1–5	8–11	6–13	4–2	3–4	2–5	4–2	—	10–10

=== April ===
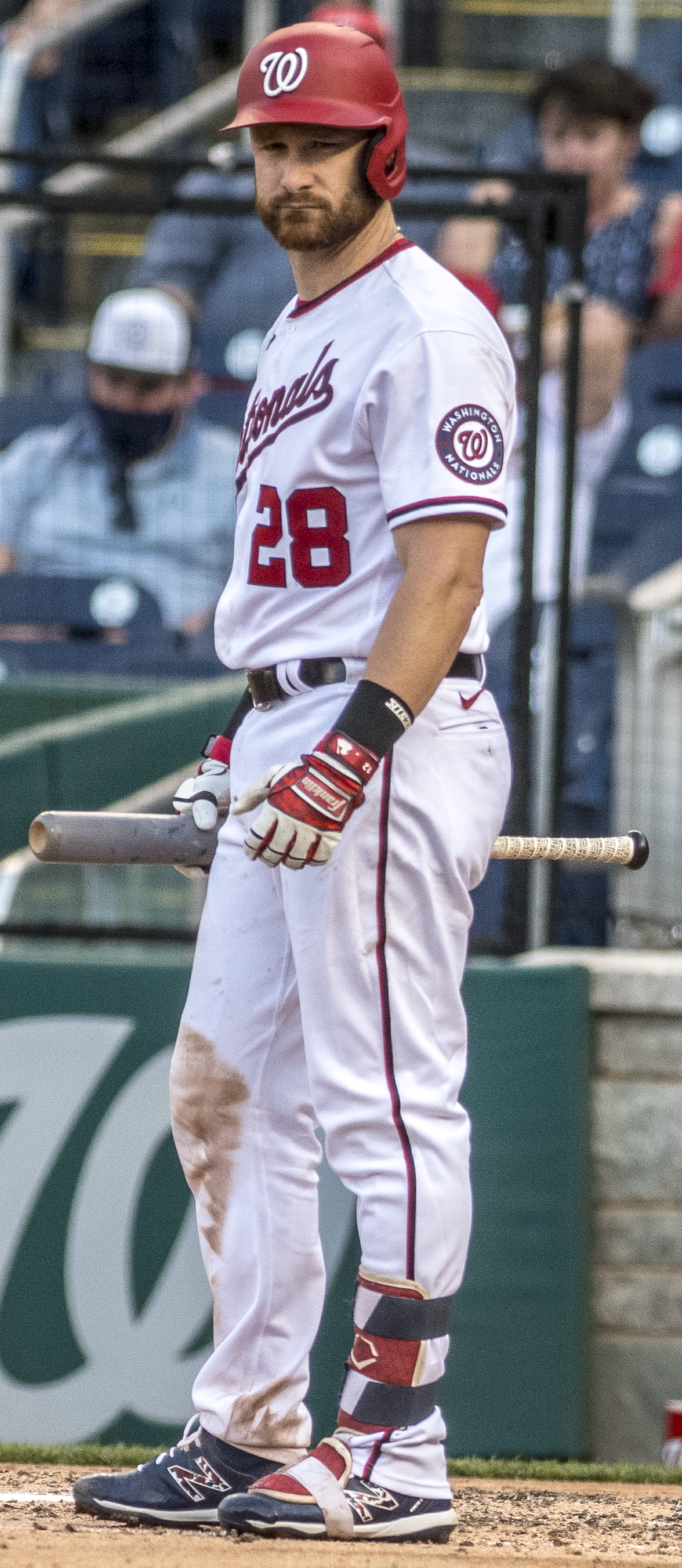
Jonathan Lucroy appeared in five games with the Nationals in April while the team dealt with a COVID-19 outbreak.

After winning on a Juan Soto walk-off single on Opening Day on April 6, the Nationals played a doubleheader April 7 against the Atlanta Braves, making up the postponed April 5 game. While both games were close, the Braves swept the Nationals, getting to starter Erick Fedde in the matinee before tacking on the eventual winning run on a wild pitch by reliever Wander Suero in the seventh inning and shutting out the Nationals in the evening game. The second of the two games was a pitchers' duel between Nationals co-ace Stephen Strasburg and 22-year-old starter Huascar Ynoa, with neither team scoring until the seventh, when Atlanta pinch-hitter Pablo Sandoval slammed a two-run home run to center off reliever Tanner Rainey to give the Braves their margin of victory. Replacement player Cody Wilson and left-handed reliever Sam Clay made their major league debuts in the matinee game, with Clay striking out Braves sluggers Freddie Freeman and Marcell Ozuna in his scoreless inning of work.

Wilson was returned to the Nationals' alternate training site on April 9, as infielder Jordy Mercer, catchers Alex Avila and Yan Gomes, and reliever Brad Hand were activated from the injured list. The Nationals also optioned infielder Carter Kieboom to the alternate training site in Fredericksburg, Virginia, and reassigned catcher Tres Barrera and reliever Ryne Harper to the "taxi squad" of available players for a series on the road against the defending world champion Los Angeles Dodgers. The Nationals were swept by the Dodgers over three games, despite strong starts from Joe Ross on April 9 and Max Scherzer on April 11. In both of those games, the Nationals were shut out. In the April 10 game, a two-homer day for Soto was spoiled by a 4 1/3-inning stinker for returning starter Patrick Corbin, who was activated as reliever Kyle McGowin was optioned that day but gave up six earned runs in his 2021 season debut.

The Nationals activated first baseman Josh Bell, outfielder Kyle Schwarber, and infielder Josh Harrison off the injured list on April 12 ahead of a three-game series against the St. Louis Cardinals. Outfielder Yadiel Hernández and infielder Luis García Jr. were optioned, and catcher Jonathan Lucroy was designated for assignment after appearing in just five games with the Nationals. The Nationals snapped their five-game losing streak behind a resurgent start from Fedde at Busch Stadium on April 12. While Fedde didn't qualify for the win, exiting in the fifth inning, the Nationals got to St. Louis starter John Gant for three runs and tacked on two more against the Cardinals' bullpen to win 5–2, reliever Kyle Finnegan being credited with the win. The Cardinals struck back against Strasburg and veteran Nationals left-handed reliever Luis Avilán on April 13, as Strasburg and Avilán combined to give up 14 runs over the first five innings of the game. Strasburg exhibited reduced velocity and struggled to command his arsenal throughout the game, giving up three home runs. The Nationals turned over the ball to a position player, utilityman Hernán Pérez, in the eighth inning; he struck out two as he retired the side in order. The Nationals lost 14–3. The Nationals shut out the Cardinals in the rubber game, an April 14 matinee, for their first series win of the season. Riding another strong, six-inning outing by Ross, who also singled and scored a run in the contest, the Nationals won 6–0.

Returning home for a four-game series against the Arizona Diamondbacks, the Nationals sent out Corbin for his second start of the season on April 15. It went even more poorly than his first start, as he gave up 10 runs over just two innings to his former team to take the loss. (Note: By runs allowed, Corbin's start was the worst by a Nationals starter in more than three years. The last Nationals starter to allow 10 runs in a game was A. J. Cole against the Atlanta Braves on April 3, 2018. (See Camerato, Jessica, "Corbin still shaky; 'Not like him to hit batters'", MLB.com, April 15, 2021)) Adding injury to insult, Avilán, who appeared in long relief behind Corbin in the defeat, was diagnosed with a torn ulnar collateral ligament of the elbow in his left throwing arm after the game; he went to the injured list and elected to undergo Tommy John surgery. The Nationals rebounded from the April 15 loss to win their next two games, the first time in the season that Washington had strung together back-to-back wins. On April 16, Scherzer provided seven scoreless innings, followed by scoreless innings for Hudson and Hand. Schwarber broke the scoreless tie with a solo home run that traveled 463 feet (141 m) to right field, the deepest walk-off home run ever hit at Nationals Park, in the bottom of the ninth inning to win the game. Fedde turned in another strong start to lead the Nationals to a 6–2 victory on April 17, backed by a strong offensive performance from his batterymate Gomes. Strasburg was scheduled to start the fourth game of the series, but he was placed on the injured list with right shoulder inflammation before the game, along with Suero, who strained his oblique while pitching in the previous game. Having already recalled McGowin to replace Avilán on the roster earlier in the series, the Nationals summoned right-handers Paolo Espino and Ryne Harper to fill in, with Espino shouldering the loss in a spot start just hours after the Nationals selected his contract.

The Nationals' rotation woes continued as Ross, who hadn't allowed a run in his first two starts, was bombed for 10 earned runs in a rematch with the Cardinals at Nationals Park on April 19. Ross took the loss as the Nationals were unable to mount a comeback. After pitching two perfect innings in relief, Harper was optioned to the alternate training site on April 20, and right-handed pitcher Steven Fuentes was recalled to the major leagues for the first time to give the Nationals a fresh arm in the bullpen. The Nationals also called up Hernández to rejoin the team after placing Soto, who struggled at the plate in the series against Arizona, on the injured list with a left shoulder strain. Corbin rebounded in the April 20 game with his first quality start of the season, pitching six scoreless innings. Although Rainey blew the save as St. Louis took a one-run lead in the seventh inning, the Nationals won 3–2 on a game-tying single by shortstop Trea Turner and a go-ahead bases-loaded walk by the catcher Gomes versus Cardinals reliever Giovanny Gallegos. Hudson picked up the win and Hand locked down the save. In the rubber game of the series on April 21, the Nationals won their second consecutive 1–0 game started by Scherzer, with the catcher Avila doubling home Bell for the game's only run in the second inning. St. Louis starter Carlos Martínez took the loss despite pitching six otherwise strong innings.

Heading back out on the road, the Nationals opened a series against the division-rival New York Mets on April 23 by facing their originally scheduled Opening Day opponent, two-time Cy Young Award-winner Jacob deGrom. Sporting a fastball up to 101 miles per hour (163 km/h) and secondary pitches that rarely dipped below 90 miles per hour (140 km/h), deGrom blitzed through a complete-game shutout, giving up just two hits while recording a new career high in strikeouts with 15. Opposing deGrom on the mound, Fedde matched deGrom through four innings before deGrom himself drove in the game's first run with an RBI double in the fifth inning. Fedde gave up two more runs before relievers Austin Voth and Kyle McGowin surrendered three more, and the Nationals lost 6–0. Ross rebounded with a capable outing on April 24 to knot the series at one win apiece, giving up one run over six innings while driving in a run himself as he earned the win. For the second time in the series and the fifth time in the young season, the Nationals were shut out in the rubber game, unable to score off Taijuan Walker or the Mets bullpen. Corbin again struggled to his third loss of the season, allowing all four of the Mets' runs before he was lifted with no outs in the fifth inning. Turner exited the game after being hit by a Walker fastball near the elbow.

Traveling to Dunedin, Florida, for their first interleague game of the season against the Toronto Blue Jays, (Note: The Blue Jays started their 2021 season at their spring training home in Dunedin due to travel restrictions related to the COVID-19 pandemic. (See "Blue Jays to play third homestand in Dunedin", MLB.com, March 30, 2021)) the Nationals split a pair in the two-game set. Former National Tommy Milone, pitching in relief for the Blue Jays, was credited with the win in the first game on April 27, as Scherzer squandered an early three-run lead by giving up a go-ahead grand slam to Vladimir Guerrero Jr. and the Jays never looked back. Guerrero set a new career high with three home runs in the game, the first two off Scherzer and the third off Finnegan, driving in seven of Toronto's nine runs in the contest. Returning to the lineup two days after being hit by a pitch, Turner also had a multi-homer game, going deep in his first two plate appearances. The Nationals salvaged a series split on April 28 as they pounded Toronto starter Steven Matz for six runs in an 8–2 win, three of those runs driven in on a home run by their second baseman Harrison.

The Nationals returned home to begin a three-game series against the division-rival Miami Marlins, which they opened with a win on April 30. Jon Lester made his first start of the season, coming off the injured list to replace Fuentes, who had not appeared in a game in more than a week on the roster. Lester pitched five scoreless innings, but Miami starter Pablo López kept Washington off the board as well. The game went into extra innings, the first time the Nationals had been forced to play past the ninth inning in 2021, under a temporary rule placing a runner on second base to start each half-inning beginning with the tenth. The Marlins drove in their free baserunner for the first run of the game, but the Nationals immediately answered back with a game-winning blast off the bat of Schwarber leading off the bottom of the tenth, driving in their own unearned runner and topping Miami 2–1.

Overall, the Nationals had a losing record in April, going 10–12 to begin the season. Their record was good for third place in the National League East Division and left them one game back of the division-leading Philadelphia Phillies.

=== May ===
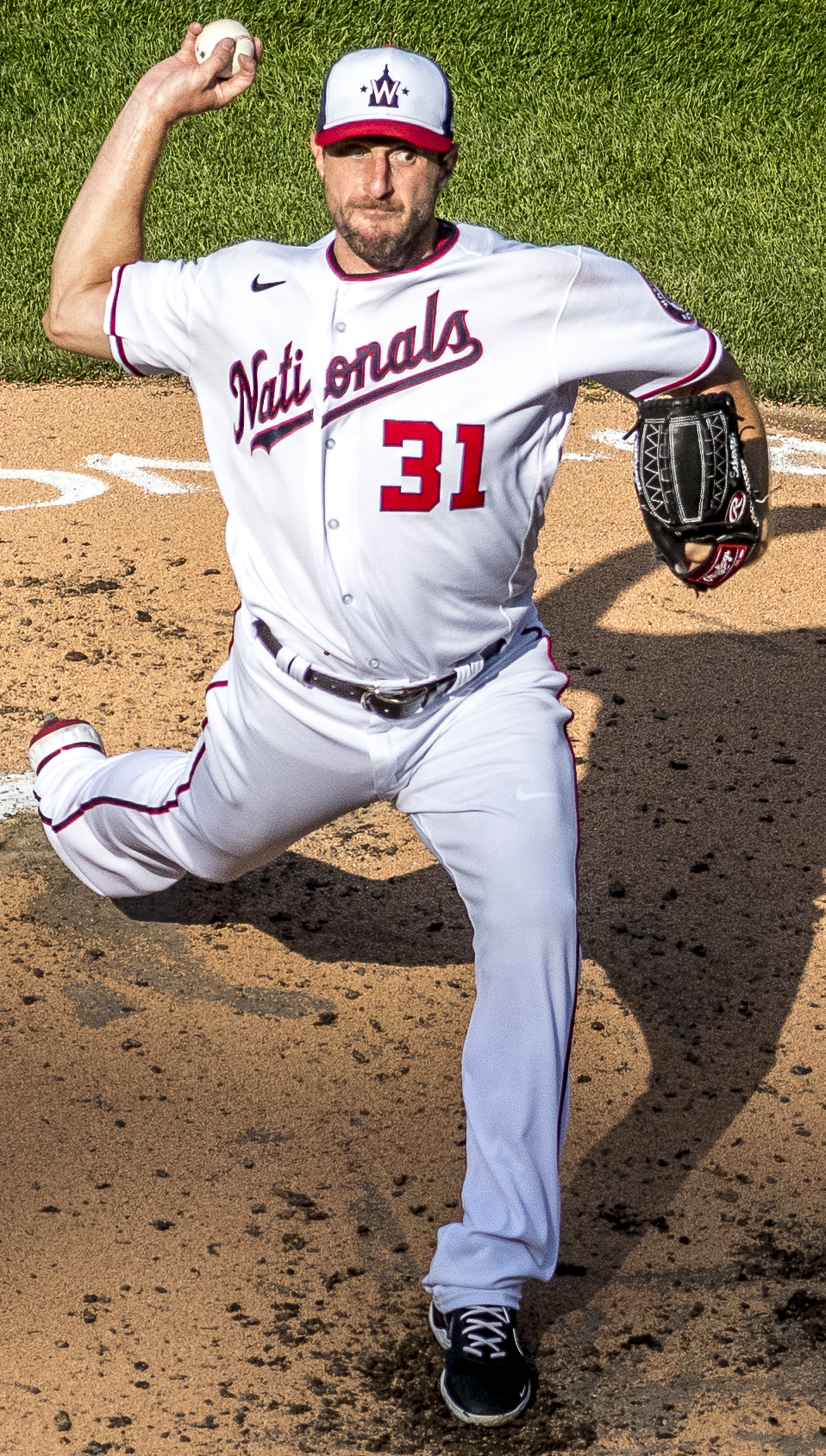
Max Scherzer and wife Erica welcomed their third child in May.

For the first time in 2021, on May 1, the Nationals won a third consecutive game, topping the division-rival Miami Marlins behind a strong seven innings from Patrick Corbin and big offensive performances from catcher Yan Gomes, who hit a two-run home run, and first baseman Josh Bell, who drove in four including via a bases-clearing double. On May 2, Max Scherzer and the Nationals won 3–1 to complete their first series sweep of 2021 and extend their winning streak to four games. First baseman Ryan Zimmerman supplied all of Washington's offense with a three-run home run off Marlins starter Trevor Rogers, while Scherzer went the distance, allowing only a solo home run in the ninth inning by second baseman Isan Díaz. Immediately after the game, Scherzer left the team to be with his family for the birth of his third child.

Coming off their sweep of the Marlins, the Nationals were swept in turn by another division rival, the Atlanta Braves. Before the May 4 game, the Nationals designated utilityman Hernán Pérez for assignment and optioned reliever Kyle McGowin, clearing space on the roster to activate outfielder Juan Soto and setup man Will Harris. But the May 4 game went poorly, as 22-year-old Atlanta starter Huascar Ynoa effectively shut down the Nationals' offense, allowing just one unearned run over seven strong innings—as well as slugging a grand slam off struggling Washington reliever Tanner Rainey in the sixth inning. (Note: Ynoa's grand slam was the first by an MLB pitcher since Anthony DeSclafani hit one for the Cincinnati Reds on June 23, 2018. (See Axisa, Mike, "Braves' Huascar Ynoa becomes first MLB pitcher to hit a grand slam since 2018", CBS Sports, May 5, 2021.)) The Braves won 6–1, with Nationals starter Joe Ross shouldering the loss. The Braves won again on May 5, 5–3, with the help of a Marcell Ozuna grand slam. This time, however, it was a Nationals pitcher who had a notable achievement, as reliever Kyle Finnegan threw the fifth immaculate inning in team history. (Note: The feat had most recently been accomplished for Washington by Stephen Strasburg, who posted an immaculate inning against the Miami Marlins on June 3, 2019. (See Camerato, Jessica, "'On the attack,' Finnegan's outing immaculate", MLB.com, May 5, 2021.)) Coming on in relief of Erick Fedde in the sixth inning, Finnegan struck out Austin Riley, Dansby Swanson, and William Contreras on nine pitches. Meanwhile, Gomes and shortstop Trea Turner homered to account for the Nationals' only runs of the game. The Braves completed the sweep on May 6 as Washington could muster only a pair of runs to back veteran starter Jon Lester, who pitched into the sixth inning while allowing three runs.

The Nationals proceeded to drop two of three to both the New York Yankees in interleague play at Yankee Stadium and the division-rival Philadelphia Phillies at home. On May 7 in New York City, the Yankees led by a run heading into the eighth inning, but the visiting Nationals rallied for six runs, led by a three-run homer by second baseman Josh Harrison. Soto also contributed with a two-homer performance in his first start since being activated from the injured list. The Nationals won 11–4. Unfortunately for Washington, any momentum from the big comeback win was stymied by poor bullpen performances in the ensuing games. A sterling start by Scherzer, making his first appearance May 8 since becoming a father for the third time and pitching into the eighth inning while allowing just one run, was squandered as closer Brad Hand gave up the tying run in the eighth inning and then again after the Nationals took the lead in the ninth inning. Rainey ultimately loaded the bases in the eleventh inning before surrendering the game-winning run on an infield hit by Gleyber Torres. The Nationals once again sent out Hand to attempt to force extra innings on May 9 with the score tied at two runs apiece in the ninth inning, after left fielder Kyle Schwarber hit a seventh-inning home run to erase the Yankees' lead. But as he had the previous night, Hand was unable to keep New York off the board, as Giancarlo Stanton laced a game-winning single against a slider up in the zone for the Yankees' second straight walk-off win.

As Washington's skid continued in Philadelphia, Fedde took the loss again on May 11. Jeered by fans in his first game in front of a crowd at Nationals Park since the 2019 season, former National and Phillies right fielder Bryce Harper hit a deep home run off Fedde that effectively set the tone for the game, a 6–2 Philadelphia victory. Although they returned reliever Wander Suero from the injured list, optioning right-handed swingman Paolo Espino in a corresponding move before game time, the Nationals' losing streak ran to four games as Hand once again collapsed on May 12, spoiling six innings of one-run ball from Lester by blowing the save in the ninth inning on a home run by Phillies center fielder Odúbel Herrera, then combining with Finnegan to give up three more in the tenth inning. After manager Dave Martinez called a team meeting following the loss, the Nationals clambered back into the win column on May 13 behind a stellar start from Corbin, who struck out nine and allowed just one run over seven innings. Schwarber and first baseman Josh Bell got the scoring started early in the 5–1 win, tacking four runs on the board with two-run homers in the first inning. Third baseman Starlin Castro capped the scoring with an RBI double in the sixth inning. As had Scherzer earlier in the month, Corbin left the team after his win to be with his wife, Jen, who gave birth to the couple's first son. Espino was recalled as Corbin was placed on the paternity list.

Heading to Phoenix, the Nationals routed the Arizona Diamondbacks on May 14, winning 17–2 behind five shutout innings from Scherzer and a huge offensive performance by Gomes, who tallied five hits and was just a home run short of hitting for the cycle for the first time in his major league career. On May 15, it was the Diamondbacks' turn to blow out the Nationals, downing the visitors 11–4. Ross battled command issues in his start, coughing up a home run to Arizona third baseman Eduardo Escobar in the fourth inning that accounted for three of the eight earned runs he surrendered in the game. The Nationals rallied to win the series, shutting out the Diamondbacks 3–0 on May 16 behind a resurgent seven-inning performance from Fedde and the bullpen, including Hand, who pitched a scoreless ninth inning for the save. There was no score in the game until the eighth inning, when pinch-hitter Yadiel Hernández put Washington on top with a home run.

Despite a cheering reception from fans, Lester struggled against his former team, the Chicago Cubs, taking the loss on May 17 as the Nationals began a four-game series at Wrigley Field. While Schwarber, also a former Cub, hit a two-run homer in his return to Wrigley Field, Lester allowed three homers of his own, giving up five runs without making it through six full innings. Returning for his first start as a father on May 18, Corbin allowed three runs over five innings, but it was Harris who took the loss, surrendering a two-run home run by David Bote in the sixth inning that broke the tie and put the Cubs on top for good. Optioned to make room on the active roster for Corbin, Espino wasn't down for long, being recalled alongside McGowin the next day when Fedde tested positive for COVID-19 and Rainey was also placed on the COVID-19-related injured list as an unvaccinated close contact. Neither Espino nor McGowin appeared May 19 as the Nationals bounced back to defeat the Cubs, as Scherzer allowed two runs over five innings while striking out eight Chicago players and Soto became just the sixteenth player to homer off the scoreboard at Wrigley Field, blasting a 421 foot (128 m) home run off Cubs starter Jake Arrieta amid a three-hit performance. The Nationals were unable to clinch a series split on May 20, however, despite back-to-back first-inning home runs by Bell and Schwarber, as Ross was wobbly again, allowing four runs before he was knocked out in the fourth inning. The Cubs won 5–2.

Returning home to Nationals Park, the Nationals swept their interleague rivals, the Baltimore Orioles, over a three-game series. Starting pitcher Stephen Strasburg was activated May 21, with McGowin once again optioned to Triple-A Rochester, and earned the win in that night's game by pitching into the sixth inning while allowing just a single hit, although he also walked four Orioles and only struck out one. A high-scoring affair ended in favor of the Nationals, 12–9, the following day. Lester allowed six runs, four of them on one swing by Baltimore first baseman Ryan Mountcastle in the first inning, but the Nationals answered back with a grand slam of their own, courtesy of Harrison in his first career appearance as a center fielder, as they tallied five runs off Orioles starter Bruce Zimmermann. After Zimmermann exited, the Nationals took the lead in the fourth inning on a three-run homer by their own first baseman, longest-tenured National Ryan Zimmerman. Reliever Daniel Hudson was credited with the win as he came on in the eighth inning after Harris failed to retire any of the three batters he faced, and Hand earned the save. Harris was placed on the injured list following the ineffective outing with what the Nationals described as right hand inflammation, a recurring issue for the veteran right-hander. He was joined by center fielder Víctor Robles, who was sidelined with a sprained right ankle. McGowin was once again recalled to the active roster. On May 23, the shorthanded Nationals eked out a win even after Corbin gave up three runs in the first inning, as they scored four in a bottom of the first highlighted by a two-run Schwarber homer, then rallied again after the Orioles tied the game with their fourth run off Corbin to take the lead on a sacrifice fly by Turner. Soto made a mental mistake as he didn't run out a popup around home plate batting after Turner, allowing catcher Pedro Severino, his former Nationals teammate, to throw him out at first base even after failing to catch the skied ball. Martinez told the media after the game that Soto's mistake was "embarrassing for the whole club" and that at his behest, Soto apologized to his teammates, even though the Nationals held on to win the game.

Rainy weather rolled into the Washington, D.C., metropolitan area as the Nationals hosted the Cincinnati Reds and Milwaukee Brewers from the National League Central Division, but the Nationals' hitters did little to bring the rain themselves. On May 25, the Nationals narrowly avoided a shutout when Bell homered in the ninth inning, but the lack of offense doomed them and consigned Scherzer to a hard-luck loss after he allowed just two runs, on solo home runs, over seven innings. The Nationals led 3–0 in the fourth inning on May 26 when rain forced that game to be suspended. After clearing COVID-19 protocols, Rainey was activated from the injured list for McGowin the following day. The Nationals held on to win the suspended game 5–3 despite an unsteady performance by Hudson in the eighth inning, getting crucial insurance runs after recently recalled infielder Luis García Jr. delivered a pinch-hit triple in the sixth. But the bats went silent in a shutout loss that evening, in a seven-inning game. Strasburg took the loss as he gave up all three Reds runs, including a leadoff home run by Eugenio Suárez, over five innings of work. Following that series loss to the Reds, the Brewers swept the Nationals over three games, including both ends of a May 29 doubleheader after a scheduled May 28 game was rained out. The home team mustered just three runs over the series against Milwaukee, including another 3–0 shutout loss on May 30 as Scherzer once again did not receive run support from his teammates. The Nationals also received bad news May 30 as Harris was diagnosed with thoracic outlet syndrome, which required season-ending surgery to address.

At month's end, García was sent back to Triple-A Rochester and Robles was activated from the injured list, having recovered quickly from his sprained ankle. On the field, the last-place Nationals' woes continued as they traveled to Atlanta and were unable to recover from a three-run first inning authored by Ross. They lost the first of four games versus the Braves, falling to 21–29 on the season and finishing with an 11–17 record in May.

=== June ===
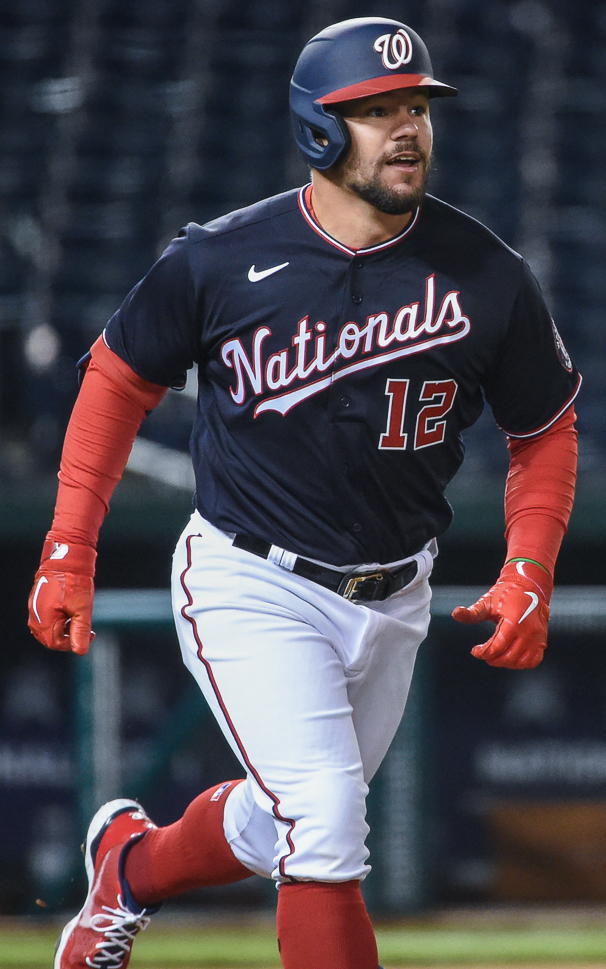
Kyle Schwarber set a franchise record for home runs in a month, going on a historic tear at the plate, in June.

The Nationals opened June with a series split against the division-rival Atlanta Braves on the road. After the Braves won May 31, the Nationals answered back with wins on June 1 and June 2. In the former game, Strasburg was struck on the glove by a line drive comebacker by William Contreras in the second inning and pulled from the game as a precautionary measure, having allowed a run in a wobbly first inning. Reliever Austin Voth provided three innings in long relief, allowing two runs on a Ronald Acuña Jr. home run, and earned the win in the 11–6 game. Right fielder Juan Soto and first baseman Ryan Zimmerman were major contributors to the Nationals' efforts on offense, both hitting two-run homers in the game. The following day, although Strasburg had escaped serious injury as a result of the Contreras comebacker, the Nationals placed him on the injured list once again with what they described as a right neck strain. The Nationals called on veteran Jon Lester to pitch on three days' rest in the June 2 game, and he pitched into the sixth inning, allowing one run. Top setup man Daniel Hudson struggled again and suffered a blown save in the seventh inning when Ozzie Albies doubled in a pair of runs, but batterymate Yan Gomes picked him up with a go-ahead home run in the top of the eighth, and shortstop Trea Turner tacked on an insurance run with a single in the ninth. Closer Brad Hand shut the Braves down to save the 5–3 contest. Washington failed to secure a series win on June 3, however, as starter Patrick Corbin ran into trouble and couldn't escape the sixth inning, and the Nationals didn't score their first run until the ninth. The visitors lost 5–1.

Although ace starter Max Scherzer once again did not benefit from much run support on June 4 as the Nationals took on the Philadelphia Phillies, he got just enough to win. Scherzer pitched into the eighth inning, allowing just one run, and the Nationals' go-ahead run in the sixth inning courtesy of a Soto homer held up in the 2–1 finish. That ended up being the Nationals' only win of the three-game series in Philadelphia. On June 5, Washington starting pitcher Joe Ross accounted for the team's only hit through the first six innings, and Ross was rocked for a three-run home run by Andrew McCutchen after first baseman Josh Bell booted a routine groundball in the fourth inning. Despite not being charged with an earned run in the appearance, Ross shouldered the loss in the 5–2 game. Bell, who had committed the crucial error, supplied his team's only scoring offense with a two-run home run late in the game. The Nationals gave up twelve runs in the rubber game the following day. The game was filled with mishaps, some of them dangerous. Washington's spot starter, Voth, exited early after he was hit in the face by a Vince Velasquez fastball in his first plate appearance. Although the visitors rallied for three runs against former Nationals reliever Brandon Kintzler, relievers Sam Clay, Kyle Finnegan, Paolo Espino, and Tanner Rainey all struggled mightily, the latter of the quartet surrendering a three-run home run by J. T. Realmuto to give the game its final score, 12–6. The game was interrupted in the eighth inning, with the Nationals at bat, when the protective netting behind home plate collapsed, forcing a lengthy game delay.

Before beginning a two-game interleague series visiting the Tampa Bay Rays, the Nationals placed Voth on the injured list with a broken nose, suffered when he was struck by Velasquez's pitch in Philadelphia. To replace Voth in the bullpen, they recalled right-hander Ryne Harper from Triple-A Rochester. That two-game set ended up as a split, with the Nationals losing 3–1 on June 8 and winning 9–7 on June 9. Tampa Bay starter Tyler Glasnow handily outdueled Lester in the former game, as Lester exited in the fourth inning after issuing four walks. Reliever Wander Suero allowed back-to-back walks that led to two runs scoring in the fifth inning, giving the Rays a lead they would not relinquish. While their pitching struggled more in the latter game, the Nationals' bats roared to life. Gifted a two-run lead right away, courtesy of a Soto home run, Corbin responded by walking the bases loaded to start the bottom of the first inning. All three runs scored before Corbin settled in to pitch through five innings, with the three runs in the first inning the only damage against him. Leading by a pair of runs into the seventh inning, the Nationals watched the thin lead disintegrate. Finnegan gave up a run in the seventh, then Hudson was saddled with his second blown save in a week's span as he was tagged for a game-tying home run by Joey Wendle in the eighth. The Nationals opened extra innings by scoring twice in the top of the tenth inning, but Hand gave both runs back (one being the unearned automatic baserunner) in his second inning of work, with Wendle again delivering the game-tying hit with a single. The Nationals again scored twice in the top of the eleventh inning, and this time, Rainey was able to close out the game for his first career save.

Returning home, the Nationals were greeted by rain. A June 10 tilt against the visiting San Francisco Giants was scrapped by inclement weather. For the Nationals, the series opener on June 11 was little worth the wait—Anthony DeSclafani shut them out, allowing two hits over nine complete innings, after Scherzer exited just twelve pitches into the game with inflammation in a groin muscle. Coming on in long relief of Scherzer, Espino pitched well, followed by a shutout from the rest of the Nationals' bullpen, but the Giants did all the damage they needed on a solo home run by Buster Posey off Espino in the fourth inning. Playing the makeup of the canceled June 10 game, the Nationals returned the favor the next day, with Erick Fedde returning from a stint on the injured list for COVID-19 to strike out seven Giants over five innings and lead a seven-inning shutout. Left fielder Kyle Schwarber slugged a leadoff home run against Giants starter Kevin Gausman, which turned out to be all the offense the home team needed in the contest. The Nationals handed the ball to right-hander Jefry Rodríguez, whose contract was selected from Triple-A Rochester with outfielder Yadiel Hernández optioned down, for the nightcap, and he rewarded them with four uneven but scoreless innings. Neither team managed to plate a run until extra innings, with the scoring opened courtesy of MLB's automatic baserunner rule. Finnegan allowed both the unearned runner and a second earned run to score, then after third baseman Starlin Castro doubled home the unearned runner in the bottom of the eighth inning, center fielder Víctor Robles was hit by a pitch and subsequently attempted to tag up from first base to reach second on a flyout by Bell. While Castro advanced to third, Robles overslid second base and was called out. The game ended on a Turner popout. Manager Dave Martinez was critical of Robles in postgame comments, describing his aggressive play for second base as "not a very smart decision". The Nationals salvaged the series split in the four-game set the following day, coming out on the winning side of the third shutout of the series, 5–0. Ross turned in one of the best starts of his career, striking out nine Giants over eight innings. Schwarber hit another leadoff home run, then followed it up with a home run in his second at-bat of the game. All five Nationals runs, four of them earned, were charged to Giants starter Johnny Cueto.

Even with Scherzer and Strasburg on the shelf, Washington's strong pitching performances continued. Over three games starting June 14, the Nationals swept the last-place Pittsburgh Pirates at Nationals Park, holding them to four total runs in the series after limiting the Giants to three runs over four games previously. They won the series opener 3–2 behind a solid start by Lester and effective work from the bullpen, with the winning run scored on another home run by Schwarber, this time off Clay Holmes in the seventh inning. Gomes and Turner led the way on June 15, with the former contributing a first-inning grand slam and the latter notching four hits, along with Corbin, who pitched into the ninth inning while allowing just one run. Scherzer officially landed on the injured list with groin inflammation that day, and the Nationals selected the contract of right-handed reliever Justin Miller to replace him on the roster, designating Triple-A pitcher Rogelio Armenteros for assignment to clear space on the roster. The following day, the Nationals made another move, placing Castro on the restricted list to attend to an unspecified family matter and recalling infielder Luis García Jr. from Triple-A. The roster shakeup pressed Espino into duty in the starting rotation, and on June 16, he earned his first major league win at age 34, pitching five scoreless innings against the Pirates. Bell and Gomes homered to put the Nationals over the top in the 3–1 game.

Following a flurry of roster moves as Castro and Voth were activated, Harper was optioned, and outfielder Andrew Stevenson was placed on the injured list with an oblique strain, the Nationals won another shutout game on June 18. Hosting the division-rival New York Mets, the Nationals broke a scoreless tie in the ninth inning as Gomes snuck a base hit up the left field line to drive in Soto and pin a loss on Mets closer Edwin Díaz. Fedde turned in a strong start with seven scoreless innings. For the first time in ten days, the Nationals allowed more than two runs as the Mets struck back for a 5–1 win in the first game of a doubleheader the following day, a makeup of the Opening Day contest that was canceled by the Nationals' first COVID-19 outbreak. Mets shortstop Francisco Lindor drove in all five of his team's runs in the matinee, including via a pair of home runs, while David Peterson and the New York bullpen stifled the Nationals' offense. Reliever Aaron Loup allowed the only RBI hit by the Nationals in the game, a fifth-inning single by Soto, as Ross took the loss. The Nationals answered back to capture the nightcap 6-2, with Lester finally earning his first win of the season, buoyed by another two-homer performance by Schwarber. On June 20, the Nationals secured the series win behind Corbin and an enormous day for the red-hot Schwarber. As Corbin pitched six innings of two-run ball in the start, Schwarber slugged three home runs, including yet another leadoff homer. (Note: Schwarber's three-homer performance was the first by a Nationals hitter since Anthony Rendon, also versus the New York Mets, on April 30, 2017, and tied a major league record for home runs over two days with five. (See "Schwarber hits 3 homers, Nats beat Mets 5-2, take 3 of 4", The Associated Press, June 20, 2021, and Walsh, Erin, "Nationals' Kyle Schwarber ties MLB record with five home runs in two-game span", Yardbarker, June 20, 2021.)) The June 20 game also notably marked the return of outfielder Gerardo Parra, a fan favorite from the 2019 Washington Nationals season, whose contract was selected from Triple-A Rochester in place of García, who was optioned back down; Triple-A pitcher Ben Braymer was designated for assignment in a corresponding move. Parra stepped up to the plate for a pinch-hit appearance in the seventh inning to his familiar walkup music, Pinkfong's "Baby Shark", and cranked a double, to the delight of the home crowd of 30,371.

The Nationals made a quick two-game stop back in Philadelphia, where they swept the Phillies. Scherzer returned from the injured list on June 22, with Finnegan headed to the injured list with a hamstring strain in a corresponding move, and led his team to a 3–2 win. The game marked the first in which Nationals pitchers had to submit to regular inspections for foreign substances as MLB cracked down on the use of so-called "sticky stuff". Phillies manager Joe Girardi asked for an additional inspection of Scherzer after two regular checks had already been performed. After Scherzer, who was deemed clean, stared down Girardi after a strikeout to end the fifth inning, then brandished his glove and cap in the dugout as players and coaches traded insults, Girardi erupted from the home dugout and was summarily ejected from the game. On June 23, the Nationals came out on top in a 13–12 slugfest. Fedde allowed five unanswered runs over four innings, including a three-run homer by Travis Jankowski in the second inning, but the Nationals roared back, and Schwarber hit a three-run homer off Archie Bradley to tie the game in the fifth inning. Nationals reliever Kyle McGowin immediately handed it back, giving up a pinch-hit McCutchen grand slam—answered then in the top of the sixth by two-run Turner single followed by a grand slam by McCutchen's former Pittsburgh teammate, Bell. (Note: With Jankowski and Schwarber's three-run home runs and McCutchen and Bell's grand slams, this marked the first time in MLB history in which both teams hit a three-run homer and a grand slam in the same game. (See Starr, Gabrielle, "Phillies and Nationals Did Something Never Done Before in MLB History", That Ball's Outta Here, June 24, 2021.)) The Phillies rallied again off the Nationals' bullpen, pinning a blown save on Rainey in the eighth inning and taking the lead on singles by Alec Bohm and Ronald Torreyes, but Castro delivered the lead back to the Nationals with a two-run single in the ninth off Héctor Neris. Espino came on for the ninth inning and locked down his first career save, working around a two-out error in which second baseman Jordy Mercer was hit in the face by a J. T. Realmuto bounding ball.

Continuing a run of games against National League East Division competitors, the Nationals next traveled to Miami to challenge the Miami Marlins in a four-game series. The visitors enjoyed another two-homer game by Schwarber, who hammered a leadoff home run into the second deck and then hit a three-run homer in the second inning off Marlins starter Cody Poteet, and a strong seven-inning performance from Ross. Miami finally got on the board in the eighth inning, when Miller served up a three-run home run to Jazz Chisholm Jr., but ultimately fell, 7–3. The Marlins drubbed the Nationals on June 25, taking them down by an 11–2 score, ending the team's second five-game winning streak of the month. Lester labored, giving up seven runs and getting knocked out in the third inning, while Pablo López tossed six innings for the Marlins. One of the two runs López allowed was a solo home run by Schwarber in the third inning, with Zimmerman singling in Turner for the other. The series ended in a split, as the Marlins took the third game over Corbin on June 26 and the Nationals won June 27 behind Scherzer. The Nationals' hottest hitter, Schwarber, was held hitless in both contests.

Injuries persisted even as the Nationals continued their strongest stretch of the season to date. The Nationals returned Fedde to the injured list, this time with an oblique strain, and recalled right-handed reliever Andrés Machado from Triple-A Rochester. Making up another game from the canceled opening series of the season, the Nationals hosted the Mets for a single game on June 28, which they won 8–4. Espino started in place of Fedde, twirling five shutout innings. Schwarber homered twice, including to lead off the game. Turner also homered immediately after Schwarber in the bottom of the first, and Parra homered in the second. After the Mets got within a run by homering twice off Miller in the eighth inning, Zimmerman answered with a three-run home run. Hand, who relieved Miller in the eighth inning, pitched a clean ninth inning, earning a save despite the Nationals winning by four runs. With the win, the Nationals' win–loss record improved to 38–38 for the season, the first time they were at .500 since May 2. The following day, the Nationals designated Miller for assignment and placed Rainey on the injured list with a stress reaction in his right tibia. Harper was recalled, joined in the bullpen by left-hander Kyle Lobstein, whose contract the Nationals selected from Triple-A Rochester, although neither pitched in the June 29 game as the Nats hosted the Rays. For the second straight game, Schwarber homered to lead off for the Nationals, followed by Soto for his first home run at Nationals Park in 2021. Robles also hit his first homer of the year. Ross gave up two runs as he pitched into the seventh inning, earning the win as the Nationals moved above .500. The Nationals finished out the two-game sweep over Tampa Bay on June 30 in convincing fashion, winning 15–6. On his 28th birthday, Turner hit for the cycle for the third time in his career. (Note: Turner became the fifth player in MLB history to hit for the cycle three times in his career, joining Adrián Beltré, Babe Herman, Bob Meusel, and "Long John" Reilly. (See Axisa, Mike, "Nationals' Trea Turner hits for cycle on his birthday, ties MLB record in the process", CBS Sports, June 30, 2021.)) However, sliding into third base for a triple to complete the cycle, Turner jammed his finger and was lifted from the game. Soto was also removed with a left hamstring cramp. Mercer finished the game but was later reported to be dealing with pain in his right quadriceps. Lester gave up five runs in the game, and Lobstein struggled in his Nationals debut, collecting just one out in the ninth inning before McGowin relieved him. Despite entering the game on a hot streak, Schwarber went hitless, ending with sixteen home runs in June. (Note: Schwarber set an MLB record for leadoff home runs in a month and tied the record for most first-inning home runs in a month, previously set by Carl Yastrzemski for the Boston Red Sox in June 1969 and matched by Alfonso Soriano for the Chicago Cubs in September 2007, with seven; tied an MLB record, previously set by Albert Belle for the Cleveland Indians in 2005, for home runs in a ten-game stretch with twelve; tied an MLB record, previously set by Sammy Sosa for the Chicago Cubs in 1998 and matched by Barry Bonds for the San Francisco Giants in 2001, for home runs in an eighteen-game stretch with sixteen; and set a franchise record (Montreal Expos–Washington Nationals) for most home runs in a month with sixteen, surpassing Bryce Harper for the Nationals in May 2015 and Vladimir Guerrero Sr. for the Expos in September 2000, who held the previous record with thirteen apiece. (See Brew, Tom, "A June For the Ages: Kyle Schwarber Sets Baseball World on Fire", Sports Illustrated, July 3, 2021; Schoenfield, David, "Kyle Schwarber has 16 home runs in 18 games, and shows no signs of letting up", ESPN, June 29, 2021; and Weyrich, Matt, "Schwarber sets Nats record for most home runs in a month", NBC Sports Washington, June 28, 2021.)) Schwarber was named the NL Player of the Month for June, his first such honor.

The Nationals posted a winning record in June at 19–9, their first month with a win–loss record above .500 since September 2019 and their winningest month since August 2019. They ended the month with a 40–38 record, two games behind the Mets for first place in the NL East.

=== July ===
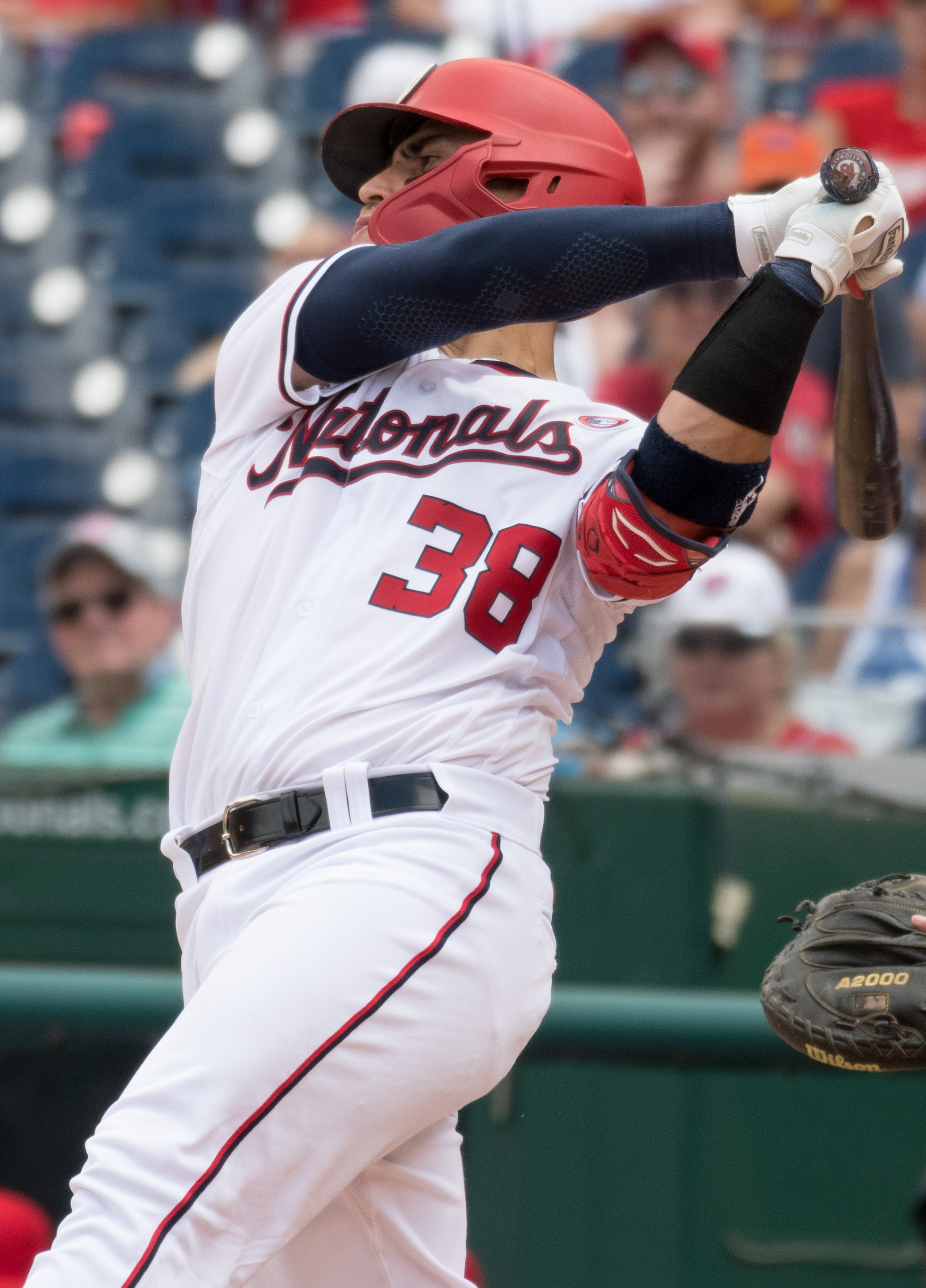
Facing injuries to both their veteran catchers, the Nationals called up prospect Tres Barrera in July.

Coming off their best month in nearly two years, the Nationals immediately ran into an obstacle in July: the defending world champion Los Angeles Dodgers, who arrived in Washington, D.C., for a four-game series and summarily swept their hosts. The July 1 series opener was truncated by rain, ending with the Dodgers up 6–2 in the fifth inning. The shorthanded Nationals turned to backup catcher Alex Avila to make his first career start at second base, with both usual shortstop Trea Turner and utility infielder Jordy Mercer day-to-day with injuries. With Patrick Corbin on the mound, the Nationals led by a run into the fifth inning, but A. J. Pollock hit a home run that cleared the left-field wall by feet, before the Dodgers loaded the bases and unloaded them again on a grand slam by Max Muncy. A downpour foreclosed any possibility of the Nationals rallying back, as play was stopped minutes later and the game was later called. The Nationals again were off to a strong start July 2, as Max Scherzer pitched six innings of one-run ball against Los Angeles, but the Dodgers battled back once Washington's ace was out of the game. Mookie Betts singled in a pair of runs off Nationals reliever Austin Voth, pinning him with a blown save and giving the Dodgers the lead in the seventh inning, part of a nine-run outburst that put the game out of reach. The Nationals fell, 10–5. Of more significant concern, however, the Nationals were forced to take star left fielder Kyle Schwarber out of the game after he pulled up lame rounding first base on a second-inning base hit. The injury to Schwarber came on the same day that Washington placed Mercer on the injured list with a right quadriceps strain and selected the contract of journeyman shortstop Humberto Arteaga, and it led to an IL stint for Schwarber as well as he was diagnosed with what the team called a "significant" right hamstring strain. Additionally, after playing second base two days earlier, Avila landed on the injured list with bilateral calf strains on July 3. The Nationals also cut Arteaga after he went hitless with a sacrifice fly in his sole game with the major league team, designating him for assignment, and acquired Alcides Escobar in a minor deal with the Kansas City Royals, sending cash considerations for the veteran infielder playing for the Triple-A Omaha Storm Chasers and immediately selecting his contract to join the team in Washington. Catcher Tres Barrera and outfielder Yadiel Hernández were recalled from Triple-A Rochester. The July 3 game saw the Dodgers take a three-run lead in the fourth inning against Paolo Espino but the Nationals answered with a three-run home run by catcher Yan Gomes off Dodgers ace Clayton Kershaw. After a rain delay, the Dodgers went on the attack, taking advantage of a botched double-play by the new up-the-middle combo of Nationals shortstop Escobar and second baseman Josh Harrison to plate the go-ahead run on an infield single by A. J. Pollock off reliever Wander Suero in the sixth inning, while shutting out the Nationals the rest of the way. The loss dropped the Nationals' win–loss record back under the .500 mark, at 40–41. The Nationals' bats were quiet as the Dodgers completed the sweep, 4–1, in the traditional morning Independence Day game on July 4. Starter Joe Ross pitched fairly well, striking out eleven Dodgers and allowing three runs as he pitched into the seventh inning, but the Nationals grounded into three inning-ending double plays over the course of the game, including by Barrera in the ninth inning to end it.

The Nationals broke into the win column for the month as they visited the San Diego Padres on a West Coast roadtrip, beginning July 5. After a first-inning home run by the returning Turner, the Nationals squandered an early five-run lead, as the Padres answered back to tie the game off Washington starting pitcher Jon Lester in the fourth inning. However, first baseman Josh Bell put the visitors on top with a seventh-inning home run, part of a three-hit day for Bell as well as Escobar, and the Padres couldn't mount a second comeback. The Padres rebounded to even the series at one win apiece on July 6, greeting starting pitcher Erick Fedde rudely, as he and reliever Kyle Finnegan returned from the injured list to replace optioned relievers Ryne Harper and Kyle Lobstein. Fedde allowed three runs in the fourth inning, but after Harrison hit a three-run homer to answer, manager Dave Martinez sent his starter back out to the mound to begin the fifth inning. Fedde put two runners on base before being relieved by Sam Clay, who let in both inherited runners plus one of his own. The Nationals were unable to recover, falling 7–4. Harper returned to the active roster the following day, as Ross was placed on the injured list with what the Nationals described as right elbow inflammation. Despite the mounting injuries, the Nationals enjoyed a romp at PETCO Park that evening, as Corbin led a 15–5 blowout of the Padres. Right fielder Juan Soto opened the scoring with a three-run home run in the first inning off Padres starter Chris Paddack, setting the tone for a game in which neither San Diego's starting pitcher nor its bullpen could slow down the Nationals' offense. The Nationals' scoring frenzy carried into the July 8 game, the series finale in San Diego, as they ran roughshod over San Diego ace Yu Darvish and opened up an eight-run lead by the fourth inning with Scherzer silencing the home team's hitters. In the fourth inning, however, Scherzer unraveled. Padres shortstop Fernando Tatís Jr. answered his Washington counterpart Turner's second home run of the game by opening the fourth with a long solo home run off Scherzer. With one out, Scherzer loaded the bases and walked in a run before striking out catcher Victor Caratini to get within one out of escaping the jam with a six-run lead intact. Padres manager Jayce Tingler opted not to go to a pinch-hitter, sending rookie reliever Daniel Camarena to the plate. Scherzer quickly got ahead with two strikes and tried to finish off the inning by enticing a swing and a miss on a 97 miles per hour (156 km/h) fastball below the knees; instead, Camarena swung and connected, pulling a grand slam home run into the stands beyond right field. (Note: Camarena was the first relief pitcher to hit a grand slam in an MLB game since Don Robinson for the Pittsburgh Pirates on September 12, 1985, and the first pitcher to hit a grand slam for his first career hit since Bill Duggleby for the Philadelphia Phillies on April 21, 1898. (See "Slam Diego: Daniel Camarena hits most improbable home run in MLB history", Salituro, David, Fansided, July 8, 2021, and "Former El Paso Chihuahuas Daniel Camarena hits MLB grand slam", Chavez, Felix F., El Paso Times, July 9, 2021.)) Tatís drove in another run on a single to cap the Padres' seven-run inning, which closed the deficit to just a run. The Nationals' bats went quiet as they were held to one hit for the rest of the game, while Tommy Pham doubled in the game-tying run in the sixth inning and then scored on Trent Grisham's walk-off single off Clay in the ninth.

Coming off the stunner in San Diego, the Nationals were swept over three games against the first-place San Francisco Giants. Clay took the loss for a second straight game on July 9, giving up a go-ahead home run in the fifth inning to Darin Ruf after starter Paolo Espino exited. Gomes, the Nationals' hot-hitting catcher, came out of the game with a left oblique strain after taking warmup tosses in the second inning. Nationals center fielder Gerardo Parra was thrown out at home plate attempting to score in both the fourth and seventh innings, then grounded into a rally-ending double play in the eighth inning. With Gomes sidelined, the Nationals placed him on the injured list and selected the contract of Triple-A catcher Jakson Reetz, designating Lobstein for assignment to clear a roster spot. As he had in a game the previous month, Giants starter Anthony DeSclafani dominated the Nationals on July 10, pitching six scoreless innings while his teammates beat up on Lester, who again could not get through the third inning. McGowin was also hit hard, ultimately landing on the injured list the next day. While the Nationals mounted a rally against the Giants' bullpen, keyed by a two-run triple by Escobar and a pinch-hit double by Reetz in his major league debut, the visitors came up well short in the 10–4 loss. Washington managed to score just once in the final game before the All-Star Break, and Fedde took the loss as he allowed three runs over five innings.

Four Nationals were named as National League All-Stars: Schwarber, Scherzer, Soto, and Turner. Schwarber was injured and unable to participate in the All-Star Game on July 13, which Scherzer started for the National League. Soto also participated in the Home Run Derby, advancing to the second round over favorite Shohei Ohtani of the Los Angeles Angels and setting a new Home Run Derby record with a 520 foot (160 m) homer at Coors Field, before falling to defending champion and eventual winner Pete Alonso of the New York Mets.

As the season resumed on July 16, Nationals third baseman Starlin Castro was placed on administrative leave by Major League Baseball over an alleged violation of the league's policy against domestic violence, which an investigation ultimately substantiated. The Nationals distanced themselves from Castro, with Martinez telling reporters he was "shocked" by the news. "We don't tolerate that kind of behavior," Martinez said. To replace Castro on the active roster, the Nationals activated Mercer from the injured list. They also announced the signing of veteran catcher René Rivera to a major league contract, replacing Reetz as their backup catcher, as Reetz was optioned to Triple-A Rochester. In a rematch with the Padres at Nationals Park, Washington gave up the most runs in a game in franchise history as San Diego cruised, 24–8. (Note: The 24 runs allowed by the Nationals surpassed a previous team high of eighteen runs allowed against the Florida Marlins on July 5, 2006, which had been matched against the Arizona Diamondbacks on August 3, 2019, and the sixteen-run margin of defeat eclipsed the previous record set in a 15–0 loss to the Cincinnati Reds on April 5, 2013. (See Reddington, Patrick, "Washington Nationals' record-setting, 24-8 loss San Diego Padres one to brush off and move on from...", Federal Baseball, July 17, 2021.)) Padres second baseman Jake Cronenworth hit for the cycle, while Wil Myers homered twice, including a grand slam off Fedde in the second inning. The July 17 game was headed toward another Nationals defeat when, as Finnegan was walking off the mound after striking out Myers in the top of the sixth inning, a series of gunshots were fired outside the stadium. Panicked fans stormed the field, some taking cover in both the home and visiting dugout and clubhouse, and the game was suspended until July 18. No one inside Nationals Park was wounded by the gunfire. The Nationals dropped the continuation of the game on July 18 but bounced back to win the regularly scheduled game that day to avoid the series sweep and end a six-game losing streak, overcoming four runs allowed by Scherzer over seven innings and then a blown save by closer Brad Hand to pin a blown save and a loss on former Nationals closer Mark Melancon, now of the Padres. Escobar delivered the walk-off hit off Melancon, lofting a flyball over Grisham in center field to bring home Barrera in the bottom of the ninth.

The Nationals carried their winning forward into the first two games against the division-rival Miami Marlins, blowing out the last-place Miami team by a score of 18–1 on July 19. Lester turned in his best start as a National, going seven scoreless innings and contributing to the offense with a three-run homer to deep center field off Marlins reliever David Hess. Rookie catcher Barrera also hit his first career home run in the contest, a missile into the Red Porch off former National Ross Detwiler to lead off the bottom of the second. The Nationals scored early and often, knocking out Detwiler in the second inning and sticking him with the loss. They won again July 20. Espino turned in five scoreless innings in his start, but Voth couldn't hold the two-run lead in the sixth inning. While the Nationals rallied the next inning and ultimately won the game, the official scorer determined that the win should instead be awarded to Finnegan, who pitched effectively in the seventh inning and would have earned a hold in the game, invoking an obscure rule that gives the scorer discretion when a reliever is ineffective but had not been invoked since the 2013 season. However, the decision was reconsidered and the win instead given to Voth. Despite six strong innings by Fedde, the modest three-game winning streak for the Nationals came to an end July 21, when the Marlins took advantage of the extra-innings automatic baserunner rule to break a 1–1 tie in the top of the tenth inning. Jorge Alfaro belted a go-ahead double off Hand, followed by a Miguel Rojas sacrifice fly, and the Marlins won 3–1.

After having been swept by their interleague rivals back in May, the Baltimore Orioles returned the favor as they hosted the Nationals for three games. Corbin was shelled on July 23 as the Orioles held the Nationals to a single run, on a solo home run by Bell in the fourth inning. On July 24, and with trade rumors beginning to swirl, the Nationals were set to send out Scherzer versus Matt Harvey. Instead, Scherzer was scratched with what the Nationals described as right triceps discomfort, and Harvey dominated the Nationals, one-hitting them for his six innings of work, as Lester was hit for three runs as the visitors' replacement starter. Although the Nationals were able to come up with their first run in the seventh on a Soto homer, followed by a two-run single by Turner in the eighth, they could not solve Dillon Tate in the ninth inning and lost, 5–3. The Nationals were poised to salvage the series as they led by one run in the ninth inning on July 25, but Hand loaded the bases with no outs before allowing a game-tying sacrifice fly. A groundball to third baseman Carter Kieboom, who was recalled to replace Mercer on the active roster after Mercer landed back on the injured list with a calf strain, was fielded cleanly, but Kieboom's throw to the catcher Barrera was too late to cut down Ryan McKenna, who scored the winning run as the Orioles walked off.

The Nationals changed venues but experienced much the same result on July 26 as they visited the division-rival Philadelphia Phillies. Although Hand inherited a two-run lead this time, following an effective start from Ross in his return from the injured list, the Nationals' closer allowed a leadoff double by Jean Segura, then walked Bryce Harper. After J. T. Realmuto struck out, Andrew McCutchen crushed a three-run opposite-field homer for the win, sticking Hand with his fifth blown save of the season. Even as the Nationals' shot at contention slipped away, Hand achieved some measure of redemption the following day, as he faced a similar situation in the ninth—three outs to get, up by two runs, facing Segura—and worked around a two-base error by Kieboom for a scoreless inning and his 21st save as a National. The game was overshadowed, however, by Turner's early exit after he and the team learned he had tested positive for COVID-19. The scheduled July 28 game was pushed to July 29 after eleven more Nationals personnel, including three more players—Voth, Avila, and reliever Daniel Hudson—tested positive for COVID-19 as well. Martinez said none of the twelve were experiencing serious symptoms and all but one had been vaccinated. The COVID-19 outbreak was reported just 24 hours after starting pitcher Stephen Strasburg was officially diagnosed with thoracic outlet syndrome after being shut down from a planned return to the team, requiring season-ending surgery. Prior to the July 29 doubleheader, the Nationals announced that Hand had been traded to the Toronto Blue Jays for catcher Riley Adams, whom Washington assigned to Triple-A Rochester. The Nationals tabbed Scherzer, who reported feeling no more triceps discomfort, to start in the first game as scouts from rival organizations looked on from the stands at Citizens Bank Park. Scherzer rewarded the Nationals with six strong innings, allowing just a solo home run to Realmuto, before Finnegan locked down the seventh-inning save, the first of his career. Harrison doubled twice in the game, and in his return from the injured list, Gomes gave the Nationals the lead with a two-run homer in the seventh. Scherzer earned his 92nd and last win in his seven-season run with the Nationals, as hours after the first game ended, rumors began to circulate that the Nationals were deep into discussions with the Padres, and then the Dodgers, to trade Scherzer. Meanwhile, on the field, the Nationals built a seven-run lead over the Phillies in the second game, then watched it disintegrate as Corbin and the bullpen couldn't hold back the Philadelphia offense. Rainey, just activated from the injured list, gave up a game-tying single by Realmuto before Clay surrendered an eighth-inning walk-off grand slam by Brad Miller.

Within hours of the walk-off loss, the Nationals began announcing more trades. Schwarber, still working back from his hamstring strain, was shipped to the Boston Red Sox for minor league pitcher Aldo Ramírez. Hudson, freshly placed on the COVID-19-related injured list, was traded to the Padres for reliever Mason Thompson and minor league infielder Jordy Barley in a deal announced just after midnight on the East Coast. Later that day, Gomes and Harrison were traded together in a deal for three minor league prospects, headlined by catcher Drew Millas, from the Oakland Athletics. In the biggest trade at the deadline, the Nationals sent Scherzer and Turner to the Dodgers for four prospects: catcher Keibert Ruiz, starting pitcher Josiah Gray, Double-A pitcher Gerardo Carrillo, and Double-A outfielder Donovan Casey. The Nationals finished their selloff, the team's largest since moving to Washington in 2005, by fencing Lester to the St. Louis Cardinals for outfielder Lane Thomas.

Replacing the losses to their roster, the Nationals selected the contract of relief prospect Gabe Klobosits and longtime infield farmhand Adrián Sánchez from Triple-A Rochester on July 30, then recalled their newly acquired reliever Thompson on July 31, as they faced the similarly trade-depleted Chicago Cubs at home. Klobosits gave up a run on a pair of hits in his major league debut on July 30, while another fresh roster addition, infielder Luis García Jr., hit a home run to help lead Espino and the Nationals over the Cubs. The Cubs evened the series on July 31, hammering Ross for five runs—four of them scoring in the fourth inning, thanks in part to a two-run shot to straightaway center by Rafael Ortega—and knocking him out in the fifth inning. Long man Jefry Rodríguez negotiated three innings of relief, allowing one more run, while battling command issues. After being stymied by Cubs starter Kyle Hendricks over seven innings, in which Hendricks allowed just one run on a Hernández double, the Nationals brought the tying run to the plate twice in the eighth inning but failed to cash in. Soto grounded into a double play to end the game in the ninth inning.

The Nationals finished a difficult July with a win–loss record of 8–18, well under the break-even point for the season with an overall record of 48–56. They fell 7 1/2 games behind the first-place Mets while clinging to fourth place in the National League East Division.

=== August ===
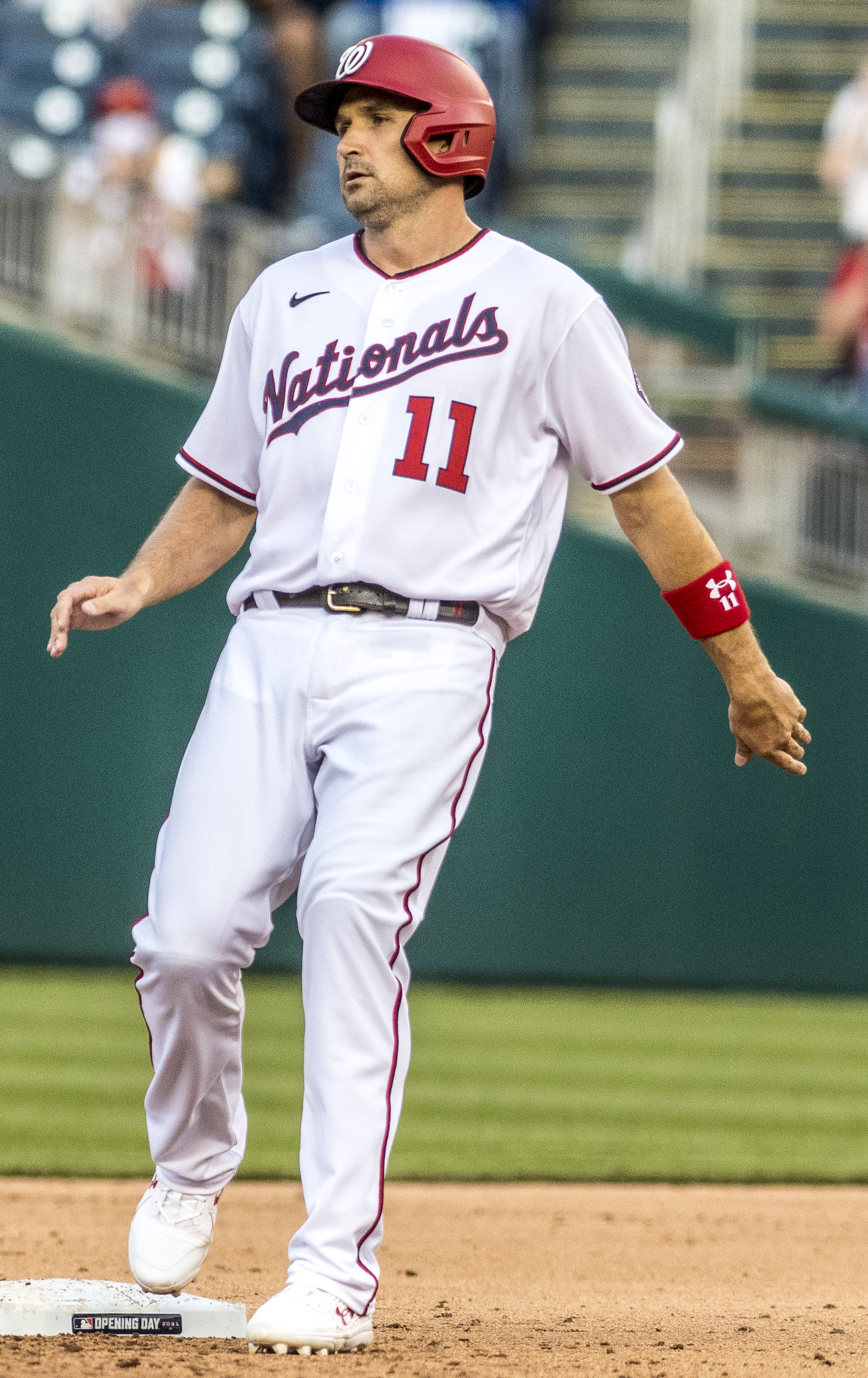
In August, Ryan Zimmerman, the Nationals' first pick in the 2005 draft, set a franchise record for games played.

The Nationals opened August by winning the rubber game of their three-game series with the Chicago Cubs. Although Cubs center fielder Rafael Ortega hit three home runs in the game, accounting for all five Chicago runs driven in, the Nationals topped the Cubs with a multi-homer performance from one of their own outfielders: left fielder Yadiel Hernández, who gave Washington the walk-off win with a home run, his second of the day, off rookie reliever Manuel Rodríguez to lead off the bottom of the ninth inning.

Next up, the division-rival Philadelphia Phillies swept a four-game series at Nationals Park. Freshly recalled to his new team, with reliever Tanner Rainey optioned to the minors in a corresponding move, Nationals starting pitcher Josiah Gray allowed just one run over five innings, striking out two while inducing weak flyballs and popups, on August 2. In his own Nationals debut, newly acquired reliever Mason Thompson worked a scoreless inning in relief. But after rookie Gabe Klobosits retired the side on four pitches in the eighth inning, manager Dave Martinez opted to give Klobosits a chance for the save in the ninth. After consecutive singles to start the ninth inning, Martinez turned to veteran reliever Wander Suero, who had allowed a game-tying home run to Ortega the previous day. Both inherited runners came around to score, along with three more runs charged to Suero, and despite a two-run home run by third baseman Carter Kieboom in the bottom of the ninth, the Phillies won 7–5. A praying mantis that perched itself on Victor Robles' hat during the eight and ninth innings was made light of on Twitter by both fans and the Nationals' and Phillies' respective Twitter accounts.

The following day, having blown back-to-back saves, Suero was optioned to the Triple-A Rochester Red Wings, following Rainey as one of Martinez's former go-to high-leverage relievers to have fallen out of favor due to poor performance. The Nationals also placed backup catcher René Rivera on the injured list, recalling newly acquired catcher Riley Adams and selecting the contract of veteran right-hander Javy Guerra to replace Suero and Rivera on the roster. Washington starter Patrick Corbin pitched well for six innings, allowing just one run on a leadoff home run by Jean Segura, before giving up three more runs in the seventh inning. The Nationals were able to plate four runs against Phillies ace Zack Wheeler, who pitched into the eighth inning, but the difference in the game ended up being a solo home run by former National Bryce Harper off Guerra in the top of the eighth. Adams made his Nationals debut as a pinch-hitter, striking out to end the game in the ninth inning. Nationals second baseman Luis García Jr. homered twice on August 4, his first career multi-homer game, and Washington's youth movement was on display as center fielder Víctor Robles and the third baseman Kieboom went deep as well, but starting pitcher Paolo Espino struggled, the rest of the Nationals lineup did as well, and the Phillies won, 9–5. Harper again got the better of Guerra in a late-game situation, doubling in an insurance run off the right-hander in the eighth inning. The Phillies came from behind, overcoming a three-run home run by Nationals first baseman Josh Bell and a strong offensive performance by right fielder Juan Soto, on August 5, taking advantage of a wild throw by Kieboom at third base that extended the ninth inning and ultimately scoring four unearned runs off Nationals reliever Kyle Finnegan. A hit by Bell that kicked off the second base bag closed the deficit to a single run, but the Nationals could not level the game, and after scoring on the odd play, Soto reported pain in his left knee.

The Nationals lost their fifth straight game in the series opener on the road against the division-rival Atlanta Braves. Starting pitcher Erick Fedde labored, Guerra surrendered three runs in relief, and with Soto sitting out due to his tweaked knee, the Nationals' depleted lineup was held to five hits in an 8–4 loss on August 6. Fedde batted in a run for the first time in his career, lofting a sacrifice fly in the top of the fifth inning, but he was knocked out of the game in the bottom of the fifth as the Braves rallied to take a lead they would not relinquish. The visitors appeared to be headed for their sixth straight loss on August 7, as despite a strong five-inning start from top prospect Gray, who struck out ten Braves (Note: Prior to Gray's ten-strikeout performance, the most recent Nationals rookie to strike out double-digit batters in a game was Reynaldo López, also against the Atlanta Braves, on August 18, 2016. (See "Stat of the Day: Zim shows off endurance", MLB.com, August 8, 2021.)) and allowed just one earned run, and effective work from the Nationals' bullpen, Charlie Morton led the Atlanta pitching staff in throwing eight shutout innings. But Washington's fortunes changed in the top of the ninth inning, as Bell walked, veteran pinch-hitter Ryan Zimmerman doubled, and Bell scored on a García groundout to the right side of the infield to halve the deficit. The rookie catcher Adams then delivered his first hit as a National, a no-doubt two-run homer into the second deck in left field for his first career home run and RBIs. Finnegan closed out the Braves for his third save, and journeyman reliever Andrés Machado picked up his first career win after pitching a scoreless eighth inning. A late rally on August 8 in the rubber game was not enough for the Nationals, however. Corbin gave up five runs over six innings, and while the Nationals were able to chip away with RBI singles by Robles and Zimmerman off reliever Jesse Chavez in the seventh and an RBI double by Zimmerman off Chris Martin in the ninth, Bell—playing right field for the first time as a National—grounded out to strand the tying run on second and end the game.

The next series on the Nationals' schedule got off to an unusual start, as the Nationals started the first of a three-game series at the division-rival New York Mets on August 10 despite heavy storms covering much of Downstate New York. Back in the lineup for the first time since injuring his knee, Soto jacked a three-run home run off Mets starter Carlos Carrasco, then Espino gave up a run on two hits in the bottom of the first inning, before play was halted with no outs and Adams on first in the top of the second inning. Before the suspended game resumed, the Nationals optioned left-handed reliever Sam Clay and selected the contract of left-hander Sean Nolin, who had last appeared in a major league game late in the 2015 season. (Note: Nolin's most recent MLB appearance was on October 3, 2015, for the Oakland Athletics. That same day, Max Scherzer threw the most recent no-hitter for the Washington Nationals to date, also at Citi Field against the New York Mets. (See Simon, Andrew, "On the day Sean Nolin last pitched in the Major Leagues, Max Scherzer threw his 17-K no-hitter against the Mets," twitter.com, August 11, 2021.)) The Nationals blew two three-run leads in the continued game on August 11, as the Mets scored four runs off Ross, pitching in long relief, then chipped away with a run off Klobosits, then scored twice off Thompson—taking advantage of a throwing error by the rookie reliever—in the eighth inning before Edwin Díaz nailed down the save. The second game was rained out, prompting two seven-inning games to be scheduled August 12 to conclude the series. In the first game, Nolin gave up four runs, three of them on a second-inning home run by Brandon Nimmo, and was knocked out in the fourth inning. The Nationals scratched across just one run, off a tiring and dehydrated Marcus Stroman in the sixth inning, and lost 4–1. In the second game, Fedde labored to get through four innings and Rainey, summoned for the day from Triple-A Rochester as the Nationals' 27th man, gave up two insurance runs on a blast to straightaway center by Jonathan Villar in the bottom of the sixth. The Mets again led 4–1 in the seventh inning, but Trevor May struggled and the Mets went to Jeurys Familia, who uncorked a wild pitch with the bases loaded and two outs in the top of the seventh before giving up a seeing-eye single by left fielder Andrew Stevenson that tied the game. But Finnegan couldn't keep the score tied in the bottom of the seventh. Pete Alonso clubbed a solo home run just beyond the reach of the leaping Stevenson to give the Mets a walk-off win and sweep. Zimmerman started the game at first base, setting a new Montreal–Washington franchise record for games played. (Note: Appearing in his 1,768th game with the Nationals, Zimmerman eclipsed the previous record set by Tim Wallach for the Montreal Expos in 1992. (See "Mr. National", twitter.com, August 12, 2021.))

The Nationals returned home for a series against the Braves. The August 13 opener was delayed more than three hours by rain before beginning at 10:17 p.m. EDT. The Nationals struck early for two runs off Atlanta starter Morton in the first inning, notching three straight hits before Bell made the first out on a sacrifice fly. But Morton and the Braves' pitching staff buckled down, shutting out Washington the rest of the way despite several scoring opportunities. All four Braves runs in the game came on solo home runs, three of them off Gray, who suffered his first losing decision as a National. Before the second game of the series on August 14, the Nationals made a minor move, designating Rivera for assignment and acquiring reliever Patrick Murphy off waivers from the Toronto Blue Jays. Murphy was optioned to Triple-A Rochester, joining fellow 40-man roster relievers Rainey, Suero, and Clay and the rehabbing Kyle McGowin. On the field, the Braves once again punished Corbin, scoring six runs off him and knocking him out in the fifth inning, pushing his earned run average for the season over 6. They tacked on three more against Guerra and then Jefry Rodríguez in relief. Braves shortstop Dansby Swanson homered twice in the game, batting in six. Stymied by Atlanta's Max Fried, the Nationals mustered just two runs on RBI singles by Bell and Hernández. Between the second and third games of the series, the Nationals announced the results of an MRI on Ross' right arm, taken after his rocky relief appearance against the Mets: a partial tear of the 28-year-old's ulnar collateral ligament of the elbow, which had been replaced during the 2017 season. Ross was placed on the injured list before the August 15 game, and the Nationals recalled outfielder Lane Thomas, who had just been acquired from the St. Louis Cardinals the previous month. Thomas collected two hits in the game, which marked the Nationals' seventh straight loss, their longest losing streak of the season to date. After Espino gave up three early runs, the Nationals answered back to level the score in the third inning, but Atlanta tacked on three more in the fifth inning—their sixth run of the game coming on a bases-loaded wild pitch by the rookie Klobosits, who took over in relief after Espino gave up back-to-back home runs to lead off the inning. The Nationals scored twice more but couldn't convert other scoring opportunities. They fell 6–5, as Braves third baseman Austin Riley robbed his counterpart Kieboom on a sharp grounder to end the game, stranding two runners on base.

The Nationals snapped their losing streak with a two-game sweep of the visiting Blue Jays. Adams, traded the previous month from the Blue Jays, had three hits in a 12–6 win on August 17. Fedde pitched well through the first four innings, allowing just one run, but gave up another pair of runs in the fifth inning. The Nationals drubbed Toronto rookie starter Alek Manoah, scoring seven runs off him over three innings of work. On August 18, Gray turned in another strong start, giving up two runs—both on solo homers—over six innings while using his slider to great effect. Gray was backed by three-run homers by Soto and Bell, contributing to an 8–5 win. The Nationals rallied after a meltdown by reliever Ryne Harper in the top of the seventh that briefly gave the visitors the lead, as Bell and Kieboom hammered home runs off former Nationals closer Brad Hand, who was the Blue Jays' return in the Adams trade, saddling him with the blown save and loss.

The winning streak ran to three games as the Nationals claimed the first in a three-game series visiting the Milwaukee Brewers on August 20. Corbin turned in his best start since mid-June, pitching into the seventh inning while only allowing one run, a seventh-inning solo home run by Avisaíl García. Thomas powered the Nationals' offense, tripling in a pair of runs in the fourth inning off Brewers starter Brett Anderson. Adams and Bell also provided RBIs. But the Brewers swung the bats well on August 21, snapping the Nationals' winning streak. They knocked out Espino in the fifth inning, scoring three runs against him. The third and final run charged to Espino scored when Omar Narváez popped up a pitch from Klobosits, who came on in relief in the fifth, which was caught in foul ground by the first baseman Zimmerman, and Kolten Wong scored from third after no one covered home plate on the play. Thomas turned in another strong offensive performance while also throwing out a runner, Luis Urías, at second base in the sixth inning, and Hernández homered to tie the game after Espino and Klobosits combined to blow the Nationals' early three-run lead. Guerra came in to protect a tied game in the eighth inning, but he loaded the bases, then hit Wong with a pitch to force in the go-ahead run, then gave up a grand slam to Christian Yelich—part of a two-homer game for the former National League Most Valuable Player—to blow the game wide open. The Nationals scored twice in the ninth inning but lost, 9–6. The following day, Guerra was designated for assignment, and the Nationals activated relievers Kyle McGowin and Austin Voth from the injured list, reinforcing a shaky bullpen. Stevenson was optioned to Triple-A Rochester in a corresponding move. The Nationals also tapped longtime minor league utility player Brandon Snyder to take over from Brett Austin as bullpen catcher, after Austin took a coaching job at North Carolina State University and regular bullpen coach Henry Blanco took on bench coaching duties for Tim Bogar, who underwent back surgery. In the rubber game, Nolin, tabbed for his second start for the Nationals, couldn't overcome Wong. The Brewers' second baseman drove in three runs against Nolin, homering and tripling, and Milwaukee tacked on in the sixth and seventh innings, as Klobosits wobbled through an inning in which he gave up two runs without allowing a hit—both scoring on a routine grounder to first base that Bell threw over the catcher Adams' head as he attempted to turn a 3-2 double play—and Rodríguez gave up a mammoth two-run homer to left by Lorenzo Cain. The Brewers walked 11 times in the contest. Thomas again reached base four times and enabled Adams to score on a stolen base when catcher Manny Piña's throw deflected off Thomas' batting helmet at second base. Kieboom homered in the ninth inning off reliever Hoby Milner, and back-to-back hits by Thomas and shortstop Alcides Escobar forced Brewers manager Craig Counsell to insert his closer, Josh Hader. But Hader induced a game-ending groundout by Soto to seal the 7–3 win for Milwaukee.

On August 23, the Nationals made another acquisition off the waiver wire, adding first baseman Mike Ford from the Tampa Bay Rays and optioning him to Triple-A Rochester. Ross was transferred to the 60-day injured list, officially ending his season, to make room for Ford on the 40-man roster. Rodríguez was also designated for assignment and Klobosits optioned back to Rochester the following day, with Clay and Murphy recalled to take their spots in the bullpen. In the August 24 game visiting the division-rival Miami Marlins, Fedde led the Nationals to a convincing 5–1 win with a career-high ten strikeouts. The Nationals hammered Marlins starter (and Nationals 2016 third-round draft pick) Jesús Luzardo, scoring all five of their runs off him, including a two-run homer by catcher Tres Barrera. Miami won the next two games in the three-game series, however. In a marquee matchup between two top pitching prospects, the Marlins could only scratch across a pair of runs against Gray on August 25 over six strong innings of work, but their own starter, Edward Cabrera, cracked in his seventh inning of work in his major league debut after six shutout innings. Bell and Hernández hit back-to-back home runs to score three quick runs and chase Cabrera from the game. However, Machado couldn't hold Gray's lead, giving up a leadoff triple and then an RBI single in the next frame. The game headed to extra innings. In the top of the tenth, Adams singled and the automatic runner Kieboom attempted to score from second base, but Marlins right fielder Jesús Sánchez cut Kieboom down with a strong throw to the plate. With his closer Finnegan on the mound in the bottom of the tenth to try to preserve the tie, Martinez intentionally loaded the bases with one out, but Jorge Alfaro rifled a single to left to walk off the visiting Nationals. The Marlins sacked Corbin in the August 26 rubber game, scoring six times off him over four innings, with four of those runs coming in the left-hander's first inning of work. The Nationals fought back, scoring their first two runs on a Soto home run to right-center in the fifth off Elieser Hernández and ultimately bringing the go-ahead run to the plate in the ninth inning, as Adams pinch-hit for García against Miami reliever Dylan Floro. Adams flew out to stifle a two-run rally and end the game. Murphy made his Nationals debut in the game, pitching a scoreless inning of relief.

The Nationals repeated the pattern in three games visiting the Mets: They won the first game on August 27, with Espino also setting a new career high in strikeouts with seven as he outdueled veteran Rich Hill, then dropped the series by losing August 28 and August 29. Nolin turned in his best start to date as a National in the former game, giving up two runs before departing in the sixth inning, but Harper and Thompson combined to give up three runs in the seventh inning—on a deep home run by pinch-hitter Michael Conforto, immediately after Thompson came on in relief of Harper—that ended up being the difference. The Mets hammered Fedde in the rubber game, scoring five runs off him—the first coming after Francisco Lindor danced off third base, feinting toward home, with two outs in the first inning, prompting Fedde to balk. The Nationals tallied just three hits in the game, all of them home runs: two by Bell, one by Soto. The game was overshadowed by controversy in New York, as Lindor and teammates Javy Báez, who also homered in the contest, and Kevin Pillar flashed "thumbs-down" signs after reaching base, which Báez explained after the game was a signal of disapproval for home fans who booed players' performance. "When we don't get success, we're going to get booed," Báez explained to reporters. "So they're going to get booed when we have success." Mets team president Sandy Alderson criticized Báez's remarks, calling them "totally unacceptable" and the thumbs-down sign "unprofessional". For the Nationals, another piece of team news outshone the series loss as well. Martinez announced August 29 that the Nationals would call up top prospect Keibert Ruiz to catch Gray, his former teammate in the Los Angeles Dodgers organization before both were included in July's blockbuster trade of Max Scherzer and Trea Turner to the Dodgers. Barrera was optioned in a corresponding move after the August 29 game.

As expected, ahead of their August 30 home game versus the Phillies, the Nationals recalled Ruiz from Triple-A Rochester. Ruiz went 1-for-4 in his first game with the Nationals, a 7–4 loss. Gray was hit hard, giving up a two-run homer to the Phillies' Harper in the first inning and four more runs before exiting after the fourth inning, and took his first loss as a Nationals pitcher. Three of those runs scored on a flyball to left off the bat of Ronald Torreyes that Hernández misplayed, which turned into a bases-clearing triple. The Nationals brought the tying run to the plate with nobody out against Philadelphia closer José Alvarado in the ninth inning, but Adams struck out, Soto grounded into a fielder's choice, and Bell struck out swinging at a pitch well outside the strikezone to end the game. The following day, the Nationals made a flurry of roster moves, placing their closer Finnegan on the paternity list and recalling Suero from Triple-A Rochester, as well as optioning Robles to Rochester, sending him to the minor leagues for the first time since the 2018 season, and recalling Stevenson. Despite taking a three-run lead through the first five innings, the Nationals were blown out on August 31, losing 12–6, as Corbin and Machado combined to give up six runs in the sixth inning and Suero gave up three more in the ninth inning. Kieboom homered for the second straight game in the loss.

The Nationals finished August having gone 7–20 over the course of the month, their worst record over the course of a full month since April 2009. They fell 15 games behind the first-place Braves in the National League East Division, with a 55–76 record on the season that put them just one game ahead of the Marlins for fourth place in the division.

=== September ===
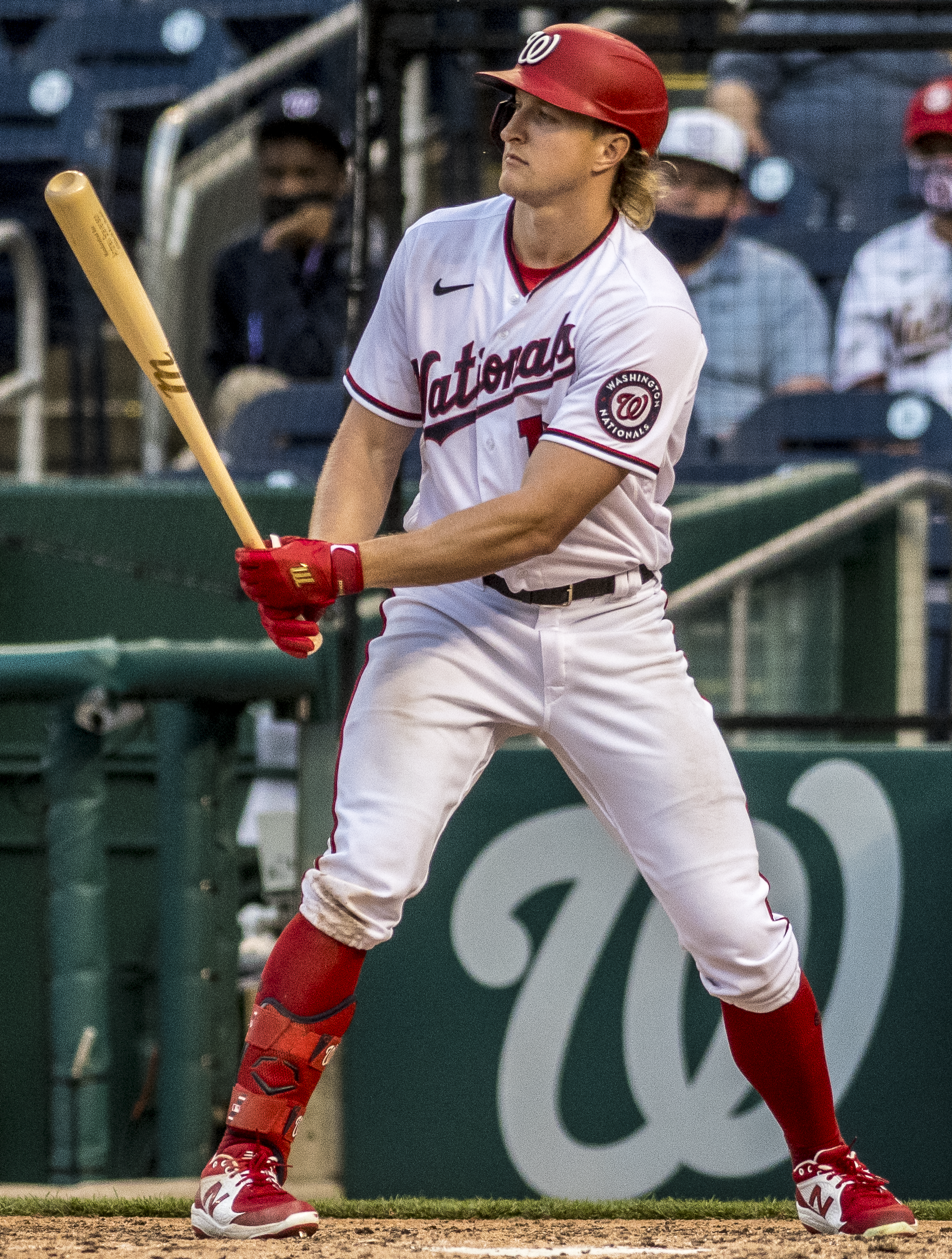
Heroics by outfielder Andrew Stevenson repeatedly kept the Nationals in the fight during a five-game series against the division-rival New York Mets.

Rained out for their scheduled series finale against the division-rival Philadelphia Phillies due to the remnants of Hurricane Ida sweeping through the Northeast, the Nationals did not play September 1. With rosters expanding to 28 players, the Nationals activated veteran catcher Alex Avila from the injured list after nearly two months out of action, and they also selected the contract of 28-year-old journeyman left-handed reliever Alberto Baldonado from their Triple-A affiliate, the Rochester Red Wings. The Nationals also became the first Major League Baseball organization to fire employees for not getting vaccinated against COVID-19, which the team declared to be a condition of employment. They dismissed eight scouts, at least two for failure to present proof of vaccination. Bob Boone, Washington's vice president of player development, told The Washington Post he would resign rather than be vaccinated.

The Nationals concluded their series hosting the Phillies by losing 7–6, with the visitors coming back from a six-run deficit to complete the sweep. Nationals starter Paolo Espino outdueled the Phillies' Aaron Nola, who gave up home runs to Washington center fielder Lane Thomas and right fielder Juan Soto, but he ran into trouble in the top of the sixth inning after five shutout innings. Rookie reliever Mason Thompson was unable to get an out, with Philadelphia left fielder Andrew McCutchen halving the lead with a bases-clearing double. After a scoreless seventh inning by Baldonado in his major league debut, rookies Patrick Murphy and Andrés Machado combined to give up four runs in the eighth inning, victimized twice by poor fielding on the part of second baseman Luis García Jr. on two potential double play balls. After first baseman Josh Bell doubled to put the tying run on base in the bottom of the ninth, rookie catcher Keibert Ruiz barreled up a pitch from Phillies closer Ian Kennedy but flew out just in front of the warning track in deep center field to end the game. The Nationals also released third baseman Starlin Castro, after he finished serving a 30-game suspension under MLB's domestic violence and child abuse policy.

Two games to begin a five-game series against the visiting New York Mets followed much the same script: The Nationals fell behind early, only to rally their way back to tie the game in the final inning of regulation play before losing in extra innings. On September 3, the Nationals entered the ninth inning looking to avoid being shut out while trailing by a pair of runs, with starter Sean Nolin on the hook for the loss. Soto opened the bottom of the ninth with a solo homer just inside the left field foul pole off Mets closer Edwin Díaz, then catcher Riley Adams doubled in pinch-runner Andrew Stevenson, who collided with Mets catcher Chance Sisco several feet from home plate and tumbled in before touching the plate to score. But reliever Austin Voth melted down in the top of the tenth inning, allowing the unearned automatic runner to score from second base along with three more earned runs, and Jeurys Familia retired the Nationals in the bottom of the tenth. In the first game of a doubleheader scheduled September 4 to make up a postponement from the scheduled opening series of the season, the Mets pounced on starter Erick Fedde, scoring seven runs to chase him after three innings, then plated another pair of runs against reliever Wander Suero. The Nationals rallied from the nine-run deficit, as Ryne Harper and Baldonado put up three scoreless innings in relief, the Nationals took advantage of some defensive miscues to close the deficit to two runs in the bottom of the sixth, and Stevenson hit a two-run homer off Seth Lugo with two out in the bottom of the seventh to tie the game. (Note: The comeback from being down 9–0 early against the Mets tied a team record previously set against the Miami Marlins on July 5, 2018, for the largest deficit erased by the Nationals in a game. That game ended as a 14–12 win for Washington. (See Jageler, Dave, "The Nats nearly completed a record tying comeback in game 1", Twitter, September 5, 2021.)) Baldonado's scoreless eighth inning put the Nationals in a position to walk off in the bottom of the eighth, under the seven-inning doubleheader rule in effect for the season, but pinch-hitter Gerardo Parra struck out with the bases loaded and Ruiz flew out. In his return from the paternity list, Kyle Finnegan gave up a two-run homer facing Francisco Lindor in the top of the ninth inning, and the Mets held on to win the game. To start the second game of the doubleheader, the Nationals selected the contract of left-handed pitcher Josh Rogers from the Red Wings, placing reliever Kyle McGowin on the 60-day injured list—and thereby ending his season—after he was diagnosed with a sprained right ulnar collateral ligament of the elbow. Pitching in the major leagues for the first time since the 2019 season, Rogers gave up a run, on a single by Michael Conforto, before he could record an out in the top of the first inning, but he settled down and held the Mets hitless after that through five innings. In the sixth inning, after Rogers landed awkwardly after throwing a pitch and was checked out by the Nationals' training staff, the Washington spot starter gave up a two-run homer by Kevin Pillar. Those three runs off Rogers, who was replaced after retiring one more batter in the sixth inning, accounted for New York's scoring total in the nightcap. Meanwhile, the Nationals answered back with a leadoff homer by Thomas and an RBI single by third baseman Carter Kieboom in the first inning, then a two-run homer by Alcides Escobar in the fifth inning, all against Mets starter Tylor Megill. Finnegan returned to the mound to record the seventh-inning save, striking out Mets first baseman Pete Alonso to snap the Nationals' seven-game losing streak. Rogers earned the win, his first as a National. (Note: Rogers broke a string of eighteen consecutive pitchers to debut with the Nationals as a starter and end with a loss or no decision. The most recent National to make his debut with the team as a starter and earn a win in his debut game was Ross Ohlendorf against the Colorado Rockies on June 12, 2013. (See Jageler, Dave, "Game 136 Notes", twitter.com, September 5, 2021.)) On September 5, the Nationals placed Parra on the injured list with inflammation in his surgically repaired right knee, keeping Rogers on the active roster after he played as the "extra man" under doubleheader rules the previous day. Rookie Josiah Gray, tabbed with the start for Washington, struggled through three innings of work, giving up six runs. Murphy and Thompson combined for four scoreless innings of relief, and the Nationals battled back against Mets starter Taijuan Walker, with Thomas hitting another leadoff home run and Bell following with a two-run homer in the first inning before adding three more runs in the fifth inning. Walker exited in the fifth, having given up six runs of his own. The Mets took the lead in the eighth inning on a sacrifice fly by Patrick Mazeika off Machado, and while Baldonado was able to stifle the scoring threat in the eighth, Voth again imploded when asked to keep the game close in the top of the ninth, surrendering six runs without recording an out. The Nationals lost, 13–6. The Nationals rallied yet again, this time coming away with the win, in a September 6 day game that marked the series finale against the Mets. Starter Patrick Corbin wobbled his way through seven innings, allowing eleven hits and a walk but limiting the damage to three runs, leaving him in line for the loss. However, Finnegan stopped New York in its tracks with two scoreless relief innings, before Stevenson once again delivered a game-tying RBI in the ninth inning, facing Díaz as a pinch-hitter and singling home Escobar from second base with a line drive into right field. The next batter, Kieboom, chopped a grounder toward shortstop that Lindor couldn't glove, bringing in Bell as the game-winner and dropping the Mets back to .500.

The Nationals next headed to Cobb County, Georgia, where they dropped two of three hard-fought games against the division-rival Atlanta Braves. On September 7, the Braves greeted Espino with a three-run homer by Adam Duvall in the first inning, then tacked on two more runs in the fourth inning. While Max Fried only gave up one run over six innings, the Nationals battled back against reliever Tyler Matzek in the seventh, with Soto lining an RBI single to cut the deficit to three runs before left fielder Yadiel Hernández mashed a three-run home run into the left field stands to even the score. The Braves quickly answered with a two-run Ozzie Albies homer to left against the struggling Harper in the bottom of the inning, and Albies added another RBI against Sam Clay in the eighth. Before inducing a game-ending double play from Bell, Braves closer Will Smith hit Soto—who had homered off him in an August 2020 game after Smith upbraided him for watching his warm-up pitches from behind home plate, then later hit a walk-off single against him on Opening Day 2021—in the ribs with a fastball. The next day, Nationals starter Nolin responded by throwing behind reigning National League Most Valuable Player Freddie Freeman's back, then hitting him in the buttocks with a 91 miles per hour (146 km/h) fastball. Nolin was ejected from the game after the umpiring crew convened and determined there was intent behind Nolin's pitch, although Nolin denied intentionally trying to hit Freeman after the game. Soto met Freeman at second base after the inning was over, and the players put their arms around each other before Freeman went over to the visitors' bullpen to speak and exchange fist bumps with Nationals manager Dave Martinez. Martinez said after the game that he told Freeman he never tells his pitchers to try to hit batters, and Freeman told reporters that while he believed Nolin threw at him intentionally, he told Soto that Smith did not intend to hit him the previous night and that there were no hard feelings on his part. Despite losing their starter after just a third of an inning, the Nationals won the game, with Murphy taking over from Nolin, collecting eight outs without allowing a hit, and leading the bullpen in only giving up two runs over the course of the game. Soto hit a solo home run 462 feet (141 m) out to right-center field off Richard Rodríguez in the seventh inning, putting the Nationals on top with the eventual game-winning run. The rubber game on September 9 was a seesaw affair, with the Braves scoring four runs off Fedde—including two homers by veteran catcher Stephen Vogt, who later left the game with an apparent injury after a wild pitch—but the Nationals battling against Huascar Ynoa and a succession of relievers, first evening the score off A. J. Minter and Jesse Chavez at 3–3 in the sixth; then at 4–4 in the seventh against Luke Jackson; briefly taking the lead in the eighth when Rodríguez gave up another long home run, this one a blast to straightaway center by García; then sticking Smith with a blown save in the ninth inning, after Thompson gave up back-to-back home runs to Freeman and Duvall, when Albies fired a wide throw to first in an attempt to double up Bell, allowing Bell to cruise into second base as Thomas scored from third. The Braves won in extra innings on a walk-off tenth-inning single by Joc Pederson, off Suero, with the bases loaded. The following day, the Commissioner's Office meted out a five-game suspension for Nolin and a one-game suspension for Martinez over the Freeman incident.

Washington dropped two of three visiting the Pittsburgh Pirates, one of just two teams in the National League to boast a worse record to that point in the season than the Nationals. After multiple come-from-behind rallies against the Mets and Braves, on September 10, it was the Nationals' turn to blow a late lead. While Rogers, tasked with his second start as a National, pitched into the seventh inning and allowed a pair of runs, and the Nationals scored twice off starter Steven Brault plus a solo home run by Bell, a former Pirate, in the sixth against reliever Sam Howard, acting manager Tim Bogar elected not to insert Finnegan in the ninth inning, instead turning to the rookie Murphy for the save. Murphy struggled, giving up a leadoff single and a walk while uncorking two wild pitches. Bogar sent Baldonado to the mound with runners on second and third and one out, but Colin Moran grounded out to tie the game and then Ke'Bryan Hayes roped a base hit down the right field line to walk the Nationals off. The next night, playing in front of first responders and family members of United Airlines Flight 93 crash victims in honor of the 20th anniversary of the September 11, 2001, terror attacks that claimed lives in both Western Pennsylvania and the National Capital Region, the Pirates again rebounded from a deficit. The Nationals' struggling top prospect Gray gave up five runs, the last three on homers by Bryan Reynolds and Ben Gamel to tie the game in the bottom of the fifth. Washington faced one of its former prospects, Wil Crowe, who started for Pittsburgh and pitched four innings, giving up all three of his runs allowed on a bases-clearing double by Ruiz. Ruiz later exited the game after a stray pitch from reliever Kyle Keller hit him in the side of the head in the top of the sixth inning. In the bottom of the sixth, the Pirates scored four times to take the lead, walking four times against an ineffectual tag-team of Baldonado and Machado to go ahead, then adding on with an infield single and a two-run error by García. Despite a pinch-hit home run from longest-tenured National Ryan Zimmerman in the eighth, the Nationals failed to rally, losing their third straight game. The Nationals succeeded in flipping the script on September 12, salvaging the series behind seven innings of two-run ball from Corbin and home runs by García, Thomas, and Avila—the latter's first as a National. Thompson and Finnegan shut down the Pirates the rest of the way to secure the win.

On September 13, the Nationals activated infielder Jordy Mercer from the injured list after nearly two months, designating utilityman Adrián Sánchez for assignment in a corresponding move. After a powerful showing the previous game in Pittsburgh, the Nationals' bats went silent as they hosted the division-rival Miami Marlins on September 13. Marlins ace Sandy Alcántara pitched very well despite being struck in the leg by a Soto comebacker in the bottom of the fourth, taking a perfect game into the sixth inning, until it was broken up by Ruiz's sharp grounder to second baseman Jazz Chisholm Jr., which was ruled an error; and a no-hitter into the seventh inning, before Bell blasted a long two-out single off the right field wall; while leading the Marlins to a 3–0 shutout. Espino took a hard-luck loss despite giving up just one run over six strong innings. The Nationals rebounded to roll over the Marlins on September 14, winning 8–2 behind a strong start from Fedde, battering Marlins starter and former Nationals prospect Jesús Luzardo for four runs and knocking him out in the fifth inning before blowing the game open against reliever Sean Guenther in the eighth. The Marlins' only two runs were scored by rookie first baseman Lewin Díaz, who homered twice. Zimmerman crushed a homer off Luzardo out to left field that traveled an estimated 442 feet (135 m), the veteran's longest home run since the 2018 season. (Note: Zimmerman's home run was also the longest hit to the opposite field by a Nationals batter recorded in the Statcast era, or since at least the 2015 season. (See Dougherty, Jesse, "Ryan Zimmerman's opposite-field blast helps power Nats past Marlins", The Washington Post, September 14, 2021.)) The Nationals enjoyed five innings of one-hit, shutout ball from Rogers to start the rubber game on September 15. While Rogers exited with a two-run lead, the bullpen almost immediately gave it up, as Jesús Sánchez homered into the visitors' bullpen following a four-pitch walk by Baldonado in the sixth. The two teams traded runs over the next few innings. The Nationals retook the lead on a Soto sacrifice fly off Anthony Bass in the bottom of the sixth, lost it again on Miguel Rojas' RBI infield single off Thompson in the top of the seventh, and retook it on a bases-loaded walk by Thomas and RBI single by Escobar against Richard Bleier in the bottom of the seventh. Solo homers by Bell and Bryan De La Cruz in the eighth effectively canceled each other out, and the Nationals entered the ninth inning up by two. Rojas singled to bring Miami within a run, then De La Cruz drove in Chisholm with a groundout to shortstop to tie the game. Sánchez then hit his second home run of the game to put the Marlins on top. Marlins closer Dylan Floro retired the side in order to lock down the save and pin another series loss on the Nationals—their tenth straight against the National League East. Also on September 15, the Nationals dismissed pitching coordinator Brad Holman, Boone, and other staff members who refused to get vaccinated against COVID-19. Holman and fired minor league pitching coach Larry Pardo threatened a lawsuit against the Nationals, alleging religious discrimination.

The Nationals lost their next series against the Colorado Rockies. The September 17 game at Nationals Park aped their loss in the previous game, with the two teams trading blows in the mid- to late innings. The Nationals chased Colorado starter Germán Márquez after four innings, scoring six runs off him—three on a long home run into the Red Porch by Thomas—but despite marshaling just three hits against Gray, the Rockies scratched across five runs against the Nationals' rookie starter before taking the lead with a Sam Hilliard two-run homer off Baldonado, who relieved Gray in the sixth inning. After Escobar tied the game with a cue shot into right field in the bottom of the eighth, Bell beat out a potential double play ball to bring home Thomas and put the Nationals back on top. But Finnegan, tasked again with getting the save in the ninth inning, immediately served up a home run down the left field line by Elías Díaz. Brendan Rodgers dunked a soft single into shallow left field to score Hilliard for the go-ahead run a few batters later, and the Nationals failed to equalize in the bottom of the ninth, losing 9–8. With the loss, the Nationals were officially eliminated from postseason contention. On September 18, the Rockies blanked the Nationals 6–0. The visitors pummeled Corbin, scoring three runs off him in the first inning before blowing the game open with a Trevor Story three-run homer in the fourth inning. (Note: Exiting after four innings, Corbin became the first Nationals pitcher in team history to post, in a single season, six games with six or more runs allowed and fewer than five innings pitched. (See Zuckerman, Mark, "Nats can't overcome another dud from Corbin", MASN, September 18, 2021.)) While Harper and Nolin combined to shut out the Rockies the rest of the way, the Nationals were unable to score against Kyle Freeland and the Rockies' bullpen, grounding into four double plays to quash multiple scoring opportunities. Although he did not appear in the loss, reliever Tanner Rainey was recalled to join the Washington bullpen before the September 18 game, with Suero optioned back to Triple-A Rochester in a corresponding move. Rainey contributed a scoreless inning, striking out the side in the seventh inning, as the Nationals returned the favor by shutting out the Rockies 3–0 on September 19. Espino led the charge, pitching into the sixth inning without allowing a run. Jon Gray lost, giving up an RBI single by Hernández in the first inning and then a 454 foot (138 m) Soto homer to nearly straightaway center field in the third. García also singled in a run against Lucas Gilbreath in the sixth to cap the scoring. Finnegan picked up his tenth save after back-to-back blown save opportunities.

In their third matchup in two months, Fedde again outdueled Luzardo as the Marlins hosted the Nationals for a series starting September 20. But Fedde was bedeviled by the longball, giving up two long homers to Chisholm and one more to Sánchez. Lewis Brinson nearly homered to left, but Bell, playing left field, leaped to snare the ball before it landed on the other side of the outfield wall. Despite scoring five runs off Luzardo over four innings, plus two more against the Marlins' bullpen, the Nationals fell in extra innings, 8–7. Murphy and Voth combined to give up the lead in the seventh inning, with the tying run scoring on a Brinson grounder that deflected off Escobar's glove for an error, one of two charged to the shortstop in the contest. Rainey struck out the side again in the ninth inning, and with García on second base to start the top of the tenth as the automatic baserunner, Thomas hit a leadoff double on which García failed to score, having misread the opposite-field flyball and tagged up too late to go all the way home. After Escobar grounded out and Soto walked to load the bases, Bell hit a groundball to the first baseman Díaz, who threw home to force out García, then was unable to receive catcher Nick Fortes' return throw as it hit Bell in the back. Bell was called out for a double play for running inside the baseline, leaving the Nationals livid and prompting Martinez to be ejected for berating the umpiring crew. In the bottom of the tenth, with Clay facing Brinson and nobody out, the automatic runner Chisholm stole third base before scampering home on a spiked curveball that barely missed Brinson's foot before deflecting away from Ruiz for a wild pitch. An irate Martinez, who was ejected from Game 6 of the 2019 World Series, as well as from the game versus the Chicago Cubs on May 19, 2021, for arguing similar calls against Trea Turner, told reporters in his postgame press conference that the interference call against Bell that led to the double play was "brutal", suggesting that the umpires "use [their] freaking common sense one time" and not "reward" off-target throws by the catcher. He singled out crew chief Bill Miller for twice refusing the Nationals' attempts to challenge calls on the field—namely whether Fortes' throw to first was legitimately obstructed and whether Clay's walk-off wild pitch hit Brinson—in the tenth inning. "Go home," Martinez said, addressing Miller in his comments. "If you don't want to be on the field and do your job, go home." The Nationals also dismissed baserunning and outfield coordinator Gary Thurman, along with three minor league coaches, the next day. The Nationals bounced back on September 21 to win behind 7 2/3 innings of one-run ball from Josh Rogers, who outdueled the Marlins' Trevor Rogers while also making a spectacular shovel-flip to Bell at first base in the sixth inning to retire Chisholm on a softly hit groundball. The Nationals waited out Trevor Rogers, who struck out ten before unraveling in the sixth and giving up four runs. Escobar and Soto drove in three to break the game open against Taylor Williams in the ninth inning. In the September 22 rubber game, Gray pitched through six innings, giving up a pair of runs, to earn his first career win. The Nationals backed him with three home runs off Miami starter Elieser Hernández, one of them by a red-hot Soto, who reached base in all five plate appearances and came a triple short of the cycle. After Harper was ineffectual to start the ninth inning, giving up three runs to narrow the score to 7–5, Rainey entered and retired both batters he faced for his second save of the season. The series win was the Nationals' first of the month and snapped a streak of ten consecutive series losses against Washington's NL East division rivals.

Yadiel Hernández left the team to be with his wife for the birth of their second child before the Nationals visited the Cincinnati Reds beginning September 23. To replace Hernández on the roster, the Nationals selected the contract of right-handed relief prospect Jhon Romero from Triple-A Rochester. Catcher Jakson Reetz, who had spent most of the past two months with the Double-A Harrisburg Senators, was designated for assignment in order to clear a spot on the 40-man roster for Romero. Corbin pitched into the seventh inning without allowing a run, and the Nationals beat the Reds in the series opener, 3–2. Both runs were given up by Finnegan, who struggled once again in the closer's role. Soto homered twice, once off Reds starter Luis Castillo and then again off reliever Luis Cessa. He also worked a walk in the first inning to set a new team record for walks in a season. (Note: The previous record of 130 walks was set by Bryce Harper in the 2018 season. (See Wallner, Jeff, "Soto homers twice, sets Nats' walks record", MLB.com., September 23, 2021.)) Soto walked more four times in the next game on September 24, although Amir Garrett struck him out in the fifth inning to snap his streak of consecutive plate appearances reached at twelve. (Note: The most recent MLB player to reach base in twelve consecutive plate appearances was Freddie Freeman of the Atlanta Braves, from April 17–19, 2017, against the San Diego Padres and the Nationals. (See Baer, Bill, "Freddie Freeman has reached base in 12 consecutive plate appearances", NBC Sports, April 19, 2017, and Dougherty, Jesse, "Last player to reach base in 12 consecutive plate appearances was Freddie Freeman in 2017", twitter.com, September 24, 2021.)) Ruiz also hit his first Nationals home run, while Escobar also homered. The Nationals jumped out to a four-run lead against Reds starter Sonny Gray, but their starter Espino and a procession of relievers combined to give up seven unanswered runs. Thomas and Escobar doubled in the ninth against Mychal Givens, then with the bases loaded and the Nationals down to their last out, García smacked a two-run single to tie the game. Neither team was able to drive in the unearned automatic baserunner in the tenth inning, and after the Nationals again came up short in the top of the eleventh, Aristides Aquino led off the bottom of the eleventh with a hard grounder off Thompson, which kicked off the second baseman García's glove for a walk-off single. Romero made his major league debut in the contest, pitching a perfect bottom of the eighth. With Hernández returning from the paternity list the next day, the Nationals elected to keep Romero on the active roster, instead optioning Clay to Rochester to clear a roster spot for Hernández. A back-and-forth game on September 25 tipped the Reds' way, as both Cincinnati starter Vladimir Gutiérrez and Washington's starter Fedde struggled. Ruiz homered for the second straight night to briefly put the Nationals on top in the seventh inning, but Machado gave up a game-tying double to Kyle Farmer that knotted the score at six runs apiece. After pitching a scoreless eighth inning, Murphy came back out for the ninth to try to force extra innings, but Nick Castellanos blasted a home run to straightaway center for another Reds walk-off win. The Reds won their third straight over the Nationals to cap the four-game series on September 26. While Rogers put up four scoreless innings in front of a large cheering section of friends and family from neighboring Indiana, his home state, the Reds broke through with back-to-back home runs by Tyler Stephenson and Castellanos in the fifth inning, ultimately chasing Rogers from the game. Farmer busted the game open against Harper in the seventh, launching a hanging curveball into the second deck in left field for a no-doubt grand slam. (Note: Farmer's grand slam off Harper was the 14th and final of the Nationals' season, tying a major league record for most grand slams allowed in a season. The record was originally set by the Detroit Tigers in 1996. (See Zuckerman, Mark, "Another short start, another grand slam in Nats loss (updated)", Mid-Atlantic Sports Network, September 26, 2021.)) The Nationals scratched across two runs in the game, both of them on Reds misplays: an error by second baseman Jonathan India on a Thomas groundball in the fifth inning and a wild pitch by reliever Jeff Hoffman in the ninth.

The Nationals dropped two of three visiting the Rockies in their final away games of the 2021 season. They eked out a 5–4 win on September 27, Gray's second career win, as the rookie pitched into the sixth inning before Colorado could do any damage against him. Gray hit Rodgers in the head with a pitch in the first inning, although the Rockies infielder's helmet prevented serious injury. While Gray settled in after that, in the sixth inning, his command faltered again. With the bases loaded, Ryan McMahon gashed a bases-clearing double that accounted for all three runs Gray gave up. But the Nationals had already scored four times off Márquez to that point, and their bullpen was able to hold the home team down until the ninth inning, when C. J. Cron doubled off Rainey to score the Rockies' fourth run. Fortunately for the visitors, Escobar had singled in an insurance run in the top of the ninth, and Rainey retired McMahon for the save. Corbin turned in another effective start on September 28, continuing his September resurgence as he pitched six innings with two runs allowed, on an RBI double by McMahon and a 475 foot (145 m) home run by Story. (Note: Story's home run was the 37th and final of the season surrendered by Corbin, setting a new Montreal–Washington franchise record for home runs allowed in a season. The record of 31 home runs allowed was previously set by Javier Vázquez for the Montreal Expos in 1998 and tied by Ramón Ortiz for the Nationals in 2006 and by Max Scherzer for the Nationals in 2016. (See Motley, King, "Patrick Corbin Won't Pitch Again This Season", DC Sports King, September 29, 2021, and Weyrich, Matt, "Patrick Corbin sets Nationals record for most home runs allowed in a season", WTOP, August 31, 2021.)) But Rockies starting pitcher Freeland was better. Corbin took the loss as the Nationals were only able to get one run in, with the previously red-hot Soto failing to reach safely and snapping a fourteen-game on-base streak. A rain-delayed rubber game swung the Rockies' way on September 29. Espino was clobbered for four runs before exiting after two innings and a lengthy delay. While the Nationals piled on five runs of their own, three against Colorado starter Peter Lambert, over the first three innings to take the lead back, the Rockies' bullpen shut them down the rest of the way while scoring six more times. The Rockies won, 10–5, closing out the Nationals' slate of September games.

Overall, in September, the Nationals went 10–18 while winning just one series. They finished the month with a 65–94 record, placing them last in the National League East Division.

=== October ===
Three games were scheduled for the Nationals in October, hosting the American League's Boston Red Sox at Nationals Park with the Sox battling for a playoff spot. Boston took the first game of the series on October 1, holding the Nationals to two runs—on solo homers by veteran infielders Alcides Escobar and Jordy Mercer—while waiting out Nationals starter Josh Rogers, who held the visitors scoreless for five innings before giving up four runs on back-to-back homers by Hunter Renfroe and Bobby Dalbec in the sixth. With Rogers' season done, the Nationals placed him on the injured list with a strained hamstring the next day to free up a roster spot for veteran outfielder Gerardo Parra, activated after close to a month on the injured list with right knee inflammation. On October 2, rookie Josiah Gray pitched well in his last start of the season, giving Washington six innings while striking out seven and allowing just one run, on a solo home run by Rafael Devers. The Nationals tied the game in the eighth inning when right fielder Juan Soto ripped a pitch from Red Sox reliever Austin Davis to deep center field, just missing a grand slam but settling for a sacrifice fly. But right-handers Tanner Rainey and Mason Thompson combined to give back that run plus three more in the ninth inning, all with two outs. While the Nationals were able to claw back two runs when catcher Keibert Ruiz walked and left fielder Andrew Stevenson homered to lead off the bottom of the ninth, they went quietly from there. To start their final game of the season on October 3, the Nationals called up 23-year-old pitching prospect Joan Adon from the Triple-A Rochester Red Wings to make his major league debut. (Note: With his appearance on October 3, Adon became the first pitcher since Jonathan Johnson of the Texas Rangers on September 27, 1998, to make his major league debut by starting Game 162 of the regular season. (See "Game 162 – Boston Red Sox @ Washington Nationals", Mid-Atlantic Sports Network broadcast, October 3, 2021.)) Infielder Luis García Jr., who had not appeared in the series yet after sitting out the first two games, was placed on the injured list with an oblique strain in a corresponding move. Adon pitched into the sixth inning while striking out nine, a 2021 season high for a pitcher making his major league debut. (Note: Adon tied Reynaldo López's nine strikeouts in his major league debut against the Los Angeles Dodgers on July 19, 2016, for the second-most by a Nationals pitcher in his debut, behind Stephen Strasburg's fourteen strikeouts in debuting against the Pittsburgh Pirates on June 10, 2010. (See Dougherty, Jesse, "From Nationals PR ...", twitter.com, October 3, 2021.)) Devers homered in the fourth inning to put the Red Sox on the board, then Adon ran into trouble after striking out Devers in the sixth inning. Reliever Patrick Murphy retired the side after allowing one inherited runner to score on an infield single by Christian Vázquez. The Nationals, meanwhile, got to Boston starter Chris Sale, who struck out seven but gave up a second-inning RBI double to Mercer and then walked Ryan Zimmerman with the bases loaded, and then tacked on three more against Garrett Richards in the fifth inning. The big blow was struck by veteran catcher Alex Avila in what he had already said would be his final major league game, doubling in Soto and Bell in the fifth. With their Wild Card Game berth on the line, the Red Sox evened the score against Erick Fedde in the seventh inning. Devers singled in Kyle Schwarber, whom the Nationals had traded to Boston at the deadline in July, before Alex Verdugo delivered a game-tying double. (Note: Fedde's blown save was the 36th and final of the Nationals' season, setting a new major league record for blown saves in a season. The record was previously set at 34 by the Colorado Rockies in 2004. (See Mears, Stephen G., "Mike Rizzo will begin his autopsy as the off-season begins!", TalkNats, October 4, 2021, and Castrovince, Anthony, "11 bonkers stats from '21 season", MLB.com, September 10, 2021.)) The Nationals failed to score in the eighth inning, and in the ninth inning, Mercer bungled a routine Schwarber grounder for an error before Finnegan served up a no-doubt two-run homer to Devers, his second of the game and third of the series, onto the batter's eye in center field. (Note: Finnegan's loss was the 42nd and final by a Nationals reliever in the season, setting a new major league record for bullpen losses in a season. (See Zuckerman, Mark, "Nats' offseason plan must start with improved pitching", Mid-Atlantic Sports Network, October 5, 2021.)) Former Nationals prospect Nick Pivetta retired the side in order in the bottom of the ninth inning, with Soto striking out for the third time of the day to end the game.

Being swept at the hands of the Red Sox in their only series of the month, the Nationals went 0–3 in October to fall to a 65–97 record of wins and losses in the 2021 season, fifth in the National League East Division and third-worst in the National League.

Soto finished second behind former teammate Trea Turner, who played for the Nationals through July and then played for the Los Angeles Dodgers in August, September, and October after being traded, for the National League batting title. Soto overtook Turner for a few days in September before fading down the stretch to finish with a .313 batting average. He finished first in on-base percentage (.465) in both the National League, where he earned his second straight Silver Slugger Award (Note: Soto became the fifth player in team history to win the Silver Slugger Award with the Nationals in multiple years, joining Ian Desmond, Daniel Murphy, Anthony Rendon, and Ryan Zimmerman. (See Zuckerman, Mark, "Soto wins second straight Silver Slugger Award", Mid-Atlantic Sports Network, November 11, 2021.)) and finished second to Bryce Harper of the Philadelphia Phillies in Most Valuable Player Award balloting, and all of MLB. Patrick Corbin, on the other hand, finished the season with a career-worst 5.82 ERA, the highest among all qualified pitchers.

=== Notable transactions ===
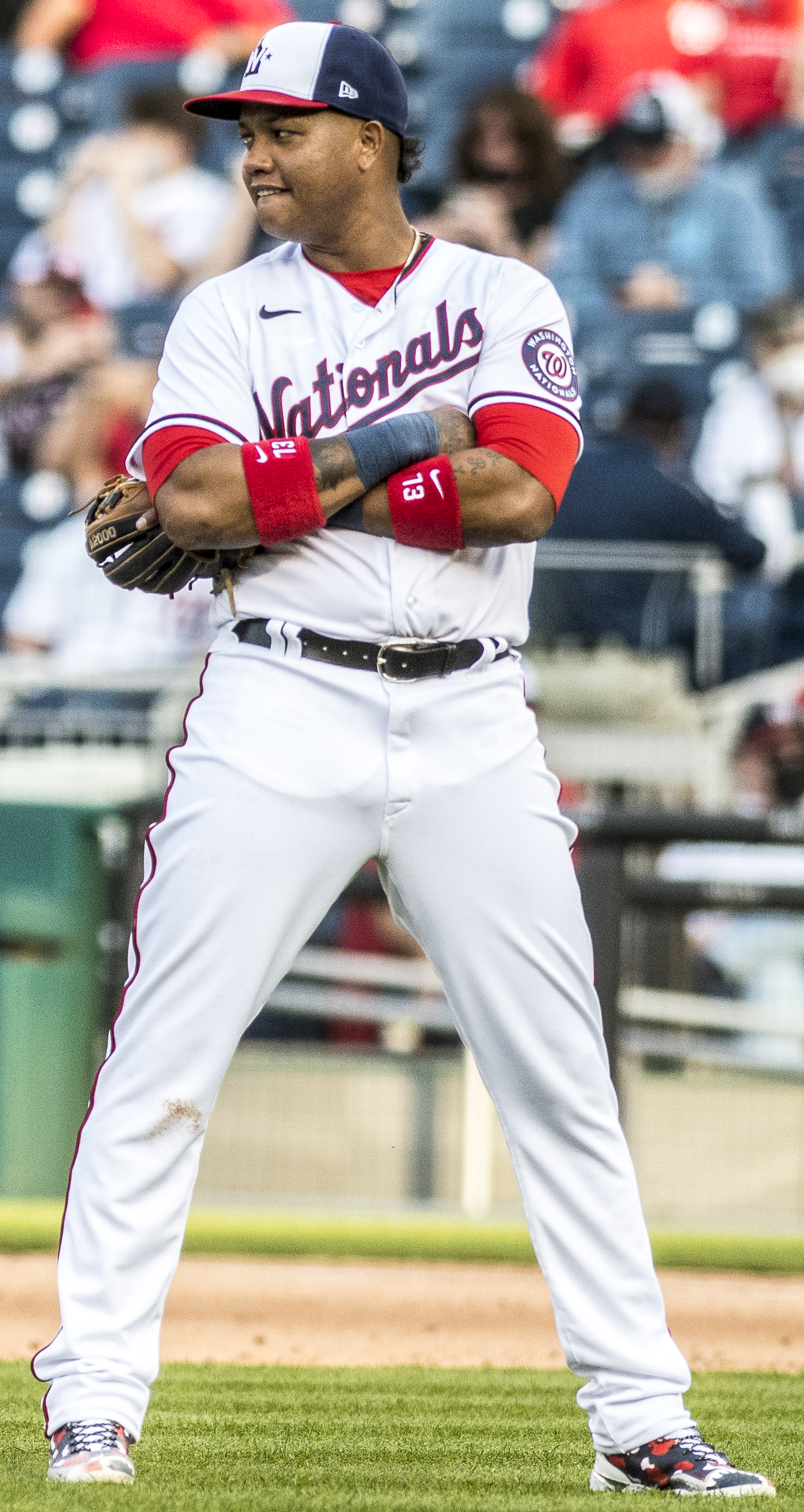
The Nationals released veteran infielder Starlin Castro in September after he was suspended under MLB's domestic violence and child abuse policy.

- April 12, 2021: The Nationals designated catcher Jonathan Lucroy for assignment; he elected free agency.
- April 18, 2021: The Nationals selected the contract of right-handed pitcher Paolo Espino from the alternate training site.
- May 4, 2021: The Nationals designated infielder/right-handed pitcher Hernán Pérez for assignment; he elected free agency.
- May 12, 2021: The Nationals signed outfielder Destin Hood to a minor league contract.
- May 29, 2021: The Nationals signed infielder Corban Joseph to a minor league contract.
- June 4, 2021: The Nationals signed left-handed pitcher Josh Rogers to a minor league contract.
- June 12, 2021: The Nationals selected the contract of right-handed pitchers Andrés Machado and Jefry Rodríguez from the Class-AAA Rochester Red Wings.
- June 15, 2021: The Nationals selected the contract of right-handed pitcher Justin Miller from the Class-AAA Rochester Red Wings and designated right-handed pitcher Rogelio Armenteros for assignment; he was outrighted to Class-AAA Rochester.
- June 20, 2021: The Nationals selected the contract of outfielder Gerardo Parra from the Class-AAA Rochester Red Wings and designated left-handed pitcher Ben Braymer for assignment; he was outrighted to Class-AAA Rochester.
- June 29, 2021: The Nationals selected the contract of left-handed pitcher Kyle Lobstein from the Class-AAA Rochester Red Wings and designated right-handed pitcher Justin Miller for assignment; he was selected off waivers by the St. Louis Cardinals.
- July 2, 2021: The Nationals selected the contract of infielder Humberto Arteaga from the Class-AAA Rochester Red Wings.
- July 3, 2021: The Nationals acquired minor league infielder Alcides Escobar from the Kansas City Royals for cash considerations, selected his contract from the Class-AAA Rochester Red Wings, and designated infielder Humberto Arteaga for assignment; he was outrighted to Class-AAA Rochester.
- July 6, 2021: The Nationals signed right-handed pitcher Nick Goody to a minor league contract.
- July 9, 2021: The Nationals signed infielder/outfielder Derek Dietrich to a minor league contract.
- July 10, 2021: The Nationals selected the contract of catcher Jakson Reetz from the Class-AAA Rochester Red Wings and designated left-handed pitcher Kyle Lobstein for assignment; he was purchased by the Milwaukee Brewers for cash considerations.
- July 16, 2021: The Nationals signed catcher René Rivera to a major league contract.
- July 29, 2021: The Nationals acquired catcher Riley Adams from the Toronto Blue Jays for left-handed pitcher Brad Hand and minor league pitcher Aldo Ramírez from the Boston Red Sox for outfielder Kyle Schwarber.
- July 30, 2021: The Nationals acquired right-handed pitcher Mason Thompson and minor league infielder Jordy Barley from the San Diego Padres for right-handed pitcher Daniel Hudson; right-handed pitchers Gerardo Carrillo and Josiah Gray, catcher Keibert Ruiz, and minor league outfielder Donovan Casey from the Los Angeles Dodgers for right-handed pitcher Max Scherzer and shortstop Trea Turner; minor league catcher Drew Millas and minor league pitchers Richard Guasch and Seth Shuman from the Oakland Athletics for catcher Yan Gomes and infielder/outfielder Josh Harrison; and outfielder Lane Thomas from the St. Louis Cardinals for left-handed pitcher Jon Lester; and selected the contracts of right-handed pitcher Gabe Klobosits and infielder Adrián Sánchez from the Class-AAA Rochester Red Wings.
- August 3, 2021: The Nationals selected the contract of right-handed pitcher Javy Guerra from the Class-AAA Rochester Red Wings.
- August 11, 2021: The Nationals selected the contract of left-handed pitcher Sean Nolin from the Class-AAA Rochester Red Wings.
- August 14, 2021: The Nationals claimed right-handed pitcher Patrick Murphy off waivers from the Toronto Blue Jays and released catcher René Rivera.
- August 22, 2021: The Nationals designated right-handed pitcher Javy Guerra for assignment; he elected free agency.
- August 23, 2021: The Nationals claimed first baseman Mike Ford off waivers from the Tampa Bay Rays.
- August 24, 2021: The Nationals designated right-handed pitcher Jefry Rodríguez for assignment; he was outrighted to the Class-AAA Rochester Red Wings.
- September 1, 2021: The Nationals selected the contract of left-handed pitcher Alberto Baldonado from the Class-AAA Rochester Red Wings.
- September 3, 2021: The Nationals released third baseman Starlin Castro.
- September 4, 2021: The Nationals selected the contract of left-handed pitcher Josh Rogers from the Class-AAA Rochester Red Wings.
- September 13, 2021: The Nationals designated infielder Adrián Sánchez for assignment; he was outrighted to the Class-AAA Rochester Red Wings.
- September 23, 2021: The Nationals selected the contract of right-handed pitcher Jhon Romero from the Class-AAA Rochester Red Wings and designated catcher Jakson Reetz for assignment; he was outrighted to Class-AAA Rochester.

=== Major league debuts ===
- April 7, 2021: Cody Wilson, Sam Clay
- July 10, 2021: Jakson Reetz
- July 30, 2021: Gabe Klobosits
- September 2, 2021: Alberto Baldonado
- September 24, 2021: Jhon Romero
- October 3, 2021: Joan Adon

=== Game log ===
Legend
	Nationals win
	Nationals loss
	Postponement
	Eliminated from playoff race
**Bold**	Nationals team member

2021 game log: 65–97 (Home: 35–46; Away: 30–51)
April: 10–12 (Home: 6–5; Away: 4–7)

#	Date	Opponent	Score	Win	Loss	Save	Attendance	Record
–	April 1	Mets	Postponed (COVID-19, Makeup June 19)					
–	April 3	Mets	Postponed (COVID-19, Makeup June 28)					
–	April 4	Mets	Postponed (COVID-19, Makeup September 4)					
–	April 5	Braves	Postponed (COVID-19, Makeup April 7)					
1	April 6	Braves	6–5	**Hudson** (1–0)	Smith (0–1)	—	4,801	1–0
2	April 7 (1)	Braves	6–7 (7)	Tomlin (1–0)	**Fedde** (0–1)	Smith (1)	4,927	1–1
3	April 7 (2)	Braves	0–2 (7)	Jackson (1–0)	**Rainey** (0–1)	Newcomb (1)	4,927	1–2
4	April 9	@ Dodgers	0–1	Buehler (1–0)	**Avilán** (0–1)	Knebel (2)	15,036	1–3
5	April 10	@ Dodgers	5–9	Urías (2–0)	**Corbin** (0–1)	—	15,021	1–4
6	April 11	@ Dodgers	0–3	Kershaw (2–1)	**Scherzer** (0–1)	Jansen (2)	15,049	1–5
7	April 12	@ Cardinals	5–2	**Finnegan** (1–0)	Gant (0–1)	**Hand** (1)	12,894	2–5
8	April 13	@ Cardinals	3–14	Flaherty (2–0)	**Strasburg** (0–1)	—	12,714	2–6
9	April 14	@ Cardinals	6–0	**Ross** (1–0)	Wainwright (0–2)	—	13,206	3–6
10	April 15	Diamondbacks	6–11	Kelly (1–2)	**Corbin** (0–2)	—	6,666	3–7
11	April 16	Diamondbacks	1–0	**Hand** (1–0)	Young (0–3)	—	8,056	4–7
12	April 17	Diamondbacks	6–2	**Fedde** (1–1)	Weaver (1–1)	—	8,305	5–7
13	April 18	Diamondbacks	2–5	Bumgarner (1–2)	**Espino** (0–1)	Crichton (1)	8,478	5–8
14	April 19	Cardinals	5–12	Flaherty (3–0)	**Ross** (1–1)	—	7,542	5–9
15	April 20	Cardinals	3–2	**Hudson** (2–0)	Gallegos (2–1)	**Hand** (2)	8,418	6–9
16	April 21	Cardinals	1–0	**Scherzer** (1–1)	Martínez (0–4)	**Hand** (3)	7,769	7–9
17	April 23	@ Mets	0–6	deGrom (2–1)	**Fedde** (1–2)	—	8,130	7–10
18	April 24	@ Mets	7–1	**Ross** (2–1)	Stroman (3–1)	—	8,051	8–10
19	April 25	@ Mets	0–4	Walker (1–1)	**Corbin** (0–3)	—	7,784	8–11
20	April 27	@ Blue Jays	5–9	Milone (1–0)	**Scherzer** (1–2)	—	1,471	8–12
21	April 28	@ Blue Jays	8–2	**Fedde** (2–2)	Matz (4–1)	—	1,274	9–12
22	April 30	Marlins	2–1 (10)	**Hand** (2–0)	García (2–2)	—	8,295	10–12

May: 11–17 (Home: 7–10; Away: 4–7)

#	Date	Opponent	Score	Win	Loss	Save	Attendance	Record
23	May 1	Marlins	7–2	**Corbin** (1–3)	Campbell (0–2)	—	8,510	11–12
24	May 2	Marlins	3–1	**Scherzer** (2–2)	Rogers (3–2)	—	8,482	12–12
25	May 4	Braves	1–6	Ynoa (3–1)	**Ross** (2–2)	—	8,156	12–13
26	May 5	Braves	3–5	Fried (1–1)	**Fedde** (2–3)	Smith (6)	8,400	12–14
27	May 6	Braves	2–3	Smyly (1–2)	**Lester** (0–1)	Smith (7)	8,561	12–15
28	May 7	@ Yankees	11–4	**Finnegan** (2–0)	Loáisiga (3–2)	—	10,010	13–15
29	May 8	@ Yankees	3–4 (11)	Wilson (1–0)	**Rainey** (0–2)	—	10,850	13–16
30	May 9	@ Yankees	2–3	Chapman (2–0)	**Hand** (2–1)	—	10,092	13–17
31	May 11	Phillies	2–6	Anderson (2–3)	**Fedde** (2–4)	—	8,559	13–18
32	May 12	Phillies	2–5 (10)	Alvarado (3–0)	**Hand** (2–2)	Neris (7)	8,610	13–19
33	May 13	Phillies	5–1	**Corbin** (2–3)	Eflin (2–2)	—	8,710	14–19
34	May 14	@ Diamondbacks	17–2	**Scherzer** (3–2)	Smith (1–3)	—	11,907	15–19
35	May 15	@ Diamondbacks	4–11	Young (1–3)	**Ross** (2–3)	—	13,462	15–20
36	May 16	@ Diamondbacks	3–0	**Fedde** (3–4)	Crichton (0–2)	**Hand** (4)	11,619	16–20
37	May 17	@ Cubs	3–7	Alzolay (2–3)	**Lester** (0–2)	—	11,144	16–21
38	May 18	@ Cubs	3–6	Thompson (2–1)	**Harris** (0–1)	Kimbrel (8)	11,142	16–22
39	May 19	@ Cubs	4–3	**Scherzer** (4–2)	Arrieta (4–4)	**Hand** (5)	11,145	17–22
40	May 20	@ Cubs	2–5	Steele (2–0)	**Ross** (2–4)	Kimbrel (9)	11,143	17–23
41	May 21	Orioles	4–2	**Strasburg** (1–1)	López (1–5)	—	14,369	18–23
42	May 22	Orioles	12–9	**Hudson** (3–0)	Plutko (1–1)	**Hand** (6)	15,440	19–23
43	May 23	Orioles	6–5	**Corbin** (3–3)	Harvey (3–5)	**Hand** (7)	14,618	20–23
44	May 25	Reds	1–2	Mahle (3–2)	**Scherzer** (4–3)	Sims (2)	8,935	20–24
—	May 26	Reds	Suspended (Inclement weather, Continuation May 27)					
45	May 27 (1)	Reds	5–3	**Voth** (1–0)	Hoffman (3–4)	**Hand** (8)	7,343	21–24
46	May 27 (2)	Reds	0–3	Gray (1–3)	**Strasburg** (1–2)	Sims (3)	9,020	21–25
—	May 28	Brewers	Postponed (rain; makeup May 29)					
47	May 29 (1)	Brewers	1–4	Peralta (5–1)	**Corbin** (3–4)	—	9,910	21–26
48	May 29 (2)	Brewers	2–6	Suter (5–3)	**Hudson** (3–1)	—	12,529	21–27
49	May 30	Brewers	0–3	Woodruff (4–2)	**Scherzer** (4–4)	Hader (12)	15,326	21–28
50	May 31	@ Braves	3–5	Morton (4–2)	**Ross** (2–5)	Smith (9)	37,668	21–29

June: 19–9 (Home: 11–3; Away: 8–6)

#	Date	Opponent	Score	Win	Loss	Save	Attendance	Record
51	June 1	@ Braves	11–6	**Voth** (2–0)	Fried (2–3)	—	24,083	22–29
52	June 2	@ Braves	5–3	**Hudson** (4–1)	Minter (1–2)	**Hand** (9)	32,752	23–29
53	June 3	@ Braves	1–5	Tomlin (3–0)	**Corbin** (3–5)	—	25,595	23–30
54	June 4	@ Phillies	2–1	**Scherzer** (5–4)	Wheeler (4–3)	**Hand** (10)	15,030	24–30
55	June 5	@ Phillies	2–5	Suárez (1–0)	**Ross** (2–6)	Brogdon (1)	16,118	24–31
56	June 6	@ Phillies	6–12	Coonrod (1–2)	**Finnegan** (2–1)	—	15,108	24–32
57	June 8	@ Rays	1–3	Glasnow (5–2)	**Suero** (0–1)	Castillo (10)	7,173	24–33
58	June 9	@ Rays	9–7 (11)	**Hand** (3–2)	Castillo (2–3)	**Rainey** (1)	7,616	25–33
—	June 10	Giants	Postponed (rain; makeup June 12)					
59	June 11	Giants	0–1	DeSclafani (6–2)	**Espino** (0–2)	—	18,029	25–34
60	June 12 (1)	Giants	2–0 (7)	**Fedde** (4–4)	Gausman (7–1)	**Hand** (11)	16,425	26–34
61	June 12 (2)	Giants	1–2 (8)	McGee (2–2)	**Finnegan** (2–2)	Baragar (1)	24,066	26–35
62	June 13	Giants	5–0	**Ross** (3–6)	Cueto (4–3)	—	21,569	27–35
63	June 14	Pirates	3–2	**Finnegan** (3–2)	Holmes (2–2)	**Hand** (12)	14,859	28–35
64	June 15	Pirates	8–1	**Corbin** (4–5)	Anderson (3–7)	—	16,886	29–35
65	June 16	Pirates	3–1	**Espino** (1–2)	De Jong (0–1)	**Hand** (13)	16,781	30–35
66	June 18	Mets	1–0	**Hand** (4–2)	Díaz (1–2)	—	26,246	31–35
67	June 19 (1)	Mets	1–5 (7)	Loup (2–0)	**Ross** (3–7)	—	14,434	31–36
68	June 19 (2)	Mets	6–2 (7)	**Lester** (1–2)	Gsellman (0–1)	**Hand** (14)	22,111	32–36
69	June 20	Mets	5–2	**Corbin** (5–5)	Walker (6–3)	**Hand** (15)	30,371	33–36
70	June 22	@ Phillies	3–2	**Scherzer** (6–4)	Wheeler (5–4)	**Hand** (16)	19,652	34–36
71	June 23	@ Phillies	13–12	**Rainey** (1–2)	Neris (1–4)	**Espino** (1)	17,892	35–36
72	June 24	@ Marlins	7–3	**Ross** (4–7)	Poteet (2–3)	—	5,255	36–36
73	June 25	@ Marlins	2–11	López (4–4)	**Lester** (1–3)	—	4,749	36–37
74	June 26	@ Marlins	2–3	Thompson (2–2)	**Corbin** (5–6)	García (12)	6,305	36–38
75	June 27	@ Marlins	5–1	**Scherzer** (7–4)	Alcántara (4–7)	—	7,349	37–38
76	June 28	Mets	8–4	**Espino** (2–2)	Eickhoff (0–1)	**Hand** (17)	19,150	38–38
77	June 29	Rays	4–3	**Ross** (5–7)	Hill (6–3)	**Hand** (18)	17,117	39–38
78	June 30	Rays	15–6	**Lester** (2–3)	Sherriff (0–1)	—	15,552	40–38

July: 8–18 (Home: 4–8; Away: 4–10)

#	Date	Opponent	Score	Win	Loss	Save	Attendance	Record
79	July 1	Dodgers	2–6 (5)	Gonsolin (1–0)	**Corbin** (5–7)	—	21,285	40–39
80	July 2	Dodgers	5–10	Urías (10–3)	**Clay** (0–1)	—	27,689	40–40
81	July 3	Dodgers	3–5	Graterol (1–0)	**Suero** (0–2)	Jansen (21)	42,064	40–41
82	July 4	Dodgers	1–5	Price (4–0)	**Ross** (5–8)	—	37,187	40–42
83	July 5	@ Padres	7–5	**Suero** (1–2)	Hill (5–4)	**Hand** (19)	33,168	41–42
84	July 6	@ Padres	4–7	Weathers (4–2)	**Fedde** (4–5)	Melancon (26)	29,977	41–43
85	July 7	@ Padres	15–5	**Corbin** (6–7)	Paddack (4–6)	—	26,353	42–43
86	July 8	@ Padres	8–9	Melancon (2–1)	**Clay** (0–2)	—	29,434	42–44
87	July 9	@ Giants	3–5	García (1–2)	**Clay** (0–3)	McGee (18)	27,345	42–45
88	July 10	@ Giants	4–10	DeSclafani (10–3)	**Lester** (2–4)	—	25,901	42–46
89	July 11	@ Giants	1–3	Gausman (9–3)	**Fedde** (4–6)	McGee (19)	26,639	42–47
**All–Star Break (July 12–15)**
90	July 16	Padres	8–24	Paddack (5–6)	**Fedde** (4–7)	—	29,203	42–48
91	July 17^{[a]}/18	Padres	4–10	Stammen (4–2)	**Corbin** (6–8)	—	33,232	42–49
92	July 18	Padres	8–7	**Hand** (5–2)	Melancon (2–2)	—	27,221	43–49
93	July 19	Marlins	18–1	**Lester** (3–4)	Detwiler (1–1)	—	15,283	44–49
94	July 20	Marlins	6–3	**Voth** (3–0)	Bleier (2–1)	**Hand** (20)	17,362	45–49
95	July 21	Marlins	1–3 (10)	Floro (3–4)	**Hand** (5–3)	García (14)	21,058	45–50
96	July 23	@ Orioles	1–6	Fry (4–3)	**Corbin** (6–9)	—	17,022	45–51
97	July 24	@ Orioles	3–5	Harvey (5–10)	**Lester** (3–5)	Tate (2)	30,898	45–52
98	July 25	@ Orioles	4–5	Sulser (3–1)	**Hand** (5–4)	—	15,690	45–53
99	July 26	@ Phillies	5–6	Bradley (5–1)	**Hand** (5–5)	—	23,265	45–54
100	July 27	@ Phillies	6–4	**Suero** (2–2)	Moore (0–3)	**Hand** (21)	20,135	46–54
—	July 28	@ Phillies	Postponed (COVID-19, Makeup July 29th)					
101	July 29 (1)	@ Phillies	3–1 (7)	**Scherzer** (8–4)	Wheeler (8–6)	**Finnegan** (1)	N/A	47–54
102	July 29 (2)	@ Phillies	8–11 (8)	Suárez (5–3)	**Clay** (0–4)	—	19,219	47–55
103	July 30	Cubs	4–3	**Espino** (3–2)	Arrieta (5–10)	**Finnegan** (2)	33,882	48–55
104	July 31	Cubs	3–6	Hendricks (13–4)	**Ross** (5–9)	Ryan (1)	31,444	48–56

August: 7–20 (Home: 3–9; Away: 4–11)

#	Date	Opponent	Score	Win	Loss	Save	Attendance	Record
105	August 1	Cubs	6–5	**Finnegan** (4–2)	Rodríguez (0–1)	—	25,520	49–56
106	August 2	Phillies	5–7	Bradley (6–1)	**Klobosits** (0–1)	—	16,393	49–57
107	August 3	Phillies	4–5	Wheeler (9–6)	**Corbin** (6–10)	Alvarado (4)	17,417	49–58
108	August 4	Phillies	5–9	Moore (1–3)	**Espino** (3–3)	—	18,482	49–59
109	August 5	Phillies	6–7	Llovera (1–0)	**Finnegan** (4–3)	Bradley (2)	22,575	49–60
110	August 6	@ Braves	4–8	Santana (2–0)	**Fedde** (4–8)	—	34,454	49–61
111	August 7	@ Braves	3–2	**Machado** (1–0)	Smith (3–6)	**Finnegan** (3)	38,300	50–61
112	August 8	@ Braves	4–5	Fried (9–7)	**Corbin** (6–11)	Martin (1)	29,101	50–62
113	August 10^{[b]}/11	@ Mets	7–8	May (5–2)	**Thompson** (0–1)	Díaz (24)	N/A	50–63
—	August 11	@ Mets	Postponed (Rain, Makeup August 12th)					
114	August 12 (1)	@ Mets	1–4	Stroman (8–11)	**Nolin** (0–1)	Díaz (25)	N/A	50–64
115	August 12 (2)	@ Mets	4–5	Familia (6–2)	**Finnegan** (4–4)	—	25,870	50–65
116	August 13	Braves	2–4	Morton (11–3)	**Gray** (0–1)	Smith (24)	24,812	50–66
117	August 14	Braves	2–12	Fried (10–7)	**Corbin** (6–12)	—	27,959	50–67
118	August 15	Braves	5–6	Chavez (3–2)	**Espino** (3–4)	Smith (25)	27,488	50–68
119	August 17	Blue Jays	12–6	**Fedde** (5–8)	Manoah (5–2)	—	20,060	51–68
120	August 18	Blue Jays	8–5	**Thompson** (1–1)	Hand (5–7)	**Finnegan** (4)	18,336	52–68
121	August 20	@ Brewers	4–1	**Corbin** (7–12)	Anderson (4–7)	**Finnegan** (5)	27,998	53–68
122	August 21	@ Brewers	6–9	Williams (7–1)	**Guerra** (0–1)	Hader (25)	36,938	53–69
123	August 22	@ Brewers	3–7	Strickland (2–1)	**Nolin** (0–2)	Hader (26)	33,507	53–70
124	August 24	@ Marlins	5–1	**Fedde** (6–8)	Luzardo (4–7)	—	5,394	54–70
125	August 25	@ Marlins	3–4 (10)	Floro (5–4)	**Finnegan** (4–5)	—	6,237	54–71
126	August 26	@ Marlins	5–7	Hernández (1–1)	**Corbin** (7–13)	Floro (6)	5,447	54–72
127	August 27	@ Mets	2–1	**Espino** (4–4)	Hill (6–6)	**Finnegan** (6)	20,274	55–72
128	August 28	@ Mets	3–5	May (6–2)	**Harper** (0–1)	Díaz (26)	27,870	55–73
129	August 29	@ Mets	4–9	Megill (2–3)	**Fedde** (6–9)	—	24,247	55–74
130	August 30	Phillies	4–7	Wheeler (11–9)	**Gray** (0–2)	Alvarado (5)	17,353	55–75
131	August 31	Phillies	6–12	Falter (2–0)	**Corbin** (7–14)	—	16,844	55–76

September/October: 10–21 (Home: 4–11; Away: 6–10)

#	Date	Opponent	Score	Win	Loss	Save	Attendance	Record
—	September 1	Phillies	Postponed (rain; makeup September 2)					
132	September 2	Phillies	6–7	Coonrod (2–2)	**Machado** (1–1)	Kennedy (22)	12,280	55–77
133	September 3	Mets	2–6 (10)	Díaz (5–4)	**Voth** (3–1)	—	26,779	55–78
134	September 4 (1)	Mets	9–11 (9)	May (7–2)	**Finnegan** (4–6)	Hembree (9)	13,916	55–79
135	September 4 (2)	Mets	4–3 (7)	**Rogers** (1–0)	Megill (1–2)	**Finnegan** (7)	22,420	56–79
136	September 5	Mets	6–13	Loup (5–0)	**Machado** (1–2)	—	22,162	56–80
137	September 6	Mets	4–3	**Finnegan** (5–6)	Díaz (5–5)	—	17,623	57–80
138	September 7	@ Braves	5–8	Jackson (2–2)	**Harper** (0–2)	Smith (31)	20,544	57–81
139	September 8	@ Braves	4–2	**Voth** (4–1)	Rodríguez (4–3)	**Finnegan** (8)	20,074	58–81
140	September 9	@ Braves	6–7 (10)	Webb (3–2)	**Suero** (2–3)	—	23,657	58–82
141	September 10	@ Pirates	3–4	Kuhl (5–6)	**Murphy** (0–2)	—	11,808	58–83
142	September 11	@ Pirates	7–10	Keller (1–1)	**Baldonado** (0–1)	Stratton (4)	17,993	58–84
143	September 12	@ Pirates	6–2	**Corbin** (8–14)	Wilson (2–7)	**Finnegan** (9)	9,174	59–84
144	September 13	Marlins	0–3	Alcántara (9–13)	**Espino** (4–5)	Floro (11)	19,759	59–85
145	September 14	Marlins	8–2	**Fedde** (7–9)	Luzardo (5–8)	—	17,030	60–85
146	September 15	Marlins	6–8	Campbell (2–3)	**Finnegan** (5–7)	Floro (12)	16,309	60–86
147	September 17	Rockies	8–9	Gilbreath (2–1)	**Finnegan** (5–8)	Estévez (9)	21,195	60–87
148	September 18	Rockies	0–6	Freeland (6–8)	**Corbin** (8–15)	—	29,315	60–88
149	September 19	Rockies	3–0	**Espino** (5–5)	Gray (8–11)	**Finnegan** (10)	26,303	61–88
150	September 20	@ Marlins	7–8 (10)	Floro (6–6)	**Clay** (0–6)	—	5,383	61–89
151	September 21	@ Marlins	7–1	**Rogers** (2–0)	Rogers (7–8)	—	5,926	62–89
152	September 22	@ Marlins	7–5	**Gray** (1–2)	Hernández (1–3)	**Rainey** (2)	5,908	63–89
153	September 23	@ Reds	3–2	**Corbin** (9–15)	Castillo (8–16)	**Finnegan** (11)	11,836	64–89
154	September 24	@ Reds	7–8 (11)	Warren (3–0)	**Thompson** (1–2)	—	16,021	64–90
155	September 25	@ Reds	6–7	Givens (4–3)	**Murphy** (0–3)	—	18,293	64–91
156	September 26	@ Reds	2–9	Mahle (13–6)	**Rogers** (2–1)	—	21,328	64–92
157	September 27	@ Rockies	5–4	**Gray** (2–2)	Márquez (12–11)	**Rainey** (3)	20,388	65–92
158	September 28	@ Rockies	1–3	Freeland (7–8)	**Corbin** (9–16)	Estévez (10)	21,693	65–93
159	September 29	@ Rockies	5–10	Goudeau (2–1)	**Thompson** (1–3)	—	20,613	65–94
160	October 1	Red Sox	2–4	Rodríguez (12–8)	**Rogers** (2–2)	Robles (13)	32,521	65–95
161	October 2	Red Sox	3–5	Davis (1–2)	**Rainey** (1–3)	Robles (14)	41,465	65–96
162	October 3	Red Sox	5–7	Rodríguez (13–8)	**Finnegan** (5–9)	Pivetta (1)	33,986	65–97

^{^[a]} Game suspended in the middle of the 6th with the Padres leading, 8–4, due to Nationals Park shooting; completed on July 18 before the regularly scheduled game.
^{^[b]} Game suspended in the top of the 2nd with the Nationals leading, 3–1, due to rain; completed on August 11 before the regularly scheduled game.

== Roster ==
2021 Washington Nationals
Roster
Pitchers: 60 Joan Adon; 70 Luis Avilán; 62 Alberto Baldonado; 49 Sam Clay; 46 Patrick Corbin; 52 Paolo Espino; 23 Erick Fedde; 67 Kyle Finnegan; 40 Josiah Gray; 43 Javy Guerra; 52 Brad Hand; 33 Ryne Harper; 36 Will Harris; 44 Daniel Hudson; 68 Gabe Klobosits; 34 Jon Lester; 63 Kyle Lobstein; 57 Andrés Machado; 61 Kyle McGowin; 60 Justin Miller; 52 Patrick Murphy; 74 Sean Nolin; 21 Tanner Rainey; 39 Jefry Rodríguez; 65 Josh Rogers; 73 Jhon Romero; 41 Joe Ross; 31 Max Scherzer; 37 Stephen Strasburg; 51 Wander Suero; 71 Mason Thompson; 50 Austin Voth	Catchers: 25 Riley Adams; 6 Alex Avila; 38 Tres Barrera; 10 Yan Gomes; 28 Jonathan Lucroy; 47 René Rivera; 76 Jakson Reetz; 20 Keibert Ruiz; Infielders: 1 Humberto Arteaga; 19 Josh Bell; 14 Starlin Castro; 3 Alcides Escobar; 2 Luis García Jr.; 5 Josh Harrison; 8 Carter Kieboom; 27 Jordy Mercer; 3 Hernán Pérez; 9 Adrián Sánchez; 7 Trea Turner; 11 Ryan Zimmerman	Outfielders: 29 Yadiel Hernández; 88 Gerardo Parra; 16 Víctor Robles; 12 Kyle Schwarber; 22 Juan Soto; 17 Andrew Stevenson; 28 Lane Thomas; Other batters: 81 Cody Wilson	Manager: 4 Dave Martinez; Coaches: 85 Brett Austin (bullpen catcher); 35 Henry Blanco (bullpen); 24 Tim Bogar (bench); 15 Bob Henley (third base); 48 Jim Hickey (pitching); 53 Randy Knorr (first base); 54 Kevin Long (hitting); 87 Octavio Martinez (bullpen catcher); 66 Pat Roessler (assistant hitting); 26 Brandon Snyder (bullpen catcher)

== Statistics ==
=== Batting ===
(Updated as of 10/03/2021)

Note: G = Games played; AB = At bats; R = Runs; H = Hits; 2B = Doubles; 3B = Triples; HR = Home runs; RBI = Runs batted in; SB = Stolen bases; Avg. = Batting average; OBP = On base percentage; SLG = Slugging percentage

Player	G	AB	R	H	2B	3B	HR	RBI	SB	AVG	OBP	SLG
Juan Soto	151	502	111	157	20	2	29	95	9	.313	.465	.534
Josh Bell	144	498	75	130	24	1	27	88	0	.261	.347	.476
Trea Turner	96	388	66	125	17	3	18	49	21	.322	.369	.521
Josh Harrison	90	320	39	94	23	2	6	38	5	.294	.366	.434
Alcides Escobar	75	319	53	92	21	2	4	28	3	.288	.340	.404
Starlin Castro	87	315	25	89	20	0	3	38	0	.283	.333	.375
Victor Robles	107	315	37	64	21	1	2	19	8	.203	.310	.295
Kyle Schwarber	72	265	42	67	9	0	25	53	1	.253	.340	.570
Yadiel Hernández	112	264	33	72	8	1	9	32	3	.273	.329	.413
Ryan Zimmerman	110	255	27	62	16	0	14	46	0	.243	.286	.471
Luis García Jr.	70	236	29	57	18	2	6	22	0	.242	.275	.411
Yan Gomes	63	218	30	59	11	1	9	35	0	.271	.323	.454
Carter Kieboom	62	217	26	45	6	0	6	20	0	.207	.301	.318
Andrew Stevenson	109	192	22	44	6	0	5	23	1	.229	.294	.339
Lane Thomas	45	178	33	48	14	2	7	27	4	.270	.364	.489
Jordy Mercer	46	118	13	30	7	0	2	9	0	.254	.307	.364
Gerardo Parra	53	97	13	23	5	0	2	10	1	.237	.292	.351
Tres Barrera	30	91	8	24	3	1	2	10	0	.264	.374	.385
Alex Avila	34	89	5	17	9	1	1	9	0	.191	.345	.348
Keibert Ruiz	23	81	9	23	3	0	2	14	0	.284	.348	.395
Riley Adams	35	71	11	19	6	1	2	10	0	.268	.422	.465
Adrián Sánchez	16	35	5	9	2	0	0	1	0	.257	.316	.314
Hernán Pérez	10	19	1	1	0	0	0	0	0	.053	.143	.053
René Rivera	4	14	2	3	0	0	0	0	0	.214	.267	.214
Jonathan Lucroy	5	14	0	5	1	0	0	2	0	.357	.357	.429
Humberto Arteaga	1	3	0	0	0	0	0	1	0	.000	.000	.000
Jakson Reetz	2	2	1	1	1	0	0	0	0	.500	.500	1.000
Cody Wilson	1	1	0	0	0	0	0	0	0	.000	.000	.000
Pitcher totals	162	268	8	28	1	0	1	7	0	.104	.136	.119
Team totals	162	5385	724	1388	272	20	182	686	56	.258	.337	.417

=== Pitching ===
(Updated as of 10/03/2021)

Note: W = Wins; L = Losses; ERA = Earned run average; G = Games pitched; GS = Games started; SV = Saves; IP = Innings pitched; R = Runs allowed; ER = Earned runs allowed; BB = Walks allowed; K = Strikeouts

Player	W	L	ERA	G	GS	SV	IP	H	R	ER	BB	K
Patrick Corbin	9	16	5.82	31	31	0	171.2	192	114	111	60	143
Erick Fedde	7	9	5.47	29	27	0	133.1	144	90	81	48	128
Max Scherzer	8	4	2.76	19	19	0	111.0	71	36	34	28	47
Paolo Espino	5	5	4.27	35	19	1	109.2	108	53	52	25	92
Joe Ross	5	9	4.17	20	19	0	108.0	98	57	50	34	109
Jon Lester	3	5	5.02	16	16	0	75.1	91	50	42	29	51
Kyle Finnegan	5	9	3.55	68	0	11	66.0	64	39	26	34	68
Josiah Gray	2	2	5.31	12	12	0	62.2	56	38	37	28	63
Austin Voth	4	1	5.34	49	1	0	57.1	57	35	34	28	59
Sam Clay	0	5	5.60	58	0	0	45.0	55	32	28	22	34
Brad Hand	5	5	3.59	41	0	21	42.2	31	22	17	18	42
Wander Suero	2	3	6.33	45	0	0	42.2	45	35	30	15	44
Ryne Harper	0	2	4.04	34	0	0	35.2	28	16	16	14	31
Andrés Machado	1	2	3.53	40	0	0	35.2	30	17	14	15	30
Josh Rogers	2	2	3.28	6	6	0	35.2	32	13	13	14	22
Daniel Hudson	4	1	2.20	31	0	0	32.2	23	9	8	7	48
Tanner Rainey	1	3	7.39	38	0	3	31.2	29	27	26	25	42
Kyle McGowin	0	0	4.20	27	0	0	30.0	21	14	14	14	35
Sean Nolin	0	2	4.39	10	5	0	26.2	32	13	13	13	20
Jefry Rodríguez	0	0	5.92	14	1	0	24.1	25	16	16	17	20
Stephen Strasburg	1	2	4.57	5	5	0	21.2	16	12	11	14	21
Mason Thompson	1	3	4.15	27	0	0	21.2	28	14	10	14	21
Patrick Murphy	0	2	5.30	17	0	0	18.2	19	12	11	6	23
Gabe Klobosits	0	1	5.56	11	0	0	11.1	13	8	7	5	5
Alberto Baldonado	0	1	8.44	14	0	0	10.2	10	10	10	7	12
Javy Guerra	0	1	16.50	6	0	0	6.0	12	13	11	3	4
Will Harris	0	1	9.00	8	0	0	6.0	7	6	6	3	9
Joan Adon	0	0	3.38	1	1	0	5.1	6	2	2	3	9
Luis Avilán	0	1	12.60	4	0	0	5.0	7	7	7	3	4
Jhon Romero	0	0	4.50	5	0	0	4.0	5	2	2	0	3
Justin Miller	0	0	15.00	5	0	0	3.0	5	5	5	1	4
Hernan Pérez	0	0	0.00	2	0	0	2.0	1	0	0	0	2
Kyle Lobstein	0	0	20.25	3	0	0	1.1	3	3	3	1	1
Team totals	65	97	4.80	162	162	36	1394.1	1364	820	743	548	1346

== Awards and honors ==
=== All-Stars ===
No Nationals placed first in the fan voting for their positions, determining the starters for the 2021 Major League Baseball All-Star Game in Denver, Colorado. Shortstop Trea Turner and left fielder Kyle Schwarber were selected by a vote of MLB players as reserves for the National League. Right fielder Juan Soto was chosen as a reserve by league officials. Starting pitcher Max Scherzer was a late addition to the All-Star roster after pitchers who had originally been selected to participate withdrew from the exhibition contest. Manager Dave Roberts named Scherzer as his starting pitcher for the game.

Additionally, Soto accepted an invitation to compete in the 2021 Home Run Derby. He was assigned the eighth seed, facing off against top-seeded Los Angeles Angels pitcher/designated hitter Shohei Ohtani, who led MLB in home runs entering the All-Star Break. Soto advanced over Ohtani after the two hitters tied with 22 home runs, then each homered six times in a 1-minute tiebreaker, then Soto homered on each of his three swings in a "swing-off"; Ohtani grounded out on his first swing following Soto's display. He lost in the penultimate round to eventual champion Pete Alonso of the New York Mets.

=== Annual awards ===
Juan Soto was one of three National League outfielders to receive the Silver Slugger Award following the 2021 season. It was his second year in a row as a recipient of the award, given annually to the top offensive players at each position.

Max Scherzer and Soto were among the finalists for the Cy Young Award and the Most Valuable Player Award, respectively, in the National League. Scherzer finished third behind winner Corbin Burnes of the Milwaukee Brewers, while Soto finished second behind former National Bryce Harper of the division-rival Philadelphia Phillies, who won NL MVP for the second time. Trea Turner placed fifth in MVP voting, while Scherzer also picked up votes to finish fourteenth.

== Farm system ==
The professional agreement between Major League Baseball and Minor League Baseball expired after the 2020 season, in which minor league teams did not play due to the COVID-19 pandemic. The Nationals announced on December 9, 2020, that they had extended invitations to four minor league teams to serve as their affiliates for the 2021 season:

Level	Team	League	Manager
Triple-A	Rochester Red Wings	Triple-A East	Matthew LeCroy
Double-A	Harrisburg Senators	Double-A Northeast	Tripp Keister
High-A	Wilmington Blue Rocks	High-A East	Tommy Shields
Low-A	Fredericksburg Nationals	Low-A East	Mario Lisson
Rookie	FCL Nationals	Florida Complex League	Jake Lowery
Rookie	DSL Nationals	Dominican Summer League	Sandy Martínez

Due to the ongoing pandemic and delayed start to the minor league season, major league teams were given the option to designate an alternate training site for players not on the active roster during the regular season. As they did in 2020, the Washington Nationals designated the New Fredericksburg Ballpark, home of the Class-A Fredericksburg Nationals, as their alternate training site.

== Broadcasting ==
The Nationals are minority owners of the Mid-Atlantic Sports Network, which they share with the Baltimore Orioles under an agreement brokered by Major League Baseball. MASN televised most Nationals games in 2021. 106.7 The Fan returned as the Nationals' radio broadcast station.

Bob Carpenter returned for his 16th year as the Nationals' play-by-play commentator. F. P. Santangelo returned for his 10th year as the Nationals' color commentator. In January 2021, MASN announced it would reduce its pregame and postgame coverage and sideline reporting and would not bring back analysts Dan Kolko and Bo Porter or sideline reporter Alex Chappell, a decision the Nationals said they were "incredibly disappointed and upset" by. The Nationals signed Kolko to a broadcasting deal independent from MASN in March, and Kolko went on to make appearances on both MASN and WJFK-FM throughout the season.

MASN chose not to broadcast most of the Nationals' spring training games, although it televised the last two preseason games on March 28 and March 29 before the regular season began.

=== Santangelo investigations ===
Color analyst F. P. Santangelo did not work games from April 30 to May 2, after the Nationals informed the Mid-Atlantic Sports Network of an anonymous allegation of sexual misconduct by Santangelo that was posted on Instagram, The Washington Post reported. After MASN completed its investigation, Santangelo returned to the booth for games on May 4 and May 5 and was scheduled to participate in a YouTube broadcast of the May 6 game, although he did not appear. On May 7, the Nationals formally revoked their consent for Santangelo to appear on broadcasts, although MASN allowed him to participate in that evening's broadcast. Nationals representatives intercepted Santangelo as he arrived for the next day's broadcast from Nationals Park and turned him away at the parking garage, according to the Post. The Athletic published a story by former Nationals beat reporter Brittany Ghiroli later that day, on May 8, detailing the anonymous accuser's allegations against Santangelo. The Nationals announced that evening that Santangelo had been taken off the air at the team's insistence, first in April after the initial allegation and then again after MASN's investigation when additional allegations surfaced. MASN said it had referred the matter to Major League Baseball for investigation. Santangelo did not participate in broadcasts of Nationals games through the All-Star Break.

Santangelo denied the allegations. He said the misconduct claimed in The Athletic was "untrue and did not happen". The MLB investigation did not find evidence corroborating the allegations, and MASN announced on July 16 that following MLB and the network's review, Santangelo's credentials had been restored, and he returned to the broadcast that night.

While Santangelo was on leave, former Nationals outfielder Justin Maxwell was brought on to provide color commentary during MASN broadcasts. Kolko and 106.7 The Fan radio host Grant Paulsen were also used as fill-in color analysts.
