= 2020 Washington Nationals season =

2020 Washington Nationals
- League: National League
- Division: East
- Ballpark: Nationals Park
- City: Washington, D.C.
- Record: 26–34 (.433)
- Divisional place: 5th
- Owners: Lerner Enterprises
- General managers: Mike Rizzo
- Managers: Dave Martinez
- Television: MASN (Bob Carpenter, FP Santangelo, Dan Kolko, Bo Porter)
- Radio: 106.7 The Fan; Washington Nationals Radio Network (Charlie Slowes, Dave Jageler)

The 2020 Washington Nationals season was the Nationals' 16th season as the baseball franchise of Major League Baseball in the District of Columbia, the 13th season at Nationals Park, and the 52nd season since the original team was started in Montreal, Quebec, Canada. The team entered this season as the defending World Series champions.

On March 12, 2020, MLB announced that due to the COVID-19 pandemic, the start of the regular season would be delayed by at least two weeks in addition to the remainder of spring training being canceled. Four days later, it was announced that the start of the season would be pushed back indefinitely due to CDC recommendation.

Players returned to training camps on July 1 to resume spring training and prepare for a July 23 Opening Day. On September 19, the team suffered its 31st loss, assuring them of finishing the season with a losing record, their first since 2011.

On September 22 in game 2 of a doubleheader, the Nationals would get their 4,000th regular season win in franchise history on a walk-off home run by Yadiel Hernández to beat the Phillies 8–7. On September 24, the Nationals were eliminated from playoff contention, making them the 20th defending champion unable to win consecutive titles. The Nationals finished the regular season with a record of 26–34, giving them a fourth place finish in the National League East as a result of the Nationals' 6–4 head-to-head against the Mets, who also finished 26–34 (.433). The Nationals' .433 winning percentage was the second lowest of all time among defending champion seasons, behind only the 1998 Florida Marlins, who went 54–108 (.333).

== Offseason ==
=== Team news ===
The day after the Washington Nationals won the 2019 World Series on October 30, 2019, in Houston, Texas, nine members of that championship team officially filed for free agency: pitchers Jeremy Hellickson, Daniel Hudson, Fernando Rodney, and Jonny Venters; infielders Asdrúbal Cabrera, Brian Dozier, Howie Kendrick, and Anthony Rendon; and outfielder Gerardo Parra. On November 1, the Nationals announced they would not exercise their share of the 2020 mutual option for first baseman Matt Adams, making Adams a free agent as well. The Nationals also declined club options over first baseman Ryan Zimmerman and catcher Yan Gomes, who also became free agents, on November 2. They exercised club options to keep pitcher Sean Doolittle and outfielder Adam Eaton under contract for the 2020 season. Hellickson chose to retire instead of pursuing another career opportunity, citing a reoccurring shoulder injury.

There was media speculation around whether the Nationals would re-sign Rendon, who was a finalist in National League Most Valuable Player balloting, and Stephen Strasburg, who was the World Series MVP. Washington general manager Mike Rizzo expressed public interest in bringing back both players, who rejected one-year qualifying offers from the Nationals. However, in an early-December interview with Donald Dell, Nationals principal owner Mark Lerner said the club "can only afford to have one of those two guys", downplaying the possibility that both could fit into Washington's 2020 payroll. On December 9, 2019, at the annual winter meetings in Strasburg's hometown of San Diego, the Nationals announced they had come to terms with Strasburg on a new, seven-year deal, reported to be worth $245 million, a record for a free agent pitcher. (Note: Strasburg's deal held the record only briefly before the New York Yankees signed free agent Gerrit Cole to a nine-year, $324 million deal later that month. (See Footer, Alison, "Strasburg to Nationals on record 7-year deal", MLB.com, December 9, 2019 and "'I've Always Been Here': Cole Speaks Glowingly Of Yankees During Introductory Press Conference", CBSNewYork, December 18, 2019)) At the press conference making the announcement, Rizzo also confirmed that the Nationals had re-signed Kendrick to what was reported as a one-year major league deal. Kendrick's signing was officially announced the following day, along with the re-signing of Gomes to a two-year deal. The team also re-signed Zimmerman and Cabrera to one-year major league deals and brought back Hudson on a two-year guarantee. Rendon ultimately signed with the Los Angeles Angels on a seven-year deal.

The Nationals were also linked in media reports to other free agents, including first baseman Justin Smoak (ultimately signed by the Milwaukee Brewers), third basemen Josh Donaldson (ultimately signed by the Minnesota Twins) and Maikel Franco (ultimately signed by the Kansas City Royals), along with starting pitchers Madison Bumgarner (ultimately signed by the Arizona Diamondbacks) and Zack Wheeler (ultimately signed by the Philadelphia Phillies).

Eight Nationals were eligible for salary raises through the arbitration system during the offseason: pitchers Roenis Elías, Koda Glover, Javy Guerra, Joe Ross, and Hunter Strickland; infielders Wilmer Difo and Trea Turner; and outfielder Michael A. Taylor. The Nationals signed Strickland and Difo to new one-year contracts. Hours before the deadline for teams to tender new contracts to arbitration-eligible players, on December 2, Glover announced his retirement from professional baseball at age 26. The Nationals tendered contracts to all eligible players except Glover and Guerra, who were non-tendered, although Guerra later re-signed with the Nationals on a minor league pact. The Nationals agreed to one-year contracts for each of their tendered players, avoiding arbitration.

A few days later, the Nationals signed a new reliever, former Oakland Athletics minor league closer Kyle Finnegan. Finnegan was the first free agent signing of the offseason announced by the team, on December 8, 2019. The Nationals added to their bullpen again on January 3, 2020, announcing they had signed veteran Will Harris to a three-year contract. On January 29, the team acquired reliever Ryne Harper from the Minnesota Twins.

The Nationals added new positions player to their roster as well, announcing the signings of infielders Starlin Castro to a two-year deal and Eric Thames to a one-year deal on January 7 and 8, respectively.

=== Transactions ===
- November 20, 2019: The Nationals selected the contract of left-handed pitcher Ben Braymer from the Class-AAA Fresno Grizzlies.
- December 1, 2019: The Nationals signed infielder Wilmer Difo to a one-year major league contract.
- December 2, 2019: The Nationals signed right-handed reliever Hunter Strickland to a one-year major league contract and declined to offer arbitration to right-handed relievers Koda Glover and Javy Guerra; Glover retired and Guerra elected free agency.
- December 8, 2019: The Nationals signed right-handed reliever Kyle Finnegan to a major league contract.
- December 9, 2019: The Nationals signed right-handed starting pitcher Stephen Strasburg to a seven-year major league contract.
- December 10, 2019: The Nationals signed catcher Yan Gomes to a two-year major league contract and infielder Howie Kendrick to a one-year major league contract with a mutual option.
- December 12, 2019: The Nationals lost minor league pitcher Sterling Sharp to the Miami Marlins in the Rule 5 draft.
- January 3, 2020: The Nationals signed right-handed reliever Will Harris to a three-year major league contract.
- January 7, 2020: The Nationals signed infielder Starlin Castro to a two-year major league contract.
- January 8, 2020: The Nationals signed infielder Asdrúbal Cabrera to a one-year major league contract and first baseman and outfielder Eric Thames to a one-year major league contract with a mutual option.
- January 14, 2020: The Nationals signed right-handed reliever Daniel Hudson to a two-year major league contract.
- January 28, 2020: The Nationals signed first baseman Ryan Zimmerman to a one-year major league contract and signed infielder/outfielder Emilio Bonifácio to a minor league contract with an invitation to spring training.
- January 29, 2020: The Nationals acquired right-handed reliever Ryne Harper from the Minnesota Twins for minor league pitcher Hunter McMahon.
- July 22, 2020: The Nationals selected the contracts of infielder/outfielder Emilio Bonifácio, right-handed pitcher Javy Guerra, and left-handed pitcher Sam Freeman from the alternate training site.

=== Spring training ===
The Nationals held spring training at their facility at FITTEAM Ballpark of the Palm Beaches in West Palm Beach, Florida, which they share with the Houston Astros. It was their fourth year at the facility.

On February 12, the Nationals announced they had invited the following players on minor league contracts to participate in major league spring training: left-handed pitchers Fernando Abad and Sam Freeman; right-handed pitchers Dakota Bacus, Bryan Bonnell, Wil Crowe, Paolo Espino, Jhonatan Germán, Javy Guerra, David Hernandez, Kevin Quackenbush, and Derek Self; catchers Welington Castillo, Taylor Gushue, and Jakson Reetz; infielders Luis García Jr., Drew Ward, and Jacob Wilson; outfielders Yadiel Hernández and Mac Williamson; infielder/outfielders Emilio Bonifácio and Brandon Snyder; and outfielder/left-handed pitcher J. B. Shuck.

On March 12, the remainder of spring training was canceled due to the coronavirus pandemic. The Nationals had a record of 6–11–2 before this happened. When the new schedule was announced for the 2020 season, it included three new exhibition games against the Phillies and Orioles, which count as Spring Training games.

== Regular season ==
=== Opening Day ===
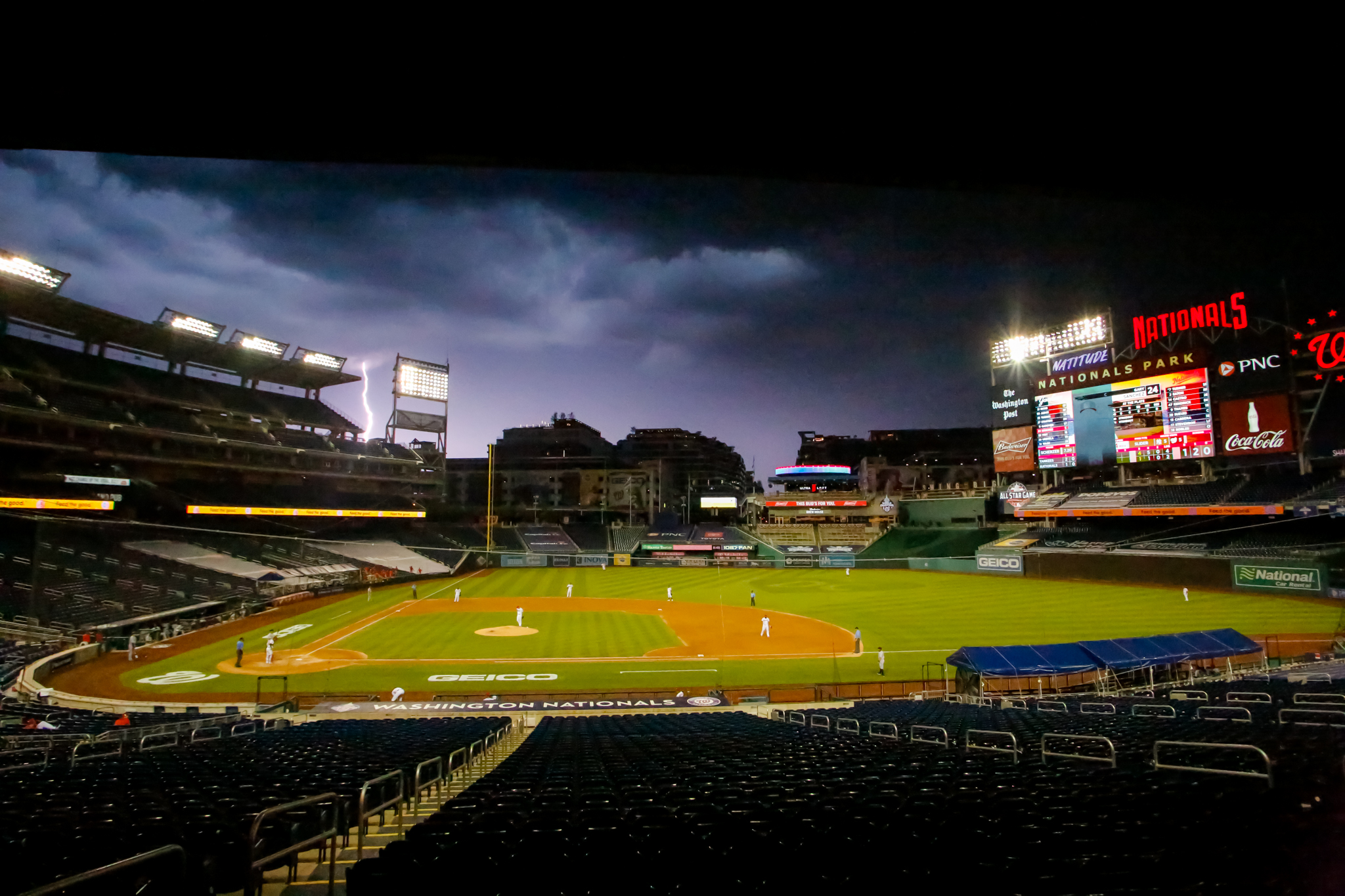
Opening Day on July 23 at the empty Nationals Park

The Nationals' season started out with Juan Soto, their starting left fielder and co-recipient of the 2019 Babe Ruth Award, testing positive for COVID-19 and being placed on the injured list hours before first pitch on Opening Day on July 23 versus the New York Yankees. Despite testing negative on follow-up rapid testing, Soto was unable to participate in baseball activities due to MLB and District of Columbia health protocols.

In the first game of the season the Nationals were held to one run—a solo home run from right fielder Adam Eaton—by Yankees ace Gerrit Cole, whom they had beaten twice during the 2019 World Series, before heavy rains forced the game to be called midway through the sixth inning. Nationals starter Max Scherzer gave up all four of New York's runs in the loss, three of them batted in by Yankees slugger Giancarlo Stanton.

==== Opening Day lineup ====
Opening Day Starters
Name	Position
Trea Turner	Shortstop
Adam Eaton	Right field
Starlin Castro	Second base
Howie Kendrick	Designated hitter
Eric Thames	First base
Kurt Suzuki	Catcher
Asdrúbal Cabrera ^{[a]}	Third base
Andrew Stevenson	Left field
Víctor Robles	Center field
Max Scherzer	Pitcher

^{^[a]}Juan Soto tested positive for COVID-19 and thus was placed on the IL.

=== Season standings ===
==== National League East ====
NL East
Team	W	L	Pct.	GB	Home	Road
Atlanta Braves	35	25	.583	—	19‍–‍11	16‍–‍14
Miami Marlins	31	29	.517	4	11‍–‍15	20‍–‍14
Philadelphia Phillies	28	32	.467	7	19‍–‍13	9‍–‍19
Washington Nationals	26	34	.433	9	15‍–‍18	11‍–‍16
New York Mets	26	34	.433	9	12‍–‍17	14‍–‍17

==== National League Wild Card ====
Division leaders
Team	W	L	Pct.
Los Angeles Dodgers	43	17	.717
Atlanta Braves	35	25	.583
Chicago Cubs	34	26	.567

Division 2nd place
Team	W	L	Pct.
San Diego Padres	37	23	.617
St. Louis Cardinals	30	28	.517
Miami Marlins	31	29	.517

Wild Card teams (Top 2 teams qualify for postseason)
Team	W	L	Pct.	GB
Cincinnati Reds	31	29	.517	+2
Milwaukee Brewers	29	31	.483	—
San Francisco Giants	29	31	.483	—
Philadelphia Phillies	28	32	.467	1
Washington Nationals	26	34	.433	3
New York Mets	26	34	.433	3
Colorado Rockies	26	34	.433	3
Arizona Diamondbacks	25	35	.417	4
Pittsburgh Pirates	19	41	.317	10

=== Record vs. opponents ===
2020 National League record Source: MLB Standings Grid – 2020
Team	ATL	MIA	NYM	PHI	WSH	AL
Atlanta	—	6–4	7–3	5–5	6–4	11–9
Miami	4–6	—	4–6	7–3	6–4	10–10
New York	3–7	6–4	—	4–6	4–6	9–11
Philadelphia	5–5	3–7	6–4	—	7–3	7–13
Washington	4–6	4–6	6–4	3–7	—	9–11

=== July ===
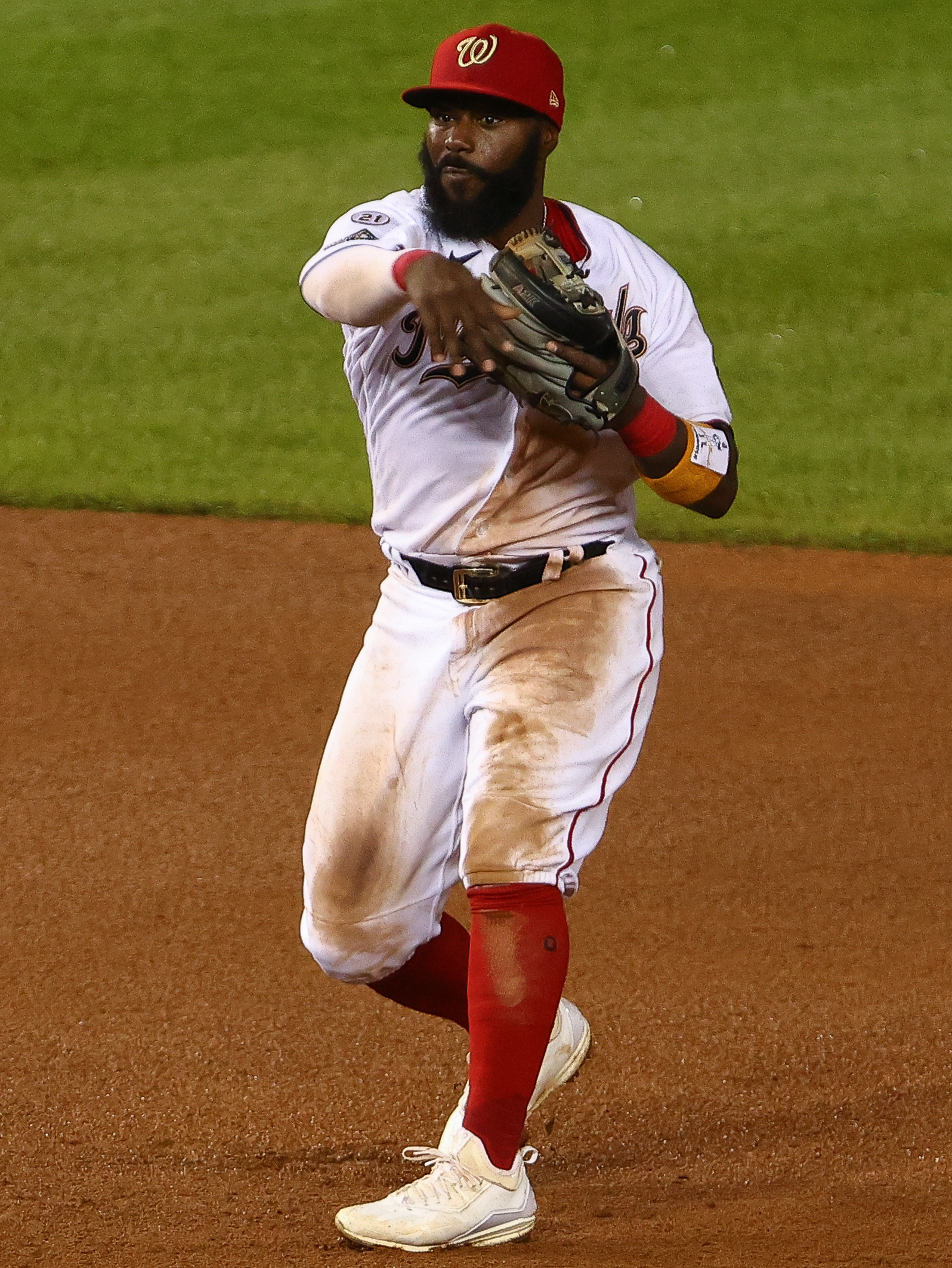
The Nationals signed Josh Harrison on July 27 after he was released by the Philadelphia Phillies.

After dropping their first game of the season and losing outfielder Juan Soto to the injured list with a positive COVID-19 test, the Nationals' woes continued as ace Stephen Strasburg, the reigning World Series MVP, was scratched from his first start on July 25 with a nerve issue in his throwing hand. Erick Fedde stepped in as the July 25 starter versus the New York Yankees, contributing four innings in a 9–2 victory for Washington. The Nationals knocked out Yankees starter James Paxton in the second inning. Center fielder Víctor Robles had three hits, including a two-run double off Paxton and a two-run home run off the left field foul pole against reliever Mike King. Tanner Rainey picked up the win in relief with a scoreless inning. Kyle Finnegan made his major league debut with a scoreless ninth inning for the Nationals. Despite an outstanding 6 1/3 innings of work from starter Patrick Corbin in the rubber game on July 26, the Nationals didn't get much offense going against the Yankees despite an early home run off Jonathan Loaisiga from shortstop Trea Turner. After Corbin allowed a seventh-inning home run to Gleyber Torres, his only run given up and just his second baserunner allowed, manager Davey Martinez removed him from the game in favor of Will Harris, making his Nationals debut after signing a three-year contract early in the offseason. Harris gave up a game-tying solo home run by Luke Voit. Nationals reliever Sean Doolittle took the loss as Torres knocked in another run on a single in the eighth inning and Zack Britton shut the door for New York.

On July 27, the Nationals signed Josh Harrison to a one-year deal and added him directly to the major league roster, optioning extra catcher Raudy Read to the alternate training site in Fredericksburg, Virginia. Nationals starter Aníbal Sánchez surrendered four solo home runs over five innings, taking the 4–1 loss, as the Nationals opened an interleague series against the Toronto Blue Jays later that day. With former National Tanner Roark starting for the Blue Jays in the second game of the home-and-home series, the Nationals again managed to scratch out just one run, with second baseman Starlin Castro committing two fielding errors that contributed to three unearned runs of five scored by the Blue Jays in the game. Washington's starter, Austin Voth, gave up two earned runs over five innings for the loss. With Canadian coronavirus protocols preventing the Blue Jays from playing home games in Toronto and improvements to Sahlen Field, their temporary home in Buffalo, New York, still under construction, Nationals Park hosted the Blue Jays as the "home team" for the next two games. The first of the two, July 29, was also the first test for the Nationals of a rule adopted for the 2020 season under which a baserunner starts each half-inning of extra innings on second base. Neither team managed to score over the first nine innings behind excellent starts for the Nationals' Max Scherzer and Blue Jays rookie Nate Pearson, sending the game into extra innings. Right fielder Adam Eaton finally broke the tie for the Nationals in the tenth inning with a two-out infield single that scored runner Emilio Bonifácio. The Nationals went on to win 4–0, with third baseman Asdrúbal Cabrera tripling home three more runs that inning before Rainey won the game for the "home" team in the bottom of the tenth. The Nationals won again on July 30, also as the "away" team in their own ballpark, as Castro went 4-for-5 and left fielder Michael A. Taylor hit a two-run homer off Toronto starter Hyun-jin Ryu in the 6–4 contest. Fedde started again in place of Strasburg, but it was reliever Ryne Harper who earned the win, his first as a National, as Fedde was pulled in the fourth inning after giving up two runs. Nationals closer Daniel Hudson locked down his first save of the campaign.

The Nationals were set to have their first roadtrip of the season starting July 31, visiting the division-rival Miami Marlins, but the series was postponed after several Marlins players and personnel tested positive for COVID-19. They finished July with a 3–4 record, third in the National League East Division.

=== August ===
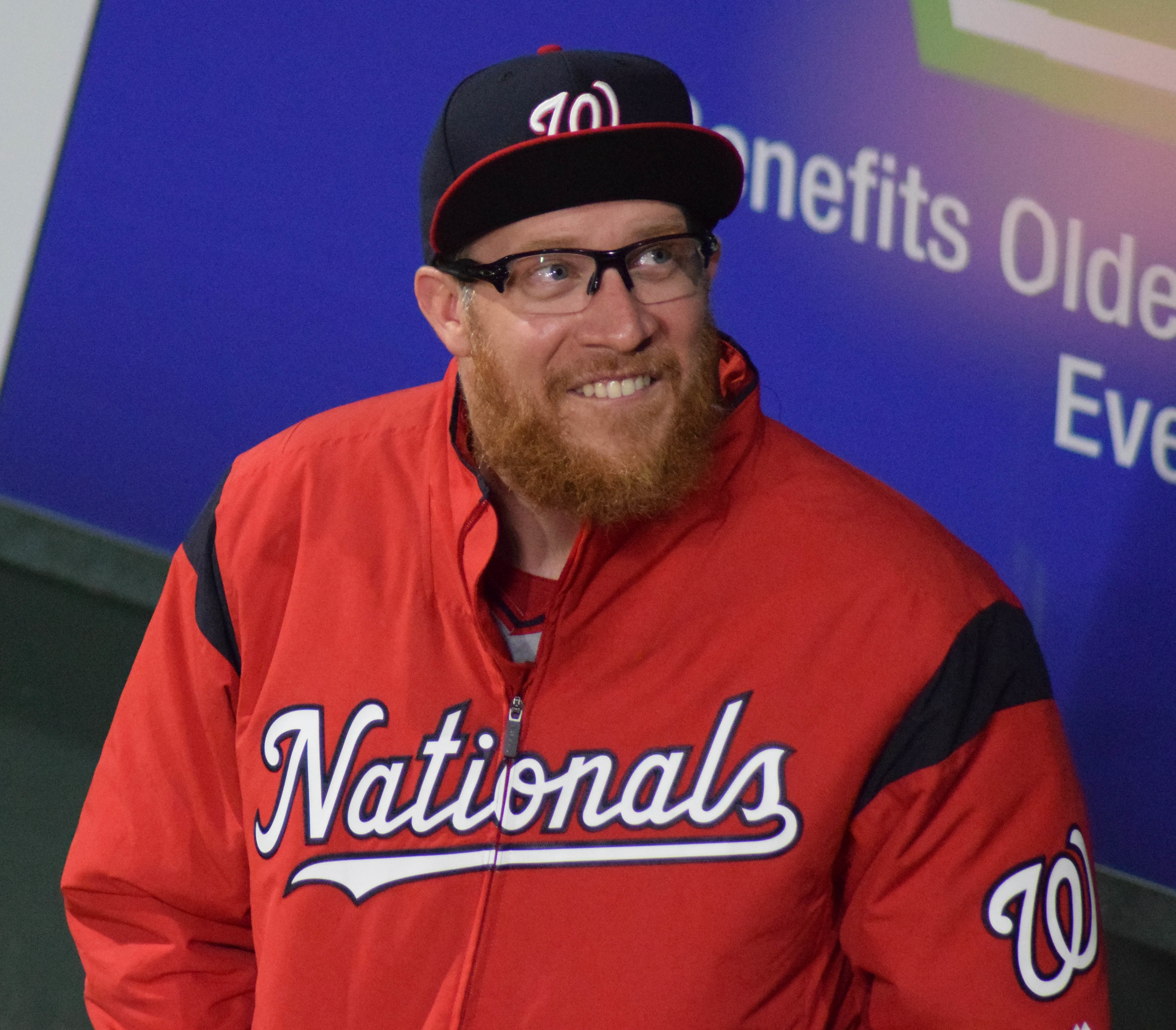
In his fourth season with the Nationals, reliever Sean Doolittle (pictured in 2019) struggled both to stay healthy and to retire batters.

After opening August with three straight days off due to the Miami Marlins' positive COVID-19 tests and a scheduled off day, the Nationals returned to action with a 5–3 win over the division-rival New York Mets at Nationals Park on August 4. Left fielder Juan Soto was activated after missing time following his own positive COVID-19 test, although he did not play in the August 4 game. The Nationals also activated reliever Wander Suero after placing Harris on the injured list with a right flexor strain. Outfielder Andrew Stevenson was optioned to the alternate training site. In the August 4 game, first baseman Howie Kendrick went 4-for-4, beginning with a first-inning home run off Mets starter Steven Matz. Left fielder Josh Harrison recorded his first hit of the season with a second-inning home run off Matz. Starting pitcher Patrick Corbin got the win despite allowing three runs over 5 2/3 innings. After their return to action, however, the Nationals' failed to get their offense going. Behind Rick Porcello, the Mets pulled out a series split by winning 3–1 on August 5. Max Scherzer started the game for the Nationals but exited with a hamstring issue after just one inning of work, replaced by Erick Fedde, who went on to take the loss in relief. Making his season debut, Soto drove in the Nationals' only run of the game with an RBI double off Porcello.

Rosters contracted to 28 players on August 6 after starting the season at 30 players, and the Nationals chose to option reliever James Bourque and Emilio Bonifácio for assignment to trim their roster down to size. After another off day, the Nationals lost two games to their interleague rivals, the Baltimore Orioles, including an 11–0 drubbing in which former National Tommy Milone earned the win as the Orioles' starter on August 7. The Nationals led 3–0 into the eighth inning on August 8, but Sean Doolittle gave up back-to-back home runs to trim Baltimore's deficit before closer Daniel Hudson allowed a three-run home run by Anthony Santander for the blown save and loss. In Stephen Strasburg's season debut for the final game of the three-game set on August 9, the Nationals' struggles manifested themselves in a new way, as the game was postponed in the sixth inning when the Nationals Park grounds crew was unable to unroll the tarp over the infield in time for heavy rains to render the field unplayable for the rest of the night.

The Nationals rebounded from three straight losses with a 16–4 drubbing of the Mets on August 10, as first baseman Asdrúbal Cabrera went 4-for-4 with two home runs against his former team and Soto clubbed a home run 463 feet (141 m) beyond the apple sculpture in straightaway center at Citi Field, the longest of his career. Corbin earned the win, giving up two runs in six innings. The Nationals followed that rout up with another win on August 11, as Scherzer and the Nationals avenged their earlier defeat by Porcello and the Mets. Shortstop Trea Turner opened the game for the Nationals with a home run off Porcello, who took the loss, while Scherzer earned the win with six strong innings in the 2–1 contest. The Mets rallied, however, to split the four-game series by winning the next two games. In the August 12 game, they overcame two more Soto home runs, including a 466 foot (142 m)-blast that landed in the vacant concessions area high in the right field stands, by scoring five early to chase Nationals starter Aníbal Sánchez in the third inning and then thumping reliever Ryne Harper for five more in the sixth inning. The Nationals had to take two players out of the game: starting center fielder Víctor Robles, who was hit on the hand by a pitch, and left-handed reliever Sam Freeman, who suffered an elbow injury. Before the August 13 game, the Nationals moved both Freeman and Doolittle, dealing with a right knee issue, to the injured list. They selected the contract of left-hander Seth Romero, one of their top pitching prospects, and activated Harris to fill the blank spots in the bullpen. The Mets won 8–2, getting to Nationals starter Austin Voth early and forcing manager Davey Martinez to go to his bullpen starting in the fifth inning. Voth took the loss, but many of the runs were allowed by Romero, making his major league debut in relief, as New York catcher Tomás Nido hit a two-out grand slam to center field to give New York a large lead.. Soto hit his fourth home run of the series in the sixth inning, but the damage was done and the Mets cruised to a win.

Because of the season's modified rules, when the Nationals resumed the interrupted August 9 game against the Orioles on August 14, they did so as the "home" team at Oriole Park at Camden Yards, proceeding to a loss. Reliever Dakota Bacus, called up to give the Nationals a fresh bullpen arm while Harper was optioned, made his debut in the continued game with two shutout innings. While the 6–2 finish marked the second time of the month the Nationals had lost three games in a row, they suffered another loss as second baseman Starlin Castro dove for a ball and broke his wrist, sending him to the injured list for the remainder of the season. To replace Castro on the roster and as the team's starting second baseman, the Nationals called up top prospect Luis García Jr. from the alternate training site, selecting his contract for a major league debut in that evening's game, played as a regular home game for the Orioles. Both García and fellow rookie infielder Carter Kieboom starred in the 15–3 win, with García singling off Baltimore's starter Milone in the third inning for his first career hit and later doubling in Soto and Cabrera for his first RBIs while Kieboom, the starting third baseman in the game, flashed the leather with 10 assists, many of them while playing in a defensive shift, to set a new team record for assists by a third baseman. (Note: "Carter Kieboom breaks Ryan Zimmerman's single-game record for assists by a Nats third baseman". NBC Sports. August 14, 2020. Archived from the original on March 2, 2021. The previous record was held by Ryan Zimmerman, with eight.) h|However, the Nationals starting pitcher Strasburg exited the game after giving up a Santander home run and recording just two outs. Strasburg was later moved to the injured list and ultimately shut down for the season with carpal tunnel neuritis in his throwing hand, with Harper recalled to take his place on the roster. The Nationals and Orioles split the next two games at Oriole Park at Camden Yards, with Corbin suffering his first loss of the season on August 15 as he allowed five runs over five innings before the Nationals rebounded to a 6–5 win behind Scherzer in the series finale the next day. Scherzer got the win despite allowing five runs over seven innings, with two solo home runs by Santander and a three-run home run by Scherzer's former catcher and Nationals teammate, Pedro Severino, as Soto scored on a fielding error in the eighth inning.

Another scheduled three-game series was shortened to two games by rain, but not before the Nationals split the first two with the division-rival Atlanta Braves. The Braves pinned another blown save and loss on Hudson, struggling in his role as Washington's closer, with a walk-off home run by Dansby Swanson capping a four-run rally in the ninth inning of the August 17 game, with a final score of 7–6. Also in this game was García's first career home run, as he became the first player born in the 2000s to hit a major league home run, with a two-run shot in the second inning off Touki Toussaint. Hudson returned from the loss to complete the save and complete a 8–5 win for the Nationals on August 18, credited to Suero in relief after Voth was tagged for five runs over four innings. Romero, Bacus, Harris, Javy Guerra, and Kyle Finnegan also provided scoreless relief appearances in the game. The August 19 game was postponed by rain.

After playing the rival Marlins after an earlier series was postponed by COVID-19, the Nationals lost three of five at Nationals Park, including a makeup "away" game played as part of an August 22 doubleheader. Returning after his recovery from COVID-19, shortstop Miguel Rojas led the offense for the Marlins in a 3–2 Nationals loss on August 21, sending a three-run homer to left field off Corbin in the second inning. The Nationals split the doubleheader on August 22, winning as the home team in the matinee—while Scherzer struggled and departed in the fifth inning with the bases loaded, Finnegan struck out catcher Jorge Alfaro to end the inning and earned his first career win—and losing in the nightcap, as prospect Wil Crowe, selected from the alternate training site to start the game for the Nationals, was removed from the game in the fourth inning and ultimately tagged for four runs as the reliever Romero let in two inherited runners. Making his own major league debut, opposing starter Sixto Sánchez gave up three runs over five innings, on home runs by Nationals catcher Yan Gomes and center fielder Robles, but earned the win. Aníbal Sánchez finally earned his first win of the season on August 23, giving up just one run over seven innings. Miami turned to right-hander Sterling Sharp, a Nationals prospect whom the Marlins had claimed in the 2019 Rule 5 draft, in relief after starter Humberto Mejía was chased in the fourth inning. The Nationals hit Sharp hard in the fifth inning, scoring five runs off him. The Marlins designated Sharp for assignment after the game and returned him to the Nationals. Washington made its own roster move in the bullpen on August 24, with Romero out for the season after breaking his right hand in a fall on the stairs, according to manager Davey Martinez; he was placed on the injured list and fellow southpaw Ben Braymer was called up from the alternate training site. The Marlins had a game, with Voth again being pummeled to the tune of seven runs allowed over 3 2/3 innings. The Nationals attempted to comeback but couldn't complete it, with the Marlins winning 11–8 despite a 4-for-5 effort from Soto and four RBIs by Eaton.

For their third three-game losing streak of August, as well as their third scheduled three-game series of August truncated to two, the Nationals dropped games on August 25 and 26 to the division-rival Philadelphia Phillies before the August 27 game was postponed. The Phillies hit off of Fedde well in the series opener, which the Nationals lost 8–3 after a lengthy rain delay, despite another leadoff home run by Turner. It was the bullpen that was the cause of the loss on August 26. Although Doolittle returned to the roster to take the place of third baseman Carter Kieboom as Kieboom was optioned to the alternate training site, the relievers couldn't withstand a Phillies rally as Harris gave up the tying and go-ahead runs in the seventh inning, not helped by an outfield collision between Robles and Eaton. The scheduled August 27 game was postponed, as players from the Phillies and the Nationals boycotted due to the shooting of Jacob Blake in Kenosha, Wisconsin, earlier that week.

On a roadtrip to Fenway Park to play an interleague series with the Boston Red Sox, the Nationals started off with an 10–2 win behind Scherzer on August 28. Braymer made his major league debut in relief, giving up one run over two innings before being optioned back to the alternate training site after the Nationals signed former longtime Red Sox utilityman Brock Holt to a major league deal on August 29. But Washington finished out the month on yet another three-game losing streak, as the Red Sox took the next two games by handing losses to Sánchez and Voth, and Fedde in Philadelphia on August 31 allowed six runs over six innings for another loss.

Overall, the Nationals went 9–16 in August and finished the month in last place in the National League East Division.

=== September ===
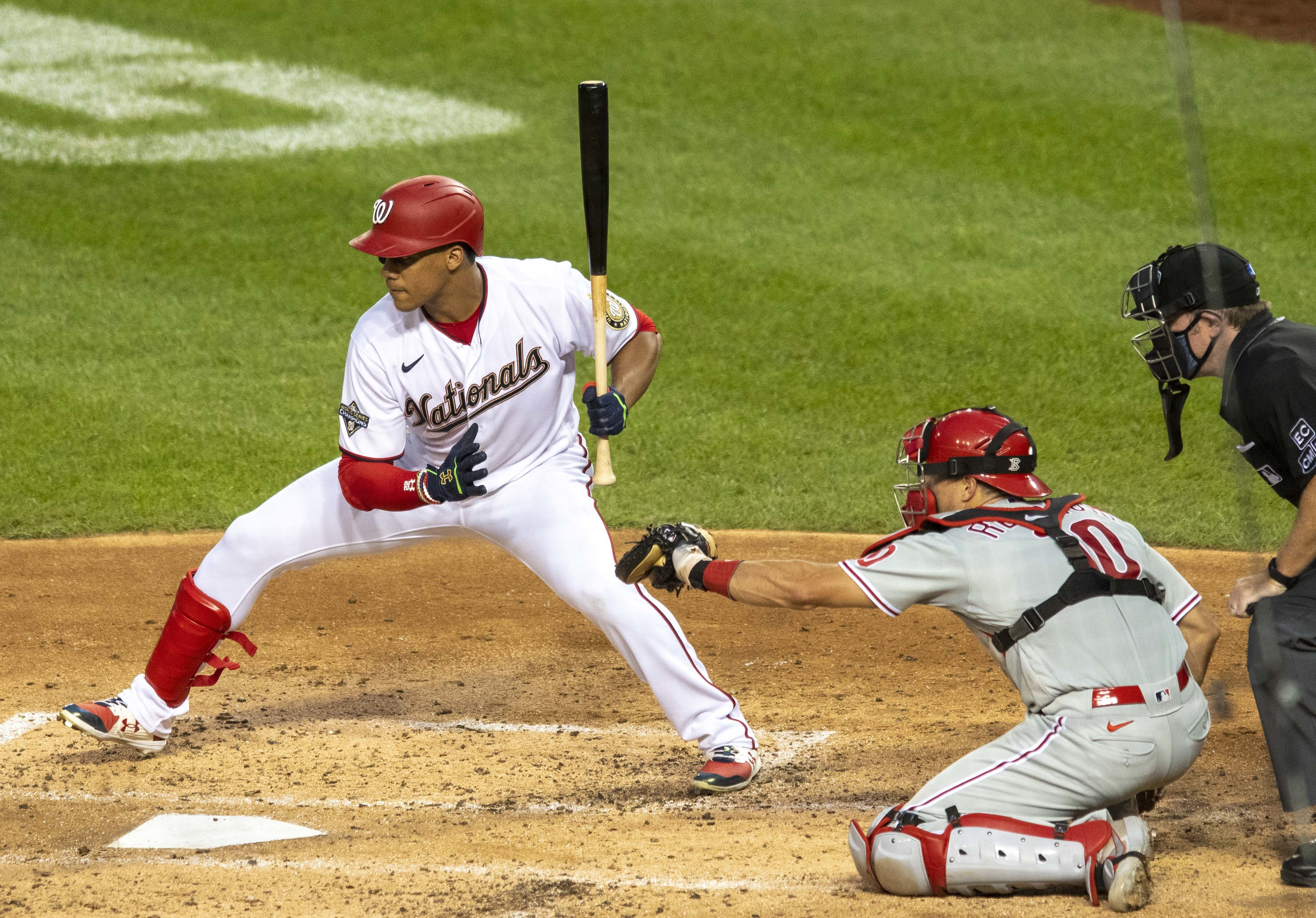
Juan Soto, pictured doing his signature "shuffle" in the batter's box, clinched his first career batting title on September 27.

September started poorly for the Nationals, whose losing streak extended to seven games as they were swept by the division-rival Philadelphia Phillies and lost their first of four games against the rival Atlanta Braves. They were then shut out by the Phillies on September 1 and 2 before pushing the September 3 game to extra innings before losing 6–5 in the tenth. The Nationals struggled against Phillies ace Aaron Nola on September 1, as they lost in the 6–0 shutout. After Nola threw eight innings and held Nationals' Trea Turner and Juan Soto went hitless, Nationals manager Davey Martinez admitted it was the best performance he had yet seen from Nola. It was Max Scherzer's turn to pitch on September 2, with Zack Wheeler leading the Phillies' 3–0 shutout of the Nationals. Scherzer allowed three runs over six innings for the loss, receiving no run support. In this game, Nationals reliever Javy Guerra suffered a hamstring injury in relief of Corbin and landed on the injured list the next day, with the Nationals recalling Kyle McGowin to replace him in the bullpen. While the Nationals started to get their offensense going on September 3, aided by an inside-the-park home run by Turner and an over-the-fence home run by Michael A. Taylor, reliever Daniel Hudson failed to save the game in the eighth inning and Sean Doolittle took the loss as the Phillies scored their automatic runner in the bottom of the tenth.

The Nationals lost the first game in a doubleheader at Truist Park in Atlanta on September 4, as the bats again went quiet and fifth starter Austin Voth again imploded, giving up five runs, including two home runs by Ronald Acuña Jr., in 4 2/3 innings en route to a 7–1 loss. To make matters worse, the Nationals scratched Soto with elbow soreness and sat fellow outfielder Adam Eaton with a knee injury he had suffered the previous night. While still missing their usual corner outfielders, and turning again to rookie starting pitcher Wil Crowe for the spot start in the nightcap, the Nationals pulled out a 10–9 win. Crowe was lifted from the game in the third inning, having struggled with command and given up two home runs, including Acuña's third of the day. Reliever Tanner Rainey, the Nationals' most reliable arm all season, surrendered a grand slam to Freddie Freeman to tie the game in the fourth inning. Led by Turner, the Nationals scored just enough runs to win, as struggling closer Daniel Hudson gave up a two-run home run but still earned the save. The Nationals recalled third baseman Carter Kieboom on September 5, designating longtime utilityman Wilmer Difo for assignment in a corresponding move. "We've got to see what we've got," manager Davey Martinez explained, describing Kieboom—despite his struggles at the plate before he was optioned to the alternate training site in late August—as his everyday third baseman for the rest of the season. The bullpen and offense came through again in the September 5 game, with McGowin making his season debut and throwing 2 1/3 perfect innings, earning the win and picking up another lackluster start by Fedde, who allowed all four of the Braves' runs as the Nationals again scored ten times. Also that day, the Nationals announced a contract extension for general manager Mike Rizzo through the 2023 season. Corbin struggled again on September 6 and took the loss as the Braves salvaged a series split, giving up five runs and exiting after 5 1/3 innings, as it was Atlanta's turn to put up ten runs to three for the Nationals. In a highly unusual move, Rizzo was ejected during the game by umpire Joe West after, West claimed, the Nationals general manager showered verbal abuse on the umpiring crew from his suite two levels above home plate over a questionable call.

After placing rookie reliever Dakota Bacus on the injured list, the Nationals recalled reliever James Bourque. The Nationals swept the Tampa Bay Rays in a two-game interleague set on September 7 and 8. Scherzer pitched well in the series opener, putting up seven strong innings as the Nationals prevailed 6–1. The second game was more competitive, but the Nationals won 5–3, aided by Soto's return to the lineup, Kieboom's first extra-base hit of the season (an RBI double), and perfect innings of relief from Doolittle and Rainey. The two-game sweep was tempered as veteran infielder Howie Kendrick landed on the injured list with a nagging hamstring injury, with the Nationals selecting the contract of 32-year-old minor league outfielder Yadiel Hernández from the alternate training site to replace him.

Rainey's revival didn't last long, as he took the loss on September 10 when the Braves clawed back from a five-run deficit before Dansby Swanson gave them the lead with an eighth-inning home run. Making matters worse, the Nationals lost Doolittle to another injury in the ninth inning. Done for the season, Doolittle was placed on the injured list with an oblique injury, and the Nationals recalled left-hander Ben Braymer to the bullpen. Following another blown save for Hudson that sent the game into extra innings, Bourque earned his first major league win pitching in relief for the Nationals on September 11, coming on in the twelfth inning after scoreless tenth and eleventh innings authored by Kyle Finnegan. Taylor delivered the walk-off single for Washington to cap the seesaw 8–7 affair. The Braves took the four-game series by winning the next two games, with Corbin allowing just two runs over seven innings on September 12 but getting just one run of support and Scherzer getting clobbered for six runs over 5 1/3 innings on September 13 to take the loss.

The Nationals split a pair with the Rays at Tropicana Field. Playing without Rainey, out for the season with a right flexor strain, and utilityman Brock Holt, out for the birth of his second child, and with reliever Aaron Barrett and infielder Jake Noll up from the alternate training site to replace them, the Nationals were pummeled 6–1 on September 15 as Aníbal Sánchez gave up all of the Rays' runs in 4 1/3 innings. They recovered to win in extra innings the next day, with Luis García Jr. hitting a game-winning home run 427 feet (130 m) into right field in the tenth after another blown save by Hudson.

The Miami Marlins and Nationals had some games to make up from earlier in the season due to the Marlins' COVID-19 outbreak, so a five-game series that included two doubleheaders in three days was scheduled. The Nationals won the first and last games of the five-game set, shutting out the Marlins 5–0 behind a strong start from Erick Fedde, who allowed just one hit over six innings, in the matinee on September 18 and then shutting them out again 15–0 in the nightcap on September 20, with Braymer earning his first career win thanks to an effective five-inning spot start and ample run support. Sandwiched in between, the Marlins came back to crush Crowe and the Nationals' bullpen in a 15–3 blowout in the night game on September 18, which ended with a returning Holt coughing up a three-run homer to Brian Anderson in his major league pitching debut; hammering Corbin for a career-high 14 hits allowed and sending him to yet another loss in a 7–3 game on September 19, the only nine-inning game of the series under the 2020 season's doubleheader rules; and winning the first game in the September 20 doubleheader, a tough 2–1 loss for Scherzer, with the go-ahead run scoring on a Kieboom throwing error, despite a strong pitching performance for the Nationals' longtime ace.

The Nationals beat the Phillies on September 21 behind a five-inning start from Sánchez and four scoreless innings from the bullpen, although they lost Kieboom for the season when he was hit on the hand by a pitch, suffering a bone bruise. Playing their third doubleheader in the span of less than a week, the Nationals swept both games against Philadelphia on September 22, with Voth earning his first win of the season in the matinee and the 32-year-old rookie Hernández hitting his first major league home run to walk off in the nightcap, as journeyman Paolo Espino made the spot start for the Nationals. The Phillies exacted a small measure of revenge, savaging the Nationals 12–3 and handing Fedde the loss on September 23, despite Fedde posting his longest outing of the year at seven innings while giving up three runs, two of them on home runs by former Nationals teammate and fellow Las Vegas native Bryce Harper. After McGowin and Ryne Harper struggled in relief, Holt took the ball for his second pitching appearance of the season. The Nationals were formally eliminated that night from playoff contention.

Finishing the season with four games against the division-rival New York Mets, with whom they were now battling for fourth place in the National League East Division, the Nationals dropped the series opener on September 24 as Corbin lost his seventh straight decision. To catch the Mets in the standings and finish out of last place in the division, by dint of a better head-to-head record, the Nationals had to win out—and they did, starting by winning yet another doubleheader on September 26 following a rainout. Harris notched his first save with the Nationals in the first game of two on September 26, securing the 4–3 win for Scherzer. The Nationals were propelled by an unlikely offensive powerhouse. Starting in left field and leading off for the Nationals, with Soto moving over to right field, Andrew Stevenson hit two home runs off Mets ace and reigning Cy Young Award winner Jacob deGrom, including an inside-the-park home run in the fifth inning as Mets left fielder Dominic Smith ran into a wall and couldn't get up quickly. In the second game of the doubleheader, Sánchez received support in the form of a five-run third inning that gave the Nationals all the offense they needed to win, 5–3. The Nationals punctuated the season in emphatic fashion on September 27, winning 15–5 and giving Voth his second win of the season. Turner hit a grand slam off Mets starter Steven Matz in the game, while Soto singled to secure the National League batting title, the youngest qualifying player ever to lead the league in hits over a season.

Despite a rough start to September, the Nationals managed a 14–14 record of wins and losses over the month, bringing them to a 26–34 season record that was good for a fourth-place finish in the National League East, one year after earning a wild card berth into the playoffs and winning the 2019 World Series.

=== Notable transactions ===
- July 27, 2020: The Nationals signed infielder/outfielder Josh Harrison to a one-year major league contract.
- August 6, 2020: The Nationals designated infielder/outfielder Emilio Bonifácio for assignment; he elected free agency.
- August 13, 2020: The Nationals selected the contract of left-handed pitcher Seth Romero from the alternate training site.
- August 14, 2020: The Nationals selected the contracts of right-handed pitcher Dakota Bacus and infielder Luis García Jr. from the alternate training site.
- August 22, 2020: The Nationals selected the contract of right-handed pitcher Wil Crowe from the alternate training site.
- August 27, 2020: The Nationals acquired minor league pitcher Sterling Sharp from the Miami Marlins for cash considerations.
- August 29, 2020: The Nationals signed infielder/outfielder Brock Holt to a one-year major league contract.
- September 5, 2020: The Nationals signed general manager Mike Rizzo to a three-year contract extension. The Nationals also designated infielder Wilmer Difo for assignment; he was outrighted to the alternate training site.
- September 10, 2020: The Nationals selected the contract of outfielder Yadiel Hernández from the alternate training site.
- September 26, 2020: The Nationals signed manager Dave Martinez to a three-year contract extension. (Note: The length of Martinez's new deal was announced only as a "multi-year" extension, but media reports and unofficial statements from members of the Nationals organization described it as a three-year contract beginning with the 2021 season.)

=== Major league debuts ===
- July 25, 2020: Kyle Finnegan
- August 13, 2020: Seth Romero
- August 14, 2020: Dakota Bacus, Luis García Jr.
- August 22, 2020: Wil Crowe
- August 28, 2020: Ben Braymer
- September 10, 2020: Yadiel Hernández

NOTE: Dakota Bacus's debut took place in the August 14 continuation of the suspended August 9 game. In baseball records, his debut technically appears as having occurred in the August 9 game.

== Game log ==
2020 game log: 26–34 (Home: 15–18; Away: 11–16)
July: 3–4 (Home: 3–4; Away: 0–0)

#	Date	Opponent	Score	Win	Loss	Save	Record
1	July 23	Yankees	1–4 (6)	Cole (1–0)	**Scherzer** (0–1)	—	0–1
2	July 25	Yankees	9–2	**Harper** (1–0)	Paxton (0–1)	—	1–1
3	July 26	Yankees	2–3	Green (1–0)	**Doolittle** (0–1)	Britton (1)	1–2
4	July 27	Blue Jays	1–4	Borucki (1–0)	**Sánchez** (0–1)	Bass (1)	1–3
5	July 28	Blue Jays	1–5	Roark (1–0)	**Voth** (0–1)	—	1–4
6	July 29	@ Blue Jays (Played at Nationals Park) (Note: This game counts as a home game in the statistics, despite the Nationals batting first and being designated as the road team)	4–0	**Hudson** (1–0)	Yamaguchi (0–2)	—	2–4
7	July 30	@ Blue Jays (Played at Nationals Park)	6–4	**Harper** (2–0)	Ryu (0–1)	**Hudson** (1)	3–4
—	July 31	@ Marlins	Postponed (COVID-19); Makeup: August 22 as part of a doubleheader at Nationals Park				

August: 9–16 (Home: 3–9; Away: 6–7)

#	Date	Opponent	Score	Win	Loss	Save	Record
—	August 1	@ Marlins	Postponed (COVID-19); Makeup: September 18 as part of a doubleheader				
—	August 2	@ Marlins	Postponed (COVID-19); Makeup: September 20 as part of a doubleheader				
8	August 4	Mets	5–3	**Corbin** (1–0)	Matz (0–2)	**Hudson** (2)	4–4
9	August 5	Mets	1–3	Porcello (1–1)	**Fedde** (0–1)	Lugo (2)	4–5
10	August 7	Orioles	0–11	Milone (1–1)	**Sánchez** (0–2)	—	4–6
11	August 8	Orioles	3–5	Armstrong (1–0)	**Hudson** (1–1)	Castro (1)	4–7
—	August 9	Orioles	Suspended (field issues). (Note: The Nationals field crew had issues getting the tarp on the field during a rain delay with the Orioles leading 5–2 with 1 out in the top of 6th inning and runners on 1st & 2nd.) Completed on August 14.				
12	August 10	@ Mets	16–4	**Corbin** (2–0)	Matz (0–3)	—	5–7
13	August 11	@ Mets	2–1	**Scherzer** (1–1)	Porcello (1–2)	**Hudson** (3)	6–7
14	August 12	@ Mets	6–11	Familia (1–0)	**Sánchez** (0–3)	—	6–8
15	August 13	@ Mets	2–8	Peterson (3–1)	**Voth** (0–2)	—	6–9
16	August 14	Orioles (Note: Completion of game suspended on August 9. This was played at Oriole Park at Camden Yards before the regularly scheduled Nationals @ Orioles game.)	2–6	Lakins (2–0)	**Strasburg** (0–1)	—	6–10
17	August 14	@ Orioles	15–3	**Fedde** (1–1)	Milone (1–2)	—	7–10
18	August 15	@ Orioles	3–7	Wojciechowski (1–2)	**Corbin** (2–1)	Sulser (5)	7–11
19	August 16	@ Orioles	6–5	**Scherzer** (2–1)	Lakins (2–1)	**Hudson** (4)	8–11
20	August 17	@ Braves	6–7	Smith (2–0)	**Hudson** (1–2)	—	8–12
21	August 18	@ Braves	8–5	**Suero** (1–0)	Matzek (2–2)	**Hudson** (5)	9–12
—	August 19	@ Braves	Postponed (rain); Makeup: September 4 as part of a doubleheader				
22	August 21	Marlins	2–3	Hernández (1–0)	**Corbin** (2–2)	Kintzler (4)	9–13
23	August 22 (1)	Marlins	5–4 (7)	**Finnegan** (1–0)	Castano (0–2)	**Hudson** (6)	10–13
24	August 22 (2)	@ Marlins (Played at Nationals Park)	3–5 (7)	Sánchez (1–0)	**Crowe** (0–1)	Kintzler (5)	10–14
25	August 23	Marlins	9–3	**Sánchez** (1–3)	Mejía (0–2)	—	11–14
26	August 24	Marlins	8–11	López (3–1)	**Voth** (0–3)	Kintzler (6)	11–15
27	August 25	Phillies	3–8	Arrieta (2–3)	**Fedde** (1–2)	—	11–16
28	August 26	Phillies	2–3	Nola (3–2)	**Harris** (0–1)	Workman (6)	11–17
—	August 27	Phillies	Postponed (strikes due to shooting of Jacob Blake); Makeup: September 22 as part of a doubleheader				
29	August 28	@ Red Sox	10–2	**Scherzer** (3–1)	Pérez (2–4)	—	12–17
30	August 29	@ Red Sox	3–5	Brasier (1–0)	**Sánchez** (1–4)	Barnes (3)	12–18
31	August 30	@ Red Sox	5–9	Osich (1–1)	**Voth** (0–4)	—	12–19
32	August 31	@ Phillies	6–8	Howard (1–1)	**Fedde** (1–3)	—	12–20

September: 14–14 (Home: 9–5; Away: 5–9)

#	Date	Opponent	Score	Win	Loss	Save	Record
33	September 1	@ Phillies	0–6	Nola (4–2)	**Corbin** (2–3)	—	12–21
34	September 2	@ Phillies	0–3	Wheeler (4–0)	**Scherzer** (3–2)	Workman (8)	12–22
35	September 3	@ Phillies	5–6 (10)	Parker (3–0)	**Doolittle** (0–2)	—	12–23
36	September 4 (1)	@ Braves	1–7 (7)	O'Day (3–0)	**Voth** (0–5)	—	12–24
37	September 4 (2)	@ Braves	10–9 (7)	**Suero** (2–0)	Smith (2–1)	**Hudson** (7)	13–24
38	September 5	@ Braves	10–4	**McGowin** (1–0)	Matzek (3–3)	—	14–24
39	September 6	@ Braves	3–10	Tomlin (2–2)	**Corbin** (2–4)	—	14–25
40	September 7	Rays	6–1	**Scherzer** (4–2)	Morton (1–2)	**Hudson** (8)	15–25
41	September 8	Rays	5–3	**Sánchez** (2–4)	Yarbrough (0–3)	**Hudson** (9)	16–25
42	September 10	Braves	6–7	Martin (1–1)	**Rainey** (1–1)	Melancon (9)	16–26
43	September 11	Braves	8–7 (12)	**Bourque** (1–0)	Dayton (2–1)	—	17–26
44	September 12	Braves	1–2	Anderson (3–0)	**Corbin** (2–5)	Melancon (10)	17–27
45	September 13	Braves	4–8	Wright (1–4)	**Scherzer** (4–3)	—	17–28
46	September 15	@ Rays	1–6	Yarbrough (1–3)	**Sánchez** (2–5)	Anderson (5)	17–29
47	September 16	@ Rays	4–2 (10)	**Hudson** (2–2)	Anderson (1–1)	**McGowin** (1)	18–29
48	September 18 (1)	@ Marlins	5–0 (7)	**Fedde** (2–3)	Sánchez (3–2)		19–29
49	September 18 (2)	@ Marlins	3–14 (7)	García (3–0)	**Crowe** (0–2)	—	19–30
50	September 19	@ Marlins	3–7	López (5–4)	**Corbin** (2–6)	—	19–31
51	September 20 (1)	@ Marlins	1–2 (7)	Alcántara (3–2)	**Scherzer** (4–4)	Kintzler (10)	19–32
52	September 20 (2)	@ Marlins	15–0 (7)	**Braymer** (1–0)	Garrett (1–1)	—	20–32
53	September 21	Phillies	5–1	**Sánchez** (3–5)	Wheeler (4–1)	—	21–32
54	September 22 (1)	Phillies	5–1 (7)	**Voth** (1–5)	Nola (5–4)	—	22–32
55	September 22 (2)	Phillies	8–7 (8)	**Hudson** (3–2)	Workman (1–4)	—	23–32
56	September 23	Phillies	3–12	Eflin (4–2)	**Fedde** (2–4)	—	23–33
57	September 24	Mets	2–3	Peterson (6–2)	**Corbin** (2–7)	Díaz (6)	23–34
–	September 25	Mets	Postponed (rain); Makeup: September 26 as part of a doubleheader				
58	September 26 (1)	Mets	4–3 (7)	**Scherzer** (5–4)	Castro (2–2)	**Harris** (1)	24–34
59	September 26 (2)	Mets	5–3 (7)	**Sánchez** (4–5)	Porcello (1–7)	**Hudson** (10)	25–34
60	September 27	Mets	15–5	**Voth** (2–5)	Lugo (3–4)	—	26–34

Legend: = Win = Loss = Postponement
Bold = Nationals team member

== Roster ==
2020 Washington Nationals
Roster
Pitchers: 71 Dakota Bacus; 32 Aaron Barrett; 64 James Bourque; 70 Ben Braymer; 46 Patrick Corbin; 57 Wil Crowe; 63 Sean Doolittle; 52 Paolo Espino; 23 Erick Fedde; 67 Kyle Finnegan; 39 Sam Freeman; 48 Javy Guerra; 33 Ryne Harper; 36 Will Harris; 44 Daniel Hudson; 61 Kyle McGowin; 21 Tanner Rainey; 96 Seth Romero; 19 Aníbal Sánchez; 31 Max Scherzer; 37 Stephen Strasburg; 51 Wander Suero; 50 Austin Voth	Catchers: 10 Yan Gomes; 28 Kurt Suzuki; Infielders: 13 Asdrúbal Cabrera; 14 Starlin Castro; 1 Wilmer Difo; 62 Luis García Jr.; 5 Josh Harrison; 27 Brock Holt; 47 Howie Kendrick; 8 Carter Kieboom; 18 Jake Noll; 9 Eric Thames; 7 Trea Turner	Outfielders: 27 Emilio Bonifácio; 2 Adam Eaton; 29 Yadiel Hernández; 16 Víctor Robles; 22 Juan Soto; 17 Andrew Stevenson; 3 Michael A. Taylor	Manager: 4 Dave Martinez; Coaches: 35 Henry Blanco (bullpen); 24 Tim Bogar (bench); 12 Chip Hale (third base); 15 Bob Henley (first base); 54 Kevin Long (hitting); 87 Octavio Martinez (bullpen catcher); 59 Paul Menhart (pitching); 66 Pat Roessler (assistant hitting)

== Statistics ==
=== Batting ===
Note: G = Games played; AB = At bats; R = Runs scored; H = Hits; 2B = Doubles; 3B = Triples; HR = Home runs; RBI = Runs batted in; AVG = Batting average; OBP = On-base percentage; SLG = Slugging percentage; SB = Stolen bases

Player	G	AB	R	H	2B	3B	HR	RBI	AVG	OBP	SLG	SB
Yan Gomes	30	109	14	31	6	1	4	13	.284	.319	.468	1
Eric Thames	41	123	10	25	5	0	3	12	.203	.300	.317	1
Luis García Jr.	40	134	18	37	6	0	2	16	.276	.302	.366	1
Trea Turner	59	233	46	78	15	4	12	41	.335	.394	.588	12
Carter Kieboom	33	99	15	20	1	0	0	9	.202	.344	.212	0
Juan Soto	47	154	39	54	14	0	13	37	.351	.490	.695	6
Víctor Robles	52	168	20	37	5	1	3	15	.220	.293	.315	4
Adam Eaton	41	159	22	36	11	1	4	17	.226	.285	.384	3
Howie Kendrick	25	91	11	25	4	0	2	14	.275	.320	.385	0
Asdrúbal Cabrera	52	190	23	46	9	3	8	31	.242	.305	.447	0
Kurt Suzuki	33	111	15	30	8	0	2	17	.270	.349	.396	1
Michael A. Taylor	38	92	11	18	6	0	5	16	.196	.253	.424	0
Josh Harrison	33	79	11	22	2	0	3	14	.278	.352	.418	1
Brock Holt	20	65	11	17	6	0	0	4	.262	.314	.354	1
Starlin Castro	16	60	9	16	3	1	2	4	.267	.302	.450	0
Andrew Stevenson	15	41	11	15	7	1	2	12	.366	.447	.732	2
Yadiel Hernández	12	26	3	5	3	0	1	6	.192	.214	.423	0
Wilmer Difo	12	14	1	1	0	0	0	1	.071	.222	.071	0
Jake Noll	7	17	2	6	1	0	0	0	.353	.353	.412	0
Emilio Bonifácio	3	3	1	3	0	0	0	0	.000	.000	.000	0
Team totals	60	1968	293	519	112	12	66	279	.264	.336	.433	33

=== Pitching ===
Note: W = Wins; L = Losses; ERA = Earned run average; G = Games pitched; GS = Games started; SV = Saves; IP = Innings pitched; H = Hits allowed; R = Runs allowed; ER = Earned runs allowed; HR = Home runs allowed; BB = Walks allowed; K = Strikeouts

Player	W	L	ERA	G	GS	SV	IP	H	R	ER	HR	BB	K
Max Scherzer	5	4	3.74	12	12	0	67.1	70	30	28	10	23	92
Patrick Corbin	2	7	4.66	11	11	0	65.2	85	35	34	10	18	60
Aníbal Sánchez	4	5	6.62	11	11	0	53.0	70	40	39	11	18	43
Erick Fedde	2	4	4.29	11	8	0	50.1	47	25	24	10	22	28
Austin Voth	2	5	6.34	11	11	0	49.2	57	36	35	14	18	44
Daniel Hudson	3	2	6.10	21	0	10	20.2	15	15	14	6	11	28
Kyle Finnegan	1	0	2.92	25	0	0	24.2	21	10	8	2	13	27
Ryne Harper	1	0	7.61	23	0	3	23.2	29	21	20	5	9	25
Wander Suero	2	0	3.80	22	0	0	23.2	20	10	10	1	10	28
Tanner Rainey	1	1	2.66	20	0	0	20.1	8	6	6	4	7	32
Will Harris	0	1	3.06	20	0	1	17.2	21	9	6	3	9	21
Javy Guerra	0	0	4.02	14	0	0	15.2	19	7	7	2	7	13
Dakota Bacus	0	0	7.94	11	0	0	11.1	14	10	10	1	9	7
Kyle McGowin	1	0	4.91	9	0	1	11.0	9	6	6	2	5	16
Wil Crowe	0	2	11.88	3	3	1	8.1	14	13	11	5	8	8
Sean Doolittle	0	2	5.87	11	0	0	7.2	9	6	5	3	4	4
Ben Braymer	1	0	1.23	3	1	0	7.1	7	1	1	0	5	8
Paolo Espino	0	0	4.50	2	1	0	6.0	8	3	3	1	2	7
Stephen Strasburg	0	1	10.80	2	2	0	5.0	8	6	6	1	1	2
Sam Freeman	0	0	1.80	7	0	0	5.0	2	1	1	0	7	6
James Bourque	1	0	6.75	6	0	0	4.0	3	3	3	1	5	1
Seth Romero	0	0	13.50	3	0	0	2.2	5	4	4	1	3	5
Aaron Barrett	0	0	10.80	2	0	0	1.2	2	2	2	0	2	1
Brock Holt	0	0	13.50	2	0	0	1.1	5	2	2	1	0	0
Team totals	26	34	5.09	60	60	12	503.2	548	301	285	94	216	508

== Awards and honors ==
Outfielder Juan Soto won the batting title among qualified National League players, hitting .351 during the regular season to beat out Atlanta Braves first baseman Freddie Freeman and become the youngest NL batting champion in history. Soto also won a Silver Slugger Award.

== Farm system ==
Level	Team	League	Manager
AAA	Fresno Grizzlies	Pacific Coast League	Randy Knorr
AA	Harrisburg Senators	Eastern League	Billy Gardner Jr.
A-Advanced	Fredericksburg Nationals	Carolina League	Tripp Keister
A	Hagerstown Suns	South Atlantic League	Mario Lisson
A-Short Season	Auburn Doubledays	New York–Penn League	Patrick Anderson
Rookie	GCL Nationals	Gulf Coast League	Rocket Wheeler
Rookie	DSL Nationals	Dominican Summer League	Sandy Martínez

=== Class A-Advanced ===
After playing for 36 seasons at Pfitzner Stadium in Woodbridge, Virginia, the Nationals' Class A-Advanced affiliate, most recently known as the Potomac Nationals, moved during the 2019–2020 offseason to a new stadium in Fredericksburg, Virginia, that would open in April 2020. On October 5, 2019, the team announced that it had changed its name to the Fredericksburg Nationals for the 2020 season and that its marketing nickname for the team – "P-Nats" when the team was the Potomac Nationals – had changed to "FredNats."
