= Yadi =

Yadi may refer to:

- Yadi, Iran, a village in Shavur District, Shush County, Khuzestan Province, Iran
- Yadi Qardash, a village in Central District, Germi County, Ardabil Province, Iran
- Yadier Molina (born 1982), Puerto Rican baseball player
- Reda Yadi (born 1963), Algerian swimmer
- Yadi Sakat, Siddi general who captured the Sewri Fort in Mumbai in 1689
- Yadi Sugandi, Indonesian cinematographer and director of the 2009 film Merah Putih
- Yadi Timo, Indonesian television actor in the soap opera Wulan
- Ade Yadi, Indonesian footballer in the club Persikas Subang
- Yadi, nickname for the personal name Yadier
- Yadi Bangoura (born 1996), Guinean footballer in the Belgian club SC Eendracht Aalst
- Yadi Mulyadi (born 2002), Indonesian player on the Indonesia national under-17 football team
- Yadi Sopian, Indonesian medalist in chess at the 2015 ASEAN Para Games

== See also ==
- Yadi Yadi, a 1995 EP by Australian singer-songwriter Anita Lane
- Yaadi, a spelling variant of Yardie
- Yaddi Bolagh (disambiguation), several people
