= Yadiel =

Yadiel is a given name. Notable people with the name include:

- Yadiel Hernández (born 1987), Cuban baseball player
- Yadiel Rivera (born 1992), Puerto Rican baseball player

== See also ==
- Yadier
