= Seth Romero =

American baseball player (born 1996)

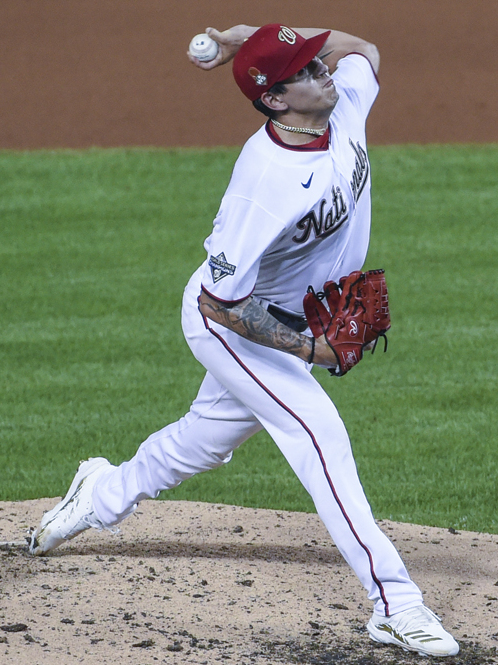
- Romero with the Washington Nationals in 2020
- Pitcher
- Born: April 19, 1996 (age 30); West Columbia, Texas, U.S.
- Batted: Left Threw: Left

MLB debut
- August 13, 2020, for the Washington Nationals

Last MLB appearance
- August 22, 2020, for the Washington Nationals

MLB statistics
- Win–loss record: 0–0
- Earned run average: 13.50
- Strikeouts: 5
- Stats at Baseball Reference

Teams
- Washington Nationals (2020)

Seth Daniel Romero (born April 19, 1996) is an American former professional baseball pitcher. He played for the Washington Nationals of Major League Baseball (MLB) during the 2020 season. He played college baseball for the University of Houston Cougars and was drafted by the Nationals in the first round of the 2017 MLB draft.

== Amateur career ==
Romero attended Columbia High School in West Columbia, Texas. As a senior, he had a 1.35 earned run average (ERA) with 131 strikeouts over 62 innings. He was not drafted coming out of high school and attended the University of Houston where he played college baseball for the Cougars.

As a freshman at Houston in 2015, Romero appeared in 22 games and made eight starts. He had a 7–4 record with a 1.94 ERA, 92 strikeouts and seven saves. Prior to his sophomore season in 2016, he was suspended indefinitely for "conduct detrimental to the team", described in media reports as poor physical conditioning. He returned from the suspension after missing two starts, crediting his weight loss to the work of Houston strength and conditioning coach Ryan Deatrick, and appeared in 15 games with 13 starts. He finished 6–4 with a 2.29 ERA and 113 strikeouts.

As a junior in April 2017, Romero was suspended by the team for a second time, reportedly after failing a drug test, missing curfew, and being photographed in uniform holding a bong. At the time of the suspension, he was 3–3 with a 3.03 ERA and was leading the nation with 76 strikeouts. He was re-instated in May. However, Romero played just two games after being reinstated before he was dismissed from the team. The Houston Chronicle reported Romero had been involved in a fight with a teammate, precipitating his final dismissal from the team after a series of previous disciplinary incidents.

== Professional career ==
=== Washington Nationals ===
The Washington Nationals selected Romero with 25th overall choice in the 2017 MLB draft. He signed with the team on July 7, reportedly accepting an over-slot $2.8 million signing bonus. While the Nationals' scouting director said he believed Romero's "stuff" could immediately be effective in Major League Baseball, the team's general manager, Mike Rizzo, said he did not expect Romero to make his major league debut in the 2017 season. Romero was assigned to the GCL Nationals, and after one scoreless appearance, was promoted to the Auburn Doubledays where he posted a 5.40 ERA with 32 strikeouts in 20 innings to finish the season.

Ranked as the fifth-best Nationals prospect before the 2018 season, Romero was placed on the Nationals' early camp roster for spring training that year. However, he was ordered to leave camp on March 5 for reportedly violating team policy. On June 6, he was reinstated and assigned to the Hagerstown Suns of the Single–A South Atlantic League. However, Romero made just seven starts and saw his season end early as he underwent Tommy John surgery at the end of August 2018.

Romero did not play in the 2019 season. On June 28, 2020, the Nationals announced he would be a non-roster member of their 60-man "player pool" for the coronavirus-shortened 2020 season. After placing left-handed reliever Sean Doolittle on the injured list on August 13, 2020, the Nationals selected Romero's contract and promoted him to the major league roster for a game against the New York Mets. Romero appeared in just three games at the major league level, pitching to a 13.50 ERA out of the Nationals' bullpen, before being placed on the injured list with a broken right hand suffered in an off-field accident; the Nationals said Romero had fallen on the stairs. Romero bounced around the Nationals' minor league system in 2021, pitching 35 2/3 innings across four levels without making it back to the major leagues.

In January 2022, he was arrested for driving while intoxicated in Sweeny, Texas. Romero was placed on the 60-day injured list on April 7, 2022, with a left calf strain. He began a rehab assignment on August 24 with the rookie–level Florida Complex League Nationals. He was activated from the injured list on August 27 and optioned to the Double–A Harrisburg Senators. Romero was released by the Nationals on November 14, 2022, after he was again arrested in Sweeny for driving while intoxicated and possession of a controlled substance.

=== Cleburne Railroaders ===
On May 7, 2024, Romero signed with the Cleburne Railroaders of the American Association of Professional Baseball. He made 2 appearances out of the bullpen, registering a 20.25 ERA with 7 strikeouts over 4 innings. On May 15, Romero was released by the Railroaders.

== Pitching style ==
Romero throws left-handed, with a fastball that sits at about 93 miles per hour (150 km/h). He also throws a slider regarded by scouts as "above-average", as well as a changeup. In college, he was known as a strikeout pitcher with solid command of his pitches. After drafting Romero, the Washington Nationals said publicly they planned to develop him as a starting pitcher rather than pressing him into a relief role.
