= Carter Kieboom =

American baseball player (born 1997)

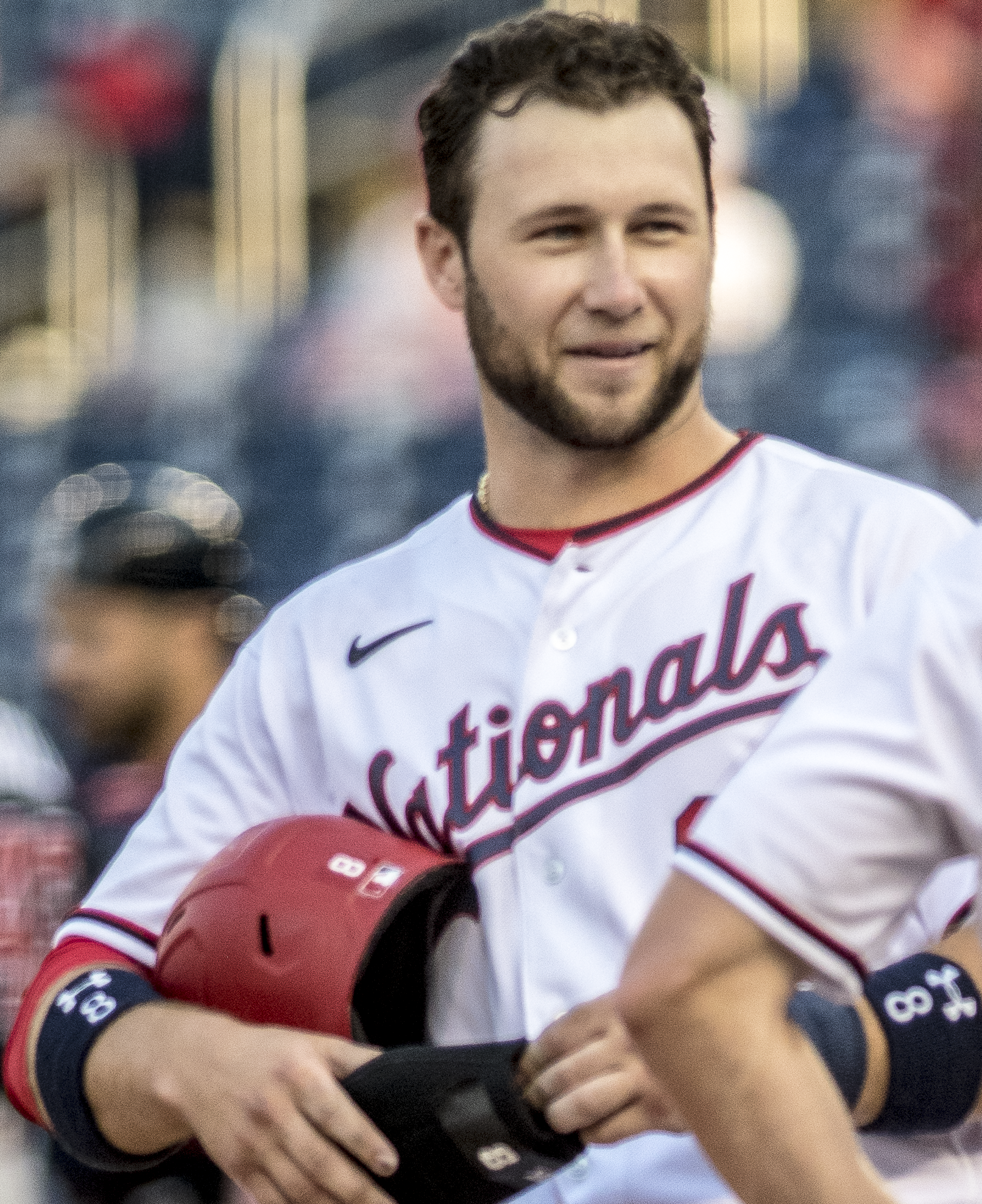
- Kieboom with the Washington Nationals in 2021

Free agent
- Third baseman / Shortstop
- Born: September 3, 1997 (age 29); Marietta, Georgia, U.S.
- Bats: Right Throws: Right

MLB debut
- April 26, 2019, for the Washington Nationals

MLB statistics (through 2025 season)
- Batting average: .200
- Home runs: 12
- Runs batted in: 43
- Stats at Baseball Reference

Teams
- Washington Nationals (2019–2021, 2023); Los Angeles Angels (2025)

Carter Alswinn Kieboom (/ˈkiːbuːm/ KEE-boom; born September 3, 1997) is an American professional baseball third baseman who is a free agent. He has previously played in Major League Baseball (MLB) for the Washington Nationals and Los Angeles Angels. He made his MLB debut in 2019.

== Amateur career ==
Kieboom attended George Walton Comprehensive High School in Marietta, Georgia. He committed to attend Clemson University to play college baseball for the Clemson Tigers.

== Professional career ==
=== Washington Nationals ===
The Washington Nationals drafted Kieboom in the first round of the 2016 Major League Baseball draft. Kieboom announced he would sign with the Nationals on June 11. He spent that summer with the rookie-level Gulf Coast League Nationals where he batted .244 with four home runs and 25 RBIs. In 2017 with the Single-A Hagerstown Suns, he was hitting .333 and six home runs and 20 RBIs before a hamstring injury on May 12 placed him on the disabled list. Kieboom was named to the Northern Division All-Star team in the South Atlantic League. Both Baseball America and MLB Pipeline listed Kieboom as the Nationals' fourth-best prospect during the 2017 season. After returning to action late in the season, Kieboom played in six games with the GCL Nationals and seven games with the Low-A Auburn Doubledays before returning to Hagerstown. Across all three levels, he had a .297 batting average with nine home runs in 61 games for the 2017 season.

Playing for the High-A Potomac Nationals in 2018, Kieboom was named a Carolina League All-Star, one of six Potomac players so honored. In the All-Star Game, he hit a home run while going 3-for-5. He was promoted to the Double-A Harrisburg Senators for the first time following the All-Star Game, homering off Baltimore Orioles prospect Keegan Akin in his first game at the higher level on June 21. Representing Team USA, he was one of two Nationals minor league players, along with Dominican-raised infielder Luis García Jr. for Team World, selected to play in the All-Star Futures Game at Nationals Park in 2018.

Kieboom began the 2019 season with the Fresno Grizzlies of the Triple-A Pacific Coast League. On April 26, 2019, the Nationals purchased Kieboom's contract and promoted him to the major league roster for a series against the San Diego Padres. He made his debut that night and hit a home run for his first major league hit. Kieboom was named to the 2019 Futures Game. He played 11 games with the Nationals with a .128 average and 2 home runs. The Nationals finished the 2019 year 93–69, clinching a wild card spot and eventually winning the World Series over the Houston Astros. Kieboom did not participate in any postseason action.

Following the departure of veteran third baseman Anthony Rendon after the 2019 season, Nationals manager Dave Martinez said in January 2020 that Kieboom would move to third base full time, with the expectation that he would step in as Rendon's permanent replacement in the 2020 season. In the shortened 2020 season, Kieboom played in 33 games fo Washington, hitting .202/.344/.212 with no home runs and 9 RBI before ending his season early due to a left wrist contusion.

Kieboom played in 62 games in 2021, his most during his tenure with Washington. He hit .207 with 6 home runs. On March 20, 2022, it was announced that Kieboom would miss 4–6 weeks while recovering from a flexor mass strain near his right elbow, and he was placed on the 60-day injured list the following day. On May 20, it was announced that Kieboom would require Tommy John surgery and would miss the 2022 season. Kieboom began the 2023 season in extended spring training before being activated by the Rochester Red Wings of the Triple-A International League in May. He went on the injured list in June due to an oblique muscle injury. Kieboom hit a home run in his first at-bat while returning to the majors. In 26 games for Washington, he batted .207/.266/.368 with 4 home runs and 11 RBI.

On March 13, 2024, Kieboom was removed from the 40-man roster and sent outright to Triple-A Rochester. He played in 91 games for the Red Wings, slashing .265/.365/.386 with seven home runs and 42 RBI. Kieboom elected free agency following the season on November 4.

=== Los Angeles Angels ===
On December 6, 2024, Kieboom signed a minor league contract with the Los Angeles Angels. In 93 appearances for the Triple-A Salt Lake Bees in 2025, he batted .319/.368/.449 with nine home runs, 57 RBI, and 11 stolen bases. On September 16, the Angels added Kieboom him to their active roster. In three appearances for Los Angeles, he went 2-for-8 with one RBI. On October 22, Kieboom was removed from the 40-man roster and sent outright to Salt Lake; he subsequently rejected the assignment and elected free agency.

=== Philadelphia Phillies ===
On January 13, 2026, Kieboom signed a minor league contract with the Cleveland Guardians. On March 21, Kieboom was traded to the Philadelphia Phillies in exchange for cash considerations. In 107 games with Triple-A Lehigh Valley IronPigs he batted .270/.354/.388 with 7 home runs, 50 RBIs and one stolen base. He elected free agency on November 2.

== Personal life ==
Kieboom's brother, Spencer Kieboom, played for the Nationals in 2018. Their father was born in the Netherlands and played baseball on the Dutch junior national team and in the Honkbal Hoofdklasse.
