= Yaddi Bolagh =

Yaddi Bolagh or Yadi Bolagh or Yeddi Bolagh (Persian: يدي بلاغ), also rendered as Yadibulak and Yadibulaq, may refer to:

- Yaddi Bolagh, Ahar, East Azerbaijan Province
- Yeddi Bolagh, Meyaneh, East Azerbaijan Province
- Yaddi Bolagh, Zanjan
