= James Bourque (baseball) =

American baseball player (born 1993)

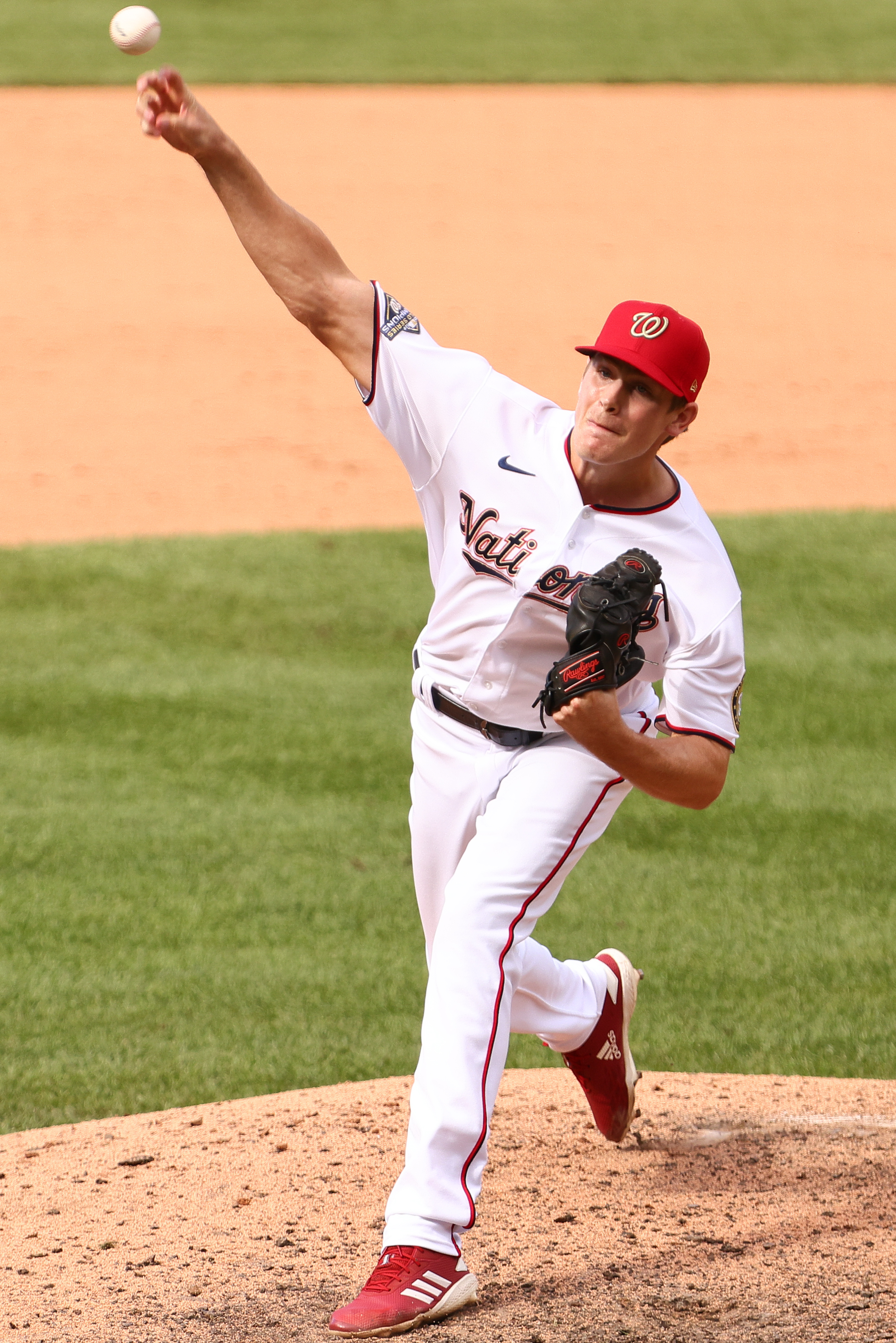
- Bourque with the Washington Nationals in 2020
- Pitcher
- Born: July 9, 1993 (age 33); Ann Arbor, Michigan, U.S.
- Batted: Right Threw: Right

MLB debut
- May 26, 2019, for the Washington Nationals

Last MLB appearance
- September 20, 2020, for the Washington Nationals

MLB statistics
- Win–loss record: 1–0
- Earned run average: 13.50
- Strikeouts: 1
- Stats at Baseball Reference

Teams
- Washington Nationals (2019–2020)

James Buchanan Bourque (born July 9, 1993) is an American former professional baseball pitcher. He played in Major League Baseball (MLB) for the Washington Nationals.

== Career ==
=== Washington Nationals ===
Bourque attended Huron High School in Ann Arbor, Michigan and played college baseball at the University of Michigan. He was drafted by the Washington Nationals in the 14th round of the 2014 Major League Baseball draft. He spent his first professional season with the Gulf Coast Nationals and Low-A Auburn Doubledays. Bourque missed the 2015 season after undergoing Tommy John surgery.

Bourque returned to action in 2016 with the Single–A Hagerstown Suns. In 17 games (13 starts), he logged a 5–6 record and 5.03 ERA with 55 strikeouts in 68 innings of work. Bourque spent the 2017 season back with Hagerstown, making 23 appearances (20 starts) and registering a 5–7 record and 5.07 ERA with 90 strikeouts in 113 2/3 innings pitched.

Prior to the 2018 season, the Nationals converted him from a starter into a relief pitcher. Bourque turned in a 1.70 ERA between the High-A Potomac Nationals and Double-A Harrisburg Senators, working exclusively in relief, and rocketed up the prospect charts to be ranked as the Nationals' 17th-best prospect by MLB.com midway through the 2018 season. On November 19, 2018, the Nationals added Bourque to their 40-man roster to protect him from the Rule 5 draft.

After Bourque pitched to a 1.33 ERA through 14 games with Double-A Harrisburg, the Nationals called him up on May 25, 2019, to replace Joe Ross in the bullpen. He made his major league debut the following game, pitching in the ninth inning against the Miami Marlins. On May 29,, Bourque was optioned to the Triple-A Fresno Grizzlies and spent the rest of the season there, going 4–1 with a 5.56 ERA over 43.2 innings.

In 2020, Bourque made six major league appearances for Washington, recording a 6.75 ERA with only one strikeout in four innings of work. He missed the latter part of the season due to an elbow strain, and was removed from the 40-man roster and sent outright to Triple–A on October 13, 2020. Bourque became a free agent on November 2.

=== Chicago Cubs ===
On December 18, 2020, Bourque signed a minor league contract with the Chicago Cubs organization. He missed the entire 2021 season due to injury, and made only 7 appearances for the Triple-A Iowa Cubs in 2022, logging a 3.24 ERA with 16 strikeouts in 8 1/3 innings pitched. Bourque elected free agency following the season on November 10, 2022.

=== San Diego Padres ===
On May 17, 2023, Bourque signed a minor league contract with the San Diego Padres organization. In 11 games for the Double–A San Antonio Missions, he recorded a 3.46 ERA with 18 strikeouts in 13.0 innings of work. On July 25, Bourque was released by San Diego.
