= Sterling Sharp =

American baseball player (born 1995)

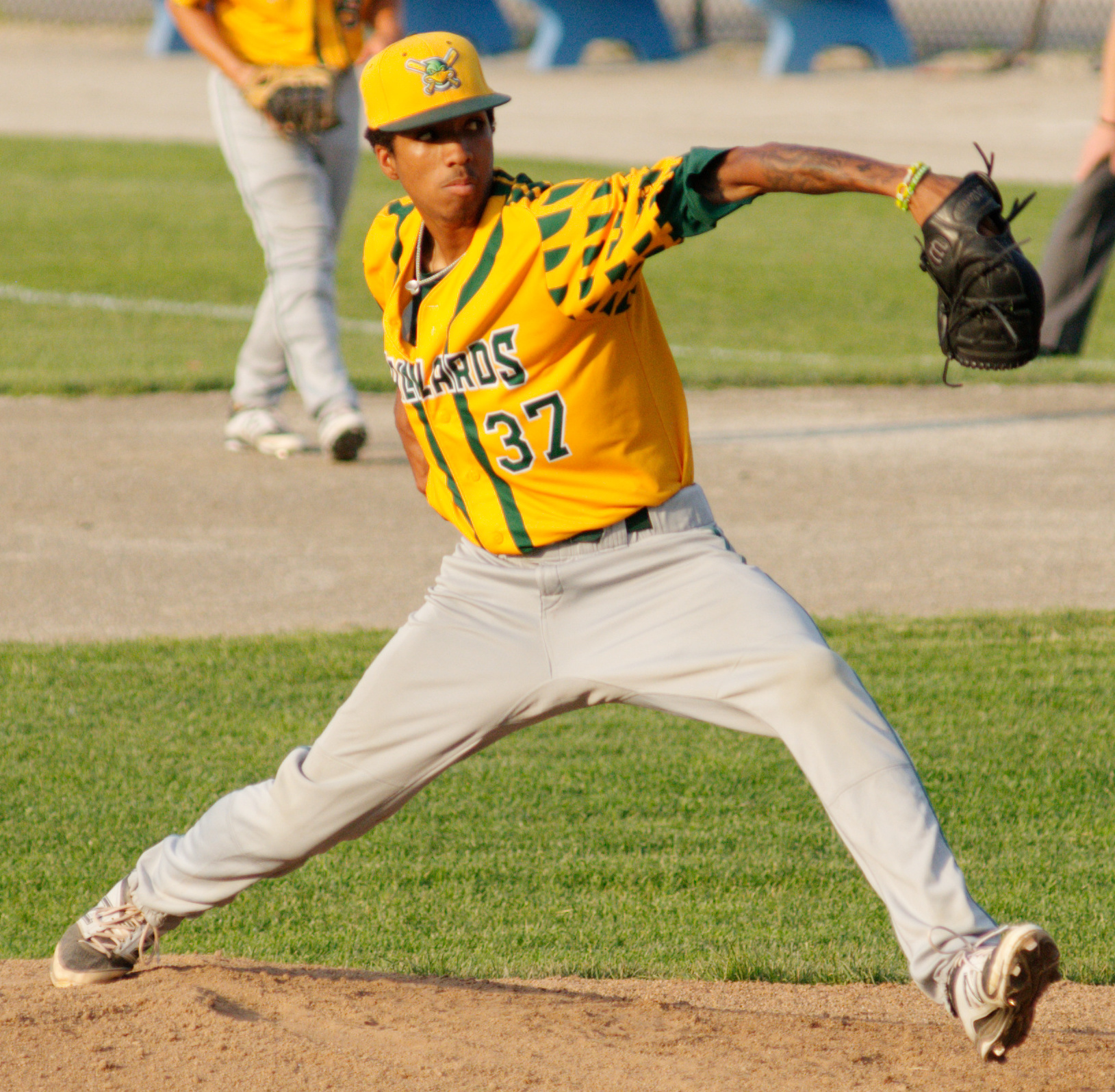
- Sharp with the Madison Mallards in 2014

Gastonia Ghost Peppers
- Pitcher
- Born: May 30, 1995 (age 31); Detroit, Michigan, U.S.
- Bats: Right Throws: Right

MLB debut
- August 5, 2020, for the Miami Marlins

MLB statistics (through 2020 season)
- Win–loss record: 0–0
- Earned run average: 10.13
- Strikeouts: 3
- Stats at Baseball Reference

Teams
- Miami Marlins (2020)

Sterling Barksdale Sharp (born May 30, 1995) is an American professional baseball pitcher for the Gastonia Ghost Peppers of the Atlantic League of Professional Baseball. He has previously played in Major League Baseball (MLB) for the Miami Marlins.

== Career ==
=== High school and college ===
Sharp was originally selected by the Atlanta Braves in the 30th round of the 2013 MLB draft out of North Farmington High School in Farmington Hills, Michigan. He elected not to sign, instead honoring a commitment to Eastern Michigan University. Three years later, Sharp was drafted by the Washington Nationals in the 22nd round of the 2016 MLB draft and elected to sign. At the time he was drafted by the Nationals, Sharp was playing for the Drury University Panthers after transferring from Eastern Michigan. He was only the second player from Drury to be drafted by an MLB team at the time of his signing.

=== Washington Nationals ===
Sharp made his professional debut with the GCL Nationals, and after posting a 3–0 record with a 3.24 earned run average (ERA) and 1.27 walks plus hits per inning pitched (WHIP), was promoted to the Auburn Doubledays, where he made one start to end the season. He began 2017 with the Hagerstown Suns and was later promoted to the Potomac Nationals. In 24 total games (22 starts) between both teams, he pitched to a 6–11 record, a 3.97 ERA and a 1.33 WHIP in 124 1/3 combined innings. He was also called upon by the major-league club toward the end of the year to pitch to hitters rehabbing from injury or preparing for the 2017 National League Division Series.

In 2018, Sharp returned to the Potomac Nationals and was named a Carolina League All-Star. He was promoted to the Double-A Harrisburg Senators for the first time in June 2018. He also made the MLB Pipeline list of top Nationals prospects, being ranked as the organization's 14th-best prospect the following month, the Nationals' fastest riser on the list. After the 2018 season, Baseball America ranked Sharp as the Nationals' eighth-best prospect. In 2019, Sharp battled injury issues, missing almost three months of the regular season with an oblique strain. Making up for lost time, he pitched for the Surprise Saguaros in the Arizona Fall League, earning pitcher-of-the-week honors for the week of October 7, 2019.

=== Miami Marlins ===
On December 12, 2019, Sharp was selected third overall in the 2019 Rule 5 draft by the Miami Marlins. He did not play in the minor leagues during 2020, as the minor-league season was cancelled. On August 5, 2020, Sharp made his MLB debut. He was designated for assignment on August 24. In four major-league appearances, Sharp pitched to a 10.13 ERA, having allowed 6 earned runs over 5 1/3 innings of relief while striking out three batters.

=== Washington Nationals (second stint) ===
On August 27, 2020, Sharp was returned to the Nationals organization by the Marlins. The Nationals added him to their 60-man player pool at their alternate training site in Fredericksburg, Virginia. During 2021, Sharp split time between Double-A Harrisburg and the Triple-A Rochester Red Wings; in 19 total appearances (17 starts), he compiled a 4–6 record with 4.43 ERA while striking out 59 batters in 85 1/3 innings. Sharp again pitched for Rochester in 2022, posting a 2–5 record in 18 appearances (13 starts) with 59 strikeouts in 66 2/3 innings and a 6.62 ERA. On August 5, 2022, Sharp was released by the Nationals.

=== Boston Red Sox ===
On August 9, 2022, Sharp signed a minor-league contract with the Boston Red Sox. He made 7 starts down the stretch for the Double–A Portland Sea Dogs, posting a 3.18 ERA with 31 strikeouts in 34.0 innings of work. Sharp elected free agency following the season on November 10.

On January 10, 2023, Sharp re-signed with the Red Sox organization on a new minor league contract. He returned to Portland, making 20 appearances (18 starts) and logging a 3–5 record and 5.36 ERA with 65 strikeouts across 85 2/3 innings of work. Sharp elected free agency following the season on November 6.

=== Lake Country DockHounds ===
On February 26, 2024, Sharp signed with the Lake Country DockHounds of the American Association of Professional Baseball. In 8 starts for the DockHounds, he logged a 1–2 record and 3.28 ERA with 27 strikeouts across 35 2/3 innings pitched.

=== Dorados de Chihuahua ===
On April 15, 2025, Sharp signed with the Dorados de Chihuahua of the Mexican League. In three appearances for Chihuahua, he struggled to a 7.20 ERA with four strikeouts over five innings of work. Sharp was released by the Dorados on April 29.

=== Long Island Ducks ===
On May 13, 2025, Sharp signed with the Long Island Ducks of the Atlantic League of Professional Baseball. He made three appearances (including two starts) for Long Island, but struggled to an 0–1 record and 14.40 ERA with 10 strikeouts over 10 innings pitched. Sharp became a free agent following the season.

=== Gastonia Ghost Peppers ===
On July 23, 2026, Sharp signed with the Gastonia Ghost Peppers of the Atlantic League of Professional Baseball.

== Pitching style ==
Sharp pitches right-handed. In 2017, after studying footage of Blake Treinen, Zach Britton, and others, he developed a sinker that had become his primary pitch by the 2018 season, largely supplanting his low-90s fastball in his arsenal. In addition to his sinker and straight fastball, Sharp also throws an above-average changeup and a slider.

In the media, Sharp has drawn some attention for the similarity of his name to retired National Football League wide receiver Sterling Sharpe.

== Personal life ==
Sharp is Catholic and married his wife Chloe in 2021 at the Cathedral of the Most Blessed Sacrament in Detroit.

== See also ==
- Rule 5 draft results
