= Bryan Bonnell =

American baseball player (born 1993)

- Pitcher
- Born: September 28, 1993 (age 32); Las Vegas, Nevada, U.S.
- Bats: Left Throws: Right
- Stats at Baseball Reference

Bryan Lindsey Bonnell (born September 28, 1993) is an American former professional baseball pitcher.

== Career ==
Bonnell played baseball at Centennial High School. The Chicago Cubs drafted him in the 31st round out of high school in 2012, but Bonnell elected to go to college instead of turning pro. He pitched in the Rebels' rotation at the University of Nevada, Las Vegas. In 2014, he played collegiate summer baseball with the Yarmouth–Dennis Red Sox of the Cape Cod Baseball League.

=== Tampa Bay Rays ===
Bonnell was again selected in the 2015 Major League Baseball draft, this time in the 36th round by the Tampa Bay Rays. He struggled with injuries during the 2015 collegiate season and ended up signing with Tampa Bay. He spent his first professional season with the GCL Rays and the rookie-level Princeton Rays, posting a 4.26 ERA in 17 total games. Bonnell spent the 2016 season with the Single-A Bowling Green Hot Rods, pitching to a 4.59 ERA with 63 strikeouts in 51.0 innings pitched across 24 appearances. Bonnell began the 2017 season with the High-A Charlotte Stone Crabs, posting a 4.09 ERA in 9 games.

=== Seattle Mariners ===
On May 9, 2017, Bonnell was traded to the Seattle Mariners in exchange for an international signing slot. He finished the year with the High–A Modesto Nuts, posting a 3.64 ERA with 51 strikeouts in 32 appearances. In 2018, Bonnell played for the Double–A Arkansas Travelers, recording a 3.17 ERA with 38 strikeouts in 48 1/3 innings of work across 32 games. He began the 2019 season with Arkansas, and pitched to a 4.26 ERA in 10 appearances before he was released on May 11, 2019.

=== Washington Nationals ===
On May 14, 2019, Bonnell signed a minor league contract with the Washington Nationals organization. He spent the remainder of the year climbing the Nationals' farm system, appearing for the High-A Potomac Nationals, the Double-A Harrisburg Senators, and the Triple-A Fresno Grizzlies. He elected free agency on November 4.

On February 12, 2020, Bonnell re-signed with the Nationals organization on a new minor league contract and received an invitation to 2020 major league spring training camp Bonnell did not play in a game in 2020 due to the cancellation of the minor league season because of the COVID-19 pandemic. However, the Nationals invited him to major league spring training again in 2021. He did not make the team out of spring and spent the year with the Triple-A Rochester Red Wings, logging a 4.29 ERA with 59 strikeouts in 65.0 innings pitched across 36 appearances. He elected minor league free agency following the season on November 7, 2021.

=== Tecolotes de los Dos Laredos ===
On April 20, 2022, Bonnell signed with the Tecolotes de los Dos Laredos of the Mexican League. He pitched in only one game for Dos Laredos, allowing five runs on five hits with three strikeouts.

=== Lake Country DockHounds ===
On March 15, 2024, Bonnell signed with the Lake Country DockHounds of the American Association of Professional Baseball. In 16 games for the DockHounds, he compiled a 5–7 record and 4.26 ERA with 51 strikeouts across 88 2/3 innings pitched. On October 23, Bonnell announced his retirement from professional baseball on Instagram.
