= Andrew Stevenson (baseball) =

American baseball player (born 1994)

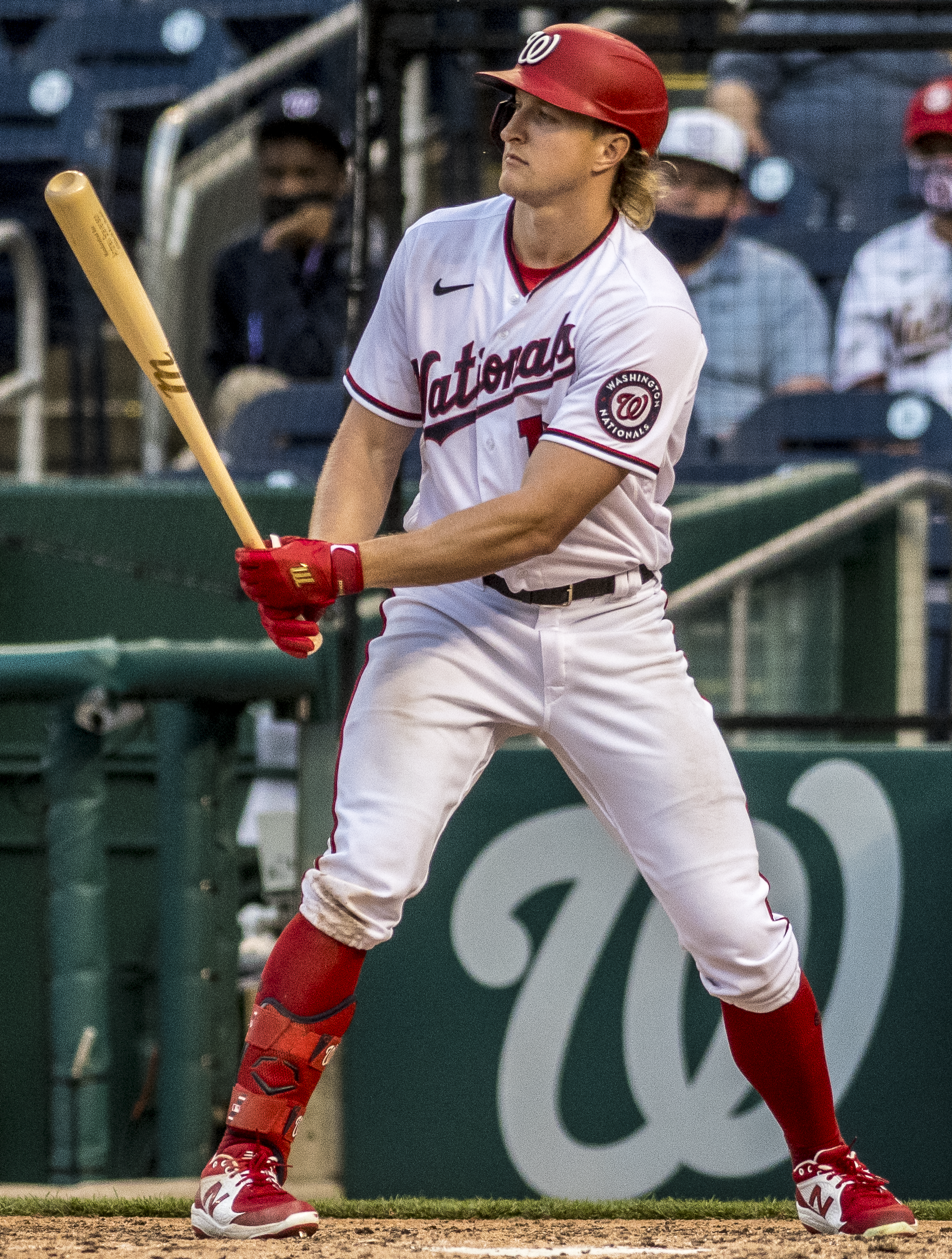
- Stevenson with the Washington Nationals in 2021

Piratas de Campeche – No. 4
- Outfielder
- Born: June 1, 1994 (age 32); Lafayette, Louisiana, U.S.
- Bats: Left Throws: Left

Professional debut
- MLB: July 23, 2017, for the Washington Nationals
- NPB: March 29, 2024, for the Hokkaido Nippon-Ham Fighters
- KBO: August 6, 2025, for the KT Wiz

MLB statistics (through 2023 season)
- Batting average: .243
- Home runs: 8
- Runs batted in: 50

NPB statistics (through 2024 season)
- Batting average: .161
- Home runs: 0
- Runs batted in: 0

KBO statistics (through 2025 season)
- Batting average: .262
- Home runs: 3
- Runs batted in: 14
- Stats at Baseball Reference

Teams
- Washington Nationals (2017–2021); Minnesota Twins (2023); Hokkaido Nippon-Ham Fighters (2024); KT Wiz (2025)

Andrew Patrick Stevenson (born June 1, 1994) is an American professional baseball outfielder for the Piratas de Campeche of the Mexican League. He has previously played in Major League Baseball (MLB) for the Washington Nationals and Minnesota Twins, in Nippon Professional Baseball (NPB) for the Hokkaido Nippon-Ham Fighters, and in the KBO League for the KT Wiz.

== Early life ==
Stevenson was a member of the Lafayette Little League team that represented Lafayette, Louisiana and the Southwest region at the 2005 Little League World Series. He attended St. Thomas More Catholic High School in Lafayette, Louisiana.

== College career ==
Stevenson played college baseball at Louisiana State University (LSU) from 2013 to 2015. After his sophomore season in 2014, he played collegiate summer baseball for the Yarmouth–Dennis Red Sox of the Cape Cod Baseball League, where he batted .311 with 23 stolen bases in 53 games, was named to the 2014 All-League team, and helped lead the Red Sox to the league championship. At LSU, he was a teammate of shortstop Alex Bregman, the second overall pick in the 2015 draft by the Houston Astros. In both Stevenson and Bregman's final season of college ball, the LSU Tigers reached the 2015 College World Series. En route to the Tigers' World Series berth, Stevenson attracted media attention with an outstanding defensive play in center field. Playing behind starting pitcher Jared Poche, Stevenson leaped toward the warning track and laid out to take away a likely RBI extra-base hit from the University of North Carolina Wilmington's designated hitter. He then scrambled to his feet and threw from deep center field to the second baseman, doubling up the runner on base. The Times-Picayune, writing about the game, referred to Stevenson's play as "The Catch" and compared the LSU outfielder to American football wide receiver Odell Beckham Jr., known for his athletic plays on the field. The Tigers ultimately were eliminated in the World Series by the TCU Horned Frogs.

== Professional career ==
=== Washington Nationals ===
==== 2015 ====
Stevenson was drafted by the Washington Nationals in the second round of the 2015 Major League Baseball draft. He signed with the Nationals and made his professional debut that year with the Gulf Coast Nationals. He was later promoted to the Auburn Doubledays and Hagerstown Suns. In 55 games between the three teams, he batted .308/.363/.379 with one home run, 25 RBIs, and 23 stolen bases.

==== 2016 ====
Stevenson spent 2016 playing for the High-A Potomac Nationals and Class-AA Harrisburg Senators. In 133 combined games, he compiled a .276 batting average with three home runs, 34 RBIs, and 39 stolen bases. After the season, Stevenson was one of a handful of Nationals prospects to play in the Arizona Fall League. Playing for the Glendale Desert Dogs, he led the AFL in hits with 30 and posted a .353 batting average, second in the league, and was named along with Desert Dogs and Senators teammate Drew Ward to the 2016 AFL Top Prospects Team.

After Lucas Giolito, Reynaldo Lopez and Dane Dunning were traded to the Chicago White Sox in December 2016, Stevenson ranked as the Nationals' fifth-best prospect, according to MLB.com.

==== 2017 ====
Stevenson received an invitation to major league camp in the 2017 season. He played well, impressing Nationals manager Dusty Baker, who remarked of the outfielder, "He's always ready. When I look down there, he's already looking at me." Stevenson was reassigned to minor league camp on March 13.

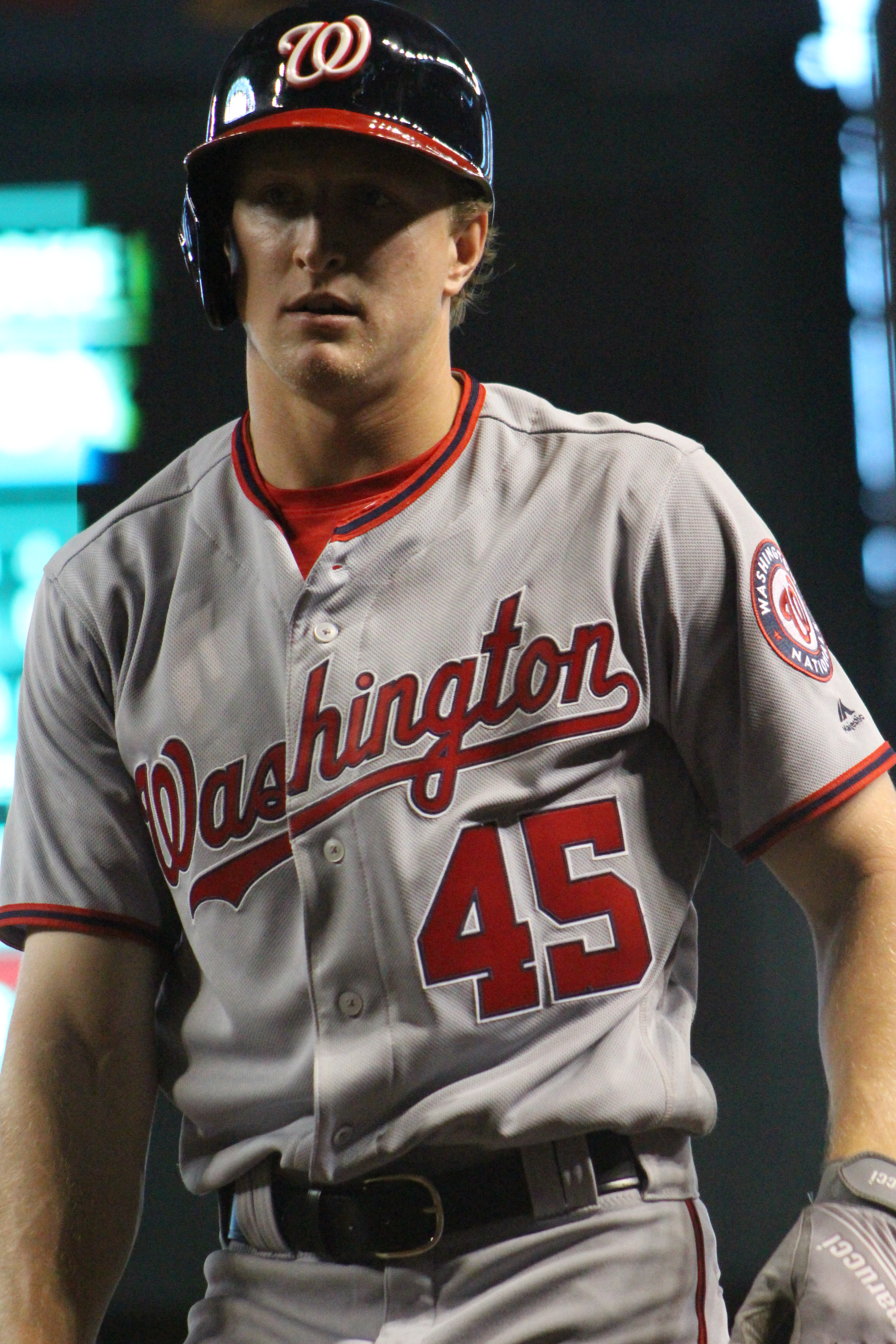
Stevenson in 2017

After beginning his season with Double-A Harrisburg and hitting .316 in April, Stevenson was promoted to the Triple-A Syracuse Chiefs. Stevenson struggled in the early going with Syracuse, hitting just .169 over his first 31 games before turning his game around. After amassing a .246 batting average overall as a Chief, Stevenson was promoted to the major leagues on July 23, 2017, after outfielders Chris Heisey and Ryan Raburn were placed on the disabled list and bereavement list, respectively. He made his major league debut the same day, pinch-hitting and coming in on a double switch in the sixth inning to play left field. On July 27, Stevenson notched his first major league hit, lining a pitch into right field off Hernán Pérez of the Milwaukee Brewers — a utility player pitching in the major leagues for the first time, with his team trailing by 13 runs in the bottom of the eighth inning — for a single. The following month, on August 10, he made a diving catch down the left field line to take away an RBI and extra bases from Miami Marlins second baseman Dee Gordon with two outs in the top of the ninth, preserving a 3–2 lead in the game as Nationals closer Sean Doolittle locked down the save. On August 27, Stevenson recorded his first major league RBI with a go-ahead, bases-loaded walk against the New York Mets that gave the Nationals a 5-4 victory. On August 28, the Nationals optioned Stevenson back to Syracuse following the return of left fielder Jayson Werth from the disabled list. On September 7, the Nationals recalled Stevenson. He finished the regular season with the Nationals, having appeared in 37 games, batting .158 with an RBI and a stolen base.

==== 2018 ====
Stevenson began the 2018 season with the Triple–A Syracuse Chiefs, but the Nationals called him up to the major leagues on April 16. Stevenson entered a game on April 25 against the San Francisco Giants at AT&T Park with only 10 major-league hits and two major-league RBIs in his career, but, playing in left field that day, he went 4-for-5 from the plate with two doubles and a walk and scored two runs as part of a Nationals offensive explosion that ended in a 15–2 Washington victory. After Stevenson appeared in 25 games for Washington, hitting .255 with eight RBIs, the Nationals optioned him back to Syracuse on June 1.

==== 2019 ====
In 2019 he batted .367/.486/.467 in 30 at bats. 2019 would also see him make his postseason debut: pinch-running for Ryan Zimmerman in the 8th inning of the Wild Card Game against the Milwaukee Brewers, he would score the tying run on Juan Soto’s single; acting aggressively due to Stevenson’s speed, Brewers right fielder Trent Grisham misplayed the ball, allowing the eventual winning run to score as well. While not on the playoff roster for the rest of the Nationals’ championship run, Stevenson would take the field before Game 3 of the World Series to catch the ceremonial first pitch from Apollo 11 astronaut Buzz Aldrin.

==== 2020 ====
In 2020 he batted .366/.447/.732 in 41 at bats. He had the fastest home run trot of all major league players, at 17.3 seconds.

==== 2021 ====
In 2021, Stevenson spent the majority of the year with Washington, also playing in 15 games for the Triple-A Rochester Red Wings. In 109 games for the Nationals, Stevenson slashed .229/.294/.339 with 5 home runs and 23 RBI.

==== 2022 ====
On April 2, 2022, Stevenson was outrighted off of the 40-man roster. He appeared in 135 games for the Triple-A Rochester Red Wings, slashing .279/.344/.457 with 16 home runs, 67 RBI, and 39 stolen bases. Stevenson elected free agency following the season on November 10.

=== Minnesota Twins ===
On March 9, 2023, Stevenson signed a minor league contract with the Minnesota Twins organization. In 106 games for the Triple–A St. Paul Saints, he batted .317/.395/.522 with 16 home runs, 57 RBI, and 44 stolen bases. On September 1, Stevenson was selected to the major league roster after rosters expanded. In 25 games for Minnesota, he hit .189/.250/.216 with no home runs, one RBI, and four stolen bases. Following the season on October 20, Stevenson was removed from the 40–man roster and sent outright to Triple–A St. Paul. On October 23, Stevenson elected free agency.

=== Hokkaido Nippon-Ham Fighters ===
On December 13, 2023, Stevenson signed an $850K contract with the Hokkaido Nippon-Ham Fighters of Nippon Professional Baseball (NPB). He played in 24 games for the Fighters in 2024, slashing .161/.175/.194 with no home runs, no RBI, and one stolen base. Stevenson was released by Nippon–Ham on September 10.

=== Piratas de Campeche ===
On April 4, 2025, Stevenson signed with the Piratas de Campeche of the Mexican League. In five games for Campeche, Stevenson went 6-for-18 (.333) with five RBI and two stolen bases.

=== Tampa Bay Rays ===
On April 26, 2025, Stevenson signed a minor league contract with the Tampa Bay Rays. In 58 appearances for the Triple-A Durham Bulls, he batted .294/.366/.467 with five home runs, 22 RBI, and 18 stolen bases. Stevenson was released by the Rays organization on August 1.

=== KT Wiz ===
On August 3, 2025, Stevenson signed with the KT Wiz of the KBO League. In 39 appearances for the team, he batted .262/.341/.403 with three home runs, 14 RBI, and two stolen bases. Stevenson became a free agent following the season.

=== Piratas de Campeche (second stint) ===
On April 11, 2026, Stevenson signed with the Piratas de Campeche of the Mexican League.

== Playing style ==
Stevenson was described by Nationals general manager Mike Rizzo after being drafted in 2015 as someone who "plays 100 mph with his hair on fire", a phrase he has also applied to standout players like Bryce Harper and Adam Eaton. He is considered to be one of the faster players in professional baseball, with highly rated defense in center field, although baseball writer John Sickels in 2016 questioned his arm strength and ability to hit consistently. He has a compact swing with great bat speed, but he is not considered a power hitter.
