= Yaddi Bolagh, Ahar =

Yaddi Bolagh يدي بلاغ
- Village
- Location within Iran
- Coordinates: 38°56′55″N 47°17′59″E
- Country: Iran
- Province: East Azerbaijan
- County: Ahar
- Bakhsh: Hurand
- Rural District: Dodangeh

Population (2006)
  - Total: 17
- Time zone: UTC+3:30 (IRST)
  - Summer (DST): UTC+4:30 (IRDT)

Yaddi Bolagh (Persian: يدي بلاغ, also Romanized as Yaddī Bolāgh) is a village in Dodangeh Rural District, Hurand District, Ahar County, East Azerbaijan Province, Iran. At the 2006 census, its population was 17, in 5 families.
