= Dakota Bacus =

American baseball player (born 1991)

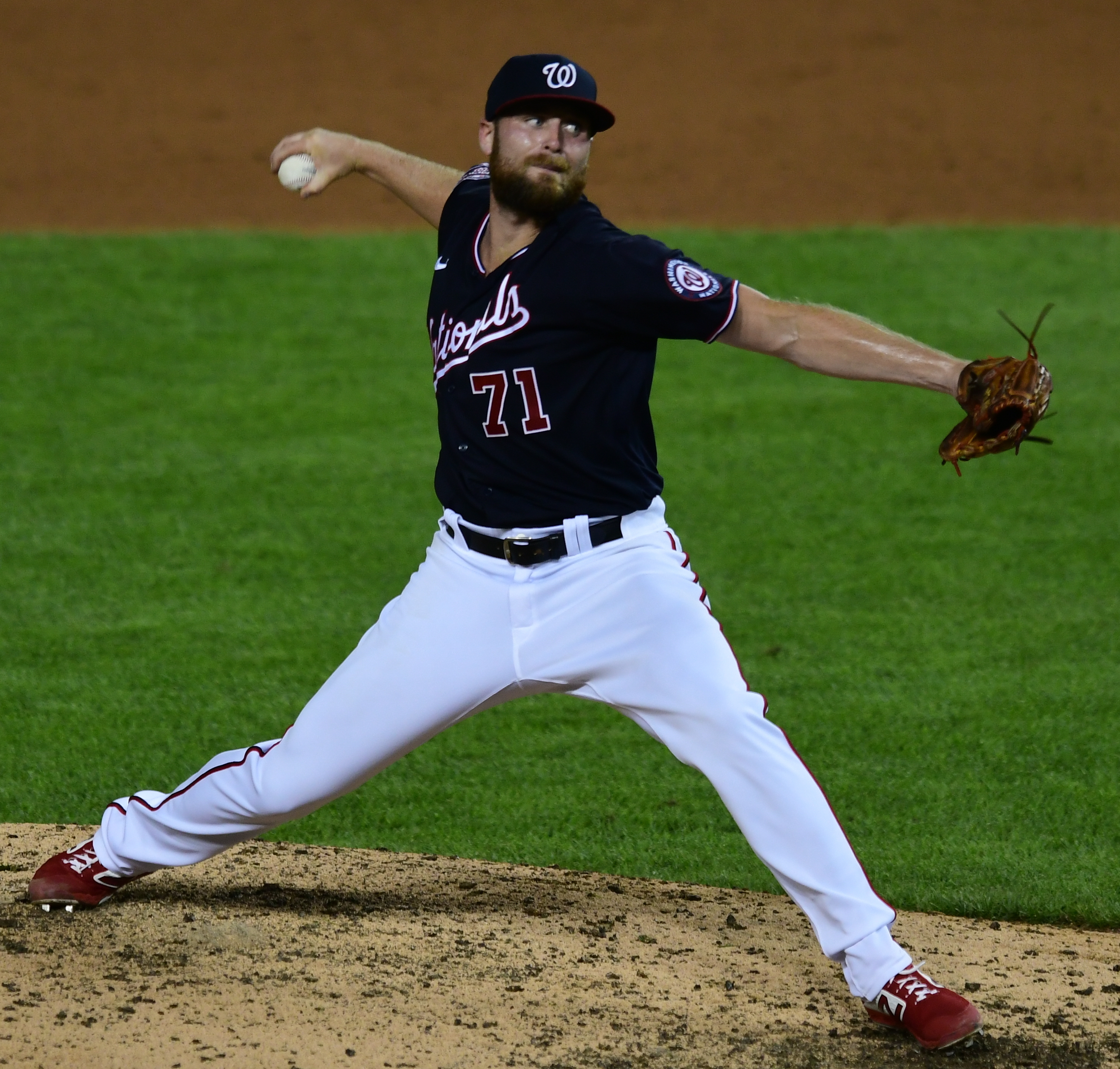
- Bacus with the Washington Nationals in 2020
- Pitcher
- Born: April 2, 1991 (age 35); Moline, Illinois, U.S.
- Batted: Right Threw: Right

MLB debut
- August 14, 2020, for the Washington Nationals

Last MLB appearance
- September 6, 2020, for the Washington Nationals

Career statistics
- Win–loss record: 0–0
- Earned run average: 7.94
- Strikeouts: 7
- Stats at Baseball Reference

Teams
- Washington Nationals (2020)

Dakota John Bacus (born April 2, 1991) is an American former professional baseball pitcher. He played in Major League Baseball (MLB) for the Washington Nationals during the 2020 season.

== Career ==
=== Oakland Athletics ===
Drafted out of Indiana State University by the Oakland Athletics in the 2012 Major League Baseball draft's ninth round, Bacus pitched mostly as a starter for the Single–A Beloit Snappers in his first full professional season in 2013. Bacus gained some media notoriety for a recurring on-field stunt in 2013 with Beloit, in which he would dress in all-white and stand on the warning track with his back to the white outfield wall during home games. "The Whitewall Ninja" would remain on the field, even when balls were put in play into the outfield, until he was noticed and told to go back to the bullpen. The Athletics' minor league coordinator ultimately stepped in to put a stop to the gag.

=== Washington Nationals ===
Bacus was traded to the Washington Nationals in exchange for catcher Kurt Suzuki on August 23, 2013. In the Nationals system over the next few years, Bacus made slow progress, briefly reaching the Triple–A Syracuse Chiefs, the Nationals' top minor league affiliate, in 2015. After an injury-marred 2016 season in which he didn't make it back to Triple–A, Bacus considered retiring from professional baseball. In 2017, Bacus experienced a marked jump in performance, pitching to a 1.80 ERA out of the High–A Potomac Nationals and Double–A Harrisburg Senators bullpens. He was invited to pitch in the Arizona Fall League after the 2017 season, appearing with the Mesa Solar Sox. Bacus later told his hometown paper, The Rock Island Dispatch-Argus, that he had rediscovered what made baseball fun for him in 2017.

After spending the 2018 season with the Senators, Bacus was promoted in April 2019 to the Triple–A Fresno Grizzlies, his first return to the level in nearly four years. He was named a Pacific Coast League All-Star in 2019, alongside teammate Yadiel Hernández. By late June 2019, Bacus was being mentioned as a candidate for a promotion to the Nationals' major league bullpen by media outlets covering Washington baseball.

Bacus did not end up contributing to the Nationals' championship season in 2019, playing out the year with the Grizzlies. He became a minor league free agent after the season's end. On February 12, 2020, Bacus re-signed with the Nationals on a minor league contract.

The Nationals promoted Bacus to the major leagues for the first time on August 14, 2020 and he made his major league debut that day against the Baltimore Orioles.

On March 28, 2021, Bacus was designated for assignment after Luis Avilán was added to the roster. On March 30, he cleared waivers and was sent outright to the Triple–A Rochester Red Wings. Bacus retired after the 2021 season.

== Pitching style ==
Bacus, a right-hander, threw a fastball in the low to mid-90s and offset it with a breaking ball.
