= Ben Braymer =

American baseball player (born 1994)

Toros de Tijuana – No. 45
- Pitcher
- Born: April 28, 1994 (age 32); Baton Rouge, Louisiana, U.S.
- Bats: Left Throws: Left

Professional debut
- MLB: August 28, 2020, for the Washington Nationals
- CPBL: August 25, 2024, for the Fubon Guardians

MLB statistics (through 2020 season)
- Win–loss record: 1–0
- Earned run average: 1.23
- Strikeouts: 8

CPBL statistics (through 2024 season)
- Win–loss record: 0–4
- Earned run average: 3.81
- Strikeouts: 26
- Stats at Baseball Reference

Teams
- Washington Nationals (2020); Fubon Guardians (2024)

Benjamin John Braymer (born April 28, 1994) is an American professional baseball pitcher for the Toros de Tijuana of the Mexican League. He has previously played in Major League Baseball (MLB) for the Washington Nationals, and in the Chinese Professional Baseball League (CPBL) for the Fubon Guardians.

== Baseball career ==
A Louisiana native, Braymer began his college baseball career at Louisiana State University at Eunice where, in 2015, he struck out an NJCAA record 138 batters en route to a national championship. As of August 2020, that record still stands. After two years, he transferred to Auburn University where he was an eighteenth-round selection by the Nationals in the 2016 Major League Baseball draft, where he was roommates with Gabe Klobosits, who was drafted by the Nationals the following year.

=== Washington Nationals ===
In his first full professional season in 2017, Braymer pitched for the Low-A Auburn Doubledays and the Single-A Hagerstown Suns. He and Klobosits were both among several minor league pitchers brought over to pitch to the major league Nationals hitters as they prepared for the 2017 National League Division Series.

Braymer led all Nationals minor league pitchers with a 2.28 ERA in 2018, pitching for the Suns and High-A Potomac Nationals. Along with Wil Crowe, he was named the Nationals' co-Minor League Pitcher of the Year. He was one of eight Nationals prospects invited to participate in the Arizona Fall League after the 2018 season, where he played for the Salt River Rafters.

Before the 2019 season, MLB Pipeline ranked Braymer as Washington's 25th-best prospect. In late June 2019, he was promoted to the highest minor league level for the first time, joining the starting rotation of the Triple-A Fresno Grizzlies.

On November 20, 2019, the Nationals added Braymer to their 40-man roster to protect him from the Rule 5 draft. He made his major league debut on August 28, 2020, giving up one run in two innings in a win over the Boston Red Sox at Fenway Park. In his rookie season, Braymer logged a 1.23 ERA across 3 appearances.

Braymer was assigned to the Triple–A Rochester Red Wings to begin the 2021 season. After struggling to a 1-5 record and 6.75 ERA in 7 appearances, Braymer was designated for assignment on June 20, 2021, following the selection of Gerardo Parra. He cleared waivers and was sent outright to Rochester on June 24. Braymer made 25 appearances (21 starts) for Rochester in 2021, working to a 7-8 record and 5.78 ERA with 79 strikeouts in 99 2/3 innings of work. In 2022, Braymer made 11 appearances (1 start) for Rochester, but struggled to a 6.75 ERA with 19 strikeouts in 18 2/3 innings pitched. He was released by the Nationals organization on May 27, 2022.

=== High Point Rockers ===
On April 28, 2023, Braymer signed with the High Point Rockers of the Atlantic League of Professional Baseball. In 4 starts for the Rockers, Braymer registered a 2-0 record and 1.16 ERA with 23 strikeouts across 23 1/3 innings pitched.

=== Colorado Rockies ===
On May 17, 2023, Braymer's contract was purchased by the Colorado Rockies organization. In 16 appearances (15 starts) for the Triple–A Albuquerque Isotopes, he struggled to a 1–7 record and 9.75 ERA with 42 strikeouts in 60 innings of work. On October 3, Braymer was released by Colorado.

=== High Point Rockers (second stint) ===
On May 21, 2024, Braymer signed with the High Point Rockers of the Atlantic League of Professional Baseball. In seven starts, he posted a 3–2 record with a 3.55 ERA and 34 strikeouts over 33 innings pitched.

=== Toros de Tijuana ===
On July 5, 2024, Braymer's contract was purchased by the Toros de Tijuana of the Mexican League. In 3 starts for Tijuana, Braymer compiled a 2–0 record and 1.06 ERA with 23 strikeouts over 17 innings of work.

=== Fubon Guardians ===
On August 16, 2024, Braymer signed with the Fubon Guardians of the Chinese Professional Baseball League. In 6 starts, Braymer logged an 0-4 record and 3.81 ERA with 26 strikeouts across 28 1/3 innings pitched. He became a free agent following the season.

=== Toros de Tijuana (second stint) ===
On March 6, 2025, Braymer signed with the Toros de Tijuana of the Mexican League. In 15 starts he threw 69.1 innings going 6-5 with a 4.15 ERA and 73 strikeouts.
