= Yadi, Iran =

Yadi يدي
- Village
- Location within Iran
- Coordinates: 31°49′41″N 48°38′03″E
- Country: Iran
- Province: Khuzestan
- County: Shush
- Bakhsh: Shavur
- Rural District: Ahudasht

Population (2006)
  - Total: 196
- Time zone: UTC+3:30 (IRST)
  - Summer (DST): UTC+4:30 (IRDT)

Yadi (Persian: يدي, also Romanized as Yadī; also known as Beyt-e Yadī) is a village in Ahudasht Rural District, Shavur District, Shush County, Khuzestan Province, Iran. At the 2006 census, its population was 196, in 27 families.
