= Yadiel Hernández =

Cuban baseball player (born 1987)

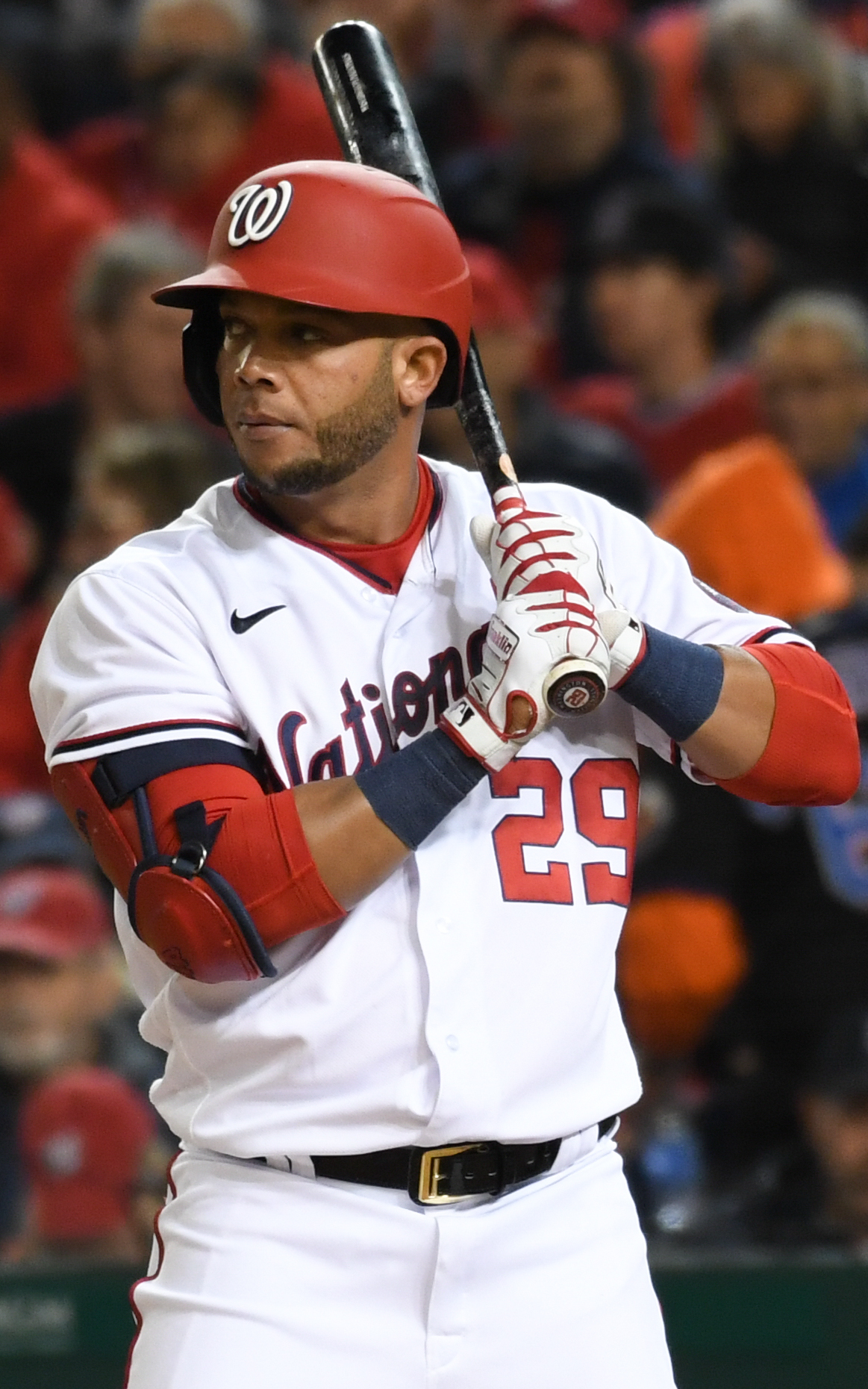
- Hernández with the Washington Nationals in 2021

Free agent
- Outfielder
- Born: October 9, 1987 (age 38); Matanzas, Cuba
- Bats: Left Throws: Right

MLB debut
- September 10, 2020, for the Washington Nationals

MLB statistics (through 2022 season)
- Batting average: .267
- Home runs: 19
- Runs batted in: 79
- Stats at Baseball Reference

Teams
- Washington Nationals (2020–2022)
Medals
Men's baseball
Representing Cuba
World Port Tournament
Gold medal – first place	2013 Rotterdam	Team

Yadiel Hernández (born October 9, 1987) is a Cuban professional baseball outfielder who is a free agent. After playing in the Cuban National Series for Cocodrilos de Matanzas, he played in Major League Baseball (MLB) for the Washington Nationals.

== Career ==
=== Cuban National Series ===
Hernández began his baseball career with the Cocodrilos in 2009. After hitting .369 for Matanzas in the 2014–15 Cuban National Series, Hernández defected to the United States at age 28 along with Cuban national teammate Luis Yander La O in June 2015, while they were in North Carolina for a game against American college baseball players. Hernández was declared eligible to sign with a Major League Baseball team in April 2016.

=== Washington Nationals ===
On October 1, 2016, the Washington Nationals, not usually a major player for Cuban talent, signed him to a minor league deal with a $200,000 signing bonus.

After playing for the Double-A Harrisburg Senators in 2017 and 2018, Hernández was promoted to Triple-A. In 149 combined games for Harrisburg, Hernández hit .297/.389/.461 with 19 home runs and 81 RBI. He hit his first professional grand slam on May 9, 2019, for the Fresno Grizzlies of the Pacific Coast League. Along with teammate Dakota Bacus, he represented Fresno in the 2019 Triple-A All-Star Game. He finished the year hitting .324/.406/.604 with 33 home runs, 90 RBI, and 7 stolen bases in 126 games for Fresno.

At age 32, Hernández was called up to the major leagues for the first time on September 10, 2020, after Nationals infielder Howie Kendrick was placed on the injured list. He made his major league debut that day against the Atlanta Braves. He played in 12 games during his rookie campaign, going 5-for-26 with one home run and 6 RBI.

In 2021, he batted .273/.329/.413 with 9 home runs and 32 RBI in 112 games. He had the slowest sprint speed of all major league left fielders, at 25.3 feet/second. In 2022, Hernández appeared in 94 games for Washington, batting .269/.312/.410 with 9 home runs and 41 RBI. His season ended early on August 27, when he was placed on the injured list with a left calf strain. Hernández was removed from the 40-man roster and sent outright to Triple-A on November 15, 2022.

Hernández began the 2023 season with the Triple-A Rochester Red Wings, playing in 10 games and hitting .205/.225/.256 with no home runs and 4 RBI. On April 17, 2023, Hernández was released by the Nationals organization.

=== Sultanes de Monterrey ===
On May 5, 2023, Hernández signed with the Sultanes de Monterrey of the Mexican League. In 64 games for the Sultanes, he hit .281/.344/.404 with 6 home runs and 39 RBI. On February 26, 2024, Hernández was released by Monterrey.

=== Tecolotes de los Dos Laredos ===
On March 5, 2024, Hernández signed with the Tecolotes de los Dos Laredos of the Mexican League. In an April 23 game against the Rieleros de Aguascalientes, Hernández hit for the cycle as the Tecolotes won 11–3. In 93 appearances for Dos Laredos, he batted .300/.391/.479 with 14 home runs and 70 RBI.

Hernández played in 92 games for the team during the 2025 season, hitting .340/.444/.627 with 26 home runs, 96 RBI, and 10 stolen bases. He made 42 appearances for the Tecolotes in 2026, slashing .243/.360/.372 with four home runs and 20 RBI. On June 10, 2026, Hernández was released by Dos Laredos.

=== Charros de Jalisco ===
On June 15, 2026, Hernández signed with the Charros de Jalisco of the Mexican League. In 16 games for the Charros, he struggled to a .106/.192/.170 slash line with one home run and five RBI. On July 8, Hernández was released by Jalisco.
