= Yadier =

- Gender: masculine
- Language: Spanish

Origin
- Language: Hebrew
- Meaning: Friend or Companion

Other names
- Nickname: Yadi

Yadier is a masculine given name. It has Hebrew origins where it means "friend or companion". It is a Spanish-language name, popular in Cuba and Puerto Rico.

== People with the name ==
- Yadier Álvarez (born 1996), Cuban baseball pitcher
- Yadier Molina (born 1982), Puerto Rican baseball catcher
- Yadier Pedroso (1986–2013), Cuban baseball pitcher
- Yadier Sánchez (born 1987), Cuban volleyball player
