= Florida Complex League Nationals =

- (1969–1970, 1974, 1977, 1986–present); West Palm Beach, Florida

Minor league affiliations
- Class: Rookie
- League: Florida Complex League
- Division: East Division
- Previous leagues: Gulf Coast League (1969–1970, 1974, 1977, 1986–2020)

Major league affiliations
- Team: Washington Nationals (2005–present)
- Previous teams: Montreal Expos (pre-2005)

Minor league titles
- League titles (4): 1969; 1991; 2009; 2013
- Division titles (7): 1990; 1991; 1992; 1996; 2008; 2013; 2017

Team data
- Name: FCL Nationals
- Previous names: GCL Nationals (2005–2020); GCL Expos (1969–1970, 1974, 1977, 1986–2004)
- Colors: Red, white, blue
- Ballpark: Cacti Park of the Palm Beaches (2017–present)
- Previous parks: Space Coast Stadium (2005–2016)
- Owner/ Operator: Washington Nationals
- Manager: Carmelo Jaime

The Florida Complex League Nationals are a Rookie-level affiliate of the Washington Nationals, competing in the Florida Complex League of Minor League Baseball. Prior to the 2021 season, the team was known as the Gulf Coast League Nationals. The team plays its home games in West Palm Beach, Florida, at Cacti Park of the Palm Beaches. The team previously played at Space Coast Stadium from their inaugural 2005 season through the end of the 2016 season. The team is composed mainly of players who are in their first year of professional baseball either as draftees or non-drafted free agents.

== History ==
=== GCL Expos (1969–2004) ===
From 1969 to 2004, the team was known as the Gulf Coast League Expos and was a minor league affiliate of the Montreal Expos. The team played in the Gulf Coast League from 1969 to 1970, in 1974, in 1977, and again from 1986 to 2004.

The team was based in various Florida cities during these years: in Sarasota in 1969, in Bradenton in 1970, in Sarasota in 1974 and 1977, in Bradenton from 1986 to 1991, in West Palm Beach from 1992 to 1997, in Jupiter in 1998 and 1999, in Bradenton in 2000, in Jupiter in 2001, and in Melbourne from 2002 to 2004.

The team won two Gulf Coast League championships over the course of its history, the first in 1969 under manager J. W. Porter and the second in 1991 under manager Keith Snider.

=== GCL Nationals (2005–2020) ===
After the 2004 season, when the Montreal Expos relocated and became the Washington Nationals, the Gulf Coast League Expos became the Gulf Coast League Nationals, beginning play as such in the 2005 season.

In 2013, the team finished their regular season with a record of 49–9. This .845 winning percentage was the highest winning percentage for a full regular season ever achieved by a Minor League Baseball team based in the United States. The only minor league team to have a better winning percentage over a full regular season was the Toronto Blue Jays' 1992 Dominican Summer League team based in the Dominican Republic, which finished at 68–2 with a .971 winning percentage. The Nationals then won all three of their playoff games, defeating the Gulf Coast League Pirates in a single-game semifinal playoff and sweeping the Gulf Coast League Red Sox in the best-of-three league championship series, to become the 2013 Gulf Coast League champions.

The team pulled off a historic feat on July 23, 2017, no-hitting the Gulf Coast League Marlins in both ends of a double-header. Four Nationals pitchers appeared in the two seven-inning games. In the first game, which the Nationals won 4–0, Joan Baez pitched six innings, striking out seven and retiring the last 14 batters he faced, and Jose Jimenez pitched the final inning. In the second game, a 1–0 Nationals win, Jaren Johnson pitched the first four innings in his seventh professional appearance and second professional start, and Gilberto Chu relieved him to finish the game with three no-hit innings.

The start of the 2020 season was postponed due to the COVID-19 pandemic before ultimately being canceled on June 30.

=== FCL Nationals (2021–present) ===
Prior to the 2021 season, the Gulf Coast League was renamed as the Florida Complex League.

== Roster ==
Florida Complex League Nationals roster
Players		Coaches/Other
Pitchers: -- Cooper Allen; -- Cirian Caughey; 30 Brenner Cox; -- Matthew Dallas; 54 Brock Gillis; -- Max Hansmann; -- Cooper Harris; -- Clarence Martina; 74 Maximin Medina; -- Weston Moss; -- Tony Neubeck; -- Tyler Papenbrock; -- Gage Peterson; 59 Jean Robles; -- Bennett Roemer; -- Anson Seibert; -- Miles Smith; 61 Yaiker Torrelles	Catchers: 23 Daniel Hernandez; -- Francisco Rivero ‡; 14 Feldi Tavarez; Infielders: 24 Luis Arias; 2 Brayan Cortesia; -- Daniel Cuvet; 9 Marconi German; -- Luke Williams; Outfielders: -- Jack Brooks; -- Chase Brunson; 19 Nauris De La Cruz; -- Chris Hacopian; 13 Victor Hurtado; 1 Browm Martinez; 27 Juan Obispo; -- James Smith IV; -- Nick Williams	Manager: 16 Carmelo Jaime; Coaches: 34 Franklin Bravo (pitching); 57 Ender Chávez (hitting); 12 Cayden Phillips (defensive); 24 Dustin Simanek (complex pitching); 60-day injured list: -- Julio Chivilli (full season); 56 Jose Feliz; 64 Darrel Lunar (full season); 41 Henry Moreno; 7-day injured list; * On Washington Nationals 40-man roster; ~ Development list; # Rehab assignment; ∞ Reserve list; ‡ Restricted list; § Suspended list; † Temporarily inactive list; Roster updated October 2, 2026; Transactions; → More rosters: MiLB • Florida Complex League; → Washington Nationals minor league players

== Season-by-season results ==
GCL Expos (1969–2004)
Year	Record	Finish	Manager	Playoffs
1969	31–22	1st	J. W. Porter	League champions No playoffs until 1983
1970	36–27	2nd	Ed Sadowski	—
1974	21–33	7th	Pat Daugherty	—
1977	19–35	8th	Ray Bellino	—
1986	33–29	4th (tie)	Mike Easom	—
1987	21–42	9th	Jethro McIntyre	—
1988	24–39	9th	Dave Jauss	—
1989	28–35	9th	Jerry Weinstein	—
1990	40–23	1st	Gomer Hodge	Lost league finals vs. GCL Dodgers (2 games to 0)
1991	32–28	3rd	Keith Snider	League champions vs. GCL Orioles (2 games to 1); Won in first round vs. GCL Red Sox (1 game to 0)
1992	35–24	2nd (tie)	Nelson Norman	Lost league finals vs. GCL Royals (2 games to 1); Won in first round vs. GCL Blue Jays (1 game to 0)
1993	27–31	11th	Nelson Norman	—
1994	35–24	5th	Nelson Norman	—
1995	21–35	12th	Luis Dorante	—
1996	41–18	1st	Jim Gabella	Lost in 1st round vs. GCL Yankees (1 game to 0)
1997	25–35	12th (tie)	Luis Dorante	—
1998	32–27	6th	Frank Kremblas	—
1999	29–31	8th (tie)	Bill Masse	—
2000	17–43	12th	Steve Phillips	—
2001	20–40	13th (tie)	Dave Dangler	—
2002	28–32	8th (tie)	Andy Skeels	—
2003	25–33	10th	Bob Henley	—
2004	22–38	11th	Arturo DeFreitas	—

GCL Nationals (2005–2020)
Year	Record	Finish	Manager	Playoffs
2005	21–32	12th	Wendell Kim	—
2006	23–31	10th	Bob Henley	—
2007	23–31	13th	Bob Henley	—
2008	33–22	3rd	Bob Henley	Lost league finals vs. GCL Phillies (2 games to 1); Won in 1st round vs. GCL Twins (1 game to 0)
2009	36–19	2nd	Bob Henley	League champions vs. GCL Marlins (2 games to 0); Won in 1st round vs. GCL Twins (1 game to 0)
2010	24–32	13th (tie)	Bobby Williams	—
2011	20–33	14th	Bobby Williams	—
2012	27–33	11th	Tripp Keister	—
2013	49–9	1st	Patrick Anderson	League champions vs. GCL Red Sox (2 games to 0); Won in first round vs. GCL Pirates (1 game to 0)
2014	25–35	12th (tie)	Michael Barrett	—
2015	24–34	14th	Michael Barrett	—
2016	30–23	4th	Josh Johnson	—
2017	34–22	2nd	Josh Johnson	Lost league finals vs. GCL Yankees (2 games to 1); Won in 1st round vs. GCL Twins (1 game to 0)
2018	23-33	15th	Mario Lisson	—
2019	26-23	8th	Mario Lisson	Playoffs cancelled due to Hurricane Dorian
2020	No Season due to pandemic			
FCL Nationals (2021–present)
2021	26-30	9th	Jake Lowery	—
2022	33-22	4th (tie)	Luis Ordaz	—
2023	24-25	10th	Luis Ordaz	—
2024	25-29	10th	Luis Ordaz	—
2025	30-25	6th	Carmelo Jaime	—
2026	26-27	7th	Carmelo Jaime	—
