= History of the Hagerstown Suns =

The Hagerstown Suns Minor League Baseball team was established in Hagerstown, Maryland, in 1981. The Suns remained in the Carolina League through 1988. In 1989, team ownership purchased the Williamsport Bills franchise of the Double-A Eastern League (EL) and relocated the team to Hagerstown. The Double-A Suns carried on the history of the Class A team that preceded it. After just four seasons, the Eastern League franchise left. The Myrtle Beach Hurricanes franchise of the Class A South Atlantic League (SAL) relocated to Hagerstown for the 1993 season where they became the Suns and continued the previous Suns teams' history.

The Suns' lone league championship was won in their inaugural 1981 season.

== Previous Hagerstown teams ==
=== Cumberland Valley League (1896) ===
Professional baseball has been played in Hagerstown since the late nineteenth century. The Hagerstown Lions played for one season in the independent Cumberland Valley League during 1896. The league began on June 19 and lasted until August 9, when it disbanded due to the disbandment of one of the teams, the Chambersburg Maroons, on August 7. The Lions finished the season in first place with a record of 26–12, three games ahead of Chambersburg. The Lions also dominated statistically, having the league leaders in runs (40 by Natty Nattress), hits (52 by William Graffius), wins by a pitcher (10 by Thomas Lipp), and winning percentage by a pitcher (.833 by Thomas Lipp, with a 10–2 record). Lipp and another Lion, John Gochnaur, were the first Hagerstown players to make it to the major leagues.

=== Blue Ridge League / Middle Atlantic League (1915–1931) ===
In 1915, the Class D Blue Ridge League was formed with its headquarters in Hagerstown. Hagerstown fielded a team for the next 16 seasons. Throughout this time, they won five pennants and donned four different names: the Blues, Terriers, Champs, and Hubs. Before the beginning of the 1931 season, the Blue Ridge League disbanded. The club was then affiliated with the Class C Middle Atlantic League, but on June 28, 1931, the club moved to Parkersburg, West Virginia. The Hagerstown players with the most major league experience during this era were Mike Mowrey (13 major league seasons), Frankie Pytlak (12 major league seasons), and Babe Phelps (11 major league seasons).

=== Interstate League / Piedmont League (1941–1955) ===
Professional baseball returned to Hagerstown in 1941 when Oren E. Sterling moved his Sunbury Indians franchise to town and became a Detroit Tigers affiliate. The newly named Hagerstown Owls (Oren, Win, Luck, and Sterling) joined the Class B Interstate League. Gene Raney purchased the team from Sterling in 1950, and the renamed Hagerstown Braves became an affiliate of the Boston Braves.

The team moved to the Piedmont League in 1953 and once again had a name and affiliation change. The new Washington Senators affiliate, the Hagerstown Packets, competed until the league disbanded after the 1955 season.

== Carolina League (1981–1988) ==
Hagerstown was without a professional team until 1981 when Lou Eliopulos purchased the Rocky Mount Pines Class A Carolina League franchise and moved them north to Hagerstown.

=== Team highlights ===
The team was a co-op affiliate during 1981, with coaches supplied by the Baltimore Orioles and players supplied by several major league clubs to include the Orioles, Chicago Cubs, Cleveland Indians, and Pittsburgh Pirates. The newly named Hagerstown Suns proceeded to win the Carolina League championship in their inaugural season by defeating the Peninsula Pilots.

In 1982, the Suns began a long-term affiliation with the Baltimore Orioles. The 1982 Suns had a better record than the 1981 team, but did not reach the playoffs. For 1983, despite winning 84 games, the Suns finished 10.5 games behind the North Division champion Lynchburg Mets. The winner of the South Division was the Winston-Salem Red Sox, who won 10 games fewer than the Suns. Hagerstown also led the Carolina League in attendance during 1983 with 153,660 fans as compared to Durham's 142,370.

They experienced their first losing season in franchise history in 1984, finishing 30 games behind the first place Lynchburg Mets. One reason may have been the fact the team had three different managers (John Hart, Len Johnston, and Grady Little) during the season. In 1985, the Suns played an exhibition game with the parent club Baltimore Orioles.

The Suns' best overall record in franchise history and a return to the Carolina League championship series came in 1986. However, the Suns would lose the league championship to the Winston-Salem Spirits. The Suns would also make the playoffs in 1987, only to be eliminated in the first round by the eventual league champion Salem Buccaneers.

Despite having the best overall record in the Carolina League North Division in 1988, the Suns did not make the playoffs. This occurred because the Suns did not win either the first or second half. The team that won the North Division championship was the Lynchburg Red Sox, whose overall record was 11 games worse than the Suns.

=== Carolina League records ===
The Suns still hold several Carolina League single-game individual and team records.

- Doubles: Dan Norman, 4 (May 14, 1986) shared with nine others
- Triples: Johnny Tutt, 3 (July 29, 1982) shared with three others
- Grand slams: Dave Falcone, 2 (June 9, 1986) shared with two others
- Runs batted in: Dave Falcone, 11 (June 9, 1986)
- Stolen bases: Johnny Tutt, 5 (August 14, 1982) shared with three others
- Most assists by a shortstop: Randy Strajek, 12 (June 16, 1988) shared with two others
- Most double plays, both teams, extra innings: 10 (August 15, 1986) 5 for Hagerstown and 5 for Kinston in 11 innings
- Most team assists, one game (nine innings): 24 (June 16, 1988) shared with one other team

=== Other individual highlights ===
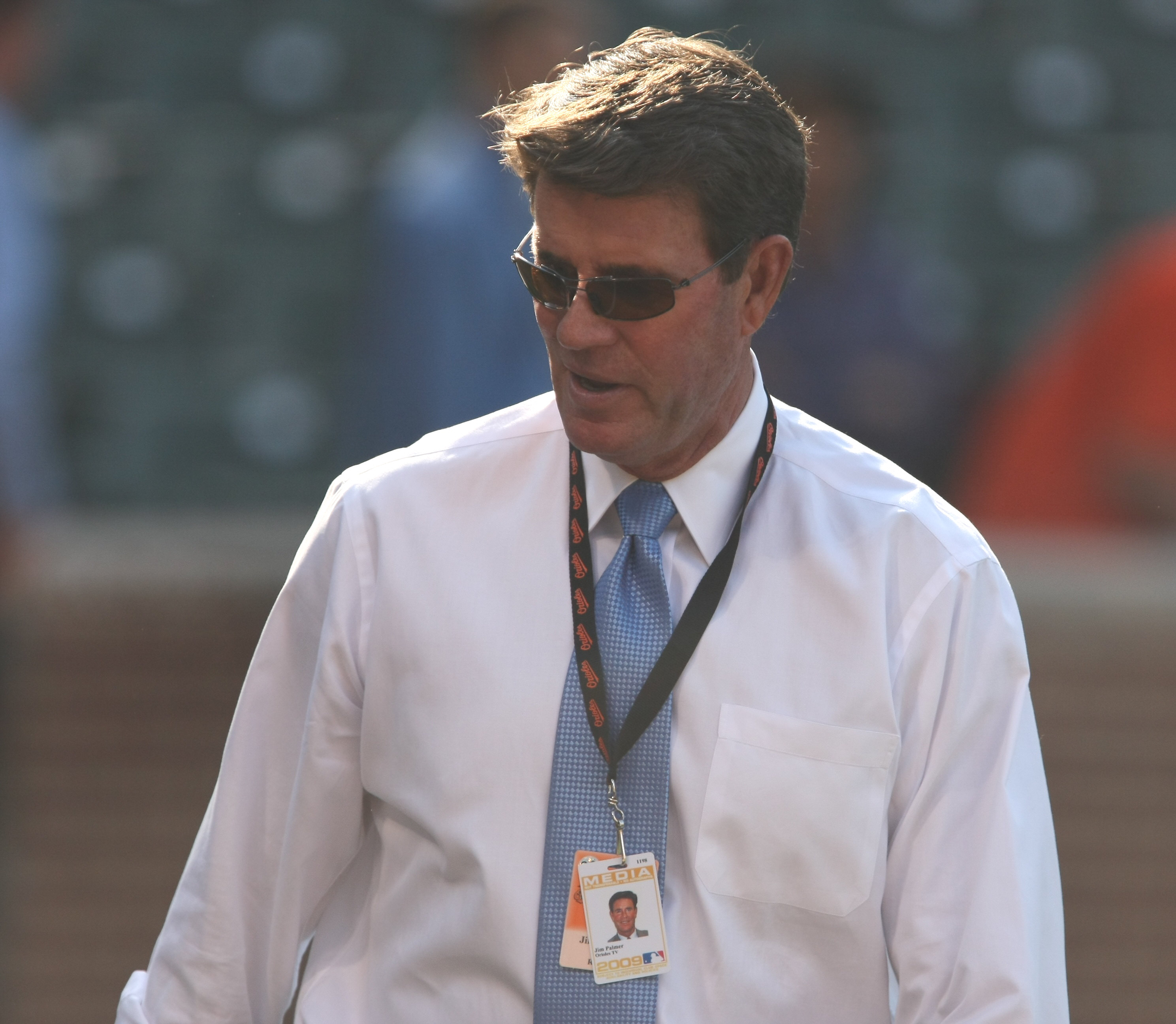
Jim Palmer, shown here in 2009, is the Suns' only Hall of Fame member.

In addition to the Carolina League records, the Suns also had many other individual distinctions during the Carolina League period. Matt Tyner and Ken Gerhart set the club record for season home runs with 31 in 1981 and 1983 respectively. Also in 1983, future Hall of Fame member Jim Palmer made a rehabilitation start for Hagerstown.

Craig Worthington and Pete Stanicek were the standouts in 1986. Worthington set a Suns record with 105 runs batted in (RBIs) and hit 15 home runs. He did this while maintaining a .300 batting average. Meanwhile, Stanicek batted .317 and set a Suns' record (later tied by Don Buford in 1988) by stealing 77 bases, only getting caught 17 times. One other noteworthy player for Suns' fans in 1986 was Mick Billmeyer, a local product from nearby Funkstown. He played the entire 1986 season as the primary back-up to Suns catcher Jeff Tackett.

The 1987 offense was led by Leo Gómez. He batted a league leading .326 with 19 home runs and 110 RBI. Gomez also led the Carolina League in doubles with 38. The ace of the Suns' rotation in 1987 was Blaine Beatty. Beatty went 11–1 with a 2.52 earned run average (ERA) in 13 starts with the Suns before being promoted to Double-A Charlotte. He completed 4 of his starts and allowed just 81 hits in 100 innings. Beatty was also named the 1987 Carolina League Pitcher of the Year.

=== Carolina League All-Stars and season leaders ===
Suns Carolina League End of Season All-Stars
Position	Name	Year	Notes
Pitcher	Beatty, Blaine	1987	Carolina League Pitcher of the Year
Catcher	Eberle, Mike	1988	3 seasons with Hagerstown
First base	Padget, Chris	1985	
Second base	Stanicek, Pete	1986	
Third base	Dumochelle, Pat	1982	
Third base	Worthington, Craig	1986	
Third base	Gómez, Leo	1987	
Shortstop	Smith, D. L.	1985	
Outfielder	Croft, Paul	1981	
Outfielder	Gerhart, Ken	1983	
Outfielder	Cijntje, Sherwin	1986	
Designated hitter	Rivera, David	1981	
Manager	Little, Grady	1981	

Suns Carolina League Season Leaders
Year	Name	Category	Number
1987	Gómez, Leo	Batting average	.326
1986	Worthington, Craig	Runs batted in	105
1983	Salcedo, Ron	Doubles	39
1987	Gomez, Leo	Doubles	37
1987	Richardson, Tim	Triples	9
1983	Gerhart, Ken	Home runs	31
1986	Stanicek, Pete	Stolen bases	77
1988	Buford, Don Jr.	Stolen bases	77
1986	Ballard, Jeff	Earned run average	1.05
1985	Bell, Eric	Strikeouts	162
1987	Sander, Mike	Wins	14
1988	Dubois, Brian	Wins	14 (12 with Suns)

== Eastern League (1989–1992) ==
In 1989, Hagerstown moved up to the Double-A Eastern League, taking over the Williamsport Bills franchise and again affiliating with the Orioles. (The Carolina League franchise relocated down Interstate 70 as the Frederick Keys, maintaining the Orioles' Class A affiliation.) Suns' fans saw some familiar faces as past players such as Leo Gómez, Pete Stanicek, Dave Bettendorf, Ken Dixon, and Brian Dubois returned. On offense, David Segui batted .324 with 1 homerun and 27 RBI in 44 games in his second stint with Hagerstown after being promoted from Frederick. Leo Gómez hit 18 home runs, a team leading total. Suns fans also saw the return of Steve Finley, who came back to Hagerstown via a rehabilitation assignment. In 11 games, Finley hit .417 with 7 RBI and 4 stolen bases. On the pitching side, Mike Linskey was the ace of the starting staff with 10 wins and a 2.81 ERA in 18 starts. Despite his dominance with the Suns, Linskey would never pitch in the major leagues. The Suns finished their first season in Double-A 5 games under .500, and ended up fifth in the then eight team Eastern League. They narrowly missed the playoffs by 3 games and were 24.5 games back of the first place, and eventual league champion, Albany-Colonie Yankees.

George H. W. Bush attended a Suns game as a sitting U.S. President in 1990.

The Suns failed to make the Eastern League playoffs in 1990. While they fell short of that quest, the Suns still had one of their more interesting years. Jack Voigt would contribute mightily to the offense as he batted .256 with a team leading 12 homeruns and 70 RBI. Scott Meadows led the team with 75 RBI. Luis Mercedes batted a league leading .334. He also stole a team leading 38 bases. Three prominent Baltimore Orioles, Sam Horn, Brady Anderson, and Mike Devereaux, made rehabilitation appearances. Anderson stood out the most among the group as he hit .382 in 9 games. The pitching staff was led by Anthony Telford, who went 10–2 with a 1.97 ERA in 13 starts for the Suns, completing 4 games. Another milestone in 1990 was the visit of George H. W. Bush to Municipal Stadium to attend a Hagerstown Suns baseball game. This visit was the first time a sitting President of the United States attended a minor league baseball game.

After back to back losing seasons, the Suns returned to their winning ways in 1991, making their only Eastern League playoff appearance. They finished in second place, only to lose to the eventual league champion Albany-Colonie Yankees in the first round. The offense got power from Paul Carey, who hit a team leading 12 home runs. The Sun's best all around hitter may have been first basemen Ken Shamberg, who hit .275 with 10 homeruns and a team best 82 RBI in 114 games. Top prospect Arthur Rhodes led the pitching staff. Over the course of 19 starts, Rhodes would go 7–4 with a 2.70 ERA and strikeout 115 batters in 106.2 innings, while walking just 47. Rhodes also won the Eastern League Pitcher of the Year Award. He also made his major league debut with the Orioles after being promoted directly from Hagerstown. Stacy Burdick was the leader in pitching wins (11), yet it was the last professional season that he pitched. Burdick went 29–17 combined between 3 stints with Hagerstown including time with the Carolina League franchise as well. Todd Stephen led the team in saves out of the bullpen with 17 and had a 2.12 ERA in 89 innings pitched. Much like the year before, Suns fans saw multiple rehabilitation assignments pass through as Kevin Hickey, Dave Johnson, Bob Milacki, Billy Ripken, and Glenn Davis each had stops in Hagerstown. All of this added to what was by far the Suns best season in the Double-A Eastern League. The Suns also had their all-time highest attendance record, with 193,753 fans passing through the gate.

The team fell short of its quest for the Eastern League playoffs in 1992. Mel Wearing led the team with only 5 homeruns. Scott Meadows would hit .317 in 45 games with the Suns; this proved to be his final year with the Orioles organization. Manny Alexander, the Suns' shortstop, hit .259 and stole a team-leading 43 bases. He did this at the age of 21, young for Double-A baseball. The 1992 season would also complete a unique trifecta for the Suns. In this season, Don Buford managed his son Damon. His other son, Don Jr., had played for the Suns in 1988 and 1989. Don Jr. tied the Suns record for stolen bases by a Suns with 77 in 1988 and would come back in 1989 to steal 30 more. Damon meanwhile, stole 41 bases in 1992 with the Suns. Damon was the only one of the two sons to follow in his father's footsteps by playing in the major leagues.

The Suns' and Keys' owners failed to claim an Eastern League expansion franchise for Bowie in 1993 (coinciding with the Florida Marlins' and Colorado Rockies' addition to the majors). They instead chose to move their existing Hagerstown franchise there as the Bowie Baysox. Hagerstown's relationship with the Baltimore Orioles ended after 1992. Unlike when the Carolina League team had left a few years earlier, there was no guarantee that another team would return to Hagerstown.

Hagerstown would not go without, though. Winston Blenckstone relocated his Myrtle Beach Hurricanes franchise in the Class A South Atlantic League (SAL) to Hagerstown after the 1992 season and promptly renamed them the Suns.

=== Eastern League All-Stars and season leaders ===
Suns Eastern League End of Season All-Stars
Position	Name	Year	Notes
Pitcher	Rhodes, Arthur	1991	Eastern League Pitcher of the Year
Second baseman	Lofton, Rodney	1991	
Third baseman	Gómez, Leo	1989	
Outfielder	Mercedes, Luis	1990	
Outfielder	Meadows, Scott	1990	
Outfielder	Smith, Mark	1992	

Suns Eastern League Season Leaders
Year	Name	Category	Number
1989	Gómez, Leo	Bases on balls	89
1990	Mercedes, Luis	Batting average (min 2.7 PA per team game)	.334
1990	Voigt, Jack	Sacrifice flies	11
1991	Shamburg, Ken	Doubles	9
1991	Lofton, Rodney	Stolen bases	56
1991	Holland, Tim	Struck out	142
1991	Burdick, Stacey	Winning percentage (min 1 decision per 10 team games)	.733 (11-4)
1991	Shamburg, Ken	Double plays grounded into	19
1991	Carey, Paul	Intentional bases on balls received	8 (tied with one other)
1991	Burdick, Stacey	Walks allowed	100
1992	Smith, Mark	Doubles	32

== Major League Baseball (MLB) Players who played for the Carolina League and Eastern League Hagerstown Suns ==
Note: MLB players who played for the South Atlantic League Hagerstown Suns can be found at Hagerstown Suns

List of MLB Players with Carolina League / Eastern League Suns Experience
1981 -1992
**Bold**	MLB All-Star		†	Rehab Assignment		**Bold Italic***	Baseball Hall of Fame Member
Player name	Year(s) with Suns	Player name	Year(s) with Suns	Player name	Year(s) with Suns	Player name	Year(s) with Suns
Manny Alexander	1992	**Brady Anderson**	1990†	Tony Arnold	1982	Jeff Ballard	1986
Blaine Beatty	1987	Eric Bell	1984, 1985, 1989	Mark Brown	1981, 1982	Damon Buford	1992
Paul Carey	1992	Chris Codiroli	1991	**Glenn Davis**	1991†	Storm Davis	1986†
Francisco de la Rosa	1988, 1989, 1990	César Devarez	1992	Mike Devereaux	1990†	Gordon Dillard	1987
Ken Dixon	1981	Tom Dodd	1985	Tim Drummond	1992	Brian Dubois	1986, 1987, 1988, 1989
**Steve Finley**	1987, 1988, 1989†	**Mike Flanagan**	1985†	John Flinn	1985	Ken Gerhart	1983, 1984
Leo Gómez	1987, 1989	Glenn Gulliver	1986†	Ricky Gutiérrez	1991	John Habyan	1982, 1983, 1984
Larry Harlow	1984	**Pete Harnisch**	1987	Kevin Hickey	1991†	Chris Hoiles	1992†
John Hoover	1986	Sam Horn	1990†	Dave Huppert	1981	Dave Johnson	1991†
Ricky Jones	1984	Stacy Jones	1988, 1990, 1991, 1992	Matt Kinzer	1990	Mark Leiter	1983, 1984, 1985
Tom Magrann	1986	Tippy Martinez	1986†	Ben McDonald	1990†	Joel McKeon	1990, 1991
Luis Mercedes	1990	**José Mesa**	1990	Bob Milacki	1987	**Mike Mussina**	1990
Carl Nichols	1981	Dan Norman	1986	John O’Donoghue	1992	**Gregg Olson**	1988
Mike Oquist	1992	**Jim Palmer***	1983†	Al Pardo	1981	John Pawlowski	1992
Brad Pennington	1992	Oswaldo Peraza	1990, 1991	Jeff Pico	1992	Jim Poole	1992†
Mike Raczka	1984	Allan Ramirez	1981	**Arthur Rhodes**	1991	Chuck Ricci	1992
Billy Ripken	1984, 1985, 1991†	Ramón Romero	1981	Luis Rosado	1984	Jeff Schaefer	1982
Erik Schullstrom	1991, 1992	Jeff Schwarz	1989	David Segui	1988, 1989	Larry Sheets	1982
Ken Smith	1986	Mark Smith	1992	Pete Stanicek	1986, 1989, 1990	John Stefero	1981, 1984
Sammy Stewart	1982†	Jeff Tackett	1986	Anthony Telford	1987, 1988, 1990	Jim Traber	1982, 1983, 1984
Shane Turner	1990	Jack Voigt	1987, 1988, 1990, 1991	Don Welchel	1984	Ted Wilborn	1986
Mark Williamson	1992†	Craig Worthington	1986	Ron Wotus	1981		

== All-time individual season records ==
Note: For Single-A Hagerstown Suns individual season records, see Hagerstown Suns.

Double-A Individual Single Season Batting Records
Record	Name	Year	Number
Batting average (min 2.7 PA per league game)	Luis Mercedes	1991	.334
On-base percentage (min 2.7 PA per league game)	Leo Gómez	1989	.402
Slugging percentage (min 2.7 PA per league game)	Leo Gómez	1989	.467
On-base plus slugging percentage (OPS) (min 2.7 PA per league game)	Leo Gómez	1991	.869
At bats	Tim Holland	1991	501
Runs	Rodney Loftin	1991	78
Hits	Scott Meadows	1990	145
Total bases	Leo Gómez	1989	209
Doubles	Ken Shamburg	1991	36
Home runs	Leo Gómez	1989	18
Triples	Manny Alexander	1992	7
RBI	Ken Shamburg	1991	82
Walks	Leo Gómez	1989	89
Strikeouts	Tim Holland	1991	142
Stolen bases	Rodney Loftin	1991	56
Hit by pitch	Scott Meadows; Doug Robbins	1991; 1991	9
Sacrifice hits	Rodney Loftin	1990	10
Sacrifice flies	Jack Voigt	1990	11
Intentional walks	Paul Carey; Brent Miller	1991; 1992	8
Grounded into double plays	Ken Shamburg	1991	19
Most games	Scott Meadows	1990	138

Double-A Individual Single Season Pitching Records
Record	Name	Year	Number
Earned run average (ERA) (0.8 IP per league game)	Francisco de la Rosa	1990	2.06
Wins	Stanley Burdick	1991	11
Walks and hits per inning pitched (WHIP) (0.8 IP per league game)	Brian Dubois	1989	.991
Hits allowed/9IP (0.8 IP per league game)	John O'Donaghue	1992	6.2
Walks/9IP (0.8 IP per league game)	Brian Dubois	1989	1.4
Strikeouts/9IP (0.8 IP per league game)	Eric Schullstrom	1992	9.1
Saves	Todd Stephan	1991	14
Innings	Mike Oquist	1991	166.1
Strikeouts	Mike Oquist	1991	136
Complete games	Mike Linskey	1989	7
Shutouts	Mike Linskey	1989	4
Walks allowed	Stanley Burdick	1991	100
Hits allowed	Mike Oquist	1991	168
Strikeout to walk (0.8 IP per league game)	Brian Dubois	1990	4.56
Losses	Chris Myers	1990	11
Earned runs allowed	Mike Oquist	1991	75
Wild pitches	Jeff Williams	1992	15
Hit batsmen	David Miller	1990	7
Batters faced	Mike Oquist	1991	717
Games finished	Todd Stephan	1991	40

== All-time team career leaders ==
Note: These records cover all Hagerstown Suns teams from 1981 to 2019.

Suns Career Batting Records
Record	Name	Number
Games	Robert Latmore	350
At bats	Robert Latmore	1216
Runs	Ken Gerhart; Don Buford	170
Hits	Robert Latmore	297
Total bases	Leo Gómez	460
Doubles	Brett Newsome	62
Home runs	Matthew Tyner	40
Triples	Timothy Richardson	17
RBI	Leo Gómez	188
Walks	Leo Gómez	184
Strikeouts	Leo Gómez	187
Stolen bases	Don Buford	119
Singles	Timothy Richardson	224
Extra-base hits	Leo Gómez	103
Hit by pitch	Rob Mummau	16
Sacrifice hits	Rodney Loftin	22
Sacrifice flies	Ken Shamburg	16
Intentional walks	Paul Carey; Dave Bettendorf	13
Grounded into double plays	Ken Holland	25

Suns Career Pitching Records
Record	Name	Number
Wins	Stanley Burdick	27
Saves	Jackson Markert	39
Innings	Brian Dubois	422
Strikeouts	Stanley Burdick	335
Games started	Brian Dubois	64
Complete games	Brian Dubois	16
Shutouts	Mike Linskey	4
Home runs allowed	Trevor Mallory; Mike Sander	30
Walks allowed	Stanley Burdick	243
Hits allowed	Brian Dubois	413
Losses	Michael Sander	27
Earned runs allowed	Brian Dubois	169
Wild pitches	Joe Casey	29
Hit batsmen	Marcos Sandoval	30
Games finished	Paul Thorpe	98

== Suns team records ==
Note: These records cover all Hagerstown Suns teams from 1981 to 2019.

Suns High-Low Team Season Hitting Records
Record	High (Year)	Low (Year)
Runs scored	842 (1986)	505 (2003)
Hits	1339 (1986)	1017 (1985)
Doubles	293 (1997)	179 (1989)
Triples	51 (1994)	16 (2006)
Home runs	158 (1983)	32 (1992)
Runs batted in	762 (1986)	447 (2003)
Stolen bases	236 (1986)	88 (2004)
Bases on balls	671 (1983)	371 (1997)
Strikeouts	1173 (1995)	676 (1986)
Batting average	0.290 (1986)	0.234 (1985)
On-base percentage	0.379 (1995)	0.312 (1992)
Slugging percentage	0.443 (1981)	0.325 (1985)
Total bases	2011 (1981)	1412 (1985)
Hit by pitch	97 (2004, 2005)	23 (1985)

Suns High-Low Team Season Pitching Records
Record	High (Year)	Low (Year)
Earned run average	4.80 (2004)	3.09 (2003)
Complete games	35 (1983)	0 (2009, 2014)
Shutouts	16 (2003, 2013)	1 (2004)
Saves	53 (1994)	17 (1982)
Hits allowed	1316 (2010)	953 (2006)
Runs allowed	766 (2007)	487 (2003)
Earned runs allowed	632 (2004)	401 (2003)
Home runs allowed	114 (2005)	51 (1990)
Base on balls allowed	689 (1981)	358 (2011)
Strikeouts	1179 (2003)	814 (1989)
Hit batsmen	121 (2005)	24 (1991)
Balks	26 (1992)	2 (2004)
Wild pitches	118 (2010)	41 (1990)
Walks and hits per inning pitched	1.544 (1981)	1.170 (2003)

Suns High-Low Team Season Fielding Records
Record	High (Year)	Low (Year)
Putouts	3786 (1999)	3457 (1984)
Assists	1593 (1999)	1249 (1991)
Errors	249 (1981)	118 (2014)
Fielding percentage	97.8 (2014)	95.2 (1981)
Passed balls	43 (1996)	12 (2014)

== Hagerstown Suns Carolina League and Eastern League Season-by-Season Record ==
Suns Carolina and Eastern Leagues Season-by-Season Record
Season	Class	League	Division	Affiliation	Manager	Record	Finish	Postseason
1981	A	Carolina	Northern	Co-op	Grady Little	70–68	1st Half: 1st (37–31); 2nd Half: 3rd (22–27)	Defeated Salem, 1–0, Northern Division Championship; Defeated Peninsula, 3–0, in league championship
1982	A	Carolina	Northern	Baltimore	Grady Little	71–65	1st Half: 2nd (38–29); 2nd Half: 3rd (33–36)	—
1983	A	Carolina	Northern	Baltimore	John Hart	84–52	1st Half: 2nd (41–25); 2nd Half: 2nd (43–27)	—
1984	A	Carolina	Northern	Baltimore	Grady Little; Len Johnston; John Hart	60–80	1st Half: 3rd (32-38); 2nd Half: 4th (28–42)	—
1985	A	Carolina	Northern	Baltimore	Greg Biagini	65–72	1st Half: 2nd (41–28); 2nd Half: 4th (24–44)	—
1986	A	Carolina	Northern	Baltimore	Bob Molinaro	91–48	1st Half: 1st (46–24); 2nd Half: 1st (45–24)	Lost to Winston-Salem, 3–1, in league championship
1987	A	Carolina	Northern	Baltimore	Bob Molinaro	72–68	1st Half: 1st (40–30); 2nd Half: 3rd (32–38)	Lost to Salem, 2–0, in Northern Division Championship
1988	A	Carolina	Northern	Baltimore	Mike Hart	79–61	1st Half: 2nd (37–33); 2nd Half: 2nd (42–28)	—
1989	AA	Eastern	–	Baltimore	Jimmy Schaffer	67–72	5th	—
1990	AA	Eastern	–	Baltimore	Jerry Narron	67–71	6th	—
1991	AA	Eastern	–	Baltimore	Jerry Narron	81–59	2nd	Lost to Albany-Colonie in first round, 3–0
1992	AA	Eastern	–	Baltimore	Don Buford	59–80	7th	—
