= United States National Slavery Museum =

Museum proposal in Fredericksburg, VA

Coordinates: 38.3227034°N 77.508738°W

The United States National Slavery Museum was an unfunded proposal for a museum to commemorate American slavery.

== Fredericksburg proposal ==
In 2001 a non-profit organization was founded in Fredericksburg, Virginia, to raise funds and campaign to establish a national museum on slavery in America.

On October 8, 2001, Douglas Wilder, mayor of Richmond, Virginia, announced his intention to build a National Slavery Museum in Fredericksburg, on 38 acres donated by the Silver Company at the Celebrate Virginia Retail and Tourism complex. The site overlooks the Rappahannock River and is located less than one mile from Interstate 95 (the principal North-South artery for the U.S. East Coast). Originally projected to open in 2004, the museum was to be part of the state's "Celebrate Virginia" development along the busy I-95 travel corridor between Richmond and Washington DC.

In 2005 the Fredericksburg City Council set a deadline to begin construction by August 1, 2008, in order for the project to retain its special-use permit (allowing the planned building to exceed zoning restrictions on height.) The museum project made its last tax payment on May 15, 2008, and the following day the executive director wrote the City Council to request to delay construction for one year (until August 2009). In June 2008, appeared before the City Council to ask for an exemption to pay real-estate taxes (retroactive to 2002), but this request was denied on June 24, 2008, by a vote of 6-1. By the end of the year the project's leased offices in Fredericksburg were reported to be vacant. The local Fredericksburg newspaper reported in February 2009 that the offices had never had much staff beyond Executive Director Vonita Foster and one assistant.

The museum was intended to have as its primary mission education, re-education, and policy formation regarding slavery in America and its enduring legacy. Former Virginia Governor Douglas Wilder is the museum project's founder. The project, effectively, died in 2008 due to its inability to raise sufficient funds to pay property taxes, let alone begin construction. On September 22, 2011, the organization filed for Chapter 11 protection in U.S. Bankruptcy Court in Fredericksburg. In early 2011 museum founder, Douglas Wilder, was refusing to respond to or answer any questions from either news reporters or patrons who had donated artifacts.

Work ceased in 2007 with the dedication of a small (one-third acre) Spirit of Freedom Garden. In June 2008 the museum was denied tax-exempt status. From that time, taxes on the land had not been paid and the property was at risk of being sold at auction by the city of Fredericksburg.

According to a news report in mid-August 2011, the museum property has an assessed value of $7.6 million, and delinquent property taxes for the years 2009, 2010, and 2011 amount to just over $215,000. Virginia tax authorities said the property became eligible to be sold as a tax sale on December 31, 2010. Official notification of the commonwealth's intent to sell the property was planned for late August 2011, but a tax official said it was unlikely "anything would really happen" for six months (until early 2012), and the planned tax sale would be dropped if taxes were paid. But then the organization filed for Chapter 11 protection in September, although it remains unclear if the purpose was reorganization or liquidation.

On October 21, 2013, the Hagerstown Suns and Diamond Nation finalized an agreement to purchase the land of the proposed museum property. Under the deal, the city of Fredericksburg will receive $450,000 in back taxes owed from the US National Slavery Museum's failure to pay its taxes.

== Richmond plan ==
In 2024 Mayor Levar Stoney announced The Shockoe Project, including the National Slavery Museum. The City of Richmond set aside Ten Acres in Shockoe Valley to tell the history of slavery and freedom in Richmond. More than $40 million in state, city, and foundation money was made available, the first $11 million having been set aside by Governor Bob McDonnell in 2011. The first piece of the project, the Shockoe Institute, will open on the ground floor of the Main Street Station in 2025. It will be followed by the excavation of the former Lumpkin's Slave Jail and the opening of a Pavilion telling its story. The African Burial Ground and a memorial to 300,000 persons sold and "shipped downriver" in the period from 1830 to 1860, will be set aside. And finally, a 62,000 square foot National Slavery Museum will be constructed. The Shockoe Project is underway and is expected to take ten years to complete.

== See also ==
- National Slave Memorial
- Slavery in the United States
- List of museums focused on African Americans
- International Slavery Museum, Liverpool, UK
