= Brian Rupp =

Brian Rupp (born September 20, 1971) is former baseball player and a coach for the Inland Empire 66ers in the Los Angeles Angels organization, he resides in Florissant, MO with his wife Stacie and son Andrew. His resume also boasts five playoff appearances, two trips to a league final and one championship.

== Baseball Career ==
After attending UM-St. Louis, Rupp was drafted by the St. Louis Cardinals in the 43rd round of the 1992 draft. He played for seven seasons in the St. Louis Cardinals minor league system, mostly as a first baseman and outfielder, and reached as high as the Triple-A level. The former University of Missouri-St. Louis Riverman won both the Arizona League batting title and MVP award in his first professional season. He also collected the South Atlantic League batting crown in 1993 beating out Derek Jeter. He went on to hit .295 over 742 career games.

After his playing career, Rupp joined the Cardinals minor league coaching staff and served as manager for Low-A Peoria (1999), Short-Season New Jersey (2001) and Rookie Johnson City (2002). He also spent the 2000 season as hitting coach for Double-A Arkansas. After joining the Royals organization, he managed Idaho Falls Chukars from 2004 to 2007 before mentoring the Burlington Bees in 2008 during which Rupp led the Royals' Low A affiliate to a 73–65 regular-season record and their first Midwest League Championship since 1999. Under his tutelage, the Bees went from being the worst team in their division over the first half (30–39) to a league-best record and division title in the second half (43–26), winning the half crown by 3.5 games. The team played its best baseball in the final month of the season. Including a 6–0 playoff record, the Bees went 27–9 from August 1 on. The Midwest League named the Bees champions in a rain-shortened finale. In 2009 Rupp managed the Wilmington Blue Rocks to an 84–55 record and Northern Division Championship before losing to the eventual Carolina League Champion Lynchburg Hillcats in game 5 of the semi-finals playoff series. His team set franchise records for consecutive road wins by winning 12 straight games during the 2009 season. Rupp left the Royals organization after the 2010 season, switching affiliations to the Washington Nationals organization. The 2012 campaign was Rupp's first season in the Nationals organization and twelfth as a minor league manager. His career managerial record at the time sat at 579-560 (.508). After over a decade with the Nats, including several years as hitting coach for the Potomac Nationals, Rupp was hired by the Angels in early 2024.

Preceded by Jeff Shireman	Peoria Chiefs Manager; 1999	Succeeded by Tom Lawless
Preceded by N/A	Arkansas Travelers Hitting Coach; 2000	Succeeded by Mark Budaska
Preceded by Jeff Shireman	New Jersey Cardinals Manager; 2001	Succeeded by Tommy Shields
Preceded by Chris Maloney	Johnson City Cardinals Manager; 2002	Succeeded by Ron Warner
Preceded by Carlos Lezcano	Idaho Falls Chukars Manager; 2004–2007	Succeeded by Jim Gabella
Preceded by Jim Gabella	Burlington Bees Manager; 2008	Succeeded by Jim Gabella
Preceded by Darryl Kennedy	Wilmington Blue Rocks Manager; 2009–2011	Succeeded by Vance Wilson
Preceded by Matt LeCroy	Potomac Nationals Manager; 2012	Succeeded by Brian Daubach
Preceded by Mark Harris (baseball)	Hagerstown Suns Hitting Coach; 2013	Succeeded by Luis Ordaz
Preceded by Mark Harris (baseball)	Potomac Nationals Hitting Coach; 2014–2015	Succeeded by Luis Ordaz
Preceded by Mark Harris (baseball)	Harrisburg Senators Hitting Coach; 2016 -	Succeeded by TBD
