= National Slavery Museum =

National Slavery Museum may refer to:

- National Museum of Slavery, in Luanda, Angola
- United States National Slavery Museum, an unfunded proposal

== See also ==
- International Slavery Museum, in Liverpool, England
