= Brian Daubach =

American baseball player & coach (born 1972)

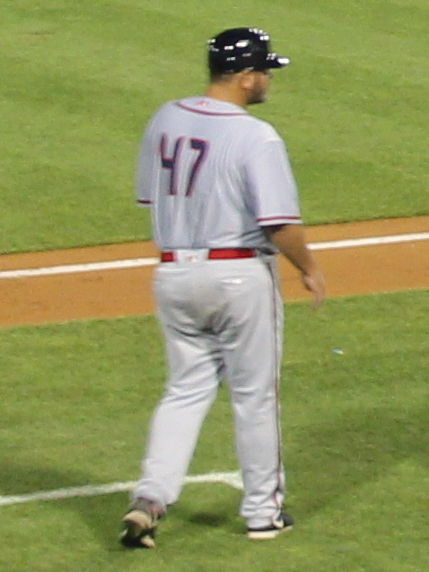
- Daubach with the Syracuse Chiefs in 2017
- First baseman
- Born: February 11, 1972 (age 54); Belleville, Illinois, U.S.
- Batted: Left Threw: Right

MLB debut
- September 10, 1998, for the Florida Marlins

Last MLB appearance
- July 8, 2005, for the New York Mets

MLB statistics
- Batting average: .259
- Home runs: 93
- Runs batted in: 333
- Stats at Baseball Reference

Teams
- Florida Marlins (1998); Boston Red Sox (1999–2002); Chicago White Sox (2003); Boston Red Sox (2004); New York Mets (2005)

Brian Michael Daubach (born February 11, 1972) is an American former professional baseball player and current hitting coach for the Rochester Red Wings. He played in Major League Baseball (MLB) for the Florida Marlins, Boston Red Sox, Chicago White Sox, and New York Mets. During his playing career Daubach served as a first baseman, outfielder, and designated hitter.

== Playing career ==
Daubach was selected by the Mets in the 17th round of the 1990 amateur draft. He toiled for seven years in the Mets' minor league system without breaking through to the majors before being granted free agency. In 1997, he signed with the Florida Marlins organization and made his major league debut in 1998. Later, he played for the Boston Red Sox and Chicago White Sox.

During his time with the Red Sox, Daubach was involved in a bench-clearing brawl that occurred during a game between Boston and the Tampa Bay Devil Rays on August 29, 2000. During the fight, Daubach unintentionally injured teammate Lou Merloni, who had to go to the hospital for treatment. As the game continued, Devil Rays pitchers went on to throw at Daubach six times, hitting him twice. In all, eight members of the Devil Rays team were ejected from the game, which Boston won, with Red Sox pitcher Pedro Martínez nearly throwing a no-hitter.

Daubach started 2005 with the Norfolk Tides, a Triple-A affiliate of the Mets in the International League. On June 16, 2005, he finally made his debut with the club that drafted him 15 years earlier. He played for the Memphis Redbirds, the AAA-affiliate of the St. Louis Cardinals in 2006.

Statistically, Daubach's best seasons were with the Red Sox; he averaged 21 homers and 75 RBI per year, and gained a reputation as a "Dirt Dog" for his style of play. He later received a World Series ring as a member of the 2004 Boston Red Sox. In his seven-season major league career, he compiled a .259 batting average with 93 home runs and 333 RBI in 661 games.

On April 8, 2008, Daubach represented the 2004 Red Sox champions during the ring ceremony for the 2007 Red Sox champions.

== Post-playing career ==
On June 30, 2008 Brian Daubach was named the hitting coach for the Nashua Pride, coaching his first game July 1. Although the Pride went on to a losing season, Brian Daubach was named the manager of their successor team, the American Defenders of New Hampshire in November 2008.

Brian appeared on WEEI as one of the co-hosts of The Big Show and on Comcast cable for sports commentary. He also appeared on Fox Sports Net in St. Louis when he covered the 2006 World Series between the Cardinals and the Tigers.

On November 9, 2010 Daubach was named as the minor-league manager of the Hagerstown, MD Suns, a Single-A affiliate of the Washington Nationals.

In December 2012, the Nationals organization named Daubach as manager of the Potomac Nationals, the team's high A affiliate.

In December 2013, he was named manager of the Harrisburg Senators, the team's Double-A affiliate.

In 2018 he was named as the hitting coach for the Syracuse Chiefs.

In 2021 he was named as the hitting coach for the Rochester Red Wings.

== See also ==
- List of Major League Baseball replacement players

Preceded by Rick Miller (Nashua Pride)	American Defenders of New Hampshire/Pittsfield Colonials Manager; 2009–2010	Succeeded by Jamie Keefe
Preceded by Matt LeCroy	Hagerstown Suns Manager; 2011–2012	Succeeded by Tripp Keister
Preceded by Brian Rupp	Potomac Nationals Manager; 2013	Succeeded by Tripp Keister
Preceded by Matt LeCroy	Harrisburg Senators Manager; 2014–2015	Succeeded by Matt LeCroy
