= Blaine Beatty =

American baseball player and coach (born 1964)

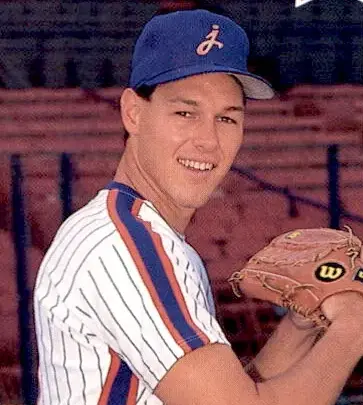
- Beatty with the Jackson Mets c. 1988
- Pitcher
- Born: April 25, 1964 (age 61); Victoria, Texas
- Batted: Left Threw: Left

MLB debut
- September 16, 1989, for the New York Mets

Last MLB appearance
- September 30, 1991, for the New York Mets

MLB statistics
- Win–loss record: 0–0
- Earned run average: 2.30
- Strikeouts: 10
- Stats at Baseball Reference

Teams
- New York Mets (1989, 1991)

Gordon Blaine Beatty (born April 25, 1964) is an American former professional baseball pitcher. He played in Major League Baseball (MLB) for the New York Mets in 1989 and 1991. After retiring as a player, he became a minor league pitching coach in 1998 and currently coaches the Single-A Spokane Indians.

== Playing career ==
=== Minor league career ===
Beatty was a first-round pick by the Baltimore Orioles in 1984 out of San Jacinto College, but did not sign. He was later a ninth-round draft pick in 1986 by the Baltimore Orioles out of Baylor University and did sign.

He spent 12 seasons in the minors, compiling a record of 121–69 with a 3.26 Earned Run Average (ERA). During the 1987 season with the Hagerstown Suns, Beatty went 11–1 with a 2.52 ERA in 13 starts. He completed four of his starts and allowed just 81 hits in 100 innings. In addition to having the highest winning percentage (.917) for the Carolina League that year, Beatty was named the Carolina League Pitcher of the Year.

In December 1987, Beatty was traded to the New York Mets for reliever Doug Sisk.

=== Major league career ===
Beatty spent parts of two seasons in the majors with the New York Mets. He made seven major league appearances with the Mets between 1989 and 1991 (he was injured in 1990). After returning to the minor leagues, he retired as a player after the 1997 season. Beatty was a replacement player for the Cincinnati Reds during the 1994–95 MLB strike.

== Coaching career ==
Beatty was a pitching coach in the Pittsburgh Pirates system from 1998 to 2002 and the New York Mets system from 2003 to 2005. He joined the Baltimore Orioles organization in 2006. He spent the 2006 to 2008 seasons with the Frederick Keys as their pitching instructor. He was the pitching coach for the 2009 Delmarva Shorebirds before returning to the Frederick Keys for the 2010 through 2012 seasons. Beatty moved up to become the pitching coach for the Bowie Baysox for the 2013 and 2014 seasons. Blaine then returned to Delmarva for another stint as the Shorebirds pitching coach for the 2015 and 2016 seasons. Blaine was named the pitching coach for the Frederick Keys for the 2017 and 2018 seasons.

Prior to the 2021 season, the Colorado Rockies hired Beatty to be pitching coach for the Triple-A Albuquerque Isotopes. A year later, Beatty joined the Hartford Yard Goats, the Rockies' Double-A affiliate, also as pitching coach. He became the Single-A Spokane Indians pitching coach in 2024.

Beatty speaks Spanish, which he uses to help his players from Latin America transition to life in the United States.

== Personal life ==
Beatty's wife gave birth to their first son six days before Beatty's major league debut. The Beattys homeschooled their son while Beatty bounced around the minor leagues.
