= Matthew LeCroy =

American baseball player & coach (born 1975)

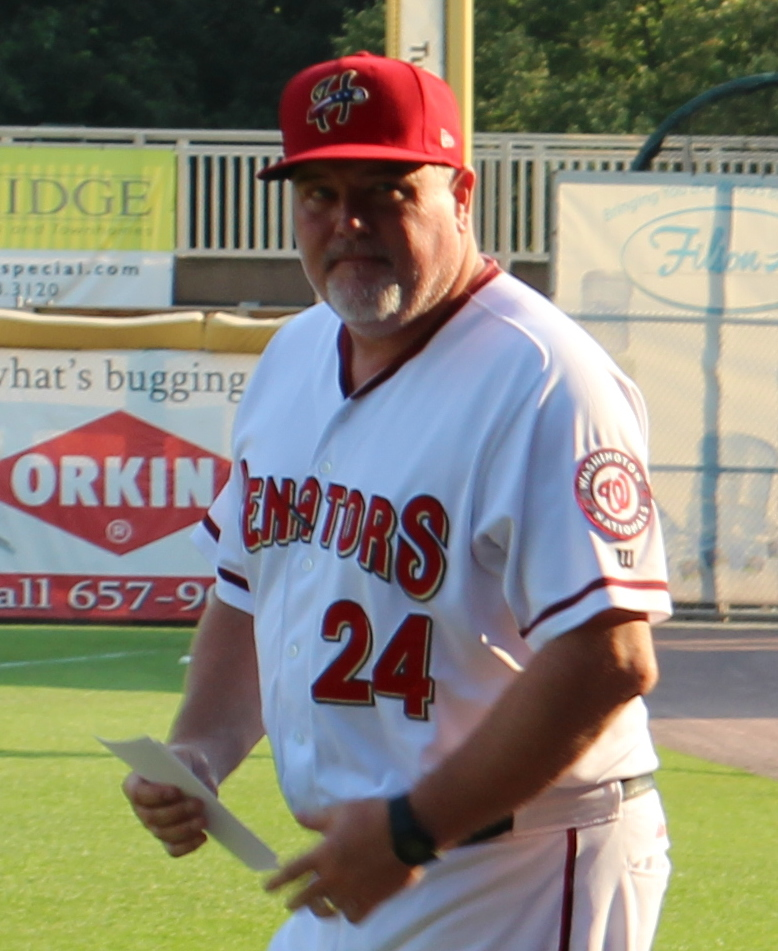
- LeCroy with the Harrisburg Senators in 2018
- Designated hitter / Catcher / First baseman
- Born: December 13, 1975 (age 50); Belton, South Carolina, U.S.
- Batted: Right Threw: Right

MLB debut
- April 3, 2000, for the Minnesota Twins

Last MLB appearance
- September 30, 2007, for the Minnesota Twins

MLB statistics
- Batting average: .260
- Home runs: 60
- Runs batted in: 218
- Stats at Baseball Reference

Teams
- Minnesota Twins (2000–2005); Washington Nationals (2006); Minnesota Twins (2007)
Medals
Men's baseball
Representing United States
Olympic Games
Bronze medal – third place	1996 Atlanta	Team
Pan American Games
Silver medal – second place	1999 Winnipeg	Team

Matthew Hanks LeCroy (born December 13, 1975) is an American former professional baseball catcher, first baseman, and designated hitter. He is currently the manager of the Rochester Red Wings, the Triple-A affiliate of the Washington Nationals.

During his eight-year career in Major League Baseball (MLB), LeCroy had the dubious honor of being the active player with the most plate appearances without a stolen base.

== Career ==
=== Amateur ===
LeCroy is a 1994 graduate of Belton-Honea Path High School in Honea Path, South Carolina and attended Clemson University to pursue a degree in elementary education. While at Clemson, he was named to the 1996 U.S. Olympic Baseball Team and helped the team to a bronze medal after losing to both Cuba (gold medal) and Japan (silver medal) before defeating Nicaragua in the bronze medal game.

=== Minnesota Twins ===
In 1997, LeCroy was drafted as a catcher in the first round (50th overall) of the Major League Baseball draft by the Minnesota Twins. Although challenged defensively behind the plate, averaging double-digit passed balls while throwing out less than 30 percent of potential base stealers, LeCroy put up superior power numbers in the minor leagues, hitting 101 home runs over five years in the Twins' system. In 1999, LeCroy again competed at the international level when he played for the United States at the 1999 Pan American Games in Winnipeg, Manitoba. The United States took second place behind Cuba in games made notable as the first time professional baseball players were allowed to compete in international games.

LeCroy got his first taste of the majors in 2000 when he made the major-league club out of spring training. From 2000 to 2002, LeCroy split time between the Twins and their Triple–A teams, playing for the Salt Lake Buzz and later the Edmonton Trappers after the Twins changed their minor-league affiliate in 2001. Due to his struggles behind the plate, LeCroy also spent time at first base and designated hitter; totaling more games in the major leagues at the latter position than he did at first base and catcher combined. His peak years in the majors were 2003 (.287, 17 HR, 64 RBI in 107 games) and 2005 (.260, 17 HR, 50 RBI in 101 games).

=== Washington Nationals ===
Despite his productive 2005 season, Minnesota did not re-sign LeCroy and he signed a minor-league contract with the Washington Nationals on February 8, 2006.

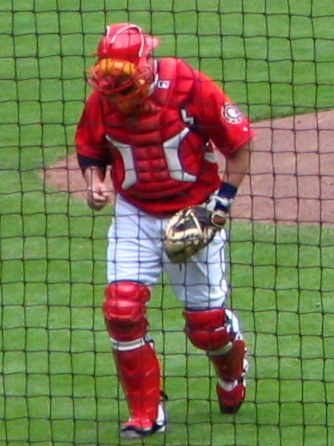
LeCroy with the Nationals in 2006

Despite bone spurs in his throwing knee, LeCroy was asked to fill in during a May 25, 2006, game against the Houston Astros when Washington's starting catcher Brian Schneider and backup Wiki Gonzalez were out with injuries. He was replaced by utilityman Robert Fick in the middle of the seventh inning after the Astros stole seven bases and LeCroy committed two catching errors. After the game, manager Frank Robinson shed tears during the press conference regarding his removal of Matt in the middle of the seventh inning, which is usually considered embarrassing. LeCroy was designated for assignment July 18, which he accepted, and spent the rest of the year playing for the New Orleans Zephyrs, then Washington's Triple–A affiliate team.

=== Minnesota Twins (second stint) ===
LeCroy was signed to a minor-league deal by the Twins on January 15, 2007 after turning down an offer from the Washington Nationals to manage one of their minor-league teams. LeCroy started the 2007 season as designated hitter playing for the Rochester Red Wings in the International League. He had his contract purchased by the major-league club on September 9, 2007, when their fourth catcher José Morales went down with an injury, and finished the season with the Twins.

LeCroy was outrighted to the minor leagues by the Twins on October 11, 2007, but he refused the assignment and became a free agent.

As a member of the Twins, LeCroy became one of the few major leaguers to pinch hit a walk-off grand slam in a win over the Toronto Blue Jays. He was always a threat to hit a home run, and hit 60 in 472 games over his eight-year major-league career.

=== Lancaster Barnstormers ===
On February 15, 2008, LeCroy signed a minor league contract with an invitation to spring training with the Oakland Athletics. On March 16, 2008, LeCroy was reassigned to minor-league camp and asked the Athletics to grant his release, which they did. LeCroy then signed with the Lancaster Barnstormers of the independent Atlantic League of Professional Baseball in April 2008. LeCroy played 94 games with Lancaster (hitting .326 with 22 HR and 83 RBI) before retiring at the end of the season.

== Coaching career ==
In November 2008, LeCroy was hired by the Nationals to manage the team's Class A affiliate, the Hagerstown Suns. In 2011, LeCroy was moved up to the High Single-A Carolina League when he was named as the manager of the Potomac Nationals. In 2012, he was named the Double A Harrisburg Senators manager. In November 2013, he was named the bullpen coach on new Nationals manager Matt Williams' coaching staff, replacing Jim Lett. He was fired with Williams and the entire coaching staff after the 2015 season, but was brought back for his second stint as manager of the Harrisburg Senators for the 2016 season.

The Nationals announced December 15, 2020, that LeCroy was being promoted to manager of the Class-AAA Rochester Red Wings.

== Personal life ==
LeCroy and his wife Holly have five children, daughter Isabella (b. 2004), daughter Maggie (b. 2006), a son, and fraternal twins.

Preceded by Darnell Coles	Hagerstown Suns Manager; 2009-2010	Succeeded by Brian Daubach
Preceded by Gary Cathcart	Potomac Nationals Manager; 2011	Succeeded by Brian Rupp
Preceded by Tony Beasley	Harrisburg Senators Manager; 2012-2013	Succeeded by Brian Daubach
Preceded by Jim Lett	Washington Nationals Bullpen Coach; 2014–2015	Succeeded by Dan Firova
Preceded by Brian Daubach	Harrisburg Senators Manager; 2016-	Succeeded by TBD
