= Tripp Keister =

American baseball player, coach, and manager

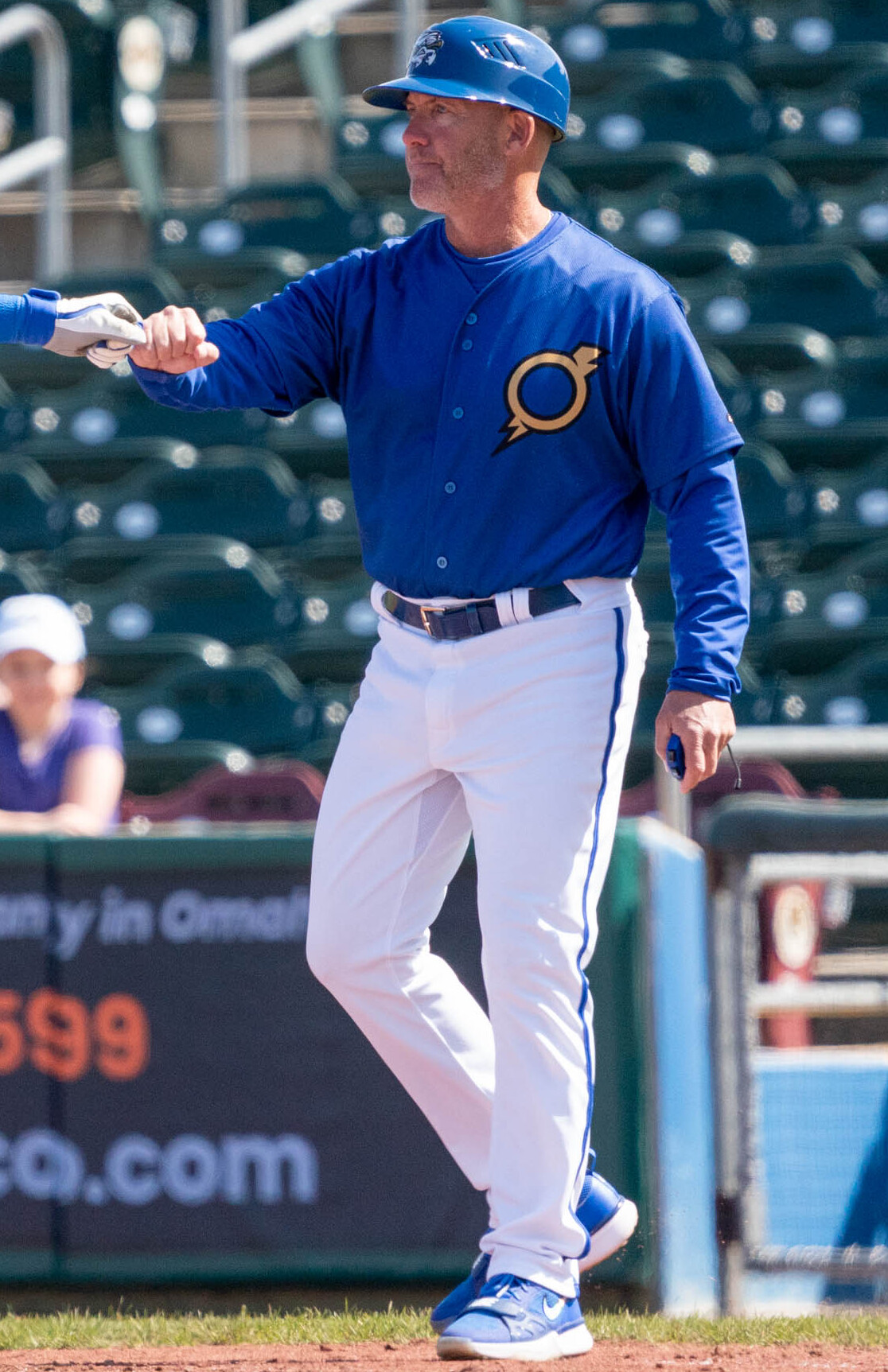
- Keister with the Omaha Storm Chasers in 2024

Biographical details
- Born: September 27, 1970 (age 56); West Germany
- Education: University of Delaware; Wesley College

Coaching career (HC unless noted)
- 1996–1998: South Carolina (assistant)
- 1999–2000: Delaware State
- 2006–2011: Wesley

Accomplishments and honors

Awards
- PAC Coach of the Year (2006)

Donald Carl "Tripp" Keister (born September 27, 1970) is an American professional baseball coach with the Omaha Storm Chasers, the Triple-A minor league affiliate of the Kansas City Royals.

== Career ==
=== As a player ===
As an outfielder at the University of Delaware, Keister was a 33rd-round draft pick of the New York Mets in the 1992 Major League Baseball draft. He turned pro and played four seasons in the Mets minor league system, topping out with the Class-AA Binghamton Mets.

Keister amassed a career batting average of .269, but he only managed two home runs across four minor league seasons before he retired from playing.

=== As a coach ===
After leaving professional baseball, Keister latched on with the University of South Carolina as an assistant coach from 1996 to 1998. He was hired as head coach at Delaware State University, a role he filled from 1999 to 2000. For several years, he returned to professional baseball as a scout for the San Diego Padres, before returning to DSU for an 18-month stint as associate athletic director for development. He became head coach at Wesley College, a private liberal arts college in Dover, Delaware, for the 2006 season. He won Coach of the Year honours in his first season after leading the team to a 22–19 record, their first winning record in 5 years. He served in that role, and as the school's associate athletic director, until 2011.

The Washington Nationals hired Keister after five years coaching at Wesley College. He was named manager of the Gulf Coast League Nationals in 2012 and the Class-A Hagerstown Suns in 2013, before he was promoted to Class-A Advanced as manager of the Potomac Nationals. In December 2020, with the minor league Nationals—since relocated to Fredericksburg, Virginia, as the Fredericksburg Nationals—being relegated to Class-A play, the Nationals promoted Keister again to serve as coach of their Class-AA affiliate, the Harrisburg Senators. Keister was fired from the Nationals organization in September 2022 by De Jon Watson, director of player development.

Keister spent the 2023 season as the bench coach for the Double-A Frisco RoughRiders in the Texas Rangers organization. For the 2024 season, he was assistant coach of the Omaha Storm Chasers, the Triple-A affiliate of the Kansas City Royals. In 2025, Keister was assistant coach of the Royals Single-A affiliate, the Columbia Fireflies. In 2026, he was promoted to be an assistant coach for the Omaha Storm Chasers the Royals Triple-A affiliate.

== Personal life ==
Keister grew up in Hockessin, Delaware, one of five children in his family. Judy Johnson, a Hall of Famer who played for 17 seasons in the Negro leagues, was his father's next-door neighbor. Keister's younger brother Tyler died in 2012 at age 24.

During the baseball off-season, Keister lives in Delaware.
