= Destin Hood =

American baseball player (born 1990)

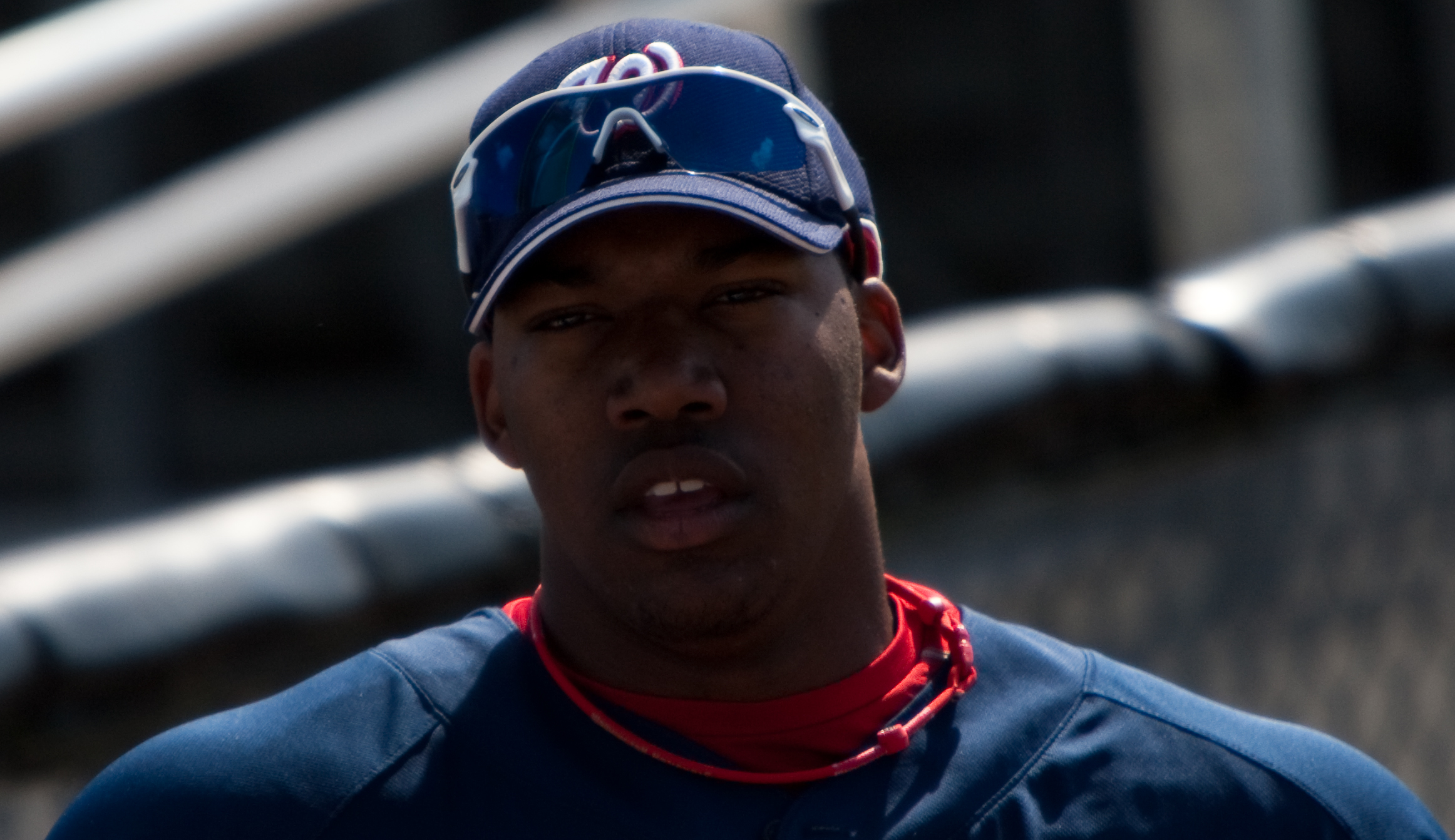
- Hood with the Washington Nationals during spring training in 2009
- Outfielder
- Born: April 3, 1990 (age 36); Mobile, Alabama, U.S.
- Batted: Right Threw: Right

MLB debut
- September 2, 2016, for the Miami Marlins

Last MLB appearance
- October 2, 2016, for the Miami Marlins

MLB statistics
- Batting average: .240
- Home runs: 1
- Runs batted in: 2
- Stats at Baseball Reference

Teams
- Miami Marlins (2016)

Destin Dwane Hood (born April 3, 1990) is an American former professional baseball outfielder. He played in Major League Baseball (MLB) for the Miami Marlins. He currently serves as a development coach for the Florida Complex League Nationals.

== Playing career ==
Hood attended St. Paul's Episcopal School in Mobile, Alabama, where he played on the baseball and football team. In football, he was ranked by Rivals.com as a four-star recruit and was committed to the University of Alabama to play college football for the Crimson Tide.

=== Washington Nationals ===
Hood was drafted by the Washington Nationals in the second round of the 2008 Major League Baseball draft. He signed with the Nationals, forgoing football at Alabama. He made his professional debut that season for the Gulf Coast Nationals. Hood spent 2009 with Gulf Coast and the Vermont Lake Monsters. He spent 2010 with the Hagerstown Suns and 2011 with the Potomac Nationals. In 2012, he played for the Auburn Doubledays and Harrisburg Senators. In 2013, he returned to Harrisburg. After returning to Harrisburg for a third straight year in 2014, he was promoted to the Syracuse Chiefs early in the season.

=== Cleveland Indians ===
On December 2, 2014, Hood signed a minor league contract with the Cleveland Indians organization. In 40 games for the Double–A Akron RubberDucks, he hit .293 with three home runs and 19 RBI; in 17 games for the Triple–A Columbus Clippers, he batted .170 with two RBI. Hood was released by the Indians on July 15, 2015.

=== Philadelphia Phillies ===
On July 17, 2015, signed a minor league contract with the Philadelphia Phillies. In 42 games for the Double-A Reading Fightin Phils, he batted .287/.314/.503 with seven home runs and 37 RBI. Hood elected free agency following the season on November 7.

=== Miami Marlins ===
Hood signed with the Miami Marlins organization for the 2016 season. The Marlins promoted Hood to the major leagues on September 1, 2016. He recorded his first career hit with a 5th inning double off of Indians pitcher Carlos Carrasco.

Hood spent the entirety of the 2017 season on optional assignment with the Triple–A New Orleans Baby Cakes, playing in 62 games and hitting .260/.349/.498 with 14 home runs and 41 RBI. He was removed from the 40–man roster and sent outright to Triple–A on October 7, 2017. Hood elected free agency following the season on November 6.

=== Texas Rangers ===
Hood signed a minor league contract with the Texas Rangers on January 4, 2018, with an invite to spring training. He played in 112 games split between the Triple-A Round Rock Express and Double-A Frisco RoughRiders, hitting .222/.274/.392 with 15 home runs and 56 RBI. Hood elected free agency following the season on November 2.

=== Lancaster Barnstormers ===
On February 13, 2019, Hood signed with the Lancaster Barnstormers of the independent Atlantic League of Professional Baseball. He became a free agent following the season. Hood re-signed with the Barnstormers on March 2, 2020. Hood did not play in a game for Lancaster in 2020 due to the cancellation of the Atlantic League season because of the COVID-19 pandemic. He became a free agent after the year.

=== Washington Nationals (second stint) ===
On May 12, 2021, Hood signed a minor league contract with the Washington Nationals organization. He did not make an appearance for the organization and elected free agency following the season on November 7.

== Coaching career ==
On January 18, 2022, it was announced that Hood had been hired by the Washington Nationals organization to serve as a development coach for the Florida Complex League Nationals, their rookie-level affiliate.
