= Cody Wilson (baseball) =

American baseball player (born 1996)

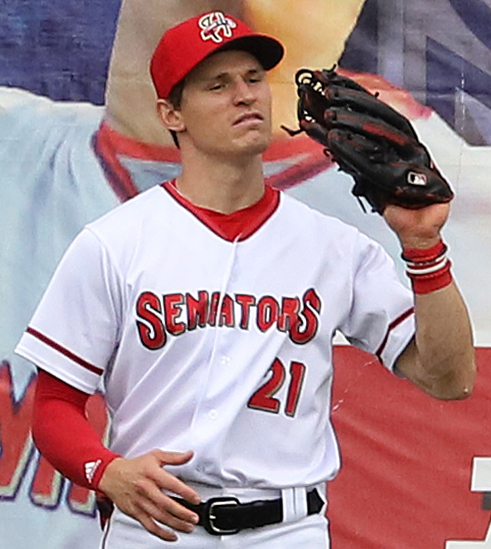
- Wilson with the Harrisburg Senators in 2021
- Outfielder
- Born: July 4, 1996 (age 30); West Palm Beach, Florida, U.S.
- Batted: Right Threw: Right

MLB debut
- April 7, 2021, for the Washington Nationals

Last MLB appearance
- April 7, 2021, for the Washington Nationals

MLB statistics
- Batting average: .000
- Home runs: 0
- Runs batted in: 0
- Stats at Baseball Reference

Teams
- Washington Nationals (2021)

Cody Roger George Wilson (born July 4, 1996) is an American former professional baseball outfielder. He played one game in Major League Baseball (MLB) for the Washington Nationals in 2021.

Wilson played junior college baseball for the Palm Beach State College Panthers from 2016 to 2017. In 2018, Wilson went on to Florida Atlantic University and played college baseball for the Florida Atlantic Owls. The Washington Nationals selected Wilson in the 13th round of the 2018 Major League Baseball draft.

== Amateur career ==
A resident of Jupiter, Florida, Wilson attended Jupiter Community High School, where he was a standout athlete who played baseball, basketball, and football. During his baseball career at Jupiter Community High School playing under coach Andy Mook, Wilson was named First Team All-Conference and Florida Region All-American Honorable Mention in 2015. Wilson finished at Jupiter Community High School with a .380 batting average, moving on to attend Palm Beach State College.

He played junior college baseball for the Palm Beach State College Panthers under coach Kyle Forbes from 2016 to 2017. Wilson ended his freshman campaign with a .323 batting average, earning himself MVP of the 2016 Palm Beach State. He appeared in just eight games as a sophomore after incurring a clavicle injury, where he was hitting .320 with a home run and seven RBI. Wilson held team bests of five home runs, 34 RBI, 34 runs scored, a .479 slugging percentage, 9 doubles, 3 triples, and was 11-of-12 stolen bases.

In 2018, Wilson went on to Florida Atlantic University and played college baseball for the Florida Atlantic Owls. Wilson led FAU with 14 home runs, and on the strength of a phenomenal postseason, raised his average to a season-high .285 following the finale with his only season with the team. Wilson had 71 hits, 12 doubles, 2 triples, 41 RBI, 49 runs scored, and was Florida Atlantic University's top base-stealer with 19-of-21 stolen bases. In the NCAA Regional, Wilson earned himself an All-Tournament nod batting a team-best of .500 with a double, a triple, and 2 home-runs with an inside-the-park run due to his speed. He also had four stolen bases and scored 5 runs with 6 runs batted in. His on-base-percentage in Gainesville was .577 and he slugged .909. Against Conference USA opponents, Wilson batted .300 with 9 of his 12 regular season homeruns and 20 RBI. Against Western Kentucky University, Wilson scored 4 runs to match the team's highest, earning FAU a win. From March 25-April 28, Wilson tied for the team's second longest hitting steak of the year.

== Professional career ==
=== Washington Nationals ===
The Washington Nationals drafted Wilson in the 13th round, with the 401st selection, of the 2018 Major League Baseball draft. He made his professional debut with the Low-A Auburn Doubledays.

Wilson split the 2019 campaign between the rookie-level Gulf Coast League Nationals, Auburn, and the Single-A Hagerstown Suns. In 86 appearances for the three affiliates, he batted a combined .222/.317/.330 with five home runs, 28 RBI, and 23 stolen bases. Wilson did not play in a game in 2020 due to the cancellation of the minor league season because of the COVID-19 pandemic.

In 2021, Wilson was invited to participate in his first spring training as a member of major league camp. Wilson was one of the minor league players brought to Nationals Park for a full-team workout the day before the Nationals' scheduled season opener, after a COVID-19 outbreak in the clubhouse led to the first four games of the season being postponed for the Nationals and landed nearly a dozen Washington players in quarantine. On April 6, 2021, Wilson was selected to the 40-man roster and promoted to the major leagues for the first time. He made his major league debut the next day, pinch-hitting for pitcher Kyle McGowin against Josh Tomlin and flying out to center. On April 9, Wilson was removed from the 40-man roster. He split the remainder of the year between the High-A Wilmington Blue Rocks, Double-A Harrisburg Senators, and Triple-A Rochester Red Wings, hitting a combined .124/.225/.164 with nine RBI and 10 stolen bases across 57 total appearances.

Wilson split the 2022 season between Wilmington and the rookie-level Florida Complex League Nationals, slashing .258/.321/.371 with two home runs, 12 RBI, and 18 stolen bases over 38 appearances for the two affiliates. In 2023, he made 83 appearances split between Wilmington and Rochester, batting .179/.265/.242 with two home runs, 14 RBI, and 19 stolen bases.

Wilson spent the entirety of the 2024 campaign with Double-A Harrisburg, playing in 88 games and batting .190/.284/.266 with two home runs, 19 RBI, and 13 stolen bases. He elected free agency following the season on November 4, 2024.

=== High Point Rockers ===
On April 17, 2025, Wilson signed with the High Point Rockers of the Atlantic League of Professional Baseball. Wilson made 34 appearances for the Rockers, batting .222/.326/.291 with two home runs, 14 RBI, and 12 stolen bases.

== Personal life ==
Wilson was born in West Palm Beach, Florida, on July 4, 1996. His hometown is Jupiter, Florida. He is son to Eric Wilson and Johanna Wilson. He met his wife, Taylor Selman, in 7th grade. Wilson and Selman married in December 2021 at The Pelican Club in Jupiter, Florida, featured on the cover of the Winter 2023 Inside Weddings Magazine.
