= National Slave Memorial =

National Slave Memorial (proposed)
- Location within the United States
- Location: Washington, D.C., U.S.
- Coordinates: 38.905°N 77.016°W (coordinates of Washington, D.C.)
- Established: Proposed

The National Slave Memorial is a proposed memorial to honor the victims of slavery in the United States. It was introduced during a 2003 Congressional session. Professor Ira Berlin noted that the proposed memorial is an example of the interest Americans in the early 21st century still have in the facts and legacy of slavery. The legislation has not been adopted; instead, Congress supported the creation of the National Museum of African American History and Culture, which opened on the National Mall in 2016.
