= Diamond Nation =

Baseball complex in New Jersey, US

- Location in New Jersey
- Address: 129 River Road, Flemington, New Jersey
- Coordinates: 40°32′8″N 74°50′48″W
- Type: Baseball complex
- Event: Sporting events
- Surface: Artificial turf
- Scoreboard: Yes

Tenant
- New Jersey Diamond Jacks (2000–present)

Website
- diamondnation.com

Diamond Nation is a 65-acre baseball complex in Raritan Township, New Jersey, that was established in 2009. It is home to Jack Cust Baseball Academy and Jennie Finch Softball Academy making itself a premier baseball and softball tournament and training center in the country. Diamond Nation currently has seven fields in total. Five of them are with ninety foot base paths, which can be converted into two little league fields each. The other two are seventy foot base paths.

The New Jersey Diamond Jacks, which is run by Jack Cust Baseball Academy, was established as an elite 18U organization. The association has expanded to include teams from the 10U age to 18U.

Multiple New Jersey high school baseball teams play games at Diamond Nation throughout the spring season.

On 20 July 2012, Diamond Nation released Club Diamond Nation, which is a virtual baseball and softball training academy.

In early 2014, Diamond Nation made proposals to build another complex in Fredericksburg, Virginia that would be home to Minor League Baseball team, Hagerstown Suns.

== Facility ==
Located at Diamond Nation are the HealthQuest Fitness Club and the HealthQuest Sports Dome. The fitness club was founded in 2001. The 140,000-square-foot sports dome was built in 2003 and was the largest air structure in the United States until it collapsed during a snow storm in winter 2015. The field it was built over is still there, known as the Jack Cust Baseball Academy.
