= Luis Mercedes =

Dominican baseball player (1968–2019)

- Outfielder
- Born: February 15, 1968; San Pedro de Macoris, Dominican Republic
- Died: June 30, 2019 (aged 51); San Pedro de Macoris, Dominican Republic
- Batted: Right Threw: Right

MLB debut
- September 8, 1991, for the Baltimore Orioles

Last MLB appearance
- September 23, 1993, for the San Francisco Giants

MLB statistics
- Batting average: .190
- Home runs: 0
- Runs batted in: 9
- Stats at Baseball Reference

Teams
- Baltimore Orioles (1991–1993); San Francisco Giants (1993)

Luis Roberto Mercedes Santana (February 15, 1968 – June 30, 2019) was a Dominican Major League Baseball (MLB) outfielder who played for the Baltimore Orioles and San Francisco Giants from 1991 to 1993.

== Career ==
He began his professional career in 1988 with the Bluefield Orioles.

After his time in the major leagues, Mercedes played with the Leones de Yucatan and Olmecas de Tabasco of the Mexican League and the Calgary Cannons of the Pacific Coast League in 1995 and 1996. He died on June 30, 2019, in San Pedro de Macoris, Dominican Republic due to complications from diabetes.
