= Matt Skole =

American baseball player (born 1989)

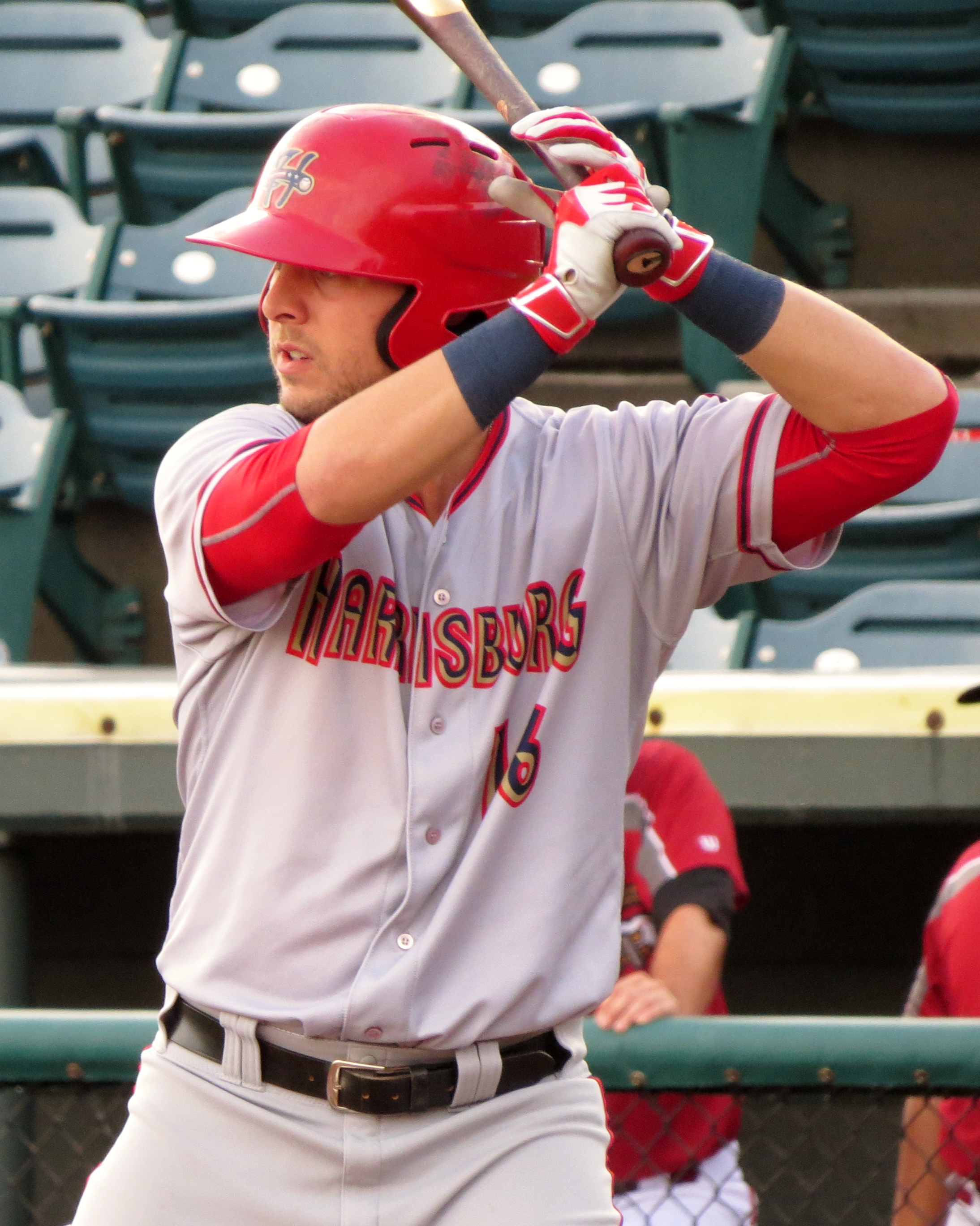
- Skole with the Harrisburg Senators
- First baseman
- Born: July 30, 1989 (age 36); Woodstock, Georgia, U.S.
- Batted: Left Threw: Right

MLB debut
- May 28, 2018, for the Chicago White Sox

Last appearance
- September 25, 2019, for the Chicago White Sox

MLB statistics
- Batting average: .217
- Home runs: 1
- Runs batted in: 7
- Stats at Baseball Reference

Teams
- Chicago White Sox (2018–2019)

Matthew Thomas Skole (born July 30, 1989) is an American former professional baseball first baseman who played in Major League Baseball (MLB) for the Chicago White Sox in 2018 and 2019.

== Baseball career ==
=== Amateur ===
Skole attended Georgia Tech, and in 2009 and 2010 he played collegiate summer baseball with the Falmouth Commodores of the Cape Cod Baseball League. He was selected by the Washington Nationals in the fifth round of the 2011 Major League Baseball draft.

=== Washington Nationals ===
In 2012, Skole was the South Atlantic League MVP and Nationals Minor League Player of the Year after hitting .291/.426/.559 with 27 home runs and 104 runs batted in.

Prior to the 2013 season, Skole was ranked as the Nationals fourth-best prospect by Baseball America. However, Skole collided with a runner on a fielding play at first base in the second game of his 2013 campaign with the Double–A Harrisburg Senators, falling to the ground and tearing his ulnar collateral ligament and flexor tendon in his left elbow. He underwent Tommy John surgery on April 17, 2013, taking him out of action for the season. Skole returned to action and played in the Nationals' instructional league in September and then against high minor league talent for the Mesa Solar Sox in the Arizona Fall League.

Skole struggled somewhat in 2014 after missing a significant amount of the previous season, batting .241/.352/.399 with Harrisburg. He slipped down the prospect rankings, with Baseball America listing him as the Nationals' 24th-best prospect after the season—20 places lower than he was before it started. He was not added to the 40-man roster ahead of the Rule 5 draft that winter, but no team selected him and he remained with the Nationals organization.

Despite Skole's poor 2014 campaign, he was invited to spring training with the major league ballclub in 2015. After hitting well in spring training, he got off to a slow start with Harrisburg but then went on an offensive tear in June and July, earning a promotion to the Triple–A Syracuse Chiefs. Skole was once again left unprotected before the Rule 5 draft after the season, but again, he was not drafted and remained part of the organization.

The Nationals again invited Skole to spring training before their 2016 season. He spent the entire season with Syracuse for the first time in his minor league career. The Nationals added Skole to their 40-man roster after the 2016 season, in which he hit 24 home runs as a Chief and won a minor league Gold Glove Award at first base.

While on the minor league disabled list, Skole was designated from assignment and removed from the Nationals' 40-man roster on July 29, 2017, to clear space for newly acquired utilityman Howie Kendrick. He cleared waivers and was released by the Nationals, but days later, he signed a new minor league contract with the organization and was assigned to the Auburn Doubledays. Skole elected free agency following the season on November 6.

=== Chicago White Sox ===
On November 21, 2017, Skole announced that he had signed with the Chicago White Sox. Skole was called up to the majors on May 28, 2018, and he made his debut that day. On the first pitch of his first at-bat, Skole singled off Cleveland Indians starter Adam Plutko. Skole hit his first big league home run in his next at-bat, also against Plutko. Skole was outrighted off the roster on September 4, and later elected free agency following the season on November 2.

On November 19, 2018, Skole re-signed with Chicago on a minor league deal. He was assigned to the Triple–A Charlotte Knights to start the 2019 season. On August 2, 2019, the White Sox selected Skole's contract. On October 28, Skole was outrighted off of the White Sox roster and elected free agency.

On January 21, 2020, Skole once more re-signed with the White Sox on a minor league contract. He did not play in a game in 2020 due to the cancellation of the minor league season because of the COVID-19 pandemic. Skole was released by the White Sox organization on June 26.

== Playing style ==
In his minor league seasons, Skole has exclusively played at first and third base in the field. Nationals General Manager Mike Rizzo described him in 2012 as someone who "probably profiles as a left-handed power bat at first base". He has also been noted as a patient hitter with a "strong propensity to take walks".

== Personal life ==
His brother, Jake, is also a professional baseball player, currently playing for the Savannah Party Animals in the Banana Ball Championship League.
