= Ken Gerhart =

American baseball player (born 1961)

- Outfielder
- Born: May 19, 1961 (age 64); Charleston, South Carolina, U.S.
- Batted: Right Threw: Right

MLB debut
- September 14, 1986, for the Baltimore Orioles

Last MLB appearance
- October 2, 1988, for the Baltimore Orioles

MLB statistics
- Batting average: .221
- Home runs: 24
- Runs batted in: 64
- Stats at Baseball Reference

Teams
- Baltimore Orioles (1986–1988)

Harold Kenneth Gerhart (born May 19, 1961), is a retired Major League Baseball player who was an outfielder from 1986 to 1988 for the Baltimore Orioles. He was nicknamed "Gomer" because of his resemblance to Gomer Pyle. His career came to an abrupt ending when he was struck in the wrist while batting. He now lives with his family in Murfreesboro, Tennessee.

== Career ==
Gerhart graduated from MTSU and was drafted by the Baltimore Orioles in 1982 during the 5th round of the amateur draft. Being drafted in 1982, he spent four years in the minors, and debuted against the Detroit Tigers in 1986. After two years of playing, he got injured while batting when he was hit by a pitch in the wrist. The injury ended his major league career.

He holds the single season runs scored record for the Hagerstown Suns minor league baseball team with 131 runs scored in 1983. He is also the Suns career leader in runs scored with 170 (tied with Don Buford).
