= Luis Lopez (third baseman) =

American baseball player (born 1973)

- First baseman/Third baseman
- Born: October 5, 1973 (age 52); Brooklyn, New York
- Batted: Right Threw: Right

MLB debut
- April 29, 2001, for the Toronto Blue Jays

Last MLB appearance
- April 24, 2004, for the Montreal Expos

MLB statistics
- Batting average: .226
- Home runs: 3
- Runs batted in: 10
- Stats at Baseball Reference

Teams
- Toronto Blue Jays (2001); Montreal Expos (2004); Tohoku Rakuten Golden Eagles (2005)

Luis Lopez (born October 5, 1973) is a former Major League Baseball third baseman and first baseman. He played parts of two seasons in the major leagues: 2001 for the Toronto Blue Jays and 2004 for the Montreal Expos. In 2005, he played in Nippon Professional Baseball for the Tohoku Rakuten Golden Eagles. He last played for the Bridgeport Bluefish of the Atlantic League in 2013.

== Career ==
Lopez began his professional career in 1995 with the independent St. Paul Saints, then playing in the Northern League. He was signed by the Blue Jays the following year. Since 2005, Lopez has played in various independent leagues as well as in the Mexican League.

He now coaches baseball as head coach of the New York Nighthawks 18u team and is an assistant coach at Monroe College.
