= Leo Gómez =

Puerto Rican baseball player (born 1966)

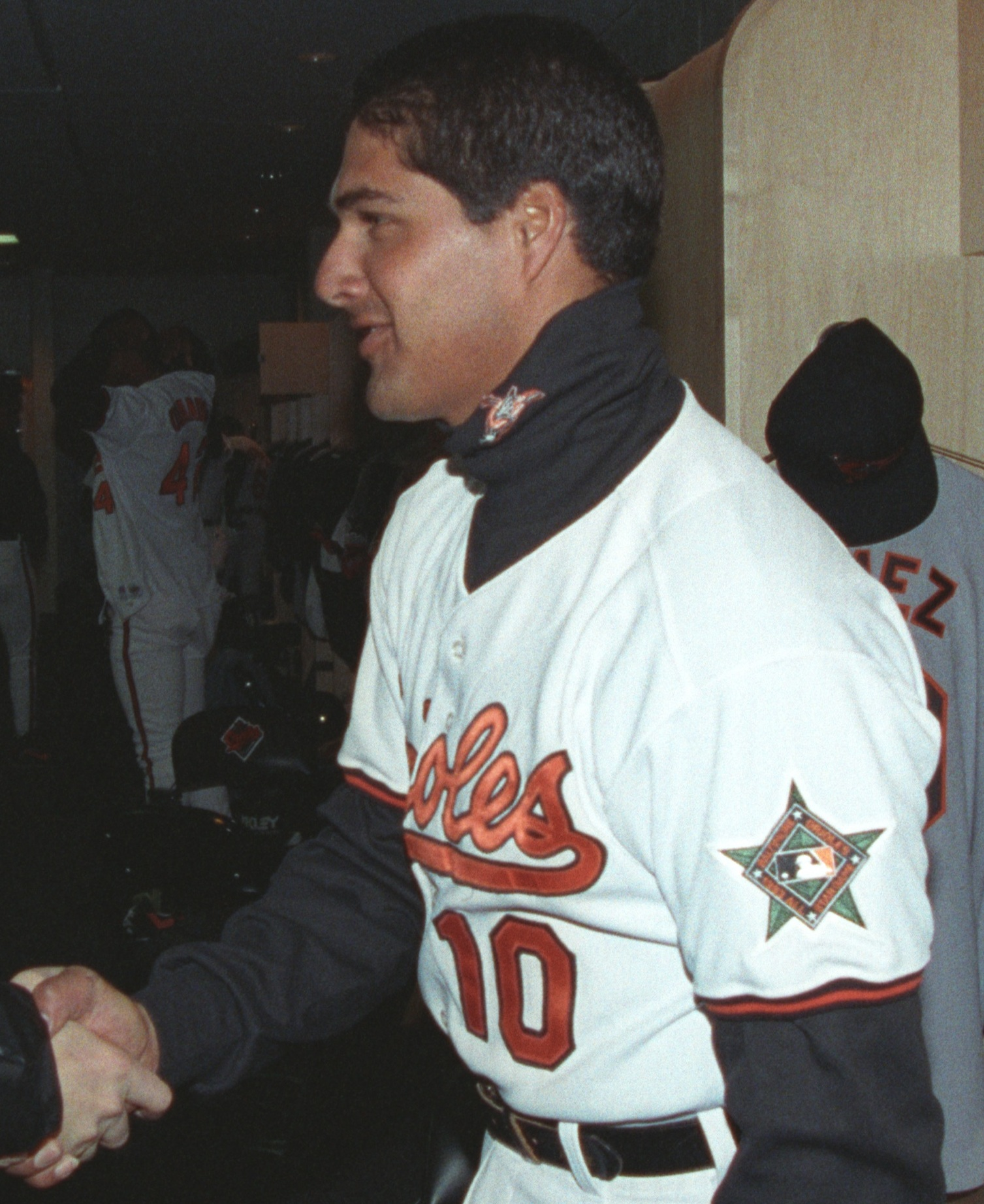
- Gómez with the Baltimore Orioles in 1993
- Third baseman
- Born: March 2, 1966 (age 59); Canóvanas, Puerto Rico
- Batted: Right Threw: Right

Professional debut
- MLB: September 17, 1990, for the Baltimore Orioles
- NPB: April 4, 1997, for the Chunichi Dragons

Last appearance
- MLB: September 29, 1996, for the Chicago Cubs
- NPB: July 3, 2002, for the Chunichi Dragons

MLB statistics
- Batting average: .243
- Home runs: 79
- Runs batted in: 259

NPB statistics
- Batting average: .293
- Home runs: 153
- Runs batted in: 449
- Stats at Baseball Reference

Teams
- Baltimore Orioles (1990–1995); Chicago Cubs (1996); Chunichi Dragons (1997–2002)

Leonardo Gómez Vélez (born March 2, 1966) is a Puerto Rican former professional baseball player who played in Major League Baseball primarily as a third baseman in 1990 to 1996. He also played in Nippon Professional Baseball from 1997 to 2002.

== Career ==
=== Minor leagues ===
Gómez was signed by the Baltimore Orioles in 1985 as an amateur free agent. He broke into professional baseball with the 1986 Bluefield Orioles, batting .352/~.496/.693 in just 27 games. His average would have led the Appalachian League had he played enough to qualify and despite missing over half the season, he still was only one home run behind the Bluefield leader. Even though Appy league managers got just a glance at Gómez, they rated him the #10 prospect in the circuit, tied with Gerónimo Peña.

Leo moved up to the Carolina League in 1987. For the Hagerstown Suns, Gómez won the batting title with a line of .326/.440/.538 with 94 runs, 38 doubles, 19 homers, 110 RBI and 95 walks. He led the league in slugging percentage and doubles and tied Casey Webster for the RBI lead. Milt Harper edged him by five points for the OBP lead. In the Year of the Third Baseman in the Carolina League (according to Baseball America), Gómez beat out Webster, Jeff King and Hensley Meulens for the All-Star spot at the hot corner, though Webster (who made the team at DH) won MVP honors and Meulens (who made the All-Stars as a utility man) was named top prospect. Gómez was picked as the second-best hope for the future.

At age 22, Gómez moved up to the AA Charlotte Knights but only played 24 games (presumably he was injured most of the season) and hit .292/.364/.382 with only one homer in 89 at-bats. His progress stunted, he returned to AA in 1989, returning to Hagerstown, which had moved up the ladder. The Puerto Rican infielder hit .281/.400/.467 with 18 homers and a league-high 89 walks. His 78 RBI ranked second, he was fifth in homers and presumably in the top five in slugging and OBP as well. He made the Eastern League All-Star team at third base, his second minor league All-Star team in his only two full seasons of play.

Gómez spent most of the 1990 campaign with the Rochester Red Wings. Leo hit .277/~.408/.537 with 26 homers, 97 runs, 89 walks and 97 RBI. He led the International League in runs and RBI, was one walk behind the league leader (Jim Walewander) and tied for second in HR, seven behind leader Phil Plantier. He again was among the OBP and slugging leaders. He was named to the All-Star team once again at third base for the third time in his three full seasons. In the Triple-A All-Star Game, Gómez hit 5th for the AL team, right behind Juan González. In his three full years in the minors, he had led his leagues in batting average, slugging percentage, walks, runs, RBI and doubles and had been second in OBP and homers.

=== In the majors ===
That earned him a September call-up to the majors in 1990, where he batted .231/.362/.231 with no homers and one RBI. In 1991, Gómez became the Orioles' everyday third baseman though he spent June back in Rochester (.257/.359/.495), batting .233/.302/.409 for the O's with 16 HR's and 45 RBI in 118 games. He had a very good year in 1992 when he batted .265/.356/.425 (116 OPS+) with 17 HR's and 64 RBI. In 1993, he fell to .197/.295/.348 (71 OPS+) with 10 HR's and 25 RBI. During the strike year of 1994, Gómez was having an excellent year, batting .274/.336/.502 (a 117 OPS+) with 15 HR's and 56 RBI. In Gómez's final year in Baltimore, 1995, he fell to .236/.336/.370 with only 4 HR's and 12 RBI.

As a result of Gómez's poor performance with Baltimore, he was let go at the end of the 1995 season. He signed as a free agent with the Chicago Cubs in January 1996. Gómez rebounded to a .238/.344/.431 season (a 103 OPS+), with 17 HR's and 56 RBI. However, he was released in December.

=== Japan ===
Gómez signed with the Chunichi Dragons in 1997. In his first season, he hit .315/.407/.559 with 21 home runs and 89 RBI, which earned him his first of two Best Nines. Gómez's success continued in the 1998 season, when he batted .274/.363/.493 with 26 home runs and 76 RBI.

In 1999, Gómez had his career best year in Japan, batting .297/.389/.570 with 36 home runs and 109 RBI, which earned him to another Best Nine squad. He was third in the Central League in RBI that season. He slid to .289/.373/.507 with 25 home runs and 79 RBI in 2000.

Gómez was signed to a minor league contract by the Pittsburgh Pirates in 2001, but didn't play very much that spring, and was let go by the Pirates. As a result, he re-signed with the Dragons, where he batted .306/.398/.546 with 19 home runs and 61 RBI. During his final year with Chunichi in 2002, he batted .267/.344/.502 with 16 circuit clouts and 43 RBI. In his last two years in the NPB, Gómez was plagued by knee injuries. Overall Leo hit .293/.382/.532 in Japan, with 153 home runs. For years he was probably the Dragons' top power threat, leading the club three times and finishing second to Takeshi Yamasaki twice (once trailing by a single homer). Only in his last year did he not finish in the club's top two and his rate of one every 15.4 AB still led Chunichi's regulars.

Leo Gómez hit over 300 homers as a pro baseball player.

=== Minor League manager ===
He managed the Aberdeen IronBirds of the New York–Penn League in 2011.

Preceded by Robin Ventura	Topps Rookie All-Star Third Baseman; 1991	Succeeded by Scott Livingstone
