= Hagerstown Suns =

- 1981–2020; Hagerstown, Maryland
Team logo
Cap insignia

Minor league affiliations
- Class: Class A (1993–2020)
- Previous classes: Double-A (1989–1992); Class A (1981–1988)
- League: South Atlantic League (1993–2020)
- Previous leagues: Eastern League (1989–1992); Carolina League (1981–1988)

Major league affiliations
- Team: Washington Nationals (2007–2020)
- Previous teams: New York Mets (2005–2006); San Francisco Giants (2001–2004); Toronto Blue Jays (1993–2000); Baltimore Orioles (1982–1992); Co-op (1981)

Minor league titles
- League titles (1): 1981
- Division titles (7): 1981; 1986; 1994; 1998; 2005; 2013; 2014

Team data
- Name: Hagerstown Suns (1993–2020)
- Previous names: Myrtle Beach Hurricanes (1991-1992); Myrtle Beach Blue Jays (1987-1990) Florence Blue Jays (1981-1986)
- Colors: Blue, red, silver, white
- Mascot: Woolie B. (2001–2020); Jay-Jay (1993–2000); Sunny (1987–1992)
- Ballpark: Municipal Stadium (1993–2020); American Legion Stadium (1981–1986)
- Owner(s)/ Operator(s): Hagerstown Baseball, LLC
- General manager: Travis Painter

The Hagerstown Suns were a Minor League Baseball team based in Hagerstown, Maryland. They were a member of the South Atlantic League and, from 2007 through 2020, were the Class A affiliate of the Washington Nationals. They played their home games at Municipal Stadium which was opened in 1930 and seated 4,600 people. The team mascot was Woolie, a giant woolly bear caterpillar.

== History ==
=== Toronto Blue Jays (1993–2000) ===
The ownership of the previous Double A Hagerstown Suns chose to move their existing Hagerstown franchise to Bowie as the Bowie Baysox. Hagerstown would not go without, though. Winston Blenckstone immediately relocated his Myrtle Beach Hurricanes franchise in the Class A South Atlantic League (SAL) to Hagerstown after the 1992 season and promptly renamed them the Suns.

The change brought a competitive team to Hagerstown for the 1993 season. The offense got steady power production from Mike Coolbaugh, who led the team with 16 home runs. The best all-around hitter on the team proved to be D.J. Boston. Boston hit .315 with 13 home runs and 93 runs batted in (RBI). Those numbers were good enough to earn him league Most Valuable Player (MVP) honors. Two outfielders, Rickey Cradle and Jose Herrera, put together solid seasons at the plate for the Suns. Herrera hit .317 in 95 games, while Cradle belted 13 home runs. Brad Cornett led the team in earned run average (ERA), with a 2.40 mark, and also innings pitched, with 172.1. Silva went 12–4 with a 2.52 ERA in 142.2 innings. In that time frame, Silva struck out 161 batters.

In 1994, the Suns reached the playoffs for the first time since 1991. On offense, the team was led by former first round draft choice Shannon Stewart. Stewart hit .324 with 4 home runs and 25 RBI in an injury-shortened season. Tom Evans returned from the 1993 squad, hitting .273 with 13 home runs and 48 RBI in 95 games. The power was supplied by Lorenzo Delacruz and Ryan Jones, who hit 19 and 18 home runs, respectively. Jones also had a team leading 72 RBI. Edwin Hurtado went 11–2 with a 2.95 ERA in 33 games, 16 of which were starts. The bullpen was headlined by Steve Sinclair and Dave Sinnes. Sinclair appeared in 37 games out of the bullpen and picked up a total of 9 wins with 105 innings pitched. Sinclair only made one start for the Suns all year. Closer Sinnes tied for the South Atlantic League lead with 37 saves.

In 1995, veteran Jeff Ladd was the home run leader on the team. Ladd hit 19 home runs in 95 games before a promotion to Double-A Knoxville. That turned out to be Ladd's last professional season. Bobby Llanos hit 17 home runs and produced a team leading 63 RBI. The Suns got stable production behind the plate from Julio Mosquera. Mosquera hit .291 in 108 games for the team. Brian Smith pitched his way to a 9–1 record in 47 games out of the bullpen and picked up 21 saves along the way. He also had 101 strikeouts in 104 innings. Doug Meiners proved to be the Suns' best starter of the season. He went 8–4 with a 2.99 ERA in 18 starts. Another highlight from the starting staff was Tom Davey, who went 4–1 with a 3.38 ERA in 8 starts.

The 1996 campaign was the Suns' first losing year in the SAL. First basemen Mike Whitlock led the team in home runs (20) and RBI (91) with a .252 batting average while drawing a franchise record 108 walks. He did this in 131 games at the age of 19, yet never played a game in the major leagues. Another player who displayed power was Craig Wilson. Wilson hit 11 home runs with 70 RBI while maintaining a .261 batting average. Craig Stone returned from the 1995 squad, batting .310 with 10 home runs and 35 RBI in 56 games. Mike Johnson won a staff-leading 11 games and also had a team-leading total of 162.2 innings pitched. He made his major league debut a season later with the Baltimore Orioles. Tom Davey won 10 games and had a 3.87 ERA in 26 starts.

In 1997, the offense was led by Luis Lopez, who put together one of the best individual years by a Sun ever. Lopez batted .358 with 11 home runs and 99 RBI. These numbers would give him SAL MVP honors. The pitching staff was led by Clint Lawrence, who won a team-leading 13 games in 26 starts. One pitcher who had a bizarre season was starter Gary Glover. Glover posted a 3.73 ERA and threw a team leading 173.2 innings. He, along with John Bale, tied for the team lead in strikeouts with 155. Despite these advantages, his overall record was 6–17. Those 17 losses set a franchise record. The Suns finished in last place, 11 games behind first place Charleston (West Virginia).

The 1998 offense got power from catcher/first basemen Bobby Cripps. Cripps hit 29 home runs and also led the Suns with 88 RBI and threw out 47 percent of would-be base stealers in 56 games behind the plate. Mike Young batted .282 with 16 home runs and 86 RBI at second base. Two other future major league All Stars on the Suns that year were Vernon Wells and César Izturis. Wells batted .285 with 11 home runs and 65 RBI. Izturis meanwhile had a .262 average with a team-leading 20 stolen bases. John Sneed had one of the best seasons ever by a Suns pitcher, as he won a franchise record 16 games, while losing just 2, with a 2.56 ERA in 27 starts. He also collected 200 strikeouts in 161.1 innings pitched. Clayton Andrews returned from the 1997 squad and nearly matched Sneed's dominance. He went 10–7 with a 2.28 ERA and had 193 strikeouts in 162 innings pitched. The Suns closer was Jaron Seabury, who had a 1.65 ERA in 45 games with 17 saves. The Suns won the first-half division title and finished with the best record in the Northern Division. They made the playoffs and won in the first round, but did not advance to the championship because the league now had a three-round playoff format featuring 8 out of 14 teams. In the second round, the Suns would lose to the eventual league champion Capital City Bombers.

In 1999, Jay Gibbons was the best all-around hitter. In 71 games, Gibbons batted .305 with 16 home runs and 69 RBI. Second basemen Jorge Nunez batted .268 with 14 home runs and 61 RBI, while leading the team with 51 stolen bases. Outfielder Ryan Fleming hit .335 in 61 games. Tyler Thompson led the team with 17 homeruns and RBI with 81. Pasqual Coco went 9–1 in 14 starts with a 2.21 ERA. Scott Cassidy won a team-leading 13 games in 27 starts in 170.2 innings. He struck out 178 batters, leading the team. The Suns bullpen got a strong season from closer Jarrod Kingrey. Kingrey had 27 saves and 69 strikeouts in 61 innings. he Suns made the playoffs by winning the first-half division title and wound up with the best overall record in the SAL. They were knocked out of the first round by their division rival, the Cape Fear Crocs. This was the last season that the SAL used a three division (North, Central, and South) format.

The Suns had a losing season in 2000. Reed Johnson hit .290 with 8 home runs and 70 RBI in 95 games. Kevin Cash led the team in home runs with 10, while also contributing 27 RBI in 59 games. He displayed great defense by throwing out 55 percent of potential base stealers. Shortstop Brandon Jackson led the team with a .312 batting average, while outfielder Shannon Carter stole a team-leading 33 bases. Marcos Sandoval led the Suns with 163.2 innings pitched, while Travis Hubbel posted a 3.89 ERA in 19 starts. Matt Ford, a 19-year-old left-hander, went 5–3 with a 3.87 ERA in 18 games, 14 of which were starts. He struck out 86 batters in 83 innings with the team. Rob Hamman picked up 8 wins while pitching in 34 games, but only one of them was a start. The most unusual aspect of the season was the bench–clearing brawl that occurred in July against the Columbus Red Stixx at Municipal Stadium. The Suns were losing when Reed Johnson was hit by a pitch that caused outfielder Auntwan Riggins to charge the pitcher from the dugout. The brawl led to so many ejections that Columbus was unable to field a full team and had to forfeit the game to the Suns. Officially, Hagerstown was declared the game's winner by a 9–1 score.

=== San Francisco Giants (2001–2004) ===
The 2001 season brought on a lot of changes for the Hagerstown Suns. After eight seasons with the Toronto Blue Jays, the team switched its parent club to the San Francisco Giants. The team was also sold to Andy Rayburn. On the field, the Suns returned to winning. The offense got power from Dan Trumble, who led the team with 26 home runs. Outfielder Jason Ellison put together a good season, as he batted .291 with a team leading 19 stolen bases in 130 games. Adam Shabala would post a solid .313 batting average in a span of 70 games. The pitching staff was the best that the Suns had since joining the South Atlantic League, as two pitchers won over 10 games. Boof Bonser tied the Suns' record for wins in a season with 16, while losing just 4 games. He also struck out 178 batters in 134 innings, earning him the South Atlantic League Pitcher of the Year Award. Another player with 10 plus wins was Jeff Clark. Clark would go 14–9 while posting a solid 3.65 Earned Run Average (ERA) in 27 games. The most impressive season for the Suns may have come out of the bullpen, as closer Jackson Markert put together a memorable year. Markert broke the Suns' save record by picking up 39 saves and posting a 2.82 ERA. His success was a big reason why the Suns advanced to the playoffs. After winning the Northern Division second-half title, the Suns entered the playoffs, but came up short as Lexington swept them in two games.

The Suns missed the playoffs in 2002, suffering a losing record. Tyler Von Schell led the Suns in home runs with 14. Julian Benavidez led the way in RBIs. Brandon Florence may have been the best all-around hitter on the team with an batting average of .303, with 11 home runs, and 63 RBI in 109 games. On the pitching side, Anthony Pannone led the Suns with nine wins and led innings pitched with 168.2. Ryan Hannaman put together a nice season with a 2.80 ERA and 145 strikeouts in 131.2 innings. Suns fans also saw a glimpse of what was to come with Francisco Liriano. Liriano went 3–6, but had a 3.59 ERA and struck out 85 batters in 80 innings as an 18-year-old. The Suns finished 20.5 games back of the first place, and eventual league champions Hickory Crawdads. Mandalay Entertainment Group purchased the team from Andy Rayburn.

The team scraped together a winning season in 2003 but did not make the playoffs. The Suns' best power hitter in 2003 was Carlos Sosa, who led the team in both homeruns and RBI with 10 and 63. Derin McMains hit a solid .289 in 54 games before he was promoted to High-A San Jose. Brian Buscher would come to the Suns in the second half and hit .275 in 54 games. The strength of the Suns in 2003 lied in their pitching staff, in which several pitchers had great seasons. Merkin Valdez went 9–5 with a 2.25 ERA in 26 starts. He also led the Suns in innings pitched with 156, and strikeouts with 166. Josh Habel led the team with 11 wins in 36 games, 16 of which were starts. Habel also accumulated 127 strikeouts in 122 innings. Brian Stirm was also solid, as he went 8–5 with a 2.86 ERA in 17 games. Other noteworthy starters for the Suns in 2003 were Clay Hensley and Matt Cain. Hensley went 4–3 with 3.18 ERA in 12 starts before he was promoted to High–A San Jose, but one start in particular was noteworthy. On May 3, 2003, Hensley threw the Suns' only perfect game. He did this by retiring 21 consecutive batters in the second game of a double header against the Kannapolis Intimidators. Meanwhile, Matt Cain went 4–4 in 14 starts with the Suns, while posting a 2.55 ERA. He struck out 90 batters in just 74 innings. In the bullpen, Matt Palmer would have a great season as he went 5–0 with a 1.20 ERA and 25 saves. The Suns pitching staff in 2003 stands out among the best in franchise history.

The 2004 season turned out to be one of the worst seasons for the Suns. They finished in last place in the South Atlantic League North Division, 34.5 games behind the eventual league champion Hickory Crawdads. In his short stay with the team, Nate Schierholtz proved to be the best hitter. He batted .289 with 15 homeruns and 54 RBI in just 59 games. Another productive hitter on the team that year was Travis Ishikawa. Ishikawa had exactly the same home run and RBI total as Schierholtz, with a .257 average in 97 games. Both players were promoted to High-A San Jose before the season's end. Designated hitter Jason Columbus led the team in RBI with 87. The Suns' leader in wins was Juan Serrato, who compiled 8 wins in 26 games, 21 of which were starts. The Suns' best all-around pitcher in 2004 was reliever Joe Bateman. Bateman went 7–5 with a 2.14 ERA in 36 games. He picked up 81 strikeouts in just 70 innings of work before he was promoted to Double-A Norwich. One pitcher of note in the Suns bullpen was Brian Wilson. Wilson's numbers in Hagerstown were not impressive, 2–5 with a 5.34 ERA in 23 games and 3 starts. However, Wilson's later major league performances earned him a spot in the Hagerstown Suns Hall of Fame.

=== New York Mets (2005–2006) ===
Hagerstown once again changed affiliates in 2005, initiating a two-year stint with the New York Mets. Minor League Baseball teams are known for their promotions, and the Suns had one consistent with the cold weather that Hagerstown has early in the baseball season. The Suns unveiled their "Eskimo Day" promotion including giving every fan a free ice cube and granting free admission to fans indigenous to Alaska, Canada, or any place where Eskimos are part of the culture. There was also a special contest for fans at the ballpark: guessing how long it would take a bucket of ice to melt. On the field, the season began with a seven-game winning streak. On May 8, Hagerstown and Asheville combined for 35 runs in the Suns' 19–16 victory. Hagerstown broke a 16–16 tie with three runs in the 12th inning. The clubs set a South Atlantic League record with 20 extra-base hits, while the 41 hits–23 for Hagerstown—matched a league mark. Also in May, Hagerstown committed seven errors in a game against Delmarva. In June, the Suns qualified for the playoffs in dramatic fashion. Pitcher Gaby Hernandez's 115–pitch no-hitter in a 1–0 win over the West Virginia Power on June 19 set up a one-game playoff between the Suns and Lexington Legends on June 25 for the first-half crown. Both teams completed the first–half regular schedule with 42–28 records. In the one game playoff, the Suns defeated the Legends, 9–4, with Hernandez again taking the mound and the win. The Suns slumped badly during the second half of the season, finishing last in the Northern Division. In September however, Hagerstown won the Northern Division by defeating the second-half Northern Division champion Delmarva Shorebirds two games to one. The Suns were ultimately unsuccessful in their quest for the South Atlantic League championship, losing to the Kannapolis Intimidators, three games to one.

The Suns' prowess in promotions was recognized in 2006 with the award of the "Veeckie" Award from ESPN The Magazine for their "They even gave away the Kitchen Sink" kitchen sink giveaway promotion. The award, named after famous baseball promoter Bill Veeck, is given annually by the magazine to recognize the industry's top promotions each season. The Suns have received a "Veeckie" in three of the previous five years. Earlier winning promotions included the Guinness World Record for the Youngest Broadcaster ever (2002) and the Free Funeral Giveaway (2003), which was also selected as the Promotion of the Year by ESPN the Magazine and was named as one of the top five baseball promotions of all time by Sports Illustrated. The most noteworthy event on the field was an 8–7 loss at Lakewood, a 22-inning marathon that took nearly a week and a half to complete. The game began on April 26, but was called in the 17th inning due to league rules that state an inning cannot be started after 12:30 a.m. It was finally completed on May 6, taking 7 hours and 47 minutes. The 22 innings bested the previous 21-inning South Atlantic League record.

=== Washington Nationals (2007–2020) ===
In 2007, the Suns became a member of the Washington Nationals farm system. The Suns won few games as the talent-poor Nationals organization rapidly promoted Suns players with potential. Of four players selected for the South Atlantic League All-Star Game (Leonard Davis, Cory VanAllen, Mike Daniel, and Chris Marrero), none actually played because they had been promoted to the Class A-Advanced Potomac Nationals by the time the game occurred. In the promotions area, romance novelist Nora Roberts was honored with a Nora Roberts bobblehead on July 6. Roberts is a resident of Washington County, Maryland, where Hagerstown is located and has been honored by the Suns several times.

There were two significant milestones for the Suns organization in 2008. The first occurred on May 30, when the number 50 was retired in honor of SAL President Emeritus John Henry Moss. Along with the number-retiring ceremony, the Suns honored Moss with a bronze plaque placed in Municipal Stadium, highlighting his 50 years of service to the league. The second milestone occurred on November 13 when Hagerstown native and Suns Director of Business Operations Carol Gehr was selected as the Rawlings Woman Executive of the Year. The Rawlings Award honors an outstanding woman executive from either Major League or Minor League Baseball. Gehr was with the club in many capacities over a 25-year career spanning six different ownership groups.

A bright spot to an otherwise dismal season in 2009 was the performance of catcher Derek Norris. He led the SAL with a .413 on-base percentage and 90 walks while being named the SAL's Most Outstanding Major League Prospect. He also finished among the top five in the SAL in homers (23), extra-base hits (53), RBIs (84), runs (78), and slugging percentage (.513). He was selected as the designated hitter to the Class A Topps/MiLB All-Star Team, which includes both A-Advanced and A level leagues.

On July 15, 2010, Hagerstown players Steven Souza and J.R. Higley were suspended for using performance-enhancing drugs. Each received 50-game suspensions after testing positive for methylphenidate and ritalinic acid, performance-enhancing substances in violation of the Minor League Drug Prevention and Treatment Program. Souza was a 2010 SAL All-Star. On the field, Eury Perez's four stolen bases in seven innings against Delmarva on August 19 was nominated as one of the Class A games of the year for 2010. Finally, a new ownership group with local ties, Hagerstown Baseball, LLC, purchased the Suns in September 2010 for a reported $6.7 million from Mandalay Sports Entertainment. Mandalay used proceeds of the sale to purchase the Oklahoma City Redhawks Triple-A franchise. The new ownership group is led by Florida businessman and general manager of Polo Trace Country Club Bruce Quinn; Tony Dahbura, corporate vice president of Hub Labels in Hagerstown; Dr. Mitesh Kothari of Hagerstown; and Quinn's sister, Sheri.

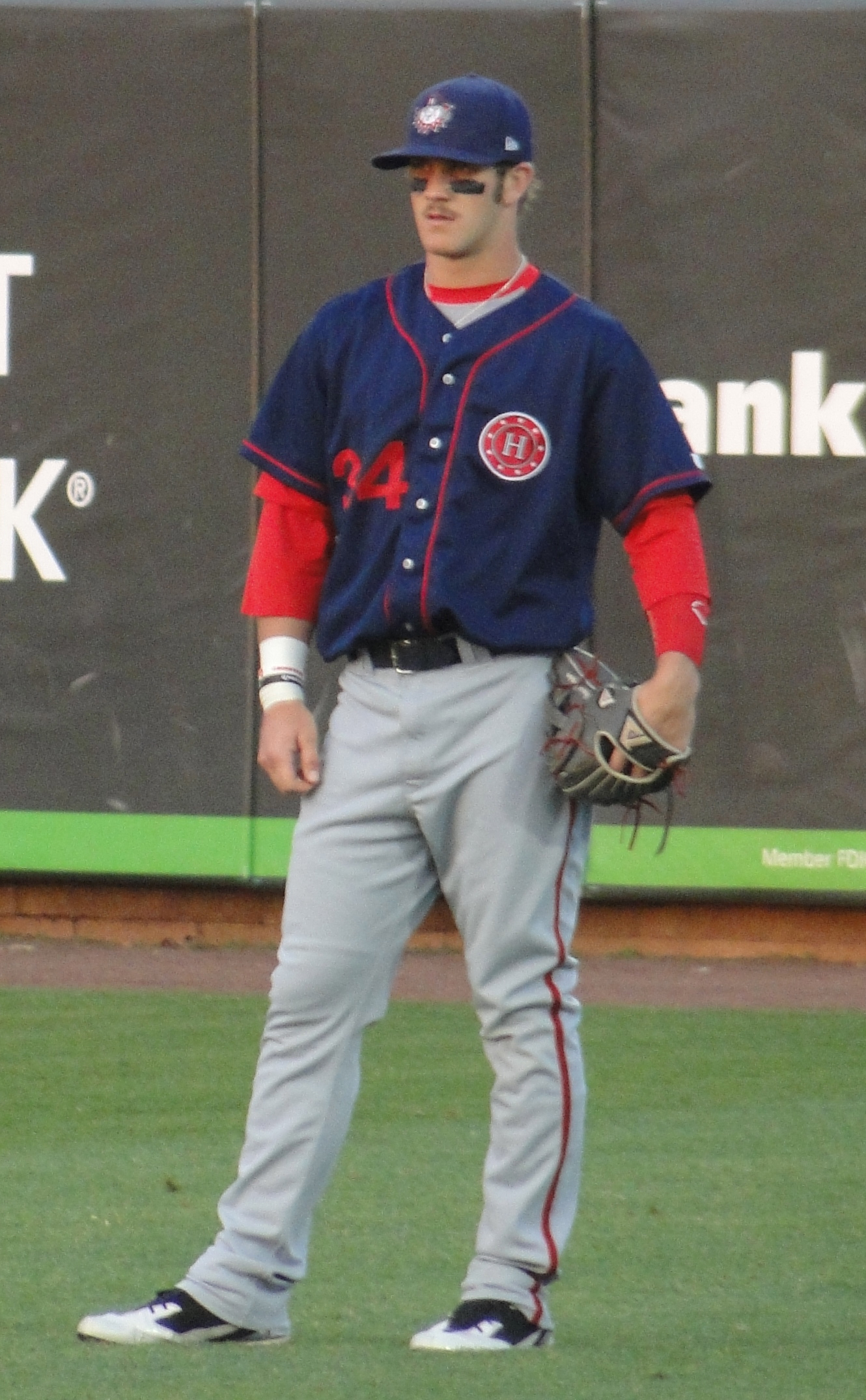
Bryce Harper playing for the Suns in 2011.

Two number one draft picks dominated the news for the Hagerstown Suns in 2011. Bryce Harper, the overall first pick in the 2010 Major League Baseball draft, started the season with the Suns. Before he moved to the Double-A Harrisburg Senators in mid-season, he played well enough to be selected for the SAL All-Star Game. Later in the season, the 2009 Major League Baseball draft overall first pick, Stephen Strasburg, pitched at Hagerstown on a rehabilitation assignment.

The 2012 season had a tragic beginning when Mitchell Akers, an 18-year-old high school senior who was working with the team, died on April 11. Sources within the league said he fell off the back of a John Deere Gator at Municipal Stadium and later died from his injuries. On the field, 2012 proved to be a banner year for Suns third baseman Matt Skole. He led the SAL in home runs (27), bases on balls (94), on base percentage (.438), and slugging percentage (.574). In addition, Skole was also elected as the Nationals' Minor League Player of the Year and the SAL Player of the Year. The Suns made the divisional playoffs; however, they were swept by the defending SAL champion Greensboro Grasshoppers, two games to none. Discussions concerning the relocation of the Hagerstown Suns to Virginia began circulating. A letter from the Washington Nationals was sent to Suns majority owner Bruce Quinn stating that Hagerstown's 80-year-old Municipal Stadium was no longer up to Major League Baseball standards. Initially, Quinn began discussions with the Winchester Economic Development Authority to relocate the team to Winchester, Virginia, to begin play in 2014. The negotiations failed in part because of the refusal of the Winchester community to provide public funding for a new stadium

In 2013, Hagerstown led the SAL in the offensive categories of runs scored (692), runs batted in (608), and on base percentage (.341). Improving over 2012, the Suns won the SAL Northern Division, but fell to the Savannah Sand Gnats, three games to one in the league championship. Tony Renda was selected as the initial recipient of the Bob Boone Award, granted to the Washington Nationals' minor league player "who best demonstrates the professionalism, leadership, loyalty, passion, selflessness, durability, determination, and work ethic required to play the game the Washington Nationals way." In October 2013, the Suns formally applied to Minor League Baseball to relocate to Fredericksburg, Virginia, for the 2015 season. The Suns and their partners, New Jersey-based Diamond Nation and a Fredericksburg-area automotive company, agreed to purchase a 38-acre stadium site inside the Fredericksburg city limits. The facility was initially planned to be ready for the start of the 2015 season at a cost of $29 million. However, in November 2014 Diamond Nation announced that it was terminating its option to purchase the Suns. A contributing factor in this decision was the increase in estimated cost to build the facility to $53 million.

Hagerstown began the 2014 season with a record of 31 wins and 8 losses, which was the highest winning percentage in the minor leagues. However, the team then went 13–18, finishing with a first-half season record of 44–26. The Greensboro Grasshoppers shared the 44–26 record. However, because Greensboro defeated Hagerstown in three out of four games during the first-half season, Greensboro was awarded the SAL Northern Division first half title. The second-half season proved to be a repeat of the first. Once again, Greensboro and Hagerstown finished in a tie for first, this time with identical 43–27 records. The tie breaker system worked in the Suns' favor this time, because Hagerstown won five of seven games against Greensboro in the second half. Shining brightest among the Suns' everyday players in 2014 was SAL Most Valuable Player Wilmer Difo. The middle infielder led the SAL with 176 hits, placed second with 49 stolen bases, and fourth with 90 runs batted in. Additionally, Difo was the recipient of the 2014 Bob Boone Award. Fellow SAL End-of-Season All-Star Rafael Bautista led the league with 69 steals. The pitching was also a team strength, led by Lucas Giolito who was honored as the league's top pitcher and top major league prospect. The Suns improved their playoff performance over 2013, but it was still not enough to claim the John Henry Moss Cup, symbolic of the SAL championship. The Suns lost the SAL championship series, three games to two, to the Asheville Tourists.

The most unusual game of 2015 occurred on April 15 when the Suns won a 1–0 game against the West Virginia Power despite having no hits. The lone run in the game crossed the plate in the top of the first inning. The Suns loaded the bases after being issued two walks and one batter getting hit. With two outs, left fielder Jeff Gardner drew a walk to force home right fielder Narciso Mesa from third to score the only run of the game. This was the first minor league no-hitter resulting in defeat in a full-season league since 2008. During the year Suns majority owner Bruce Quinn entered into negotiations with Spotsylvania County, Virginia officials to move the Suns. Quinn proposed a 5,000-seat, $30 million stadium, with $28 million borrowed by the county and $2 million paid by the Suns, who would pay a rent of $175,000 annually. Minor League Baseball gave Quinn until July 31 to complete the deal. The deadline passed with no further action.

The 2016 campaign saw a return to postseason play for Hagerstown as the Suns won the first-half Northern Division title by one-half game over the Delmarva Shorebirds. In the Northern Division championship the Suns were swept 2–0 by the Lakewood BlueClaws. The Suns SAL End-of-Season All-Stars were Kevin Gutierrez (third base), Ian Sagdall (utility infielder), and Patrick Anderson (manager).

There were several noteworthy games during the 2017 season. On April 30, the Suns set a single-game record SAL record with 30 hits in a 22 to 4 victory over the Lexington Legends. Hagerstown and Lexington also tied the SAL record of 42 combined hits during the game. Games from June 1 to June 4 set a four-game series attendance record (22,578) at Municipal Stadium as Tim Tebow visited Hagerstown with the Columbia Fireflies. On June 7, Hagerstown and the Greensboro Grasshoppers played a game at Burlington, North Carolina's Burlington Athletic Stadium, home of the short-season rookie Appalachian League Burlington Royals. This was the first full-season Class A game in Burlington since 1964. On Father's Day (June 18) in Lexington, inclement weather caused the Suns and Legends to end their game in an unusual 5 to 5 tie. Ross Combs was recognized as the SAL Sales Executive of the Year.

In 2018, Brandon Groomes was recognized as the SAL Batperson of the Year for the fourth year in a row.

2019 was noteworthy in three respects. It was the last year the Suns fielded a team. Patrick Anderson had a record-breaking sixth year managing the team. Finally, the Suns had a record low attendance of 59,686 fans during the season.

=== Team folds ===
Following the cancelled 2020 season, the team announced in an email to season ticket holders on November 21, 2020, that the Washington Nationals were not renewing their affiliation with the Suns. Team General Manager Travis Painter noted, "It is with a heavy heart that I’m writing to let you know that the Washington Nationals have decided not to renew their affiliation with the Hagerstown Suns. This brings 40 years of Hagerstown Suns baseball to a close." On December 9, 2020, the Nationals announced that the Fredericksburg Nationals, formerly the Potomac Nationals of Woodbridge, Virginia, would take over as the club's Low-A affiliate. As part of the minor league restructuring process, Major League Baseball did not invite the Suns to affiliate at any level or with any team, formally ending affiliated minor league baseball in Hagerstown.

== South Atlantic League All-Stars and season leaders ==
Suns South Atlantic League End of Season All-Stars
Position	Name	Year	Notes
Pitcher	Sneed, John	1998	
Pitcher	Andrews, Clayton	1998	South Atlantic League Pitcher of the Year
Pitcher	Bonser, Boof	2001	South Atlantic League Pitcher of the Year
Pitcher	Habel, Josh	2003	
Pitcher	Giolito, Lucas	2014	South Atlantic League Pitcher of the Year
Catcher	Mosquera, Julio	1995	
First baseman	Boston, D.J.	1993	South Atlantic League Most Valuable Player
First baseman	Lopez, Luis	1997	South Atlantic League Most Valuable Player
First Baseman	Marmolejos, Jose	2015	
Second baseman	Abernathy, Brent	1997	
Second baseman	Lombardozzi, Steve	2009	
Second baseman	Difo, Wilmer	2014	South Atlantic League Most Valuable Player
Second baseman	Nole, Jake	2017	
Third baseman	Skole, Matthew	2012	South Atlantic League Most Valuable Player
Third baseman	Gutierrez, Kelvin	2016	
Shortstop	Jackson, Brandon	2000	
Outfielder	Herrera, Jose	1993	
Outfielder	Bautista, Rafael	2014	
Outfielder	Johnson, Daniel	2017	
Utility infielder	Renda, Tony	2013	
Utility infielder	Sagdal, Ian	2016	
Utility outfielder	Wells, Vernon	1998	
Utility outfielder	Hood, Destin	2010	
Designated hitter	Durso, Joe	1994	
Designated hitter	Ladd, Jeff	1995	
Designated hitter	Whitlock, Mike	1996	
Designated hitter	Cripps, Bobby	1998	
Designated hitter	Gibbons, Jay	1999	
Designated hitter	Norris, Derek	2009	
Designated hitter	Bloxom, Justin	2010	
Manager	Keister, Tripp	2013	
Manager	Anderson, Patrick	2016	

Suns South Atlantic League Season Leaders (Batting)
Year	Name	Category	Number
1994	Ramirez, Angel	Triples	14
1995	Ladd, Jeff	On base percentage (min 2.7 PA per team game)	.454
1995	Ladd, Jeff	Slugging percentage (min 2.7 PA per team game)	.563
1995	Ladd, Jeff	On base plus slugging percentage (min 2.7 PA per team game)	1.017
1996	Solano, Fausto	Plate appearances	617
1996	Solano, Fausto	Caught stealing	25
1996	Whitlock, Mike	Intentional bases on balls	9
1997	Lopez, Luis	Batting average (min 2.7 PA per team game)	.358
1997	Lopez, Luis	Hits	180
1997	Lopez, Luis	On base percentage (min 2.7 PA per team game)	.430
1998	Young, Michael	Games played	140
1999	Nunez, Jorge	Runs scored	116
1999	Nunez, Jorge	Triples	11
1999	Lopez, Felipe	Struck out	157
2002	Benavidez, Julian	Struck out	148
2005	Gomez, Carlos	Stolen bases	64
2005	Gomez, Carlos	Caught stealing	24
2006	Evans, Nick	Games played	137
2009	Norris, Derek	Walks	90
2009	Norris, Derek	On base percentage (min 2.7 PA per team game)	.413
2010	Perez, Eury	Stolen bases	64
2011	Sanchez, Adrian	At bats	538
2011	Kelso, Blake	Hits	150
2012	Skole, Matt	Home runs	27
2012	Skole, Matt	Walks	94
2012	Skole, Matt	On base percentage (min 2.7 PA per team game)	.438
2012	Skole, Matt	Slugging percentage (min 2.7 PA per team game)	.574
2012	Skole, Matt	On base plus slugging percentage (min 2.7 PA per team game)	1.013
2013	Renda, Tony	Games played	135
2013	Renda, Tony	At bats	521
2013	Renda, Tony	Runs scored	99
2013	Renda, Tony	Doubles	43
2014	Difo, Wilmer	Games played	136
2014	Difo, Wilmer	At bats	559
2014	Bautista, Rafael	Runs scored	97
2014	Difo, Wilmer	Hits	176
2014	Bautista, Rafael	Stolen bases	69
1993	Santiago, Henry	Triples	12
1993	Herrera, Jose	Caught stealing	20
2015	Marmolejos, Jose	Hits	145
2015	Marmolejos, Jose	Doubles	39
2015	Marmalejos, Jose	Runs batted in	87
2015	Marmalejos, Jose	Total bases	227
2017	Perkins, Blake	Runs Scored	105
2017	Perkins, Blake	Walks	72

Suns South Atlantic League Season Leaders (Pitching)
Year	Name	Category	Number
1997	Glover, Gary	Losses	17
1997	LaChappelle, Yan	Fewest hits per 9 innings (min 0.8 IP per team game)	5.5
1998	Sneed, John	Wins	16
1998	Sneed, John	Winning percentage (min 1 decision per 10 team games)	.889 (16–2)
1999	Casey, Joe	Losses	14 (Tied with one other)
1999	Smith, Taylor	Games started	28
1999	Casey, Joe	Games started	28
1999	Smith, Taylor	Innings pitched	171.1
1999	Casey, Joe	Hit batsmen	21
1999	Casey, Joe	Wild pitches	25
1999	Smith, Taylor	Batters faced	724
2000	Sandoval, Marcos	Home runs allowed	20
2001	Bonser, Boof	Wins	16
2001	Bonser, Boof	Fewest hits per 9 innings (min 0.8 IP per team game)	6.1
2001	Bonser, Boof	Strikeouts per 9 innings (min 0.8 IP per team game)	12.0
2003	Palmer, Matt	Saves	25
2003	Valdez, Merken	Strikeouts	166
2003	Valdez, Merken	Strikeouts per 9 innings (min 0.8 IP per team game)	9.6
2004	Alvarez, Timothy	Saves	22 (Tied with 1 other)
1994	Sinnes, David	Saves	37 (tied with 1 other)
1998	Andrews, Clayton	Earned run average (ERA) (min 0.8 IP per team game)	2.28
2005	Miramontes, Matthew	Hit batsmen	19
2008	Kimball, Cole	Hit batsmen	17
2011	Grace, Matt	Wins	12
2017	Mills, McKenzie	Wins	12

== Major League Baseball (MLB) players who played for the South Atlantic League (SAL) Suns ==
Note: MLB players with Carolina League or Eastern League Suns experience can be found at History of the Hagerstown Suns

List of MLB Players with SAL Suns Experience
1993–2019 (Current as of October 16, 2021)
**Bold**	MLB All-Star		†	Rehab Assignment			
Player name	Year(s) with Suns	Player name	Year(s) with Suns	Player name	Year(s) with Suns	Player name	Year(s) with Suns
Brent Abernathy	1997	Joan Adon	2019	Clayton Andrews	1997, 1998	Rick Ankiel	2012†
Luis Atilano	2008	Pedro Ávila	2016	Dakota Bacus	2013	John Bale	1997
Tres Barrera	2017	Aaron Barrett	2012	Rafael Bautista	2014, 2019†	Casey Blake	1996
Tony Blanco	2007†	Boof Bonser	2001	James Bourque	2016, 2017	Brian Bowles	1997, 1998
Ben Braymer	2017, 2018	Ryan Buchter	2008	Billy Burns	2012	Brian Burres	2002
Brian Buscher	2003	Drew Butera	2006	**Matt Cain**	2003	Mike Carp	2005
Kevin Cash	2000	Scott Cassidy	1999	Angel Chavez	2001	Matt Chico	2009†
Pasqual Coco	1999	A. J. Cole	2011	Mike Coolbaugh	1993	Brad Cornett	1993
Jon Coutlangus	2004	Rickey Cradle	1993	Joe Davenport	1995, 1996, 1997	Tom Davey	1995, 1996
Felix Diaz	2001	Wilmer Difo	2013, 2014	Jason Ellison	2001	Jesse English	2004
Marco Estrada	2007	Leo Estrella	1998	Nick Evans	2006	Tom Evans	1993, 1994
Bryan Eversgerd	1997	Erick Fedde	2015	Aaron Fletcher	2019	Jesus Flores	2005
Matt Ford	2000	David Freitas	2011	Luis García (pitcher)	2010	Luis García Jr.	2018
Chad Gaudin	2011†	Jay Gibbons	1999	**Lucas Giolito**	2014, 2016	Gary Glover	1997
Koda Glover	2015	Carlos Gómez	2005	Brian Goodwin	2012	Matt Grace	2011
Franklyn Gracesqui	2000	Beiker Graterol	1997	Taylor Guilbeau	2016	Kelvin Gutierrez	2016
**Bryce Harper**	2011	Taylor Hearn	2016	Brad Hennessey	2003	Clay Hensley	2003
Jose Herrera	1993	Taylor Hill	2012	Steve Holm	2003	Destin Hood	2010
**Orlando Hudson**	1999	Edwin Hurtado	1994	Travis Ishikawa	2004	**César Izturis**	1998
Juan Jaime	2009	Daniel Johnson	2017	Mike Johnson	1996	Reed Johnson	2000
Taylor Jordan	2010, 2011, 2012	Nate Karns	2012	Austin Kearns	2008†	Carter Kieboom	2017
Spencer Kieboom	2014	Cole Kimball	2008, 2012†	Gabe Klobosits	2017, 2019	Justin Knoedler	2002
Jeff Kobernus	2010, 2014†	Joe Lawrence	1997	Sandy León	2009, 2010	Fred Lewis	2003
**Francisco Liriano**	2002	Steve Lombardozzi Jr.	2009	**Felipe López**	1999	Luis Lopez	1997
Reynaldo López	2013, 2014	Mark Lukasiewicz	1996	Trey Lunsford	2001	Jim Mann	1997
Jose Marmolejos	2015	Chris Marrero	2007, 2012†	J.D. Martin	2016†	Fernando Martinez	2006
Michael Martínez	2007	Sandy Martínez	1993	Ryan Mattheus	2013†	Justin Maxwell	2007
Pat McCoy	2009	Adam Melhuse	1994	Alex Meyer	2012	Justin Miller	2019
Tommy Milone	2008	Garrett Mock	2010†	Tyler Moore	2009	Nyjer Morgan	2010†
A. J. Morris	2009	Michael Morse	2012†	Julio Mosquera	1995	Carlos Muñiz	2005
Scott Munter	2003	Sheldon Neuse	2017	Adrian Nieto	2010, 2011, 2012	Jonathon Niese	2006
Jake Noll	2016, 2017	Derek Norris	2009	Jhonny Núñez	2007	Scott Olsen	2010†
Matt Palmer	2003	Bobby Parnell	2006	Brad Peacock	2008, 2009	Eury Perez	2010
Josh Phelps	1998	Nick Pivetta	2014	Matt Purke	2012, 2013, 2015	Guillermo Quiróz	2000
**Wilson Ramos**	2014†	Robbie Ray	2011	Raudy Read	2015	Pokey Reese	2008†
Jakson Reetz	2016	Tony Renda	2013	**Alex Ríos**	2000	Felipe Rivero	2014
Ken Robinson	1993, 1994	Víctor Robles	2016	**Francisco Rodriguez**	2017	Jefry Rodriguez	2014, 2015, 2016
Mike Romano	1994	Seth Romero	2018	Joe Ross	2016†	Billy Sadler	2003
Ryan Sadowski	2004	Adrián Sánchez	2010, 2011	Anthony Sanders	1995	Francisco Santos	2001
Nate Schierholtz	2004	Max Schrock	2016	Zack Segovia	2008†	Atahualpa Severino	2008
Pedro Severino	2013	Adam Shabala	2001	Sterling Sharp	2017	José Silva	1993
Steve Sinclair	1994	Matt Skole	2012	Doug Slaten	2011†	Brian Smith	1995
Josh Smoker	2008, 2010, 2012†	Jake Smolinski	2008	Jhonatan Solano	2007, 2008	Sammy Solis	2010, 2011, 2014†, 2016†
Steven Souza	2008, 2009, 2010, 2012, 2014†	**Juan Soto**	2017, 2018	Denard Span	2014†, 2015†	Andrew Stevenson	2015
Shannon Stewart	1993	Josh Stinson	2006	Drew Storen	2009	**Stephen Strasburg**	2011†
Wander Suero	2014	Michael Taylor	2010, 2011	Andy Thompson	1994	Erick Threets	2001, 2002, 2003
**Dan Uggla**	2015†	Merkin Valdez	2003	Phillips Valdez	2014, 2015	**Felipe Vazquez**	2014
Austin Voth	2013	Jason Waddell	2002, 2003	Chien-Ming Wang	2011†, 2012†	**Vernon Wells**	1998
Austen Williams	2015	**Brian Wilson**	2004	Cody Wilson	2019	Craig A. Wilson	1996
Kevin Witt	1995	Chris Woodward	1996	**Michael Young**	1998	**Ryan Zimmerman**	2011†
**Jordan Zimmermann**	2010†	Eddie Zosky	1993†				

== List of Hagerstown Suns individual records ==
Note: These records also include Suns players from the Carolina League era (1981–1988). Suns Double-A records are at History of the Hagerstown Suns.

Single-A Individual Single Season Batting Records
Record	Name	Year	Number
Batting average (2.7 PA/league game)	Luis Lopez	1997	.358
On-base percentage (2.7 PA/league game)	Jeff Ladd	1995	.454
Slugging percentage (2.7 PA/league game)	Matthew Tyner	1981	.598
On-base plus slugging percentage (OPS) (2.7 PA/league game)	Jeff Ladd	1995	1.017
At bats	Jorge Nunez	1999	564
Runs	Ken Gerhart	1983	131
Hits	Luis Lopez	1997	180
Total bases	Ken Gerhart	1983	275
Doubles	Luis Lopez	1997	47
Home runs	Ken Gerhart; Matthew Tyner	1983; 1981	31
Triples	Angel Ramirez	1994	14
RBI	Leo Gómez	1987	110
Walks	Mike Whitlock	1996	108
Strikeouts	Felipe Gomez	1999	157
Stolen bases	Don Buford; Pete Stanicek	1988; 1986	77
Hit by pitch	Reed Johnson; Rob Mummau	2000; 1995	14
Sacrifice hits	Eury Perez	2010	21
Sacrifice flies	Michael Eberle	1988	11
Intentional walks	Derek Norms; John Stefero	2009; 1981	9
Grounded into double plays	David Freitas	2011	17
Most games	Michael Young	1998	140

Single-A Individual Single Season Pitching Records
Record	Name	Year	Number
Earned run average (ERA) (0.8 IP per league game)	Jeff Ballard	1986	1.85
Wins	Boof Bonser; John Sneed	2001; 1998	16
Walks and hits per inning pitched (WHIP) (0.8 IP per league game)	Clayton Andrews	1998	.975
Hits allowed/9IP (0.8 IP per league game)	Yan LaChapelle	1997	5.5
Walks/9IP (0.8 IP per league game)	Jeff Clark	2001	0.9
Strikeouts/9IP (0.8 IP per league game)	Boof Bonser	2001	12.0
Saves	Jackson Markert	2001	39
Innings	Gary Glover	1997	173
Strikeouts	John Sneed	1998	210
Complete games	Robert Konopa	1983	10
Shutouts	Robert Konopa; Richard Cratch; Mike Johnson; Isabel Giron	1983; 1983; 1996; 1998	3
Walks allowed	Mark Leiter	1984	108
Hits allowed	Marcus Sandoval	2000	188
Strikeout to walk (0.8 IP per league game)	Jeff Clark	2001	8.73
Losses	Gary Glover	1997	17
Earned runs allowed	Mark Leiter	1984	87
Wild pitches	Joe Casey	1999	25
Hit batsmen	Cameron Reiters	2000	21
Batters faced	Gary Glover	1997	751
Games finished	Carlos Concepción	1983	50

== Rivals ==
The Suns had an in-state rivalry with the Delmarva Shorebirds, an affiliate of the Baltimore Orioles. This particular rivalry was also fueled by the regional rivalry between the two parent clubs.

== Hagerstown Suns South Atlantic League (SAL) team season-by-season record ==
Suns SAL Season-by-Season Record
Season	Affiliation	Manager	Record	Finish	Postseason	Attendance
1993	Toronto	Jim Nettles	74–68	4th	—	95,702
1994	Toronto	Omar Malave	80–56	2nd	Defeated Hickory in first round, 2–0; Lost to Savannah in league championship, 3–0	111,660
1995	Toronto	Omar Molave	73–68	5th	—	113,438
1996	Toronto	Joe Cannon	70–71	3rd	—	102,765
1997	Toronto	Joe Cannon	65–73	4th	—	115,011
1998	Toronto	Marty Pevy	81–60	1st Half: 1st (44–26); 2nd Half: 3rd (37–34)	Defeated Delmarva in first round, 2–0; Lost in semifinals to Capital City, 2–1	109,932
1999	Toronto	Rolando Pino	84–56	1st Half: 1st (48–23); 2nd Half: 2nd (36–33)	Lost to Cape Fear in quarterfinals, 2–0	105,380
2000	Toronto	Rolando Pino	63–74	11th	—	102,443
2001	San Francisco	Bill Hayes	83–57	1st Half: 3rd (38–32); 2nd Half: 1st (45–25)	Lost to Lexington, 2–0, in Northern Division championship	100,690
2002	San Francisco	Mike Ramsey	63–77	7th	—	103,188
2003	San Francisco	Mike Ramsey	68–67	3rd	—	100,865
2004	San Francisco	Mike Ramsey	40–88	8th	—	128,508
2005	New York Mets	Gene Richards	71–66	1st Half: 1st (tie) (42–28); 2nd Half: 8th (29–38)	Defeated Lexington, 1–0, in Northern Division 1st half playoff Defeated Delmarva, 2–1, in Northern Division championship Lost to Kannapolis, 3–1, in league championship	153,675
2006	New York Mets	Frank Cacciatore	58–82	8th	—	149,188
2007	Washington	Tom Herr	55–81	1st Half: 7th (29–38); 2nd Half: 8th (26–43)	—	146,763
2008	Washington	Darnell Coles	61–78	1st Half: 5th (34–35); 2nd Half: 6th (27–43)	—	137,283
2009	Washington	Matt LeCroy	56–78	1st Half: 6th (31–36); 2nd Half: 8th (25–42)	—	137,283
2010	Washington	Matt LeCroy	65–75	1st Half: 3rd (36–34); 2nd Half: 6th (29–41)	—	135,799
2011	Washington	Brian Daubach	56–78	1st Half: 3rd (40–30); 2nd Half: 4th (35–34)	—	123,593
2012	Washington	Brian Daubach	82–58	1st Half: 2nd (42–37); 2nd Half: 1st (40–28)	Lost to Greensboro, 2–0, in Northern Division championship	87,429
2013	Washington	Tripp Keister	80–57	1st Half: 1st (38–29); 2nd Half: 2nd (42–28)	Defeated West Virginia, 2–1, in Northern Division championship Lost to Savannah, 3–1, in league championship	65,606
2014	Washington	Patrick Anderson	87–53	1st Half: 2nd (44–26); 2nd Half: 1st (43–27)	Defeated Greensboro, 2–0, in Northern Division Championship; Lost to Asheville, 3–2 in league championship	61,683
2015	Washington	Patrick Anderson	68–70	1st Half: 3rd (35–33); 2nd Half 5th (33–37)	–	68,688
2016	Washington	Patrick Anderson	83–57	1st Half: 1st (43–27); 2nd Half: 2nd (40–30)	Lost to Lakewood, 2–0, in Northern Division championship	82,526
2017	Washington	Patrick Anderson	73–63	1st Half: 3rd (38–31); 2nd Half: 4th (35–32)	–	84,181
2018	Washington	Patrick Anderson	52–81	1st Half: 7th (27–41); 2nd Half: 7th (25–40)	–	64,957
2019	Washington	Patrick Anderson	65–75	1st Half: 5th (30–40); 2nd Half: 5th (35–35)	–	59,686
